= PixARK =

2019 video game

- Developer: Snail Games
- Publisher: Snail Games
- Engine: Unreal Engine 4
- Platforms: Microsoft Windows, Xbox One, PlayStation 4, Nintendo Switch
- Release: May 31, 2019
- Genre: Survival

PixARK is a survival video game that was released on March 27, 2018 in early access for Microsoft Windows. A spin-off of Ark: Survival Evolved, the game can be played in both single-player and multiplayer modes.

== Gameplay ==
The player is on an island populated by over 100 different dinosaur species. These can be killed or tamed and ridden. In addition, the player must ensure their survival by mining resources, making objects, building structures and defending themselves against enemy animals and other players. The world is made up of individual voxels, so the player can manipulate and adapt the world by removing or adding blocks. The world has several areas such as jungle, desert and caves and is generated procedurally, so it is not prefabricated. Likewise, the quest system is procedural and always creates new challenges. In addition to the survival mode, the player can also focus on building in creative mode without being attacked and collecting resources.

== Development and release ==
Snail Games announced a cooperation with Ark: Survival Evolved developer Studio Wildcard. The game was announced on January 25, 2018 with a trailer.

PixARK was released in March 2018 in an early-access version for Microsoft Windows and Xbox One. The full launch version was released on May 31, 2019 for Microsoft Windows and Xbox One along with versions for PlayStation 4 and Nintendo Switch.
