= Eefje =

Eefje is a feminine Dutch given name. Notable people with the name include:

- Eefje Boons (born 1994), Dutch hurdler
- Eefje Depoortere (born 1987), also known as Sjokz, Belgian television presenter, reporter, and esports player
- Eefje Lambrecks, a victim of Marc Dutroux
- Eefje Muskens (born 1989), Dutch badminton player
- Eefje de Visser (born 1986), Dutch singer-songwriter

== See also ==
- 8289 An-Eefje, a minor planet
