= Atlas (video game) =

2018 early access video game by Instinct Games

- Developer: Grapeshot Games Additional work by: Instinct Games
- Publisher: Snail Games USA
- Platforms: Windows; Xbox One
- Release: December 13, 2018 (early access)
- Genre: MMO
- Mode: Multiplayer

Atlas is a survival MMO video game developed by Grapeshot Games and published by Snail Games USA for Microsoft Windows and Xbox One, available in early access. Set in a pirate world, the players need to satisfy needs and fight against enemies while hunting for treasures and exploring.

== Gameplay ==
In Atlas, people can create their own pirates, with adjustable settings such as skin color. Before entering, the game gives a choice between a PvE or PvP server, whereas PvP allows the other players to attack at any time. Similar to Ark: Survival Evolved, it is a survival game where the goal is to live as long as possible. The survival gameplay, in part, requires the player to manage four "vitamin" levels. Vitamin levels decrease over time. Levels increase when the character eats foods with various nutritional contents: meat, vegetables, fruit and fish. Vitamin levels have minimum and maximum limits; levels outside of limits apply status effects like blurry screen or decreasing health bar to the player. Other character states have to be managed, like hydration/water needs; neglect of which may result in dehydration. In order to build something, enough resources must be gathered by cutting trees and smashing rocks, which uses up some health. Building a ship is possible by constructing its parts, and filling its reserves with food and weapons. They can be navigated while travelling between the lands.

The islands contain a world full of creatures, some being predators (bear, lion, tiger), giving the resources after the defeat. However, everyone has an ability to tame some animals, which involves trapping them and feeding to win their trust.

Atlas encourages the players to connect in groups named companies. In any server, a land has to be claimed in order to use it as a base, either as a battle challenge or stolen from an offline user. Designed to be around 1,200 times larger than in Ark, the game world is able to handle 40,000 players at once. The map is separated into a grid, where each segment can contain either land or ocean, and hold only a fixed amount of pirates.

== Development ==
The game was initially announced at The Game Awards 2018. The surprise reveal was done to give the players a complete attention to Atlas, rather than spreading it throughout the year. That also forced the launch to happen without running an actual open beta test. The game is developed by Grapeshot Games, a spin-off team of Studio Wildcard, led by Jeremy Stieglitz and Jesse Rapczak.

At the end of January 2019, Atlas's servers went offline with a rollback, in order to investigate the issue of a certain number of cheaters using forbidden creations and exploits. In a statement, Grapeshot Games revealed that the spawns were made possible, because of a compromised Steam account belonging to one of the game's administrators. The hacker used that to log into the server and change the settings. Three days later, several players misused a technical fault and kept adding animals with a repeatable message that said "Subscribe to PewDiePie", forcing the developers to undo the errors and ban multiple accounts.

In April 2019, a 1.5 update was launched. It brought stability server improvements, and added new content, such as new quests, and a Colonies mode. Colonies was invented to solve the issue of Atlas being unapproachable to casual players participating in smaller groups.
