= Ark Park =

2018 video game

- Developers: Snail Games, Studio Wildcard
- Publisher: Snail
- Engine: Unreal Engine 4
- Platforms: PlayStation VR, Oculus Rift S, HTC Vive, Valve Index, Windows Mixed Reality
- Release: March 22, 2018
- Genre: Virtual reality
- Mode: Co-op mode; multiplayer; single-player

Ark Park is a virtual reality spin-off game of Ark: Survival Evolved.

== Gameplay ==
Ark Park features over a hundred species of dinosaurs. The game features different areas with unique scenery to explore. The player can gather and craft things. Eggs can be found in the park which players can use to raise their own dinosaurs. The game also features a story mode where the player must defend a base against dinosaurs using a variety of weapons.

== Reception ==
The PlayStation 4 version of Ark Park received "generally unfavorable" reviews from critics, according to the review aggregation website Metacritic. Shacknews compared Ark Park to the Jurassic Park franchise.
