= Monster Hunter: World =

2018 video game

- Cover art, featuring a Rathalos
- Developer: Capcom
- Publisher: Capcom
- Director: Yuya Tokuda
- Producers: Hironobu Takeshita; Shingo Izumi; Kazunori Inoue; Ryozo Tsujimoto
- Designers: Teruki Endo; Yugo Togawa
- Programmers: Yuuki Ooi; Kota Fukasawa
- Artist: Kaname Fujioka
- Composers: Akihiko Narita; Zhenlan Kang
- Series: Monster Hunter
- Engine: MT Framework
- Platforms: PlayStation 4; Xbox One; Windows
- Release: PlayStation 4, Xbox One; January 26, 2018; Windows; August 9, 2018
- Genre: Action role-playing
- Modes: Single-player, multiplayer

Monster Hunter: World (Note: Monsutā Hantā: Wārudo (Japanese: モンスターハンター：ワールド)) is a 2018 action role-playing game developed and published by Capcom. The fifth mainline installment in the Monster Hunter series, it was released worldwide for PlayStation 4 and Xbox One in January 2018, with a Windows version following in August 2018. In the game, the player takes the role of a Hunter, tasked to hunt down and either kill or trap monsters that roam in one of several environmental spaces. If successful, the player is rewarded through loot consisting of parts from the monster and other elements that are used to craft weapons and armor, amongst other equipment. The game's core loop has the player crafting appropriate gear to be able to hunt down more difficult monsters, which in turn provide parts that lead to more powerful gear. Players may hunt alone or in a group of up to four players via the game's online multiplayer.

Announced at E3 2017, Monster Hunter: World adopts the series' standard formulas from its older home console roots and recent handheld games to take advantage of the higher processing power provided by modern consoles and computers. Changes made in Monster Hunter: World include creating environmental spaces that are fully connected and removing the "zones" that were necessary for the PlayStation 2 and handheld games, more advanced monster artificial intelligence and physics, a more persistent cooperative multiplayer experience, and a refinement of the game's tutorials and user interface to help with bringing new players into the series. These changes led Capcom to plan for the game's simultaneous release worldwide, since Monster Hunter as a series has generally languished outside of Japan partially due to disparate release schedules. Capcom also opted to support online play between these different geographic regions for similar reasons. The delay for the Windows release was attributed to Capcom seeking to make sure its first entry into the Windows market was optimized for players on computers. By April 2020, updates to the game were synchronized among all platforms.

Monster Hunter: World received critical acclaim upon release. Critics praised how Capcom was able to make the game more accessible to new players and to Western markets, without detracting from the series' core gameplay elements and enjoyable difficulty, and fully taking advantage of the computational capacity of modern consoles to create living ecosystems. Monster Hunter: World is the single highest-selling game in Capcom's history, with over 30.83 million copies shipped by October 2026. A DLC expansion pack, subtitled Iceborne, was released for home consoles in September 2019 and for Windows in January 2020, and reached 10 million sales by December 2022. The next installment, Monster Hunter Rise, was co-developed alongside World and announced for a worldwide release on Nintendo Switch in March 2021, with a Windows version released in January 2022.

== Gameplay ==
Monster Hunter: World is an action role-playing game played from a third-person perspective. The player takes the role of a player-created character who travels to the "New World", an unpopulated landmass filled with monsters, to join the Research Commission that studies the land from their central command base of Astera. The Research Commission assigns the Hunter to track down and either kill or capture large monsters that roam outside Astera, both to protect the Commission and to study the monsters themselves. The player's character does not have any intrinsic attributes, instead these are determined by equipment. This includes a weapon, selected from the series' fourteen archetypes (such as the long sword, bow, or hammer), which defines the combat moves and abilities the player can use; and pieces of armor, which can lead to beneficial or detrimental combat skills if matched properly. The majority of equipment is created from loot obtained by hunting monsters, rewards from completing quests, or items gathered in the field. This creates a core loop of gameplay in which players defeat monsters they are currently capable of handling to collect materials needed to craft better weapons and armor—to in turn challenge stronger monsters and earn access to even more powerful equipment.

Astera serves as a central hub where the player can buy and sell goods, manage their inventory, craft new equipment, and obtain new quests. A core facet of Monster Hunter games is the construction and upgrading of armor and weapons at a forge using monster parts and resources obtained through combat and exploration. As the player defeats tougher monsters, they can craft armor with higher defensive values or specific elemental resistances, or upgrade weapons to be more powerful and deal elemental or debuffing damage. Weapons and armor also carry various skills that grant a range of effects to the player; World introduces a new streamlined skill system compared to previous games, where each weapon or armor piece has one or more ranks in at least one skill, and the total effect of that skill is determined by adding up all ranks across the player's equipped items. Additional services in Astera include a farm to grow quantities of flora while the player is out on quests, training areas to practice weapons, a gathering hub to take on special Arena challenges against one or more monsters, and a canteen where the player can order meals made from specific ingredients to provide buffs and special effects while out on the field.

=== Quests and combat ===
After taking a quest in Astera, or after choosing to simply go on an open-ended expedition, the player is taken to a base camp in one of six large regions that make up the New World. Each region is made up of numbered zones, but unlike previous Monster Hunter games, these zones are seamlessly connected, and there are no loading screens when moving between them. The player must traverse zone to zone, though they can quick-travel to any of the base camps in that particular region when outside of combat. From camp, the player can acquire limited provisions, rest to restore their health, and new to World, have a meal at a canteen functionally identical to the one at Astera. The player sets out to track down monsters, which in World is aided with the use of Scoutflies, which hover near tracks and other signs of large monsters, or highlight resources that the player can collect such as flora, ores, bones, and insects. Investigating the traces of the monster leads to improving the Scoutflies' abilities for the quest, eventually enabling them to lead the player via their glowing flight path towards the monster they seek. Furthermore, investigating these will increase the research level towards the monster, granting insight on its strengths, weaknesses, and behavior.

In this gameplay screenshot, the hunter is combating the 'Great Jagras' monster.

Once a monster is located, the player can take several approaches to either slay or capture it using traps once sufficiently weakened, using a combination of their weapons and items they are carrying. As a monster is weakened, its tactics will often change, frequently becoming more aggressive, or fleeing to a lair to rest or find food to recover. The player has additional tools within World for combat. Each player has a Slinger, a tool that can be used to fire small projectiles such as rocks at the monster to damage it or cause other debuffs, or can be used as a grappling hook to reach higher elevations. Environmental hazards such as boulders can be shot or grappled down with the Slinger to damage the monster. A new type of tool called a Mantle can be used for a limited amount of time; these cloak-like objects provide a buff to the player, such as negating a fixed amount of damage taken or reducing the chances of monsters detecting the player. Furthermore, the player has opportunities to use the environment strategically against the monster, such as bursting a natural dam to flood out a monster, or leading a monster into another monster's den to cause them to fight each other. The game includes a dynamic weather system and day-night cycle, which can affect the behavior of some monsters mid-quest.

In combat, the player must watch their health—if it falls to zero, they faint and are taken back to camp. They can set out again at a reduced reward, but fainting more than usually three times will fail the quest. Additionally, the player must manage their stamina, which is consumed from dodging and certain other attacks and actions; stamina will recover quickly while the player is not taking intensive actions, which can be difficult during battle. The player can carry various restorative items for health and stamina; unlike previous games where the player was forced to stand still to consume them, World allows the player to do so while walking, though the player must not be interrupted for a few moments to gain the items' full effects. With an aim to reach a wider audience than past games, Monster Hunter: World also provides more information to players, such as a companion that will warn the player when they are running low on health, and more details on the advantages and disadvantages of weapons and armors against specific monsters. The player must also be aware of various debuffs that monsters can inflict on them, the sharpness of their weapon or the quantity of ammunition for certain weapon types, and the limitations of items they can bring on a quest that restricts how much they can recover while in the field. If the player successfully completes the quest, they gain reward resources, often consisting of parts from that monster along with zenny, the in-game currency. The distribution of rewards from a quest is determined by rarity, so obtaining certain rare parts may require repeating a quest several times.

World features a story mode offered through the quest system. Unlike previous games, where the story only followed "Low Rank" quests, before opening the game to more difficult "High Rank" quests without a story driver, World's narrative continues into High Rank. Instead of quests that required the player to slay a number of smaller monsters or collect resources, World offers these as bounties that can be achieved alongside the main quests, or provided as optional quests that generally lead to improving some facet of the resources in Astera. A player can have up to six different bounties active, and which provide rewards when they are completed. The player can gain investigation quests as well, which come from investigating the trail of monsters with Scoutflies or by breaking off parts of monsters in combat. Each investigation offers a quest that may have unique limitations or goals compared to main story quests, such as time limits or reduced fainting limits but also provide additional rewards; investigations can only be attempted, successfully or not, a limited number of times before they are removed.

=== Multiplayer ===
The game supports both single-player and up to four player cooperative mode while online; there is no local offline multiplayer. The game's quest system is the same in both modes. Players gather in multiplayer servers supporting up to sixteen players, during which they can post quests to invite others to join, or join other existing quests as long as they have progressed far enough in the game's storyline. If there are only one or two hunters on a quest, each brings with them a Palico (an anthropomorphic sentient cat species) to assist them in combat; these Palico can be equipped with weapons and armor crafted in the same manner as the hunter themselves. If there are fewer than four players in a party, a party member can launch an SOS flare, which other players in the server can opt to join. The game also supports Squads, the equivalent of clans or guilds in typical massively multiplayer online games. The game allows players in different release regions to work together, providing a pre-determined set of common greetings and commands that are translated to the various languages. However, players are limited to cooperating with those on the same platform, and will not feature cross-platform play. Players also need to register with their console's service (PlayStation Network or Xbox Live) to use multiplayer features.

In addition to quests shipped with the game, Capcom has offered downloadable content (DLC) quests, similarly featured in the handheld versions. However, with the greater degree of connectivity offered by modern consoles/computers compared to handheld systems, Capcom has been able to offer several time-limited Event quests that players can join through the new matchmaking system. Through the event system, the game has included limited-time unique gameplay modes, such as a 16-person raid against a single monster, with players working in teams of four to help defeat the monster. Capcom has also added new monsters to hunt through free downloadable content; the first such update, adding in the Deviljho monster from previous games was released alongside other quality-of-life updates in March 2018. Capcom also expected to provide paid post-content material as well; however, Capcom does not see World as a live service game. There is paid downloadable content available for the game, but with the exception of the Iceborne expansion, these are limited to cosmetic items only, such as gestures, character customization options, and stickers used in communicating with other players. The game will not include any microtransactions that influence gameplay; Tsujimoto said that as Monster Hunter is meant as a cooperative game, they did not want to create any type of "friction" between players due to some having simply purchased better equipment with real-world funds compared to those that spent the time to work through challenges to acquire the equipment.

== Synopsis ==
In an unnamed high fantasy setting, humans and other sentient races have set their eyes on the New World, a separate continent from the populated Old World. The New World is an untamed wilderness where many powerful monsters roam free, and where researchers have been drawn to uncover new mysteries. Several ocean-bound Fleets have been sent already to establish working bases, safe from monsters, and operations are led by the Research Commission.

Characters of this game are Handler, Commander, Admiral, Field Team Leader, Seeker, Second Fleet Master, Third Fleet Master, Huntsman, Analytics Director, Tracker, Excitable A-Lister, Provisions Manager, Chief Ecologist, Tech Chief, Captain and Serious Handler.

=== Plot ===
The player controls a hunter that they can name, supported by an assistant handler, and a palico who are a part of the Fifth Fleet which has been summoned by the Research Commission to provide more support to the New World. A particular focus of the Expedition is to study Elder Dragons, powerful beasts that can affect entire ecosystems, and why they migrate to the New World every ten years in an event known as the Elder Crossing. While traveling to the New World, the Fifth Fleet encounters Zorah Magdaros, a massive, volcanic, turtle-like Elder Dragon the size of a mountain. After being rescued and arriving at the base camp, known as Astera, the Hunter and their Handler undertake various tasks to explore the area and study Zorah Magdaros at the behest of the Commander of the Expedition. The Expedition determines that Zorah Magdaros is dying and is migrating to a massive graveyard, known as the Rotten Vale. An Expedition-led capture mission against Zorah Magdaros is foiled by Nergigante, a spiked Elder Dragon that feeds on other Elder Dragons, and is protecting Zorah Magdaros as its future meal. After escaping the ambush, Zorah Magdaros unexpectedly enters the Everstream, a massive underground river that runs under the entire New World, rather than traveling to the Rotten Vale. After further investigations, the Expedition learns that if Zorah Magdaros dies within the Everstream, its released bio-energy will destroy the New World. With no time to evacuate, the Expedition develops an emergency plan to intercept Zorah Magdaros and drive it to the ocean, where its released bio-energy will form a new aquatic ecosystem. Nergigante once again interferes, but this time is driven off by the Hunters, and Zorah Magdaros is successfully driven into the ocean.

However, when Nergigante flees to the Elder's Recess, a volcanic environment covered in the crystallized bioenergy of Elder Dragons, the presence of Nergigante drives away its Elder Dragon prey toward neighboring locations, upsetting each individual ecosystem. With the help of the Admiral, the true leader of the Expedition, the Hunter is able to track down and kill Nergigante. With Nergigante dead, the Elder Dragons calm down and return to the Recess. After their defeat by the Hunter, the source of energy within the Elder's Recess is discovered: Xeno'jiiva, an infant, yet highly dangerous Elder Dragon, which had been incubating within the Elder's Recess, and was feeding on the bio-energy of dead Elder Dragons. Xeno'jiiva hatches upon being discovered, and at the behest of the Admiral, the Hunter kills it before it can wreak havoc on the world. With the Elder Crossing now fully understood, the Expedition is considered finished, but members are offered the chance to stay in the New World to continue their research.

== Development ==
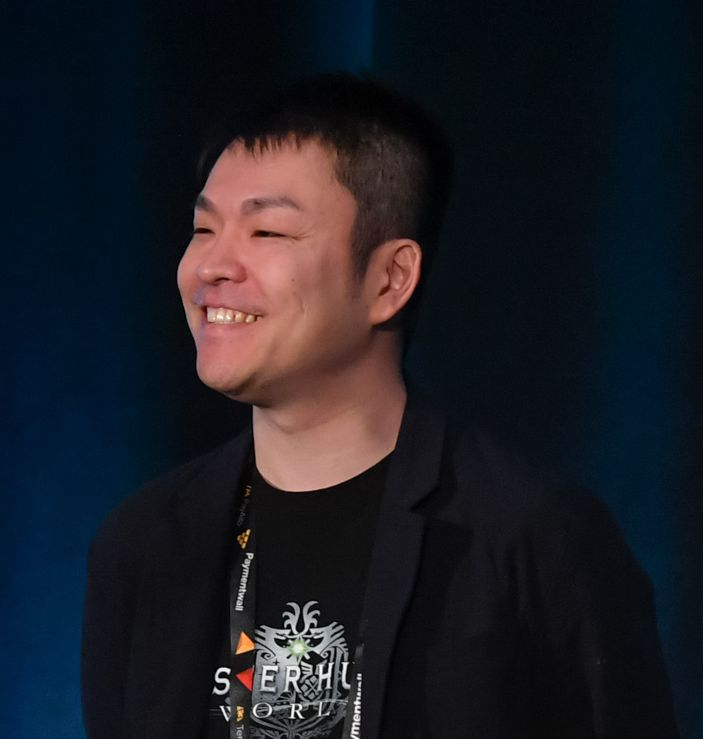
Monster Hunter: World director Yuya Tokuda at the 2018 Game Developers Conference

Monster Hunter: World is considered the fifth installment in the Monster Hunter series, according to the game's senior producer Ryozo Tsujimoto and director Yuya Tokuda. Along with executive director Kaname Fujioka, Tokuda served as a director for Monster Hunter 4 and Monster Hunter 4 Ultimate. Development of World started about three years prior to the E3 2017 reveal, following a year of brainstorming on what the next core title in the series would be. With the series more than a decade old, Capcom re-evaluated where they wanted to take the series, and concluded that with the hardware capabilities of the new consoles, they could realize a different vision compared to the handheld entries. According to Capcom Europe's COO Stuart Turner and marketing director for the Europe, the Middle East and Africa Antoine Molant, the divisions of Capcom outside of Japan had suggested for Capcom to embrace a Western release with full online gaming support. The Japanese teams had been wary of this, since the series normally assured them of three to four million sales within Japan and they would risk those assured numbers by making the game more global. However, the risks of taking a more worldwide approach were embraced when Sony said they would help support this approach, since they believed this would also help to boost PlayStation 4 sales. Additionally, the sheer scale of the project also used a large budget which they deemed necessary to "go up against Hollywood movies", and cost-cutting measures had to be adopted throughout Capcom.

Tsujimoto said that past games typically had arcane rules, and the zoned-area structure made each zone feel isolated, and wanted to change that approach. They have also wanted to implement living worlds and ecosystems, with complex artificial intelligence interactions between monsters and the environment but have been limited in the past by handheld gaming hardware. The team determined that they would pursue highly detailed worlds that felt realistic, eliminating the disconnected zoned-map approach. This created a "ripple effect" of changes in gameplay; for example, elimination of loading screens meant the player could not use the tactic of jumping to a different zone to heal in safety, and thus allowed the player to drink healing potions while walking. Tokuda noted that with these changes, the pace of the game also became quicker. A prototype of this more open world approach took about 18 months to complete by November 2015 with a team of 50-70 developers to test the seamless transition in the map, and how monsters would behave in these varied environments. The environments were such a focus that the original prototype did not even feature a combat system; enemy monsters had to be evaded or dispatched through other means. This also helped the team recognize that player survival during hunts by effective use of the environment, either for protection or as means to harm monsters via destructible components, and of monsters themselves, luring one to an area to draw out another, could be a key part of World's gameplay.

While the game features monsters already created from previous games in the series, the developers also crafted new monsters that took advantage of the benefits from more powerful processing hardware. A design of a new monster typically began around developing a certain gameplay challenge or mechanic for the monster's behavior that the player may need to exploit to defeat it, and then working with the level designers to find or help craft an area in the region maps to have that monster inhabit that allows for that behavior to be shown off. This in turn helped to establish the look and other behavior of the monster so that it felt like it belonged in that particular region. Individual features of the monsters could now be more directly animated compared to the previous games, such as showing feathers on bird-like monsters having natural-appearing movements, or having monsters take on different forms. In one case, the monster Nergigante was designed to have thorns all over its body that grow over time as it becomes more aggressive; with the ability to render monsters in more detail, they could show each of these thousand-some thorns moving and growing on their own, which directly affects how the player interacts with it in combat, making it a creature they could not have previously used in early games. Monster animation was developed in part with motion capture, with human actors acting out some of the various monster actions. Sets of rules were developed for the monsters to follow to interact in their environment, but they did not resort to any type of scripted event. This often created unexpected monster behavior when testing or demonstrating the game to public audiences. Once monsters were created, then they used those to develop the various weapon and armors that could be crafted from those monster parts to give a consistent feel to the game.

As they worked towards this, Capcom found that this more open world would be something better appreciated by Western audiences. The Monster Hunter series has generally languished in sales in Western markets due to the complexity of the game, high learning curves, and the preference of console and PC gaming in Western audiences compared to the popularity of portable gaming in Japan. The team felt the new approach to the game would be something that would mesh well with Western markets, and starting adopting the game to include more Western standards in controls and interface design. They also looked to provide more tutorial information as well as making these fully voiced, as to avoid unskippable dialogue boxes that had been used in the past. With these changes came the decision to make the game a worldwide release with inter-region play, as they believed they would be able to draw more Western players with the gameplay changes they have made. Tsujimoto and Tokuda recognized that World would be the first Monster Hunter game that many in the Western regions will likely play, so wanted to make sure the game was accessible to those players without having played any of the previous games. They also were aware of past criticisms that the games were very hard to learn though provided a rewarding experience once learned, so aimed to include means to help ease the learning curve and provide more information to the starting player.

Fujioka responded to some initial criticism of the Western-driven changes to the game that they were not trying to make the game easier just to drive sales: "We're not taking things that people in the west hate and fixing them to make western players buy it. People sometimes make that assumption, or they've got that fear, but that's not the case at all." He continued that some of the changes that seem to favor Western audiences were necessitated by the highly interconnected maps, and that "the new gameplay has to mesh with the new concept or else it would just be a mess." Tokuda said that they were not simplifying the game, but instead "It's more that we want to have this great core action gameplay where players observe monster behaviour and then learn how to take advantage of that and manipulate that to assist in hunting them. We want to make it so that if they make mistakes they don't feel it's unfair but instead think that it's their mistake and they have to grow and learn." Most of the changes made were thus specifically to reduce the difficulty curve to make it easier for new players to grasp the concepts of the game, but otherwise not changing the core difficulty. Tsujimoto also said that as they have been working on the series for more than a decade, they are aware of what fans expect of a Monster Hunter game, saying "we want Monster Hunter fans to feel like this is a Monster Hunter game through and through when they play it".

The subtitle "World" alludes to many facets of the game's design changes from past Monster Hunter games: it reflects that the maps are no longer connected zones but wide-open worlds, that these maps represent living worlds in and of themselves, that the game had a simultaneous worldwide release, and that it plays on worldwide servers rather than being segmented by region. Capcom opted not to use a numerical title, such as Monster Hunter 5, as that would give the impression that players needed to have completed other games in the series to play this one. Tsujimoto and Tokuda said they add a unique gameplay element with each Monster Hunter, and as such, the "Hunter Arts" and "Prowler" Modes from Generations were not included. However, they have re-evaluated all the existing weapon classes to add new moves and abilities to provide a fresh take on the series for veteran players.

While their main Monster Hunter development team from Osaka developed the core, Capcom brought in other programmers familiar with the newer consoles to help with bringing the game to those systems. The game uses a modified version of Capcom's internally developed MT Framework engine which provided a minimum of 30 frames per seconds on all platforms. The PlayStation 4 and the Xbox One version includes ultra-high resolutions and other improved features for the PlayStation 4 Pro and Xbox One X. When they had started development, neither of these console refreshes had been announced, and by the time the specifications for both were released (around 2016), Capcom recognized they did not have time to evaluate the specifications fully without changing the release window, but were aided by support of both Sony and Microsoft to help make World run efficiently on these newer consoles. For these, the game includes options to run between a detailed graphical version, lowering the game's framerate, or with reduced graphical details to maintain a high framerate.

Tsujimoto and Tokuda said the delay on the Windows version release was to make sure it was "optimized and fine-tuned for the PC as much as possible", with all work being done internally within Capcom to avoid treating the game as an outsourced port. They also seek to have Monster Hunter: World support a wide variety of personal computer configurations, and need the additional time to achieve this broad range. Additionally, the Windows platform lacks the built-in matchmaking that is in Xbox Live or PlayStation Network, requiring them to build their own version for this. Tsujimoto announced in January 2018 that they are aiming for a Windows release in the second half of 2018, looking to get the console versions released so that they can spend their full attention towards the Windows port.

There are no plans for Monster Hunter: World to be released for the Nintendo Switch. Fujioka and Tokuda said that development started well before the Nintendo Switch was announced, and had focused the game to best play on the PlayStation 4 and Xbox One.

== Release ==
Announced at E3 2017, Monster Hunter: World was released worldwide for the PlayStation 4 and Xbox One on January 26, 2018. In addition to digital and normal physical releases, the game was shipped with a Collector's Edition that includes an art book, a CD with the game's soundtrack, and a statue of one of the monsters from the game. A limited run of PlayStation 4 Pro consoles emblazoned with Monster Hunter: World art was released in Japan on December 7, 2017. A three-disc original soundtrack of the game's music was released in Japan on February 14, 2018, composed by Tadayoshi Makino, Zhenlan Kang, Akihiko Narita, and Yuko Komiyama.

A limited demo, exclusive to PlayStation Plus members, was offered from December 9–12, 2017; the demo included practice areas for all fourteen weapon types, and three hunting quests that can be completed alone in solo play or using the networked cooperative support planned for the full game. Players that completed the three quests received bonus in-game items and a cosmetic item when the main game was released. A second demo period for PlayStation 4, no longer requiring PlayStation Plus, ran between December 22–26, 2017, and a final beta period, adding one additional quest, ran from January 19–22, 2018.

Originally announced alongside the console versions, a Windows version was released on August 9, 2018. Tsujimoto said while they will try to release new content updates for all platforms as soon as possible, the Windows version may see updates come out later; for this reason, they do not anticipate supporting cross-platform play between versions. The initial version was released with graphics parity with the console versions, with plans to offer a post-release patch for graphic updates; this patch was released for free in April 2019, and included both high-definition textures and additional graphics options for players. With its major Iceborne title update in April 2020, Capcom plans that all future updates will be simultaneous between the Windows and console versions.

Tencent managed the release of World for personal computer users in China via its WeGame platform. However, less than a week after its release, Tencent was forced to pull sales of the games, after there were numerous complaints made to Chinese authorities about the online content of the game. Normally, the State Administration of Radio and Television (SART) would have issued a license for Tencent to distribute the game after reviewing it for content, but SART has not issued any licenses for video games since March 2018, after the agency was reformed by the government to strengthen the government's oversight of online activities. While players could still play the game in offline mode, Tencent offered full refunds over the following two weeks.

=== Cross-promotional content ===
As with previous games in the series, Monster Hunter: World has offered limited time quests that involve cross-promotion of other Capcom properties and from other third-parties. PlayStation 4 players can play as Aloy from Horizon Zero Dawn. Since release, other events have offered costumes and other elements based on Mega Man, Street Fighter's Ryu and Sakura, and Devil May Cry's Dante.

A cross-promotional event for Monster Hunter: World and Final Fantasy XIV was released in both games in August 2018. Players of Final Fantasy XIV may fight Monster Hunter's Rathalos, while players from World may fight the Final Fantasy monster Behemoth. This collaboration had been several years in the making; during the rebuilding of Final Fantasy XIV around 2011, Tsujimoto contacted Final Fantasy XIV director Naoki Yoshida, a friend from years prior, and, recognizing the scope of rebuilding, offered any help they could from the Capcom and Monster Hunter teams. While Yoshida declined the offer at the time, both recognized they wanted their respective games to be of equal quality and success. Yoshida later met with Tsujimoto at the start of Monster Hunter: World's development. Learning that Capcom was seeking to expand Monster Hunter to a global audience, Yoshida offered the idea of the potential cross-promotion between their games, and the two began working out the details and implementation.

A cross-promotional event with the Assassin's Creed series in late December 2018 gave the player the opportunity to gain armor pieces to mimic either the character of Ezio from Assassin's Creed II or Bayek from Assassin's Creed Origins. Another cross-promotion event first released in February 2019 includes The Witcher 3: Wild Hunt, allowing the player to hunt as Geralt of Rivia or Ciri.

Similar cross-promotional content continued with Iceborne, with a crossover with Capcom's Resident Evil series in November 2019 bringing character outfits based on Leon S. Kennedy and Claire Redfield, alongside other elements from the series. A promotion event tying in with the Monster Hunter film was held in December 2020 ahead of the film's release.

=== Related media ===
Viz Media published the artbook for the game, Monster Hunter World Official Complete Works, in Japan in January 2018, and has planned to publish the book with English translations in Western regions in mid-2020.

Capcom has published the game's soundtrack as both retail packing, digital downloads, and part of several of its properties' soundtracks to streaming services like Spotify.

Steamforged Games launched a Kickstarter to develop a licensed board game based on Monster Hunter: World in April 2021 with expected publishing in September 2022. The campaign met its initial funding goals of €150,000 (~$180,000) within ten minutes of launching, and ultimately ended up raising €3,448,262 (~$4,144,121) from 20,398 backers (excluding Late Pledges). After its success, Steamforged expanded on the release with Monster Hunter World: Iceborne and Monster Hunter World: Wildspire Waste. Upon release, GamesRadar praised it for the quality of its monster miniatures, high replayability, and varied playstyles. Polygon likewise praised its miniatures as "spectacular". Dexterto felt it was a successful adaptation of the video game, with strategic positioning and teamwork that emulated the monster-hunting mechanics.

== Reception ==
Reception

Aggregate scores
Aggregator	Score
Metacritic	PS4: 90/100; XONE: 90/100; PC: 88/100
OpenCritic	96% recommend 96% recommend(Iceborne)

Review scores
Publication	Score
Destructoid	9/10
Edge	9/10
Electronic Gaming Monthly	9/10
Famitsu	39/40
Game Informer	9.5/10
GameSpot	8/10
GamesRadar+	5/5
IGN	9.5/10
PC Gamer (US)	86/100
Polygon	9/10
VideoGamer.com	9/10

Monster Hunter: World received "universal acclaim" from critics on Xbox One and PlayStation 4, and a "generally favourable" reception on PC, according to review aggregator website Metacritic.

Reviewers generally praised the game for being able to retain and not sacrifice the core Monster Hunter formula while opening it up to be amenable for new players to the series, being able to take advantage of the higher processing power of consoles compared to handhelds to make the game's worlds feel more alive, though still noted that there are elements of learning the game mechanics and the difficulty curve that can still be somewhat daunting to inexperienced players.

Prior to the game's release, long-time fans of the series established an unofficial "Adopt-A-Hunter" program, where players experienced to the series would be paired up with novice and new players to help teach them about many of the core gameplay strategies and subtle features of Monster Hunter: World. The program was created by fans recognizing that World would likely be the first game in the series for many in the Western regions, and was designed to help these players understand the game and manage the steep learning curve as to help bring more players to the community and make the series successful in the West. While such efforts have been part of the Monster Hunter community since its release, the broader distribution of World was expected to be more amenable to this adoption program.

=== Sales ===
Monster Hunter: World shipped over five million copies three days after release, including digital sales, which exceeded all other previous games in the series. According to Famitsu, 1.35 million copies were sold at retail in Japan during these three days, and an estimated 2 million sales including digital sales; these were accompanied by a boost in PlayStation 4 console sales in the same week, with over 140,000 consoles sold. Two weeks after release, Capcom announced that its overall shipment numbers had risen to 6 million, making World the fastest-selling Monster Hunter game and the fastest-selling game of any of their properties. With this, World became Capcom's fourth highest-selling game. NPD Group reported that World was the top-selling game in the United States within both January and February 2018.

Capcom announced that the game's combined physical shipments and digital sales were over eight million copies by April 2018, making World Capcom's highest-selling game and helping them reach their most profitable fiscal year in its history. Just prior to the game's Windows release, Capcom reported that the number had risen to more than 8.3 million, which helped to raise its quarterly profit by nearly 50% from the previous year.

Digital sales of the game challenged those of PlayerUnknown's Battlegrounds on Xbox One's marketplace, which had held the top sales position for two months prior; in the United States, World surpassed Battlegrounds in the second week of its release, while it came just behind Battlegrounds for the United Kingdom charts. On the PlayStation Network, World topped the store's online sales charts in both the United States and Europe for the month of January 2018. World also ranked first in Australia. At the 2018 PlayStation Awards, it received the Quadruple Platinum Prize for topping four million sales on the PlayStation 4 platform in Asia.

During the month of July 2018, following the announcement of the Windows release of Monster Hunter: World, pre-orders for the game were regularly on the top 10 selling games on Steam. Additionally, Tencent, which manages the WeGame distribution platform in China, reported they had seen over a million pre-orders during the month. On release on Steam, World saw over 240,000 concurrent players that day, the largest concurrent player count for any game on Steam at launch in 2018, and the largest of any Japanese-published game on Steam prior. In August 2018, Capcom announced that Monster Hunter: World had shipped over 10 million copies between all platforms, elevating the total sales of the Monster Hunter series to over 50 million units. With the Windows' release, the game once again ranked second in sales in the United States for August 2018, based on NPD Group's data. World was one of the top twelve highest-selling games on Steam in 2018, and was one of ten games on Steam that had a peak player count of over 100,000 during the year. Capcom reported that as of March 2019, the Windows platform was the second-highest for sales of World globally, which has led Capcom to identify the platform as essential for its further games, particularly in European markets such as Germany and Russia, in which the PC version was stated by Capcom's EMEA and UK marketing director to perform "extremely well".

At a presentation at Tokyo Game Show 2018, Tsujimoto revealed that the game had crossed 10 million shipments worldwide, the greatest ever for a Monster Hunter game, and that for the first time ever the shipments outside of Japan had surpassed those inside Japan, with overseas shipments accounting for 71%. The success of Monster Hunter: World was considered by Capcom to be a "driving force" for its profitability over the financial year ending March 31, 2019, reaching over 12 million in total units shipped and making the title the best-selling game in Capcom's history. Total global shipments had surpassed over 14 million by October 2019.

Shortly after the Windows release of Iceborne on January 9, 2020, Capcom reported that total global shipments of the expansion on all platforms had exceeded 4 million, with total sales of World exceeding 15 million and bringing the total sales of the Monster Hunter series to over 61 million. By the end of Capcom's 2019 fiscal year on March 31, 2020, total shipments of World exceeded 15.5 million and Iceborne exceeded 5 million. World shipments surpassed 20 million units by October 2021, and Iceborne reached 8.5 million units sold as of September 2021.

Following the December 2023 announcement of Monster Hunter Wilds, Capcom launched a "Return to World" campaign to spur interest. This led to World rising to the top of simultaneous player counts on Steam during that month, with over 100,000 concurrent players at points. Capcom said following this that World had over 23 million sales by January 2024, and over 30 million by July 2026.By October 2026, it has sold 30.83 million copies.

=== Accolades ===
Year	Award	Category	Result	Ref(s).
2017	Gamescom 2017	Best Booth Award	Nominated	
2017	Gamescom 2017	Best Console Game (PlayStation 4)	Nominated	
2017	Gamescom 2017	Best Multiplayer Game	Nominated	
2017	The Game Awards 2017	Most Anticipated Game	Nominated	
2018	Japan Game Awards	Game of the Year	Won	
2018	Japan Game Awards	Excellence Award	Won	
2018	Golden Joystick Awards	Best Visual Design	Nominated	
2018	Golden Joystick Awards	Best Audio Design	Nominated	
2018	Golden Joystick Awards	Best Co-operative Game	Won	
2018	Golden Joystick Awards	Ultimate Game of the Year	Nominated	
2018	The Game Awards 2018	Game of the Year	Nominated	
2018	The Game Awards 2018	Best RPG Game	Won	
2018	The Game Awards 2018	Best Multiplayer Game	Nominated	
2018	Gamers' Choice Awards	Fan Favorite Game	Nominated	
2018	Gamers' Choice Awards	Fan Favorite Multiplayer Game	Nominated	
2018	Gamers' Choice Awards	Fan Favorite Role-Playing Game	Won	
2018	Titanium Awards	Best Role-Playing Game	Nominated	
2018	Australian Games Awards	Multiplayer/Online Title of the Year	Nominated	
2018	Australian Games Awards	RPG of the Year	Nominated	
2018	Australian Games Awards	Game of the Year	Nominated	
2019	New York Game Awards	Big Apple Award for Best Game of the Year	Nominated	
2019	New York Game Awards	Statue of Liberty Award for Best World	Nominated	
2019	22nd Annual D.I.C.E. Awards	Role-Playing Game of the Year	Won	
2019	NAVGTR Awards 2019	Game of the Year	Nominated	
2019	NAVGTR Awards 2019	Character Design	Nominated	
2019	NAVGTR Awards 2019	Design, Franchise	Nominated	
2019	SXSW Gaming Awards 2019	Excellence in Multiplayer	Nominated	
2019	SXSW Gaming Awards 2019	Trending Game of the Year	Nominated	
2019	Famitsu Awards	Game of the Year	Won	
2019	Famitsu Awards	Excellence Prize	Won	
2019	Italian Video Game Awards	People's Choice	Nominated	
2019	Italian Video Game Awards	Game of the Year	Nominated	
2019	Italian Video Game Awards	Best Game Design	Nominated	
2019	Italian Video Game Awards	Best Evolving Game	Nominated	
2019	Game Critics Awards	Best Ongoing Game	Nominated	
