= The Game Awards 2018 =

Video games award show

- Date: December 6, 2018
- Venue: Microsoft Theater, Los Angeles
- Country: United States
- Hosted by: Geoff Keighley

Highlights
- Most awards: Red Dead Redemption 2 (4)
- Most nominations: God of War; Red Dead Redemption 2 (8)
- Game of the Year: God of War
- Industry Icon: Greg Thomas
- Website: thegameawards.com

Online coverage
- Runtime: 2 hours, 49 minutes
- Viewership: 26.2 million
- Produced by: Geoff Keighley; Kimmie Kim
- Directed by: Richard Preuss

The Game Awards 2018 was an award show that honored the best video games of 2018. It was produced and hosted by Geoff Keighley, creator and producer of The Game Awards, and was held to an invited audience at the Microsoft Theater in Los Angeles on December 6, 2018. The event was live streamed across more than 45 digital platforms. The show featured musical performances from Harry Gregson-Williams, Daniel Lanois, Lena Raine, and Hans Zimmer, and presentations from celebrity guests including Jonah Hill, the Russo brothers, Brendon Urie, and Christoph Waltz. The show opened with a group speech by Nintendo's Reggie Fils-Aimé, PlayStation's Shawn Layden, and Xbox's Phil Spencer, representing the unity of the industry. Keighley began planning for the show immediately after the previous ceremony, and spent months traveling to studios around the world to secure announcements and trailers.

God of War and Red Dead Redemption 2 received eight nominations each, the most in Game Awards history at the time. (Note: God of War and Red Dead Redemption 2's eight nomination record was beaten by Death Stranding's eleven nominations at The Game Awards 2019.) At the show, Red Dead Redemption 2 tied for the highest-awarded game in the show's history with four wins, (Note: The other games that received four awards were Overwatch in 2016 and Death Stranding in 2019. This record was beaten by The Last of Us Part II's seven wins in 2020.) and God of War was awarded Game of the Year. Several new games were revealed, including Far Cry New Dawn, Hades, and The Outer Worlds. In association with the event, sales were held on most digital storefronts for nominees and former winners. The 2018 was viewed by over 26.2 million streams, the most in its history to date, (Note: The viewership record was beaten in 2019 with 45.2 million streams.) with four million concurrent viewers at its peak. It received a generally positive reception from media publications, with praise directed at the opening speech and announcements but some criticism for the focus on reveals over awards.

== Background ==
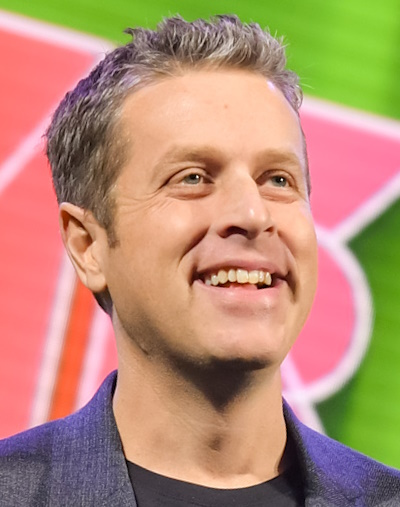
Host and producer Geoff Keighley spent months traveling to studios around the world to secure announcements for the show.

As with previous iterations of The Game Awards, the show was hosted and produced by Canadian games journalist Geoff Keighley. He returned as an executive producer alongside Kimmie Kim, and Richard Preuss and LeRoy Bennett returned as director and creative director, respectively. Keighley began working on The Game Awards 2018 immediately after the previous ceremony by conducting a postmortem and booking the Microsoft Theater. He shifted into full work in July 2018 following E3. He spent months traveling to studios around the world to secure announcements and trailers, and meeting with developers to discuss how to reveal their games; he spent July and August meeting with distribution partners in China and visiting ten game studios (including FromSoftware, Kojima Productions, and PlatinumGames) in Japan, followed by some time in Europe. He visited Rockstar Games's New York headquarters in September to discuss how to represent Red Dead Redemption 2 at the show.

The core team working on the show throughout the year consists of four or five people. The budget for 2018, determined in July, was several million dollars; Keighley personally funded the show while raising money from publishers and sponsors. Concepts were being considered by August, including the involvement of Hans Zimmer, who was originally involved in the previous show but dropped out due to other commitments. Keighley began to book presenters in October, having secured developers such as Josef Fares and Jeff Kaplan by mid-month; he spoke to Peter Jackson about a collaboration but it fell through. For the 2018 ceremony, the production team focused on stage lighting for immersion. Once the team approved Bennett's designs in September, they turned to the budgeting phase, where ideas were often cut. In late October, eleven members of the production team moved into a four-building office complex in Santa Monica, transitioning from virtual meetings; hundreds of people ultimately contributed to the production by December.

Keighley estimated he worked on the show for around 18 hours each day from August to November, and 19 hours for the final month. Kim felt she had a yin and yang dynamic with Keighley. She worried he would spend too much time concerned about minute details; Keighley agreed, noting he enjoyed the work and does not regret it but wanted to employ more people in future to shift his focus. Kim aimed for the show to be around 80 or 90 percent completed before Thanksgiving in November, when the team took a week off. To maintain secrecy, a security crew supervised rehearsals. Keighley kept secrets from his team and senior production members only learned of some announcements in the days before the show; trailers were only listed under code names with expected durations. Keighley wrote most of his own scripts, while Gabe Uhr and Kyle Bosman wrote for the presenters. During rehearsals, Keighley remained close to the Microsoft Theater by staying at the Ritz Carlton hotel across the street.

The show was held at the Microsoft Theater in Los Angeles on December 6, 2018. It was live streamed globally across more than 45 digital services. Tencent's Stephen Ma joined the awards as an advisor; the ceremony was live on more than 15 platforms in China. The ceremony began with a group speech by Nintendo's Reggie Fils-Aimé, PlayStation's Shawn Layden, and Xbox's Phil Spencer. Keighley had wanted to gather the three leaders since the show's inception in 2014 as he felt it was a metaphor for bringing the industry together. While all three leaders personally agreed to the speech, it took several months of negotiations before confirmation; Keighley felt it had "fallen apart" in the days before the show but "magically it came back together" in time. The Game Awards Orchestra opened the show with its new theme song, an original composition by its conductor Lorne Balfe, who had worked with Keighley on the Spike Video Game Awards. He wrote the piece to represent Keighley's work and the general gaming community. Balfe suggested Zimmer and Harry Gregson-Williams perform alongside Celeste composer Lena Raine and Anthem composer Sarah Schachner to illustrate the industries of film, television, and video games combined. Schachner worried how Anthem's score would translate to an orchestral performance but, after arranging a shortened version of the game's theme, found "it started falling into place". For the Game of the Year medley, Balfe was forced to wait until the nominees were determined in mid-November; immediately after the announcement, the production team began contacting studios for the game soundtracks.

=== Announcements ===
During the event, sales on some nominated and previously-winning games were held on the Nintendo eShop, PlayStation Store, Steam, and Xbox Games Store. Announcements on recently released and upcoming games were made for:

- Ancestors: The Humankind Odyssey
- Anthem
- Dauntless
- Dead by Daylight
- Devil May Cry 5
- Fortnite
- Forza Horizon 4
- Magic: The Gathering Arena
- PlayerUnknown's Battlegrounds
- Psychonauts 2
- Rage 2
- Rocket League
- Super Smash Bros. Ultimate
- The Stanley Parable

New games announced during the ceremony included:

- Among Trees
- Atlas
- Crash Team Racing Nitro-Fueled
- Dragon Age 4
- Far Cry New Dawn
- Hades
- Journey to the Savage Planet
- The Last Campfire
- Marvel Ultimate Alliance 3: The Black Order
- Mortal Kombat 11
- The Outer Worlds
- The Pathless
- Sayonara Wild Hearts
- Scavengers
- Stranger Things 3: The Game
- Survived By

Keighley was contacted by Supergiant Games's Greg Kasavin and Amir Rao after the 2017 ceremony; they met at the D.I.C.E. Summit in February 2018 and pitched the reveal and early access launch of Hades. The Mortal Kombat 11 reveal was in the works for almost a year. The developers of The Last Night were in contact with Keighley to show the game but were forced to pull out a month or two prior due to a publisher dispute.

== Winners and nominees ==
The nominees for The Game Awards 2018 were announced on November 13, 2018; the announcement received more traffic than anticipated, with five times more visitors than usual, crashing the website for several hours. Any game released on or before November 16, 2018 was eligible for consideration. The nominees were compiled by a jury panel with members from 69 media outlets globally. Winners were determined between the jury (90 percent) and public votes (10 percent); the latter was held via the official website and on social media platforms and technologies such as Amazon Alexa, Bilibili, Discord, Facebook Messenger, Google Assistant, and Twitter. Votes held on the official website and shared on social media were given an additional 10 percent weighting in the fan vote calculation. More than 10.5 million votes were registered, a 50 percent increase over the previous year.

The Trending Gamer award from previous shows was effectively split into two: Content Creator of the Year for those creating new and innovative video game content, such as live streamers and video creators; and the Global Gaming Citizens program, to recognize honorees improving their communities through video games. Additional esports awards were added for the 2018 show. Submissions for Best Student Game were open in September and October. They were judged by a panel of industry members including Jenova Chen, Todd Howard, Hideo Kojima, and Vince Zampella.

=== Awards ===
Winners are listed first, highlighted in boldface, and indicated with a double dagger (‡).

==== Video games ====
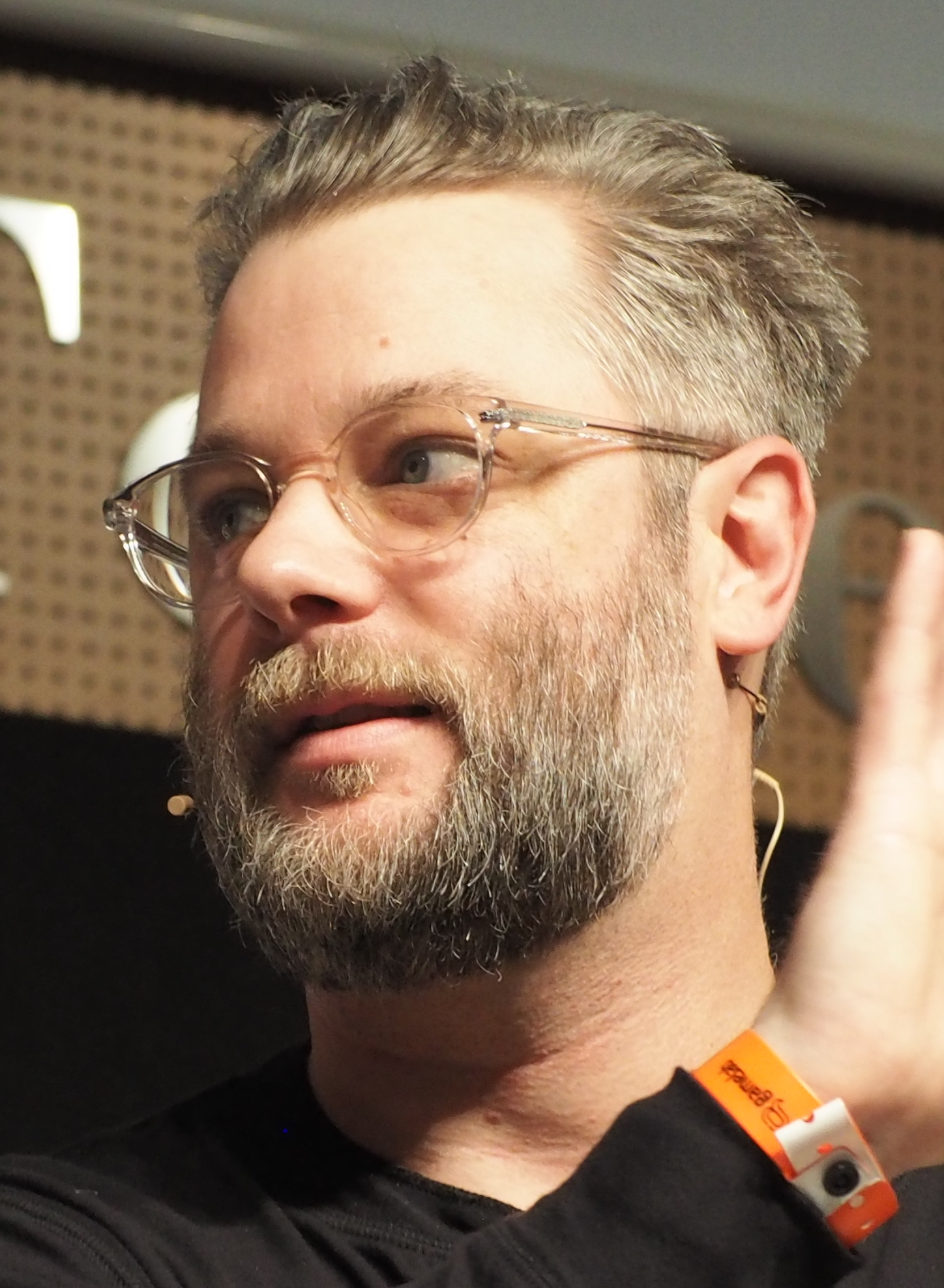
Cory Barlog won Best Game Direction and accepted Game of the Year for God of War.

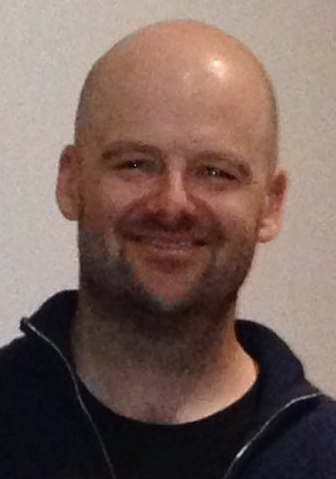
Dan Houser, co-winner of Best Narrative for Red Dead Redemption 2.

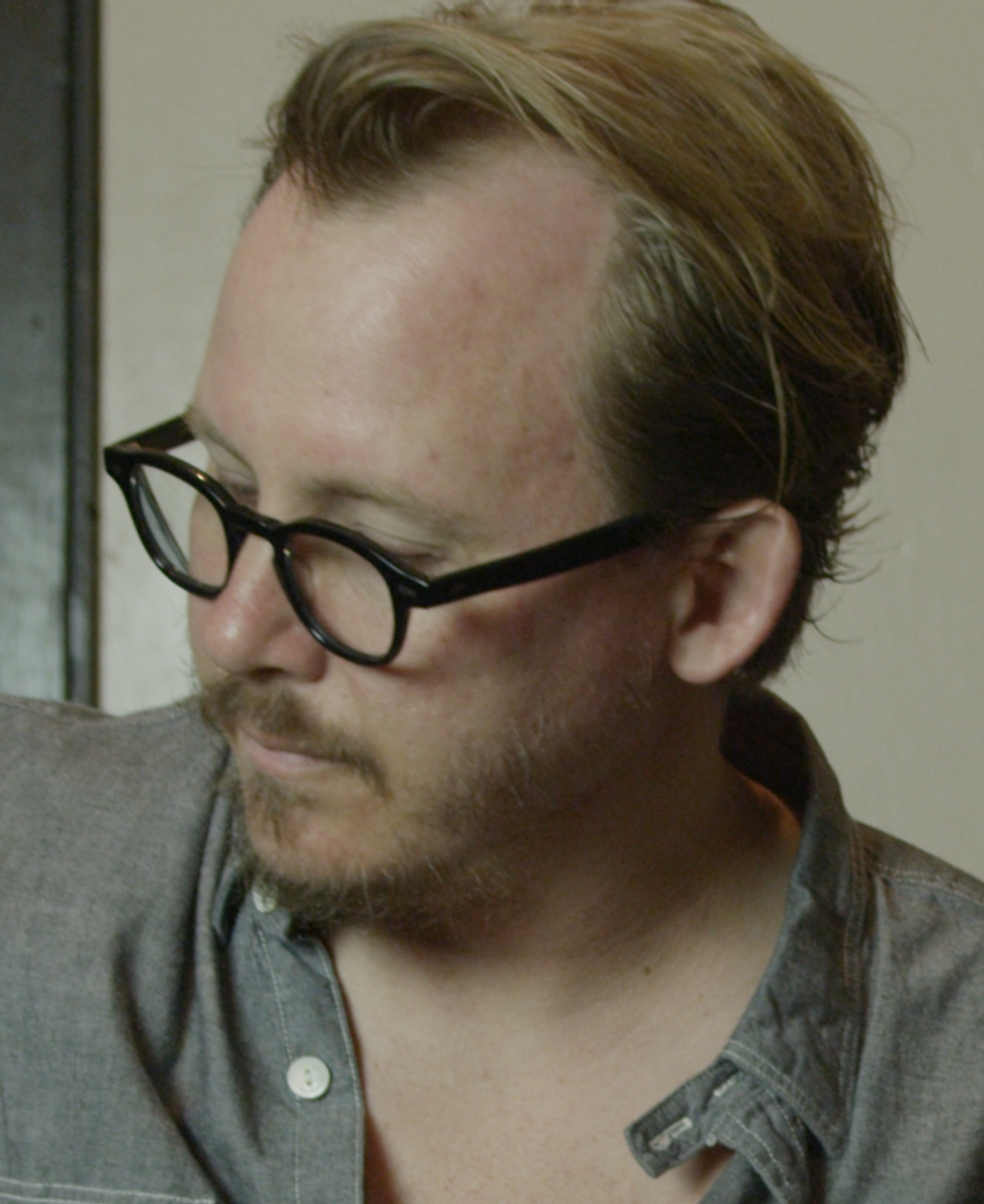
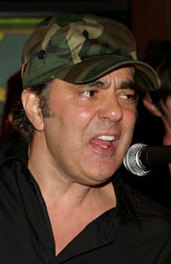
Woody Jackson (top) won Best Score/Music for his work on Red Dead Redemption 2, and accepted the award with Daniel Lanois (bottom), who produced the game's vocal tracks.

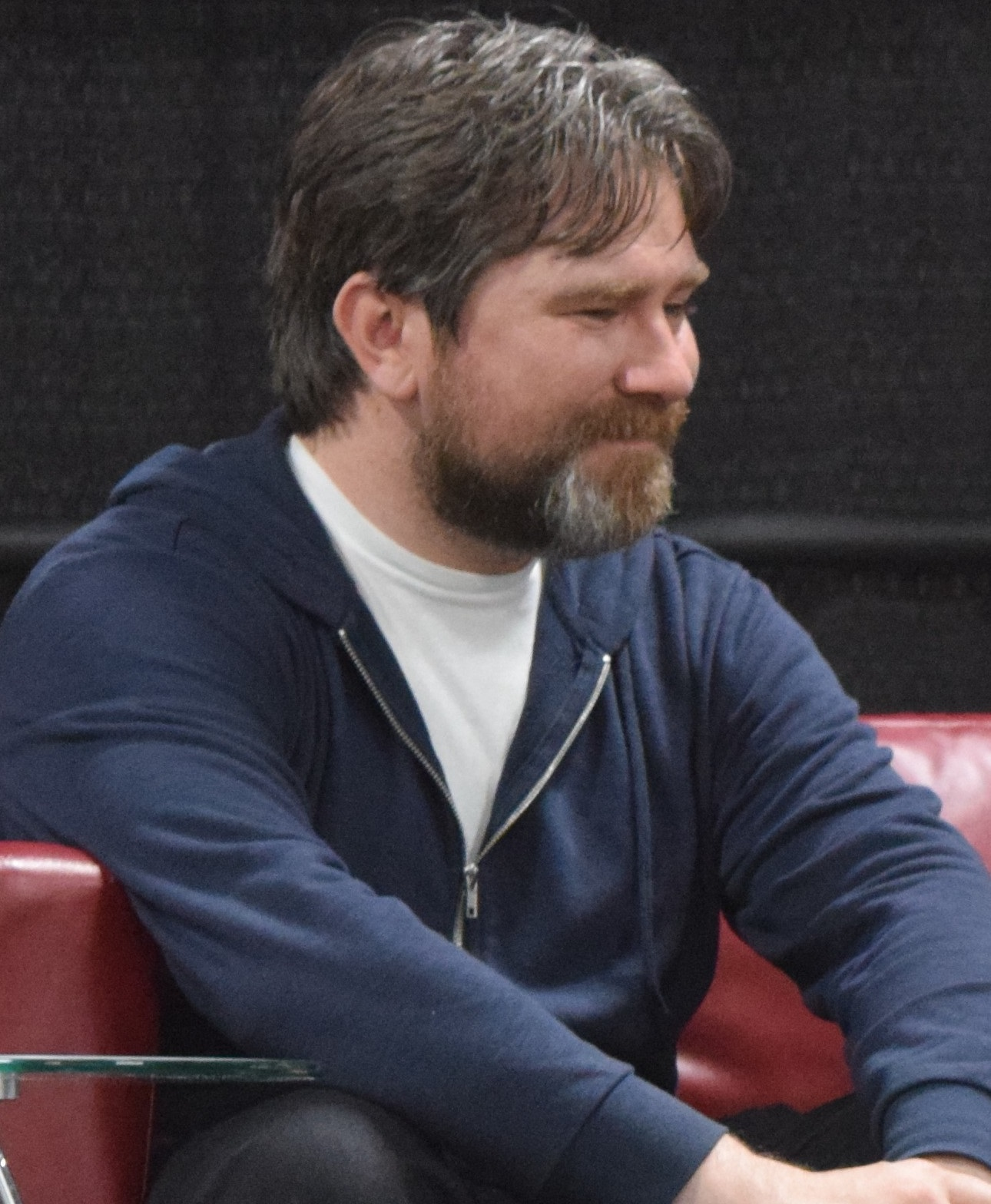
Roger Clark won Best Performance for his role as Arthur Morgan in Red Dead Redemption 2.

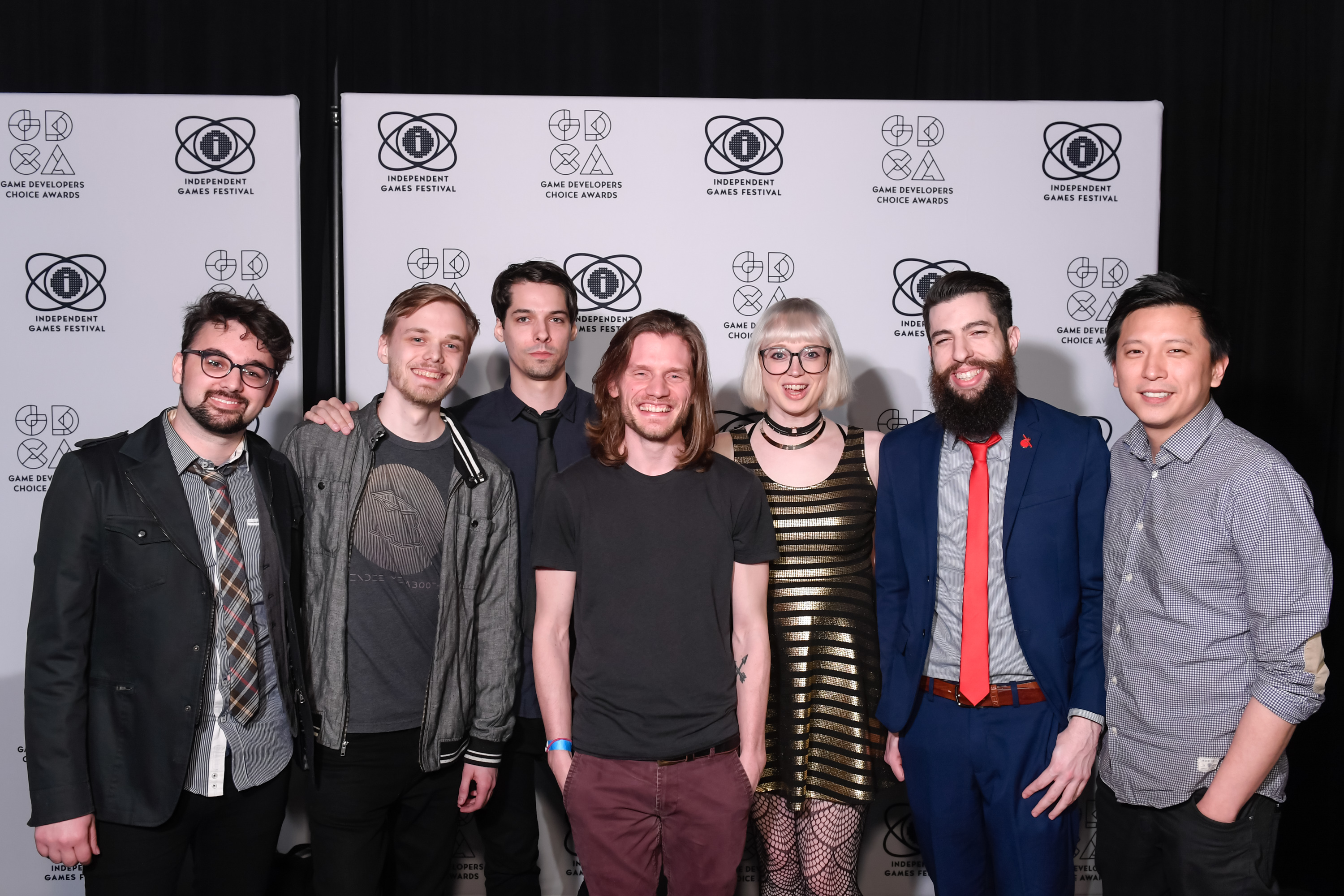
The team at Maddy Makes Games won Games for Impact and Best Independent Game for Celeste.

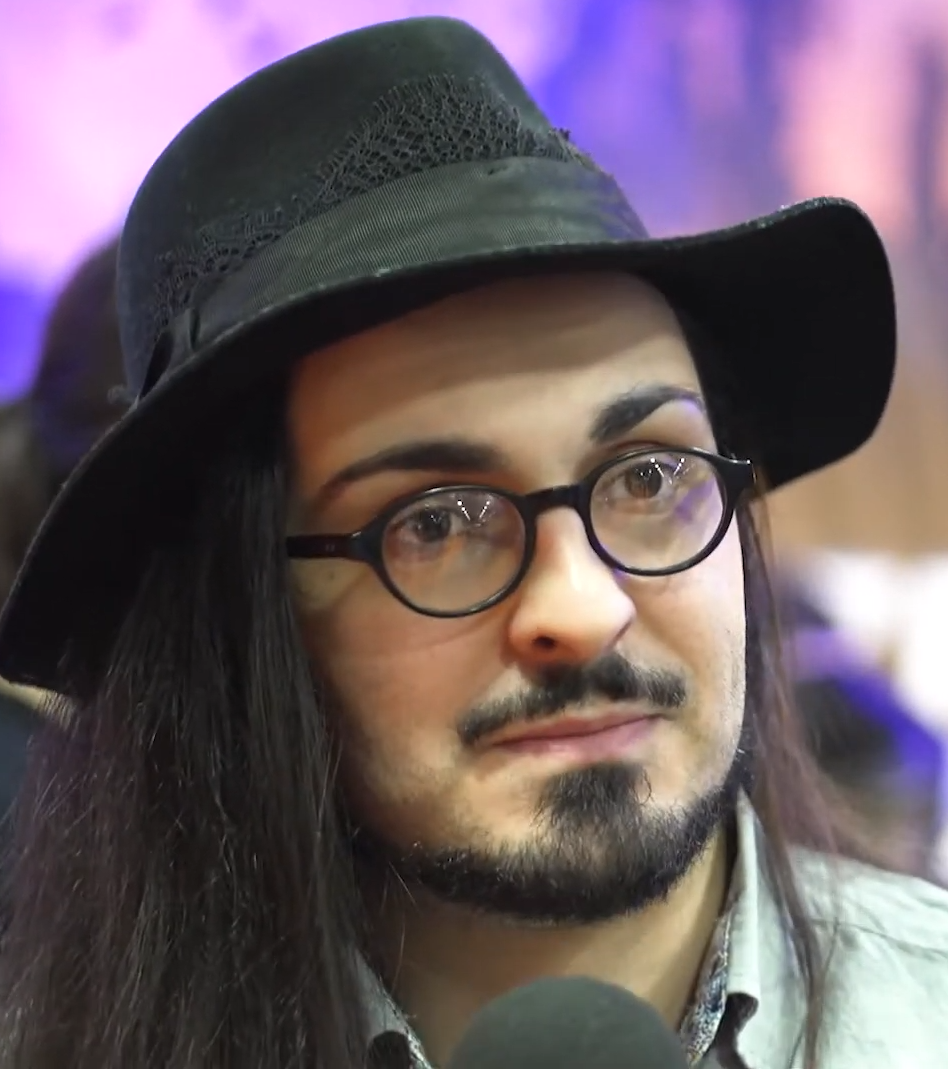
Yohann Laulan accepted the award for Best Action Game for Dead Cells alongside Benjamin Laulan.

Game of the Year	Best Game Direction
**God of War – Santa Monica Studio / Sony Interactive Entertainment**‡; Assassin's Creed Odyssey – Ubisoft Quebec / Ubisoft; Celeste – Maddy Makes Games; Marvel's Spider-Man – Insomniac Games / Sony Interactive Entertainment; Monster Hunter: World – Capcom; Red Dead Redemption 2 – Rockstar Games	**God of War – Santa Monica Studio / Sony Interactive Entertainment**‡; A Way Out – Hazelight Studios / Electronic Arts; Detroit: Become Human – Quantic Dream / Sony Interactive Entertainment; Marvel's Spider-Man – Insomniac Games / Sony Interactive Entertainment; Red Dead Redemption 2 – Rockstar Games
Best Narrative	Best Art Direction
**Red Dead Redemption 2 – Rockstar Games**‡; Detroit: Become Human – Quantic Dream / Sony Interactive Entertainment; God of War – Santa Monica Studio / Sony Interactive Entertainment; Life Is Strange 2: Episode 1 – Dontnod Entertainment / Square Enix; Marvel's Spider-Man – Insomniac Games / Sony Interactive Entertainment	**Return of the Obra Dinn – 3909 LLC**‡; Assassin's Creed Odyssey – Ubisoft Quebec / Ubisoft; God of War – Santa Monica Studio / Sony Interactive Entertainment; Red Dead Redemption 2 – Rockstar Games; Octopath Traveler – Square Enix Business Division 11, Acquire / Nintendo
Best Score/Music (Note: Presented in conjunction with Spotify)	Best Audio Design (Note: Presented in conjunction with Dolby)
**Red Dead Redemption 2 – Woody Jackson**‡; Celeste – Lena Raine; God of War – Bear McCreary; Marvel's Spider-Man – John Paesano; Ni no Kuni II: Revenant Kingdom – Joe Hisaishi; Octopath Traveler – Yasunori Nishiki	**Red Dead Redemption 2 – Rockstar Games**‡; Call of Duty: Black Ops 4 – Treyarch / Activision; Forza Horizon 4 – Playground Games / Microsoft Studios; God of War – Santa Monica Studio / Sony Interactive Entertainment; Marvel's Spider-Man – Insomniac Games / Sony Interactive Entertainment
Best Performance	Games for Impact
**Roger Clark as Arthur Morgan – Red Dead Redemption 2**‡; Bryan Dechart as Connor – Detroit: Become Human; Christopher Judge as Kratos – God of War; Yuri Lowenthal as Spider-Man – Marvel's Spider-Man; Melissanthi Mahut as Kassandra – Assassin's Creed Odyssey	**Celeste – Maddy Makes Games**‡; 11-11: Memories Retold – DigixArt, Aardman Animations / Bandai Namco Entertainment; Florence – Mountains / Annapurna Interactive; Life Is Strange 2: Episode 1 – Dontnod Entertainment / Square Enix; The Missing: J.J. Macfield and the Island of Memories – White Owls / Arc System Works
Best Ongoing Game	Best Independent Game
**Fortnite – Epic Games**‡; Destiny 2: Forsaken – Bungie / Activision; No Man's Sky – Hello Games; Overwatch – Blizzard Entertainment; Tom Clancy's Rainbow Six Siege – Ubisoft Montreal / Ubisoft	**Celeste – Maddy Makes Games**‡; Dead Cells – Motion Twin; Into the Breach – Subset Games; The Messenger – Sabotage / Devolver Digital; Return of the Obra Dinn – 3909 LLC
Best Mobile Game	Best VR/AR Game
**Florence – Mountains / Annapurna Interactive**‡; Donut County – Ben Esposito / Annapurna Interactive; Fortnite – Epic Games; PUBG Mobile – Lightspeed & Quantum / Tencent Games; Reigns: Game of Thrones – Nerial / Devolver Digital	**Astro Bot Rescue Mission – Japan Studio / Sony Interactive Entertainment**‡; Beat Saber – Beat Games; Firewall: Zero Hour – First Contact Entertainment / Sony Interactive Entertainment; Moss – Polyarc Games; Tetris Effect – Resonair / Enhance, Inc.
Best Action Game	Best Action/Adventure Game
**Dead Cells – Motion Twin**‡; Call of Duty: Black Ops 4 – Treyarch / Activision; Destiny 2: Forsaken – Bungie / Activision; Far Cry 5 – Ubisoft; Mega Man 11 – Capcom	**God of War – Santa Monica Studio / Sony Interactive Entertainment**‡; Assassin's Creed Odyssey – Ubisoft Quebec / Ubisoft; Marvel's Spider-Man – Insomniac Games / Sony Interactive Entertainment; Red Dead Redemption 2 – Rockstar Games; Shadow of the Tomb Raider – Eidos Montréal / Square Enix
Best Role Playing Game	Best Fighting Game
**Monster Hunter: World – Capcom**‡; Dragon Quest XI – Square Enix; Ni no Kuni II: Revenant Kingdom – Level-5 / Bandai Namco Entertainment; Octopath Traveler – Square Enix Business Division 11, Acquire / Nintendo; Pillars of Eternity II: Deadfire – Obsidian Entertainment	**Dragon Ball FighterZ – Arc System Works / Bandai Namco Entertainment**‡; BlazBlue: Cross Tag Battle – Arc System Works; Soulcalibur VI – Bandai Namco Studios, Dimps / Bandai Namco Entertainment; Street Fighter V: Arcade Edition – Capcom
Best Family Game	Best Strategy Game
**Overcooked 2 – Ghost Town Games / Team17**‡; Mario Tennis Aces – Camelot Software Planning / Nintendo; Nintendo Labo – Nintendo; Starlink: Battle for Atlas – Ubisoft Toronto / Ubisoft; Super Mario Party – NDcube / Nintendo	**Into the Breach – Subset Games**‡; The Banner Saga 3 – Stoic / Versus Evil; BattleTech – Harebrained Schemes / Paradox Interactive; Frostpunk – 11 bit studios; Valkyria Chronicles 4 – Sega
Best Sports/Racing Game	Best Multiplayer Game
**Forza Horizon 4 – Playground Games / Microsoft Studios**‡; FIFA 19 – EA Vancouver / EA Sports; Mario Tennis Aces – Camelot Software Planning / Nintendo; NBA 2K19 – Visual Concepts / 2K Sports; Pro Evolution Soccer 2019 – PES Productions / Konami	**Fortnite – Epic Games**‡; Call of Duty: Black Ops 4 – Treyarch / Activision; Destiny 2: Forsaken – Bungie / Activision; Monster Hunter: World – Capcom; Sea of Thieves – Rare / Microsoft Studios
Best Student Game	Best Debut Indie Game
**Combat 2018 – Inland Norway University of Applied Sciences**‡; Dash Quasar – UC Santa Cruz; JERA – DigiPen Bilbao, Spain; LIFF – ISART Digital; RE: Charge – MIT	**The Messenger – Sabotage / Devolver Digital**‡; Donut County – Ben Esposito / Annapurna Interactive; Florence – Mountains / Annapurna Interactive; Moss – Polyarc Games; Yoku's Island Express – Villa Gorilla

==== Esports and creators ====
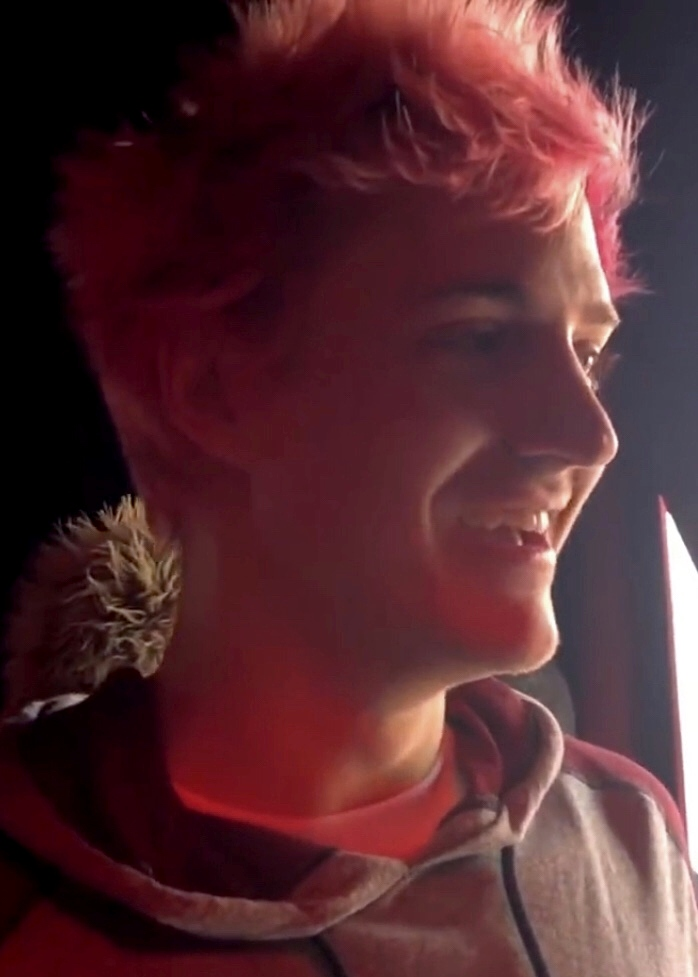
Ninja was awarded Content Creator of the Year.

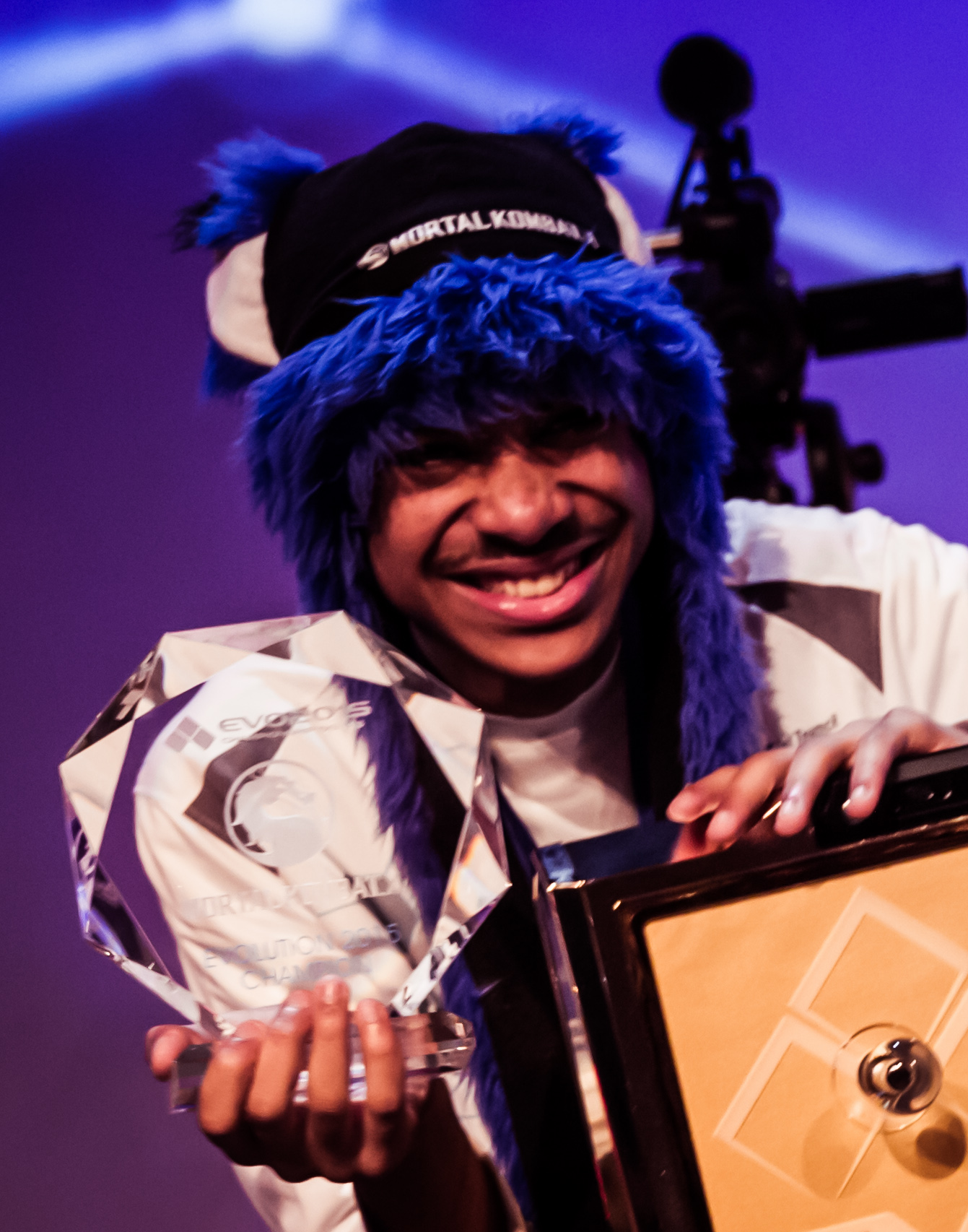
SonicFox won Best Esports Player.

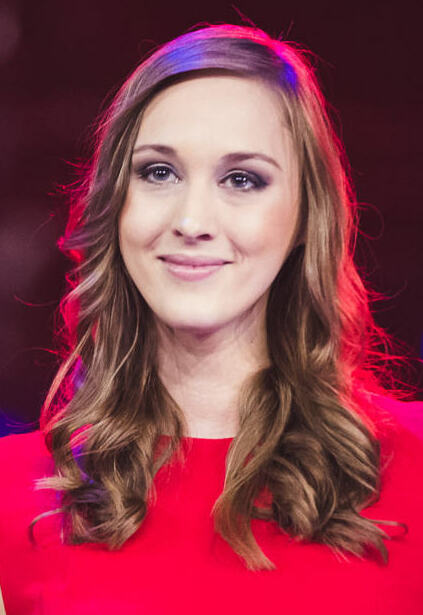
Sjokz won Best Esports Host.

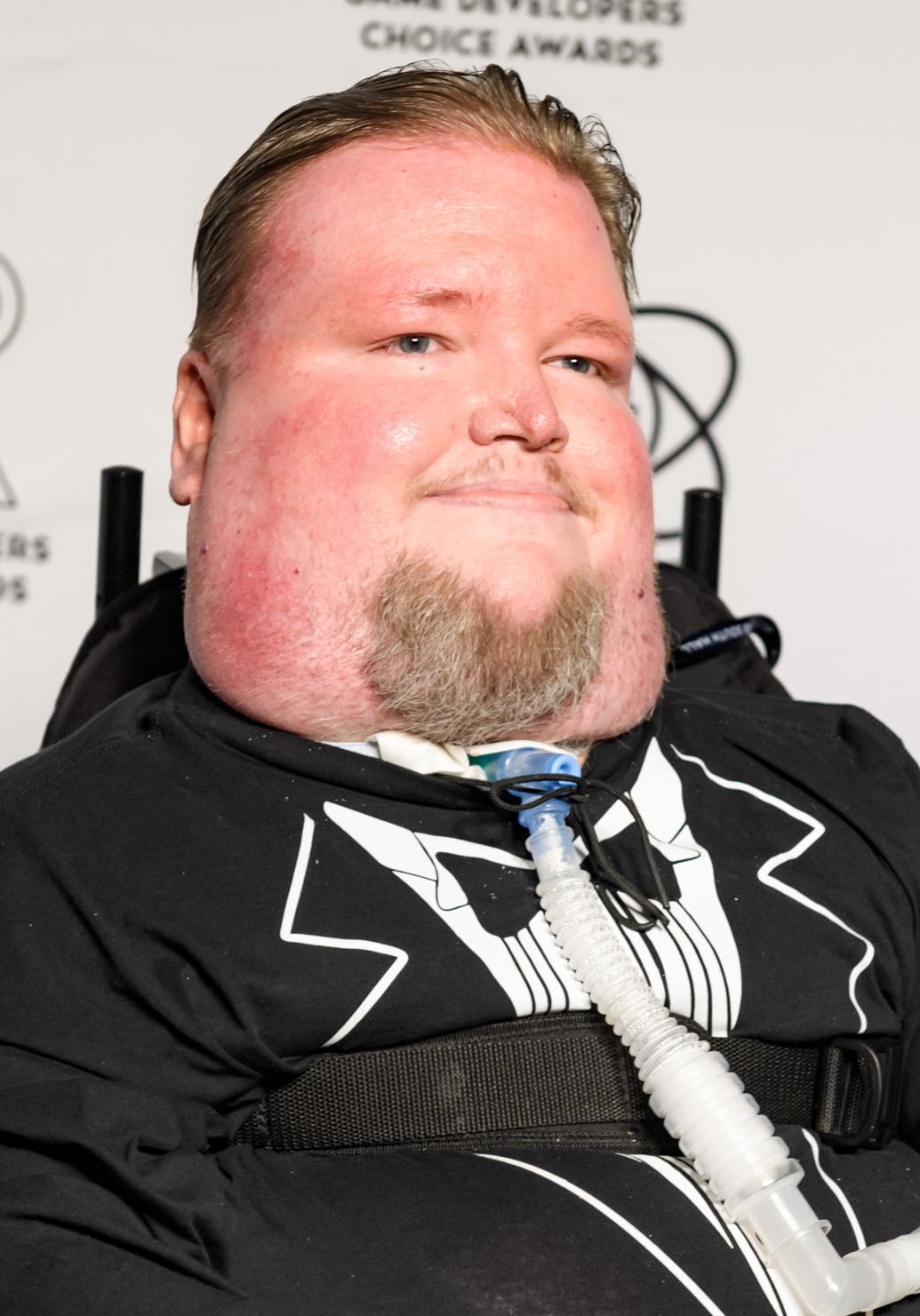
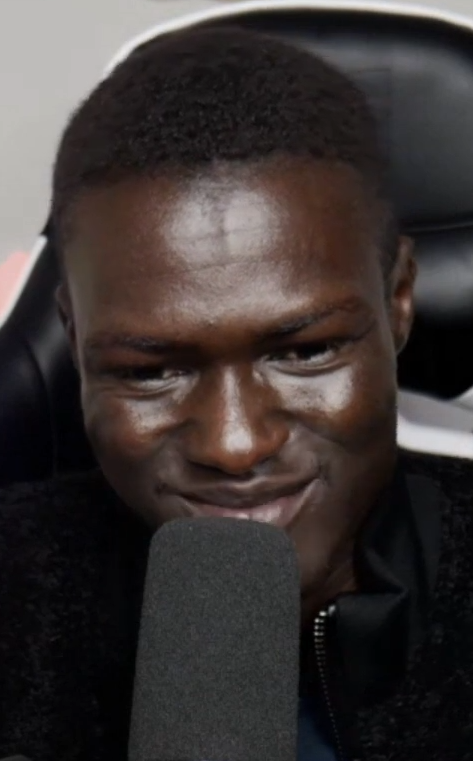
Steven Spohn (left) and Lual Mayen (right) were named Global Gaming Citizens, alongside Sadia Bashir.

Best Esports Game	Best Esports Player (Note: Presented by Omen by HP)
**Overwatch – Blizzard Entertainment**‡; Counter-Strike: Global Offensive – Valve; Dota 2 – Valve; Fortnite – Epic Games; League of Legends – Riot Games	**Dominique "SonicFox" McLean (Echo Fox)**‡; Sung-hygeon "JJoNak" Bang (New York Excelsior); Oleksandr "s1mple" Kostyliev (Natus Vincere); Hajime "Tokido" Taniguchi (Echo Fox); Jian "Uzi" Zi-Hao (Royal Never Give Up)
Best Esports Team	Best Esports Coach
**Cloud9 (League of Legends)**‡; Astralis (Counter-Strike: Global Offensive); Fnatic (League of Legends); London Spitfire (Overwatch League); OG (Dota 2)	**Bok "Reapered" Han-gyu (Cloud9)**‡; Christian "ppasarel" Banaseanu (OG); Dylan Falco (Fnatic); Jakob "YamatoCannon" Mebdi (Team Vitality); Janko "YNk" Paunovic (MiBR); Danny "zonic" Sorensen (Astralis)
Best Esports Event	Best Esports Host
**2018 League of Legends World Championship**‡; 2018 Overwatch League Grand Finals; ELEAGUE Major: Boston 2018; Evo 2018; The International 2018	**Eefje "Sjokz" Depoortere**‡; Anders Blume; Paul "Redeye" Chaloner; Alex "Goldenboy" Mendez; Alex "Machine" Richardson
Best Esports Moment	Content Creator of the Year
**Cloud9 comeback win in triple OT vs Faze (ELEAGUE Major: Boston 2018)**‡; G2 beating RNG (League of Legends World Championship); KT vs IG base race (League of Legends World Championship); OG's massive upset of LGD (The International 2018); SonicFox side switch against Go1 (Evo 2018)	**Ninja**‡; DrLupo; Pokimane; Willyrex

==== Honorary awards ====
Industry Icon Award	Global Gaming Citizens (Note: Presented in conjunction with Facebook Gaming)
Greg Thomas	Sadia Bashir; Steven Spohn; Lual Mayen

=== Games with multiple nominations and awards ===
==== Multiple nominations ====
God of War and Red Dead Redemption 2 both received eight nominations each, the most in the show's history at the time. Other games with multiple nominations included Marvel's Spider-Man with seven, and Assassin's Creed Odyssey, Celeste, and Fortnite with four each. Sony Interactive Entertainment had 20 total nominations, more than any other publisher, followed by Rockstar Games with eight and Square Enix and Ubisoft with seven each.

Games that received multiple nominations
Nominations	Game
8	God of War
8	Red Dead Redemption 2
7	Marvel's Spider-Man
4	Assassin's Creed Odyssey
4	Celeste
4	Fortnite
3	Call of Duty: Black Ops 4
3	Destiny 2
3	Detroit: Become Human
3	Florence
3	Monster Hunter: World
3	Octopath Traveler
2	Dead Cells
2	Donut County
2	Forza Horizon 4
2	Into the Breach
2	Life Is Strange 2
2	Mario Tennis Aces
2	The Messenger
2	Moss
2	Ni no Kuni II: Revenant Kingdom
2	Return of the Obra Dinn
2	Overwatch

Nominations by publisher
Nominations	Publisher
20	Sony Interactive Entertainment
8	Rockstar Games
7	Square Enix
7	Ubisoft
6	Activision
6	Nintendo
5	Annapurna Interactive
5	Bandai Namco Entertainment
5	Capcom
4	Epic Games
4	Maddy Makes Games
3	Devolver Digital
3	Microsoft Studios
2	3909 LLC
2	Arc System Works (Note: Arc System Works had an additional nomination as the developer of Dragon Ball FighterZ.)
2	Blizzard Entertainment
2	Electronic Arts
2	Motion Twin
2	Polyarc Games
2	Subset Games
2	Valve

==== Multiple awards ====
Red Dead Redemption 2 received the most awards with four wins, tying for the highest-awarded game in the show's history to date. God of War won three awards, while Celeste and Fortnite won two. Rockstar Games and Sony Interactive Entertainment were the most successful publishers, with four wins each, while Epic Games and Maddy Makes Games won two.

Games that received multiple wins
Awards	Game
4	Red Dead Redemption 2
3	God of War
2	Celeste
2	Fortnite

Wins by publisher
Awards	Publisher
4	Rockstar Games
4	Sony Interactive Entertainment
2	Epic Games
2	Maddy Makes Games

== Presenters and performers ==
=== Presenters ===
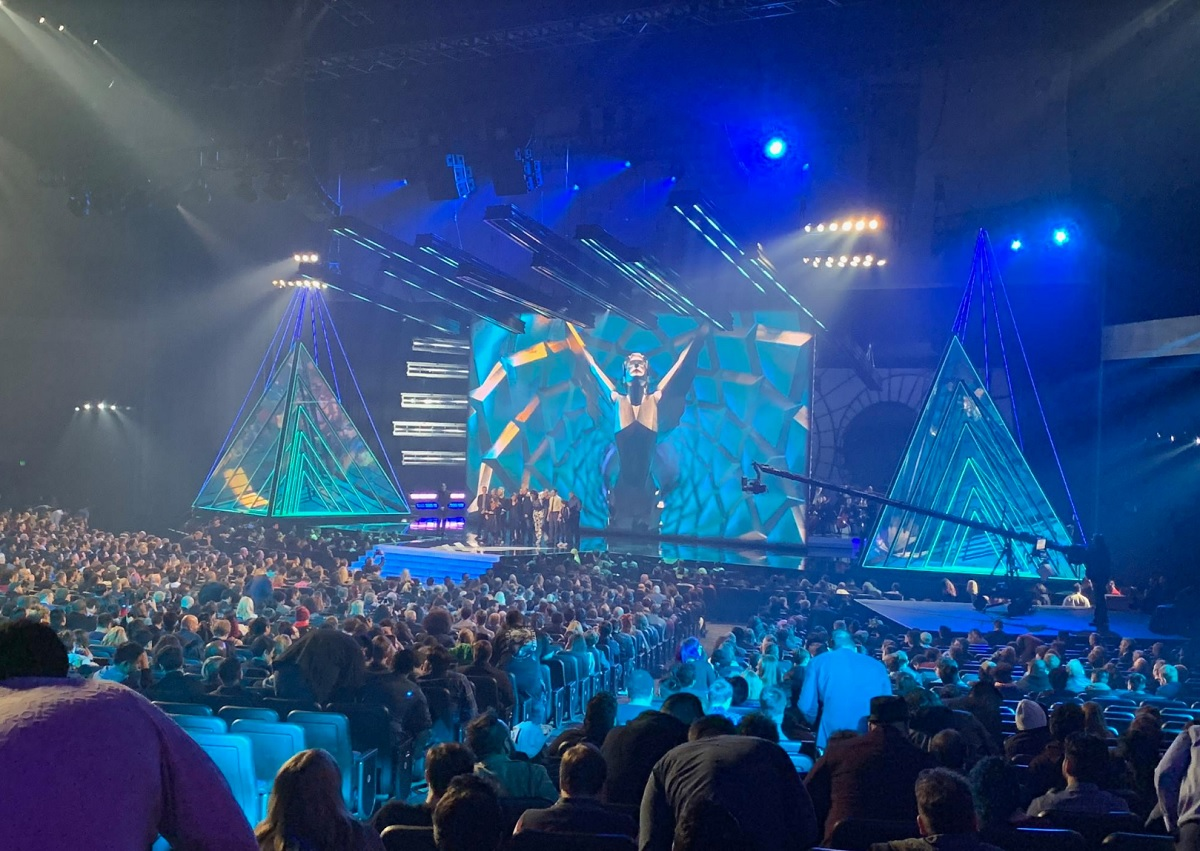
Santa Monica Studio on stage after winning Game of the Year for God of War.

The following individuals, listed in order of appearance, presented awards or introduced trailers. All other awards were presented by Keighley. Aisha Tyler was announced as a presenter but she was forced to drop out to film for Criminal Minds.

Name	Role	Ref.
Josef Fares	Presented the award for Best Action Game in the preshow	
Alex Hutchinson	Presented the reveal trailer for Journey to the Savage Planet in the preshow	
Reggie Fils-Aimé	Opened the show with a shared speech about unity in the industry	
Shawn Layden	Opened the show with a shared speech about unity in the industry	
Phil Spencer	Opened the show with a shared speech about unity in the industry	
Jacksepticeye	Presented the award for Best Narrative	
Pokimane	Presented the award for Best Narrative	
Jonah Hill	Presented the Industry Icon award	
Rosa Salazar	Presented the award for Best Performance	
Christoph Waltz	Presented the award for Best Performance	
Jean-Sebastien Decant	Presented the reveal trailer for Far Cry New Dawn	
Patrice Désilets	Presented the gameplay trailer for Ancestors: The Humankind Odyssey	
Josh Holmes	Presented the reveal trailer for Scavengers	
Brendon Urie	Presented the award for Best Score/Music	
Mathieu Coté	Presented the reveal trailer for Dead by Daylight: Darkness Among Us	
Casey Hudson	Presented the story for Anthem	
Crash Bandicoot (Note: Costume performer dressed as the fictional character)	Presented the reveal trailer for Crash Team Racing Nitro-Fueled	
Christopher Judge	Presented the award for Content Creator of the Year	
Sunny Suljic	Presented the award for Content Creator of the Year	
Leonard Boyarsky	Presented the reveal trailer for The Outer Worlds	
Tim Cain	Presented the reveal trailer for The Outer Worlds	
Jesse Houston	Presented the console announce trailer for Dauntless	
Joel McHale	Presented the award for Best Esports Athlete	
Dave Curd	Presented the Vikendi trailer for PlayerUnknown's Battlegrounds	
Brian Bell	Introduced the performers Ali and Casey Edwards	
Rivers Cuomo	Introduced the performers Ali and Casey Edwards	
Jesse Rapczak	Presented the reveal trailer for Atlas	
Jeremy Stieglitz	Presented the reveal trailer for Atlas	
Ninja	Presented the award for Best Independent Game	
Pepe the King Prawn	Presented the award for Best Independent Game	
Elaine Chase	Announced the esports program for Magic: The Gathering Arena	
The Duffer Brothers	Presented the reveal trailer for Stranger Things 3: The Game	
Ed Boon	Presented the reveal trailer for Mortal Kombat 11 and the award for Best Sports/Racing Game	
Phil Spencer	Presented the demo trailer for Devil May Cry 5	
Lena Raine	Presented the award for Best Game Direction	
Donald Mustard	Presented the Season 7 and "The Block" trailers for Fortnite	
Russo brothers	Presented the award for Best Ongoing Game	
Reggie Fils-Aimé	Presented the Joker trailer for Super Smash Bros. Ultimate	
Jeff Kaplan	Presented the award for Game of the Year	

=== Performers ===
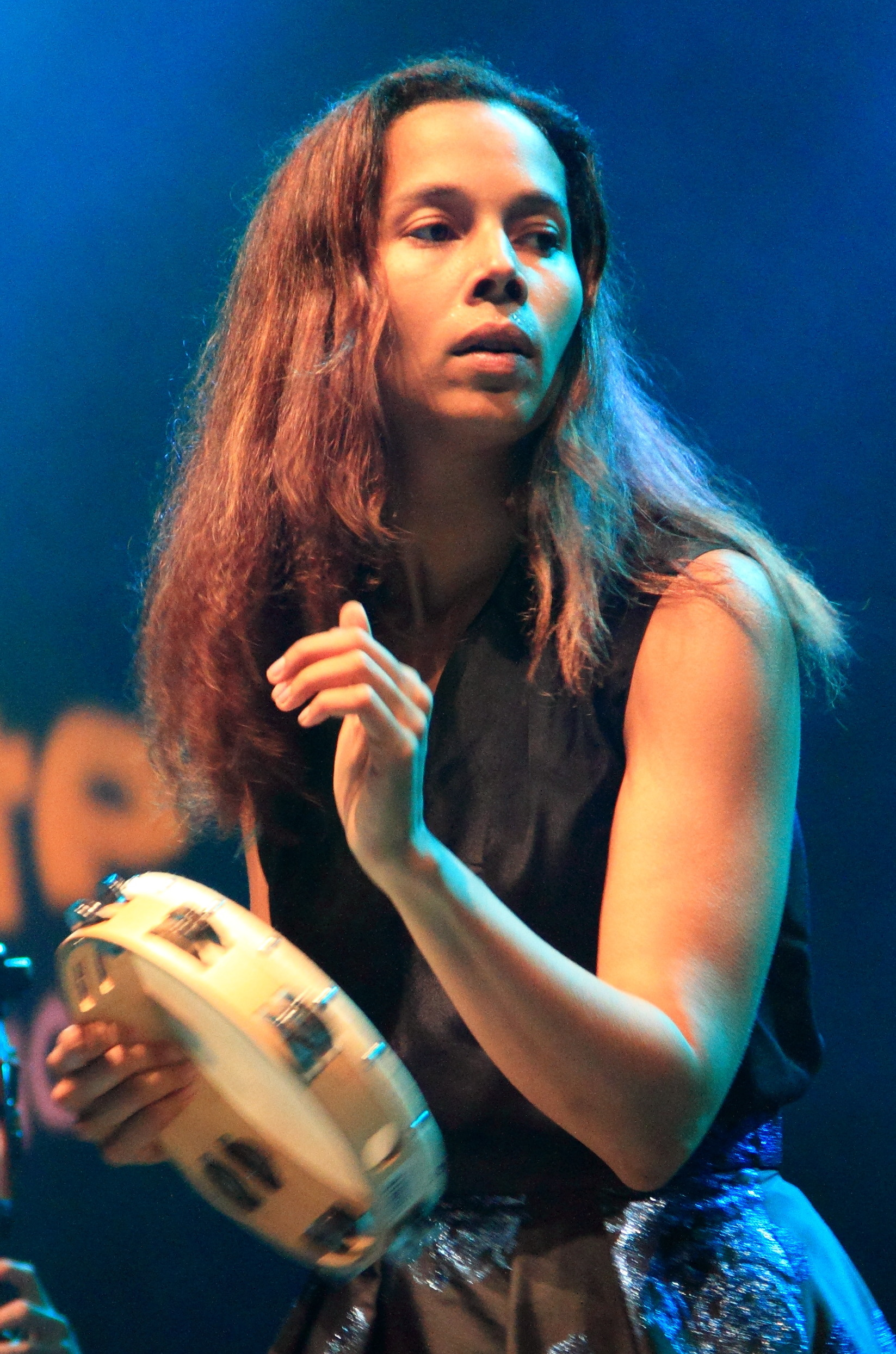
Rhiannon Giddens

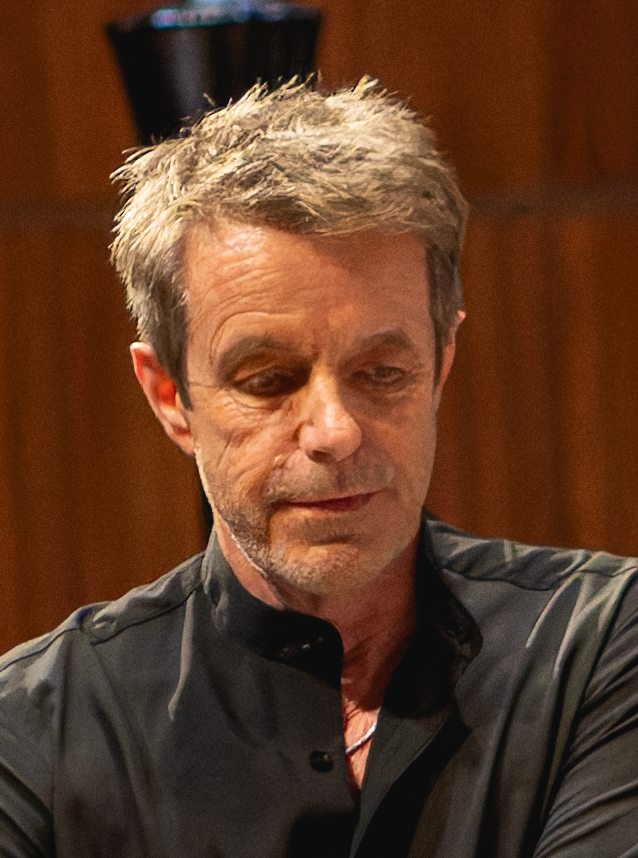
Harry Gregson-Williams

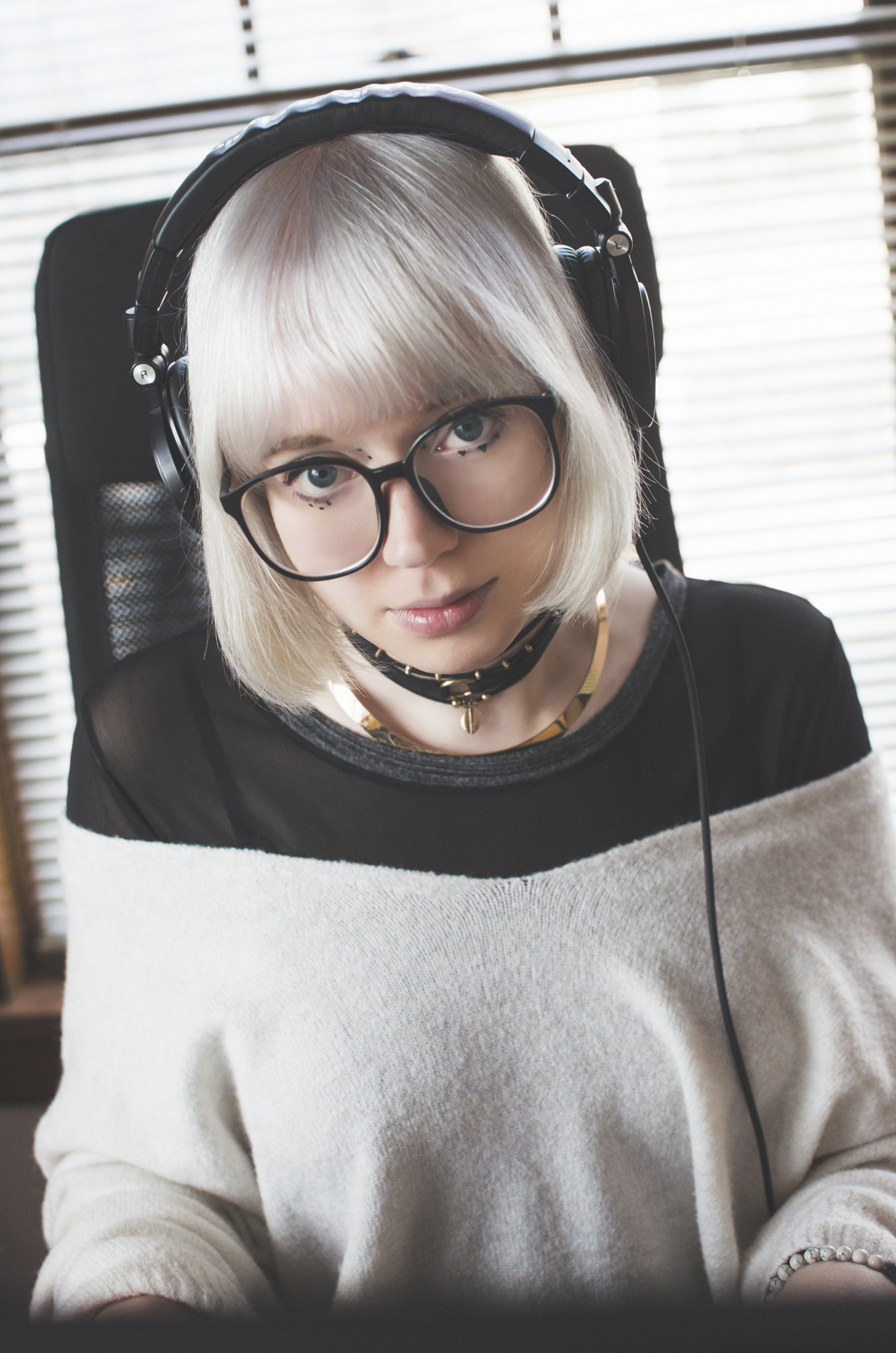
Lena Raine

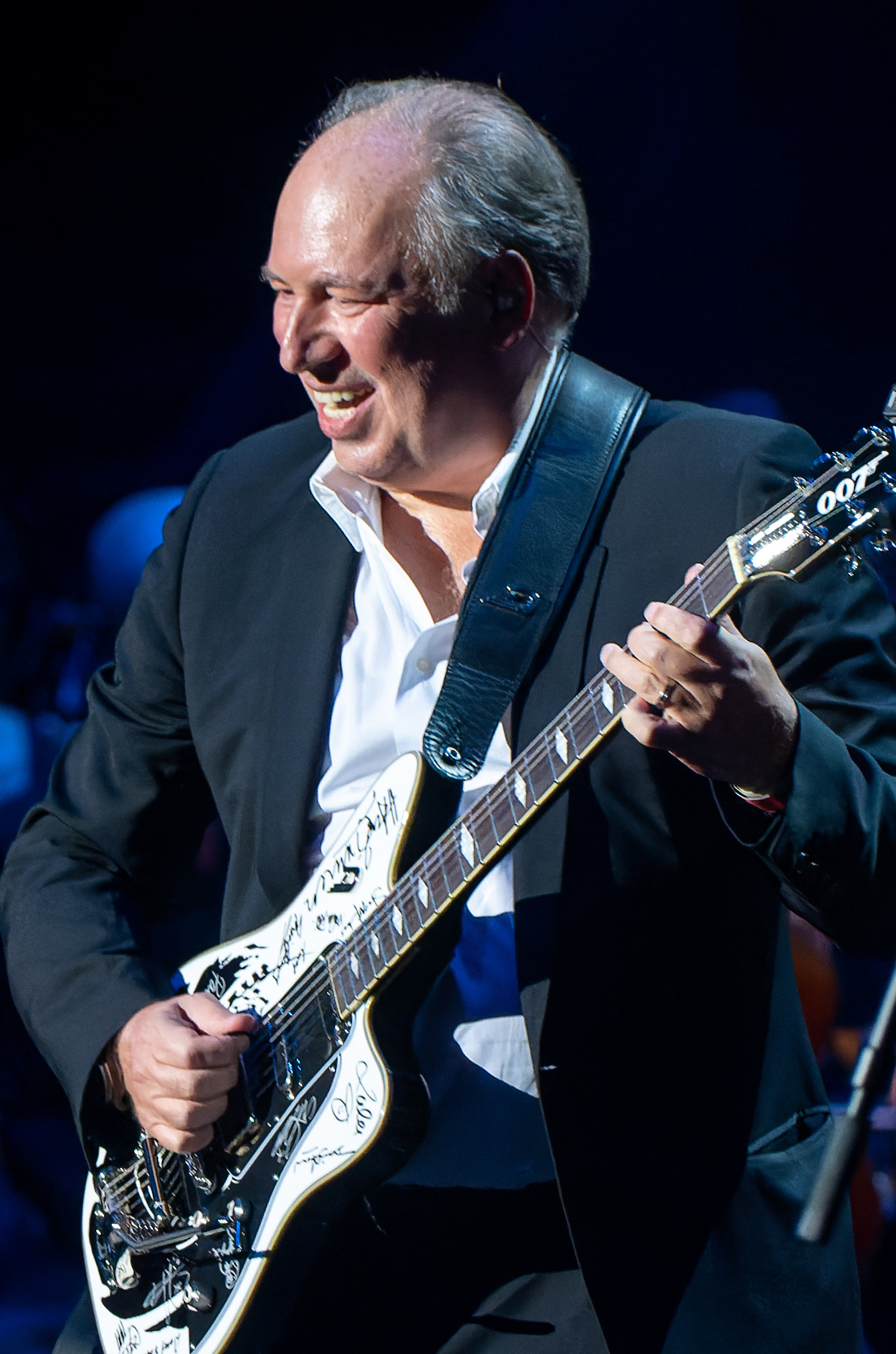
Hans Zimmer

Giddens, Gregson-Williams, Raine, and Zimmer performed music during the ceremony, the latter three alongside the Game Awards Orchestra.

The following individuals or groups performed musical numbers.

Name	Song	Game(s)
The Game Awards Orchestra (Note: Conducted by Lorne Balfe. Accompanied by Peter DiStefano on guitar and DeLaney Harter on violin.)	The Game Awards Theme Song	—N/a
Harry Gregson-Williams	The Game Awards Theme Song	—N/a
Lena Raine	The Game Awards Theme Song	—N/a
Sarah Schachner	The Game Awards Theme Song	—N/a
Hans Zimmer	The Game Awards Theme Song	—N/a
The Game Awards Orchestra	"Legion of Dawn"	Anthem
Sarah Schachner	"Legion of Dawn"	Anthem
Ali Edwards	"Devil Trigger"	Devil May Cry 5
Casey Edwards	"Devil Trigger"	Devil May Cry 5
Daniel Lanois and Rhiannon Giddens	"Mountain Hymn"	Red Dead Redemption 2
Daniel Lanois and Rhiannon Giddens	"Cruel World"	Red Dead Redemption 2
Daniel Lanois and Rhiannon Giddens	"Mountain Finale"	Red Dead Redemption 2
Daniel Lanois and Rhiannon Giddens	"Unshaken"	Red Dead Redemption 2
The Game Awards Orchestra	"Lifelight"	Super Smash Bros. Ultimate
The Game Awards Orchestra	Game of the Year medley (Note: The Game of the Year medley's songs included: "First Steps" from Celeste; "Legend of the Eagle Bearer" from Assassin's Creed Odyssey; "God of War" from God of War; "Proof of a Hero" from Monster Hunter World; "Outlaws From the West" from Red Dead Redemption 2; "Spider-Man" from Marvel's Spider-Man)	Assassin's Creed Odyssey
The Game Awards Orchestra	Game of the Year medley	Celeste (Note: Performed with Lena Raine)
The Game Awards Orchestra	Game of the Year medley	God of War
The Game Awards Orchestra	Game of the Year medley	Marvel's Spider-Man
The Game Awards Orchestra	Game of the Year medley	Monster Hunter: World
The Game Awards Orchestra	Game of the Year medley	Red Dead Redemption 2

== Reception ==
=== Nominees ===
VentureBeat's Dean Takahashi felt the nominations success of God of War and Red Dead Redemption 2 demonstrated "the power of long development cycles with huge teams"; the games took seven and eight years to develop, respectively. BBC's Louise Blain found the amount of single-player nominees "refreshing" following discussions of ongoing games being the future of the industry. Some journalists were pleasantly surprised by Celeste's Game of the Year nomination. Den of Geek's Matthew Byrd observed a lack of variety in the nominees but considered them all high quality; he described Best Independent Game as "a stacked category" though noted Celeste was guaranteed to win due to its Game of the Year nomination.

=== Ceremony ===
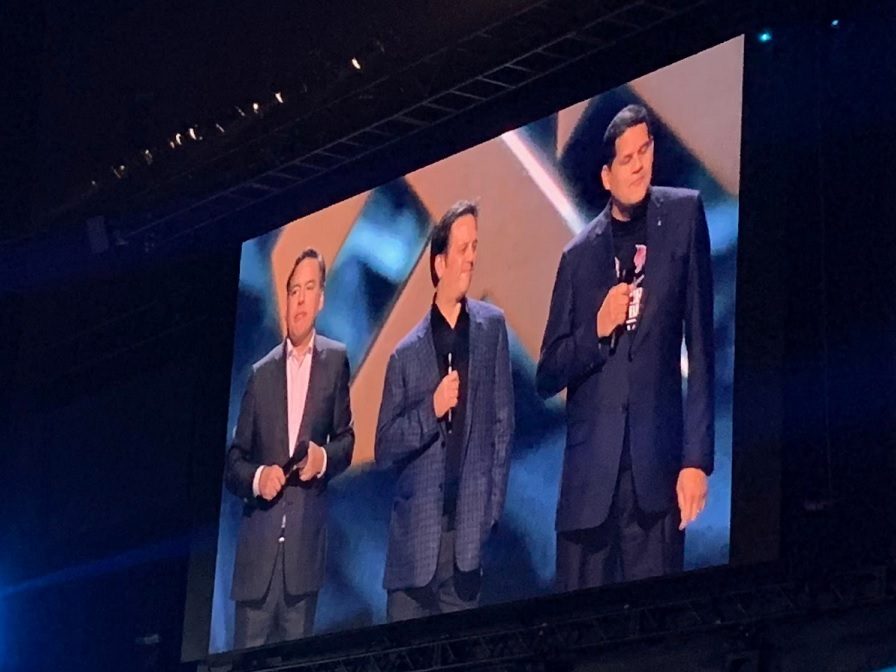
The show's opening speech by (left to right) PlayStation's Shawn Layden, Xbox's Phil Spencer, and Nintendo's Reggie Fils-Aimé was praised as a highlight of the ceremony.

Several journalists highlighted the shared speech of Fils-Aimé, Layden, and Spencer as a highlight of the ceremony; Destructoid's Chris Hinton wrote it "absolutely bolstered the image of The Game Awards". VentureBeat's Takahashi praised the show for its surprises and wrote it demonstrates "gaming's bright future". He was pleasantly surprised by God of War's Game of the Year win, though noted he personally voted for Red Dead Redemption 2, and said his favorite moment was Christopher Judge imitating his performance as Kratos on stage to Sunny Suljic, who portrayed Kratos's son Atreus. Push Square's Sammy Barker wrote the show was "very close" to hitting its ceiling and praised the blend of celebration and announcements.

Shacknews staff found the show an improvement over previous years, particularly in its presentation and professionalism, though God of War's win polarized the crew. Kotaku's Heather Alexandra found SonicFox's acceptance speech among the most heartfelt moments of the show. Destructoid's CJ Andriessen criticized the show's heavier focus on announcements than awards, noting trailers received more screen time than winners. The Verge's Megan Farokhmanesh highlighted the show's problematic winners, such as Ninja's use of racial expletives and refusal to stream with women and Red Dead Redemption 2's use of crunch practices.

=== Viewership ===
The Game Awards 2018 was the most-viewed ceremony to date. Over 26.2 million streams were used to view the show, an increase of 128 percent from the 2017 ceremony's 11.5 million. At its peak, the show had over four million concurrent viewers, including 1.13 million on Twitch. The stream on Twitter had 1.3 times as many unique viewers as the previous year. The show was the top worldwide trend on Twitter; the use of the hashtag #TheGameAwards increased 1.6 times over the previous show, and the overall conversation increased 1.9 times. On Weibo, the 310,000 unique posts related to the awards received more than 56 million views. Over 3,300 Twitch users co-streamed the show, an increase of 140 percent.
