= Studio Wildcard =

American video game developer

Wildcard Properties, LLC
- Trade name: Studio Wildcard
- Type: Subsidiary
- Industry: Video games
- Founded: October 2014; 12 years ago
- Founders: Doug Kennedy; Jesse Rapczak; Jeremy Stieglitz; Susan Browning Stieglitz
- Headquarters: Redmond, Washington, US
- Number of locations: 3 (2025)
- Key people: Doug Kennedy (CEO)
- Products: Ark: Survival Evolved; Ark: Survival Ascended
- Number of employees: 35 (2016)
- Parent: SDE Inc.
- Website: studiowildcard.com

Wildcard Properties, LLC (doing business as Studio Wildcard) is an American video game developer with offices in Redmond, Washington, and Gainesville, Florida. The company was founded in October 2014 by Doug Kennedy, Jesse Rapczak, Jeremy Stieglitz, and Susan Browning Stieglitz. Stieglitz had previously left his position at Trendy Entertainment in August 2014 under a one-year non-compete agreement. The company sued him and Studio Wildcard in December 2015 for breach of contract, among other allegations, and the parties settled in April 2016. Studio Wildcard's debut game, Ark: Survival Evolved, was released in August 2017. In 2018, it set up Grapeshot Games to develop Atlas. A sequel, Ark II, was announced in December 2020.

== History ==
Jeremy Stieglitz and Augi Lye founded the developer Trendy Entertainment in 2009. In September 2013, after being publicly accused of creating a hostile work environment, Stieglitz's role within the company was reduced to president of NomNom Games, a minor subsidiary of the studio. In April 2014, he notified the management of Trendy Entertainment and its primary investor, Insight Venture Partners, that he intended to leave the company because he could not trust or work with certain employees at the company. At the time, Stieglitz was subject to a non-compete agreement, barring him from competing with and hiring employees from Trendy Entertainment for three years. Pursuant to an agreement signed in July that year, Stieglitz was bound to Trendy Entertainment until August 15, 2014, with the length of his non-compete agreement in turn reduced to one year. Stieglitz consequently left the company that August, stating that he would take a break before re-entering the video game industry. According to Trendy Entertainment, Stieglitz had been secretly approaching the company's staff with the prospect of joining a new video game studio, so the company's lawyers reminded him of the non-compete agreement on August 18, 2014.

Stieglitz founded Studio Wildcard in October 2014. It was incorporated as a limited liability company under the jurisdiction of Florida, while offices were established in the Seattle area. Doug Kennedy, Jesse Rapczak, and Susan Browning Stieglitz (Stieglitz's wife) were co-founders of the company. Kennedy was appointed as Studio Wildcard's chief executive officer. Legally, Browning Stieglitz was listed as the company's manager under her maiden name, Susan Browning, while Stieglitz was not listed. In December 2015, Snail Ark Inc. (a California corporation and subsidiary of SDE Inc.) was merged into Studio Wildcard. Subsequently, three managers of the former Snail Ark Inc. became managers of Studio Wildcard, while Browning Stieglitz was removed as one. Studio Wildcard later identified SDE Inc. as its parent company. SDE Inc. has been described as an affiliate of Snail Games USA, the American branch of the Chinese video game company Snail Games.

During 2015, Trendy Entertainment and its lawyers repeatedly contacted Stieglitz in regard to his involvement with Studio Wildcard, including through a cease and desist letter sent in July that year. On December 18, 2015, Trendy Entertainment filed a lawsuit against him and Studio Wildcard at Florida's Eighth Circuit Civil Court in Alachua County. The company alleged that Stieglitz had violated the non-compete agreement by establishing Studio Wildcard, developing Ark: Survival Evolved, and hiring employees from Trendy Entertainment. At the time of the lawsuit, Studio Wildcard employed six former Trendy Entertainment staffers, including two key programmers whose departure was stated to have caused "substantial damages" for Trendy Entertainment. The lawsuit further alleged that Studio Wildcard's technology used for Ark appeared "indistinguishable" to Trendy Entertainment's PlayVerse technology, and that Studio Wildcard had hired the contractor Instinct Games away from Trendy Entertainment. It also claimed that listing Browning Stieglitz under her maiden name—as opposed to her married name, which had been used for her roles in Yum Cupcakery, Sarkara Sweets, and Ingenue Avenue—had been an effort to conceal Stieglitz's role within Studio Wildcard. Insight Venture Partners filed a parallel lawsuit on February 11, 2016.

Through the lawsuit, Trendy Entertainment sought for US$600 million in damages as well as a permanent injunction against Studio Wildcard releasing video games. In response to the allegations, Studio Wildcard's lawyers stated that the complaint read "more like a salacious tabloid story" than a statement of the facts that would entitle Trendy Entertainment to relief under the Florida Rules of Civil Procedure, and that many of the allegations were "disparaging and included simply to be provocative. They are irrelevant, immaterial, impertinent, and scandalous." The defense later argued that, because the non-compete clause had expired in August 2015, Trendy Entertainment had only filed the lawsuit after Studio Wildcard's December 2015 acquisition to profit from the success of Ark. They also claimed that the game could not have competed with Trendy Entertainment's products, as Ark was rated for mature audiences, was more expensive, and required better hardware to function. Furthermore, they stated that Studio Wildcard had not poached any employees, rather that some had left Trendy Entertainment prior to joining Studio Wildcard, were hired by individual founders (excluding Stieglitz), or decided to leave Trendy Entertainment on their own after learning of Studio Wildcard. Stieglitz separately stated that he had kept his involvement with Studio Wildcard secret to avoid comments from Internet trolls. The parties ultimately settled for $40 million on April 13, 2016.

By February 2016, Studio Wildcard employed 60 people at its office in Bellevue, Washington. By May, there were 25 employees in Seattle and 10 in Gainesville, Florida. Ark, which had been in early access since 2015, was released in August 2017. For PixArk, a spin-off developed by Snail Games and announced in 2018, Studio Wildcard provided "design and technical input". At The Game Awards 2018, Studio Wildcard announced Atlas, a massively multiplayer online game featuring pirates. To develop Atlas, Studio Wildcard had set up a sister studio, Grapeshot Games, and run a one-year-long recruitment phase to ensure that the development of the game was not coming at the expense of Ark. A sequel to Ark, Ark II, was announced at The Game Awards 2020. Vin Diesel, who stars in Ark II, joined Studio Wildcard as "president of creative convergence" (executive producer) to oversee the game. In October 2023, Studio Wildcard was said to facilitate the re-release of massive multiplayer online game Myth of Empires by Angela Game.

== Games developed ==
Year	Title	Platform(s)
2017	Ark: Survival Evolved	Android, iOS, Linux, macOS, Nintendo Switch, PlayStation 4, PlayStation 5, Stadia, Windows, Xbox One, Xbox Series X/S
2017	Ark: Survival of the Fittest	PlayStation 5, Windows, Xbox Series X/S
2023	Ark: Survival Ascended	PlayStation 5, Windows, Xbox Series X/S
2028	Ark 2	TBA
