= Sjokz =

Belgian esports presenter, journalist and player

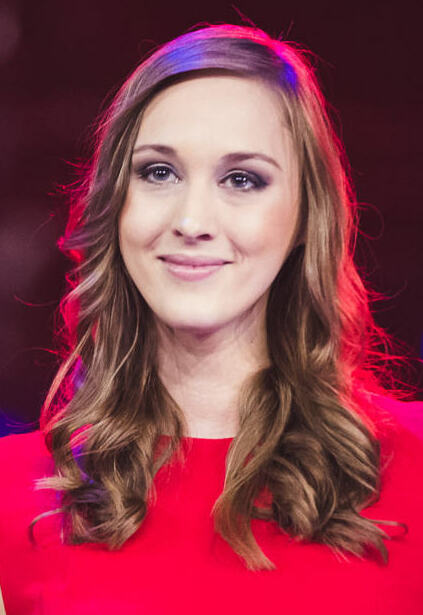
- Sjokz in 2015
- Born: Eefje Depoortere; 16 June 1987 (age 39); Bruges, Belgium
- Education: Ghent University
- Occupations: Television presenter, reporter, and esports player
- Employer(s): Riot Games; Electronic Sports League
- Television: League of Legends European Championship

Eefje Depoortere (Dutch pronunciation: [ˈeːfjə dəˈpoːrtərə]; born 16 June 1987), known professionally as Sjokz (English: /ʃɒks/ "shocks", Dutch: [ɕɔks]), is a Belgian television presenter, reporter, and esports player who has hosted the League of Legends European Championship. She has also hosted multiple League of Legends World Championships.

== Early life ==
Depoortere grew up in Belgium as an only child. She completed her Master's degree in history (2009), sports journalism (2010) and a teaching degree (2011) from Ghent University.

== Career ==
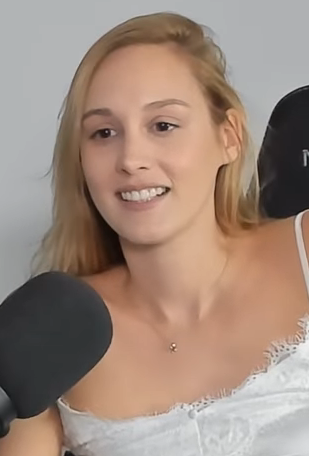
Sjokz during a 2018 interview with G2 Esports owner Ocelote

Depoortere was formerly a competitive Unreal Tournament '99 player and competed in several LANs. The name "Sjokz" is a phonetic spelling of "shocks" in Dutch, and derives from her use of the Shock Rifle in Unreal Tournament.

Depoortere began working as a freelance journalist producing esports-related content for SK Gaming and ESFi World.

Depoortere was crowned as the winner of the 2009 Aardbeienprinses van Beervelde pageant and was the third-place finalist in the 2011 Miss Style Belgium pageant.

It was due to esports journalist Travis Gafford's YouTube show Whose League is it Anyway? that Depoortere became known in the community. Due to her popularity on WLIA she was later hired to be the host of the European League of Legends Championship Series. She has often thanked Gafford for helping her establish herself in esports. Depoortere is also known for the YouTube show Summoner Recap on the SK Gaming's YouTube channel, which was one of the first League of Legends shows. In 2013, Depoortere hosted the World Championship in Staples Center in Los Angeles, California. She has also hosted the 2015 and 2019 World Championship, both held in Europe, and the 2020 World Championship held in China, but cast remotely in Berlin due to the COVID-19 Pandemic. Depoortere won the "Best Esports Host" award at The Game Awards 2018, The Game Awards 2019, and The Game Awards 2020.

== Awards and nominations ==
Year	Ceremony	Category	Result	Ref.
2017	Esports Industry Awards	Esports Personality of the Year	Won	
2018	The Game Awards	Best Esports Host	Won	
2019	The Game Awards	Best Esports Host	Won	
2020	The Game Awards	Best Esports Host	Won	
2020	Esports Awards	Esports Host of the Year	Won	
2020	Esports Awards	Esports Personality of the Year	Nominated	
2024	Sport Emmy	Outstanding esports championship coverage	Won	
2025	Esports Awards	Esports On-Air Talent of the Decade	Won	
