= Ark: Survival Evolved =

2017 video game

- Developer: Studio Wildcard (Note: Additional work by Instinct Games, Efecto Studios, and Virtual Basement)
- Publisher: Studio Wildcard
- Directors: Jesse Rapczak; Jeremy Stieglitz
- Producers: Navin Supphapholsiri; Dave Loyd
- Designers: Craig Brown; Kayd Hendricks
- Composer: Gareth Coker
- Engine: Unreal Engine 4
- Platforms: Linux; macOS; PlayStation 4; Windows; Xbox One; Android; iOS; Nintendo Switch; Stadia
- Release: Linux, macOS, PS4, Windows, Xbox One; August 29, 2017; Android, iOS; June 14, 2018; Nintendo Switch; November 30, 2018 (Note: The original 2018 Nintendo Switch version was replaced by a new port by Grove Street Games on November 1, 2022.); Stadia; September 1, 2021
- Genres: MMORPG, Action-adventure, survival
- Modes: Single-player, multiplayer

Ark: Survival Evolved (stylized as ARK) is a 2017 action-adventure survival video game developed by Studio Wildcard. In the game, players must survive being stranded on one of several maps filled with roaming dinosaurs, fictional fantasy monsters, and other prehistoric animals, natural hazards, and potentially hostile human players.

The game is played from either a third-person or first-person perspective and its open world is navigated by foot or by riding a prehistoric animal. Players can use firearms and improvised weapons to defend against hostile humans and creatures, with the ability to build bases as a defense on the ground and on some creatures. The game has both single-player and multiplayer options. Multiplayer allows the option to form tribes of players in a server. The max number of tribe mates varies from each server. In this mode, all tamed dinosaurs and building structures are usually shared between the members. There is a PvE mode where players cannot fight each other unless a specific war event agreed upon by both parties is triggered.

Development began in October 2014, and the game entered early access for PC in the middle of 2015. The development team conducted research into the physical appearance of the animals but took a creative license for gameplay purposes. Instinct Games, Effecto Studios, and Virtual Basement were hired to facilitate the game's development. The game was officially released in August 2017 for Linux, macOS, PlayStation 4, Windows, and Xbox One, with versions for Android, iOS, and Nintendo Switch in 2018, a version for Stadia in 2021, and a second, separate Nintendo Switch version in 2022.

Ark: Survival Evolved received generally mixed reviews, with criticism for its level of difficulty, repetitive gameplay design, and "bloated" level of content. The initial Nintendo Switch version was panned for its graphics and performance issues. Several expansions to the game have been released as downloadable content.

Ark: Survival Evolved spawned two spin-off games in partnership with Snail Games—virtual reality game Ark Park and sandbox survival game PixArk. A sequel, Ark 2, was announced in December 2020. In 2023, a remaster, Ark: Survival Ascended, was released in early access for Windows, PlayStation 5, and Xbox Series X/S.

== Gameplay ==
Ark: Survival Evolved is an action-adventure survival game set in an open world environment with a dynamic day-night cycle and played either from a third-person or first-person perspective. To survive, players must establish a base, with a fire and weapons; additional activities, such as taming and feeding dinosaurs, require more resources. The game's world, known as the "Ark", is approximately 48 km^{2} (19 sq mi) in size: there is approximately 36 km^{2} (14 sq mi) of land with 12 km^{2} (4.6 sq mi) of ocean.

There are currently 194 creatures that populate the world of Ark. In the early versions of the game, nearly all creatures were real dinosaurs and other prehistoric creatures, but as the storyline progressed, mythical creatures such as the wyvern, griffin, golem, and phoenix were added. As expansions were released, completely original creatures, such as the Karkinos and the Velonasaur, also made their way into the game, as well as original robotic creatures such as the Enforcer and Scout.

One of the primary game mechanics of the game is taming creatures. The majority of creatures can be tamed by the player, though some such as Meganeura, Titanomyrma, or Cnidaria cannot. The taming method varies from creature to creature. Most creatures are a "knock out" tame, meaning the players must knock the creature out using tranquilizers or by using blunt weapons, such as a club. Oftentimes players will need to keep the dinosaur sedated for the duration of the tame. Some dinosaurs take longer than others to tame, therefore require more narcotics. Once knocked out, the player must feed the creature their preferred food, such as berries for herbivores or meat for carnivores. Some creatures, such as Moschops, can also be tamed passively by approaching them and giving them food. Certain other creatures, such as the Carcharodontosaurus, Reaper, and Fjordhawk must be tamed via mini-games that do not involve sedation or passive feeding. Once a creature is tamed, it will follow the commands of the player who tamed them. Many creatures can be used as a means of transportation and therefore allow the player to traverse the map easily. When riding atop certain creatures, players may still be able to use weapons. They can also be used to carry items, and players can issue a wide range of offensive and defensive commands to them. Some of the larger creatures, such as a brontosaurus or mosasaurus, can have a building platform placed on their back, giving players a small mobile base. The game also features various other non-dinosaur animals, such as the dodo, saber-toothed tiger, woolly mammoth, Meganeura, ichthyosaur, and Doedicurus. Every creature in the game lives in its own ecosystems within defined predator hierarchies. Many fictional creatures also exist on the map, including griffins, wyverns, and unicorns.

Players must keep track of various meters, such as health, stamina, oxygen, hunger, thirst, and "weight", or how much they can carry. Should players take damage, their health meter will gradually regenerate if they have consumed the necessary food, or if they craft items that regenerate the health meter at a faster pace. Otherwise, a player's health meter will gradually regenerate slowly over time. Players can gain experience through harvesting materials, crafting, killing, or discovering explorer notes. Once the player has obtained enough experience, they will gain a level point, which can be spent improving one of the player's stats, which include max health, max stamina, max oxygen, max food meter, max water meter, max carry weight, melee damage, movement speed, and crafting skill. As of April 2023, the maximum player level is 105, an additional 75 levels to be gained by defeating end-game bosses (Overseer, Manticore, Rockwell, Corrupted Master Controller, and Rockwell Prime), 5 acquired by leveling up a chibi (cosmetic pet obtained through an in-game event or the HLN-A hexagon exchange in the Genesis DLCs), and 10 extra levels through obtaining all of the explorer notes throughout the base game and all the DLC and 10 extra levels by getting all the runes found on the custom ark Fjordur. Tamed creatures can also gain experience and level points, which can be spent on similar stats. Creatures spawn into the game at levels ranging from 1 to 150, and, when tamed, can gain up to 75 more levels by gaining experience. There are also dinosaurs that can be tamed at a higher level, the tek dinosaurs. These spawn at a maximum level of 180. There are specific varieties of creatures, for instance, the Rock Drake, or the Wyvern variants, which are able to spawn up to level 190, but they are untameable in the wild, and instead must be hatched from their respective egg.

Players can build structures throughout the world. To build a base, players must acquire structure components—such as floors, doors, and windows built with the resources littered throughout the world—which are earned as they progress and gain levels, then collect the necessary materials to make them. These components can then be crafted and placed in the world. Players can create any structure, as long as they have the logistics and resources; the structural integrity of the building is compromised when the pillars and foundations are destroyed. Structures can be built from various tiers of materials, with better tiers providing more protection, but costing more resources to create. Players start out by creating thatch structures, then moving on to wood, stone, metal, and finally tek, a futuristic and late-game material. There are also glass structures that can be used to gain a greenhouse effect on plants grown inside. Adobe structures block heat from outside for an ideal temperature in the building. Players can also craft items in the game, such as weapons, by collecting the resources and technology required for crafting. In addition, players can craft and attach accessories to their weapons, such as a scope or flashlight for a pistol or assault rifle.

== Development ==
Preliminary work on Ark: Survival Evolved began in October 2014. Studio Wildcard, the Seattle-based team behind the game, co-opted Egypt-based developer Instinct Games to facilitate development; Effecto Studios and Virtual Basement later assisted development. When researching for information about the game's prehistoric species, the development team read "general audience books" and online articles, and sought assistance from friends who studied in the fields in biological sciences. When creating the species and world, the team took creative license for gameplay purposes, although there is an in-game reason that the species have diverged from their historical counterparts. Many of the development team members were inspired by dinosaur films such as Jurassic Park and The Land Before Time.

The team added features to the game that would appeal to all players, as opposed to specific players of the survival genre, such as the ability to simply explore the island and compete against large bosses, as a reward for uncovering secrets of the island. They also added an end-game for players to strive towards, as they felt that most survival games lack a final goal. They wanted to "provide a depth and scope that allows for the world to not just be a means to an end [...] but also a place to explore", said creative director Jesse Rapczak.

The game, powered by Unreal Engine 4, contains "tens of thousands" of artificial intelligence entities, according to Rapczak. It also features support for virtual reality (VR) gameplay; Rapczak, who has almost three years of experience with head-mounted displays, described the game as being designed with VR in mind from the beginning.

The game was initially released through Steam Early Access for Microsoft Windows on June 2, 2015, shortly before the theatrical release of Jurassic World later that month. Rapczak said that the game's release was scheduled to take advantage of the "dino fever" that was present with the film's imminent release. The game subsequently received an Early Access release for Linux and OS X on July 1, 2015, and through the Xbox Game Preview Program for Xbox One on December 16, 2015; Initially Sony was not going to allow a PlayStation 4 release due to the lack of any type of early access program on the console, however a PS4 version was eventually released on December 6, 2016. The final game launched on August 29, 2017, for Microsoft Windows, PlayStation 4, and Xbox One; it was originally intended for release in June 2016, but was delayed in April. The game launched with support for Oculus Rift and PlayStation VR, and the Xbox One version was released via the ID@Xbox program. The standard version was released alongside an "Explorer's Edition", which included a season pass with three expansions, and the "Collector's Edition", which included a season pass as well as, a necklace, a map, a notebook, a development team poster, a wooden chest packaging, and the game's official soundtrack. Android and iOS versions were released on June 14, 2018, and a Nintendo Switch version was released on November 30, 2018. A Stadia version was announced by Google in October 2020, originally scheduled for release in early 2021; it was released on September 1. An enhanced version of the game was accessible on Xbox Series X and Series S, featuring increased details, resolution, and draw distance. Following the poor reception of the original Nintendo Switch release, Ark: Ultimate Survivor Edition was announced as a new port rebuilt from the ground up, developed by Grove Street Games. It was initially planned for release in September 2022, but was delayed to November 1, 2022. A free upgrade was available for existing owners of the Nintendo Switch version.

On April 1, 2023, Studio Wildcard announced a remaster titled Survival Ascended to be released in August 2023, however this release window was then delayed until October 2023. Survival Evolved's official servers were set to be shut down at the same time, with the shutdown date being delayed until September 30, 2023, when Survival Ascended's release window was pushed back. Unlike previously stated by the studio co-founder, the remaster would not be a free upgrade. Survival Ascended was eventually released in early access for Windows on October 25, 2023, Xbox Series X/S on November 21, 2023, and PlayStation 5 on November 30, 2023.

=== Game modes ===
On March 16, 2016, the Survival of the Fittest game mode was released in early access as a free standalone game with no microtransactions; it was scheduled to fully launch in mid 2016, but was eventually merged back to the main game as the development team did not wish to monetize on its release, and wanted to ensure that modders can apply the development kit of Survival Evolved to create mods for Survival of the Fittest. There were various esports tournaments of the game mode, with a prize pool of US$50,000. Players who played Survival of the Fittest before it was merged back into the main game can continue to play the game without paying an extra cost, while new players must pay before getting access to it. It was available for every player who purchases the main game.

On March 25, 2019, game developers announced a new mode of gameplay: Classic PVP. The new game mode was made available on PC April 2, 2019. The update aims to revert the PVP meta back to the younger days of Ark via clustered servers with limitations such as: no official tribe alliances, limits to tribe size, lack of evolution events, un-tame-able Tek dinos, no access to Aberration and Extinction content, no Tek Engrams and reduced scaling of weapon damage. In late December 2022, a new version of Survival of the Fittest was released for PC. This later came to consoles in February. It is just like its 2016 predecessor, except for being remastered. Survival of the Fittest was also added to Xbox and PC in January 2023.

=== Expansions ===
On September 1, 2016, Studio Wildcard released the paid downloadable content (DLC) Scorched Earth. The expansion includes a new, desert map as well as several desert-themed resources and items. It also features new creatures, some of which are fictional, like the Wyvern and the Rock Elemental (based on the Golem). Some of the new creatures are not tameable, such as the Jug Bug, a fictional grasshopper-like insect equipped with a fluid-storing pouch on its back that stores water or oil. Scorched Earth has three unique weather patterns: Sandstorms radically reduce visibility and drain stamina; Superheat drains your water at a much faster rate than normal heat and induces heat stroke fairly quickly; while electrical storms temporarily shut down electrical devices and prevent firearms (and Tek Saddles) from firing.

The release of paid DLC for a game still in early access caused a negative reaction among players of the game, resulting in many negative reviews on Steam right after the expansion launch.

On December 12, 2017, the paid DLC Aberration was released, adding a new underground/alien-themed map and 15 new alien/underground themed creatures, such as a feathered dragon like creature known as a Rock Drake, which is capable of turning itself and its rider invisible. The Reaper, a xenomorph like creature with acidic abilities and "chest buster" like a reproductive cycle. The Ravager, a hairless canine predator that is capable of climbing up zip lines and vines. And the Nameless, chupacabra like creatures that are not tameable but act as enemies. The Nameless are hard to kill but they have some weaknesses, a weapon known as a "Charge Lantern" which can fend them off and "Light Pets" shoulder-mounted creatures that weaken the Nameless. New items are also added, such as climbing hooks and glider suits to navigate the hostile terrain. The largest map in terms of playable area, Aberration also allowed players to continue the story line of Ark and discover more of the truth about the Ark worlds.

On November 6, 2018, the third paid DLC expansion, Extinction was published by Snail Games USA. The expansion takes place on a future, dystopian Earth that has been corrupted by "Element"; various creatures located in 'wasteland zones' have been infected by this Element and would attack the player regardless of their normal behavior. The DLC introduced a new mechanic to the game: PVE events in which the player must defend either orbital supply drops from space or Element mineral veins for loot, resources, and element in all forms respectively. New creatures are also introduced, both organic and technological, such as the Gasbags; an evolved tardigrade that can inflate itself and blast gas, or take flight. The Enforcer; a robotic lizard that is capable of teleportation and dealing 4x damage to corrupted creatures. The final bosses of Extinction are called "Titans", powerful, giant, fictional creatures that are several magnitudes larger than any other creature in the game, and that can either be killed or temporarily tamed.

On February 25, 2020, the fourth paid DLC expansion, Genesis Part 1 was published by Snail Games USA. This expansion takes place in a simulation allowing the player to travel to 5 mini maps. Each mini map is a different biome. The different biomes include an alien bog, a large frigid arctic landscape, a very large ocean biome, a large volcanic hellscape, home to an active volcano, and the high orbit of outer space itself with low gravity. The new expansion adds new resources, items, and 5 new tameable creatures. This includes creatures such as the Magmasaur, a bearded dragon fused with magma that can use fire-based attacks, as well as the Ferox, a four-armed, lemur-like creature that transforms into a larger, more aggressive version of itself (similar to a werewolf). During Genesis Part 1, players discover the story with a new AI like companion, HLN-A (Helena). The Genesis DLC adds new missions for players across the simulations that grants graded loots.

The fifth and final paid DLC expansion, Genesis Part 2 was teased on November 7, 2020. It was released on June 3, 2021.

The map is set aboard the massive Genesis-Ship, a colony ship that is traveling through deep space looking for a new habitable planet for humanity. The ship has two rings; on the right side is a regular ring filled with plateaus, mountains, rivers, and waterfalls, providing all necessary resources needed for survival. The left side is a corrupted ring that is an aberrant and twisted alien like-region. The expansion features six new tameable creatures, such as the Shadowmane, a lion/lionfish hybrid that can teleport and can turn itself invisible. The Noglin, a small, alien like-creature that has a split jaw that is capable of controlling the minds of survivors and other creatures. And the Stryder, is a robotic hoofed animal that has many attachments that can be used for harvesting or for combat. New missions, weapons, and structures also appear.

Unlike other maps, Genesis: Part 2 is more story-oriented. It follows the player and HLN-A (voiced by Madeleine Madden) protecting the Genesis ship from Sir Edmund Rockwell (voiced by David Tennant), a mutated survivor who is trying to take over the colony ship for his own intentions.

Following the release of Genesis: Part 2, a remaster Ark: Survival Evolved, titled Ark: Survival Ascended was released on 25 October for PC and later was released on 21 November for Xbox Series X/S and on 30 November for PlayStation 5. This expansion is supposed to continue on Ark: Survival Evolved's story.

== Reception ==
Reception

Aggregate score
Aggregator	Score
Metacritic	PC: 70/100; PS4: 69/100; XONE: 69/100; NS: 29/100

Review scores
Publication	Score
Destructoid	7/10
GameSpot	6/10
IGN	7.7/10
PC Gamer (US)	72/100

Ark: Survival Evolved received "mixed or average" reviews for the Windows, PlayStation 4, and Xbox One versions, while the Switch version received "generally unfavorable" reviews, according to review aggregator website Metacritic.

TJ Hafer's 7.7/10 review on IGN stated that "When I'm having a good time in Ark, I'm having a really good time. The problem is that those moments are usually one part to every nine parts menial grinding and crafting – especially at the later tech tiers. Having to repeat so much work after failing an attempt at a boss feels far too punishing, and some really dumb dinosaurs can take a lot of the challenge and sense of danger out of the many primal locations. Even with all of those quirks, however, I'm still hungry to play more after the 60 hours I've spent so far. There aren't a lot of survival games that have legitimately held my attention that long."

GameSpot gave the game a 6/10, saying: "This outstanding sense of place and mood is offset by the sheer difficulty of everything that you have to do, the spectacular amounts of time necessary to experience even a tenth of what the game has to offer, and the randomness of death constantly destroying everything that you have built." Ian Birnbaum of PC Gamer gave the game a score of 72/100, stating it to be "a bloated, grindy mess, but so packed with options that a better game is hidden inside it."

The Switch version was panned by critics for being notably downgraded in order for it to adequately run on the console, being criticized for its low resolution and frame rate, minimal level of detail, blurry texturing, low poly models, stability issues, and loading times. John Linneman of Eurogamer likened the port to a "poorly compressed JPEG version of an impressionist painting". However, a rebuilt version for the Switch developed by Grove Street Games and released in 2022 was praised by Linneman as "one of the biggest improvements we've ever seen, turning the game from a hideous, unplayable mess into one of the more impressive Unreal Engine 4 titles we've seen on Nintendo Switch."

=== Sales ===
Within a month of its early access release on Steam, Ark had sold over one million copies. By August 2016, the game had over 5.5 million sales across both Windows and Xbox One, with about 1.5 million from the Xbox One platform.

Co-founder Jesse Rapczak explained that the release of the Genesis expansions was partially due to the unexpected market success of Extinction and the season pass, and partially due to his belief that the storyline of ARK could be expanded upon.

By June 2022, Ark: Survival Evolved had 76.5 million installs across PC and consoles, including 38.4 million from free promotions. In the fourth quarter of 2023, 745,000 units were sold, followed by 2.3 million more in 2024.

== Sequel and spin-offs ==
Two spin-off games developed by Snail Games' Peacock Studio and Snail Games USA, respectively, were released in March 2018: Ark Park, a virtual reality game, and PixARK, a sandbox survival game.

An educational spin-off developed by Grove Street Games, Ark: Dinosaur Discovery, was released in November 2021 for the Nintendo Switch.

Ark: Survival Ascended is an upgraded remaster of the original game using Unreal Engine 5. Originally slated for release in August 2023, the game was pushed back to October of that year.

A sequel, Ark 2, was announced at The Game Awards 2020. The game will star Vin Diesel and Auliʻi Cravalho. Co-developed with Grove Street Games, and originally planned for a 2023 launch, it was rescheduled to enter early access on Windows and Xbox Series X/S in late 2024, though this date passed without any further updates. The game will use Unreal Engine 5, instead of Unreal Engine 4 used in the original game, and feature a soulslike combat system. As of June 2025, Studio Wildcard expects Ark 2 to enter early access no earlier than 2027.

== Animated series ==
An animated series based on the game was announced at The Game Awards 2020 and features Madeleine Madden, Michelle Yeoh, Gerard Butler, Jeffrey Wright, David Tennant, Zahn McClarnon, Devery Jacobs, Ragga Ragnars, Elliot Page, Karl Urban, Malcolm McDowell, Deborah Mailman, Juliet Mills, Alan Tudyk, Ron Yuan, Russell Crowe, and Vin Diesel. The series premiered on Paramount+ on March 21, 2024.
