= Lual Mayen =

South Sudanese video developer (born 1993)

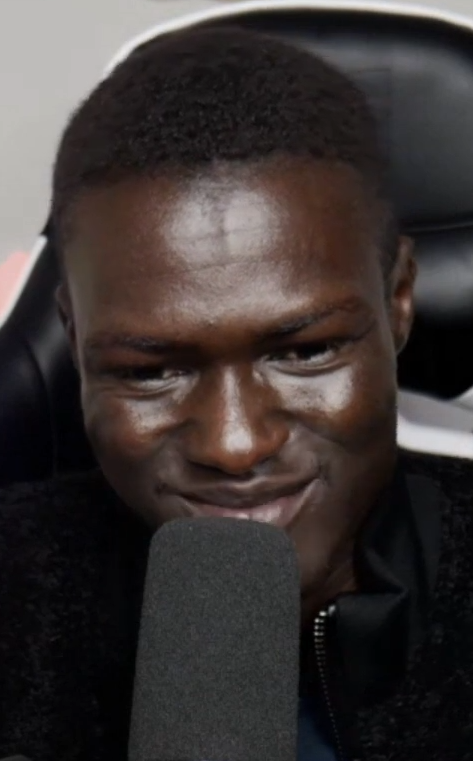
- Mayen in 2021
- Born: 4 November 1993 (age 33); Aswa, South Sudan
- Occupation: Video game developer

Lual Mayen is a South Sudanese video game developer and video game designer. He was born at the Aswa refugee camp in Sudan. In 1993, his family relocated to a refugee camp in Uganda. He was born into a family of seven.

== Career ==
Mayen is the founder and CEO of Junub Games.

During The Game Awards 2019 in Los Angeles, Mayen announced the video game Salaam ("Peace"). The game is about protecting communities.

== Honors ==
- Global Gaming Citizen at 2018 Game Awards, Los Angeles.
- CNN Champions for Change 2020.
