= Ryozo Tsujimoto =

Japanese video game producer

- 辻本良三
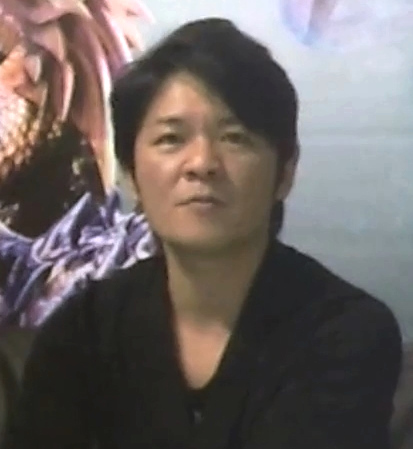
- Tsujimoto in 2016
- Born: October 18, 1973 (age 52); Habikino, Osaka, Japan
- Occupations: Video game designer, game producer
- Employer: Capcom (1996–present)
- Known for: Monster Hunter series

Ryozo Tsujimoto (辻本良三, Tsujimoto Ryozo) (born October 18, 1973) is a Japanese video game producer and game designer. He is currently an Executive Corporate Officer at Capcom.

He is also the son of Capcom founder and CEO Kenzo Tsujimoto, and the younger brother of President and COO Haruhiro Tsujimoto.

== Career ==
After graduating from university, Tsujimoto joined Capcom in April 1996. As an avid fan of video games since childhood, he wanted to work on games directly. He has also said that he feels he would "never be good" at an ordinary office workplace.

Tsujimoto was originally assigned as a planner of arcade games such as Battle Circuit and Tech Romancer. Afterwards, he started working on console games where he helped plan online software. One of these games was Monster Hunter (2004) where he was involved in online play planning and administration.

He has been the Monster Hunter series producer since the release of Monster Hunter Freedom 2 in 2007, helping oversee all aspects of production.

In 2018, he was promoted to be a Managing Corporate Officer as well as the Head of Consumer Games Development Division 2 at Capcom.

== Works ==
Year	Game	Role
1997	Battle Circuit	Planner
1998	Tech Romancer	Planner
2002	Auto Modellista	Planner
2004	Resident Evil Outbreak	Online system direction & planning
2004	Monster Hunter	Online system direction & planning
2004	Resident Evil Outbreak: File 2	Online system direction & planning
2005	Monster Hunter Freedom	Online system direction & planning
2007	Monster Hunter Freedom 2	Producer
2009	Monster Hunter Tri	Producer
2010	Monster Hunter Portable 3rd	Producer
2013	Monster Hunter 4	Senior producer
2015	Monster Hunter Generations	Executive producer
2016	Monster Hunter Stories	Senior producer
2018	Monster Hunter World	Senior producer
2019	Teppen	Executive producer
2021	Monster Hunter Rise	Senior producer
2021	Monster Hunter Stories 2: Wings of Ruin	Senior producer
2023	Street Fighter 6	Executive producer
2023	Exoprimal	Executive producer
2024	Apollo Justice: Ace Attorney Trilogy	Executive producer
2024	Ace Attorney Investigations Collection	Executive producer
2025	Monster Hunter Wilds	Senior producer
2026	Monster Hunter Stories 3: Twisted Reflection	Executive producer
2026	Mega Man Star Force Legacy Collection	Executive producer
2026	Onimusha: Way of the Sword	Executive producer
