= Tetsuya Shibata =

- 柴田徹也
- Born: October 24, 1973 (age 52); Osaka Prefecture, Japan
- Occupation: Composer
- Years active: 1997–present
- Employer: Capcom (1997–2009)
- Spouse: Yoshino Aoki (m. 2014)
- Musical career
- Genres: Jazz, classical, rock
- Instrument(s): Piano, guitar, bass

Tetsuya Shibata (柴田徹也, Shibata Tetsuya; born October 24, 1973) is a Japanese video game music composer and sound director. He is credited for over twenty musical scores produced for Capcom's video game releases including the Monster Hunter and Devil May Cry series, as well those in the Darkstalkers, Power Stone and Resident Evil Outbreak series. His later works with the company involved organizing orchestral recordings for Resident Evil 5 and Monster Hunter Tri. In 2009, Shibata left Capcom and began his own music studio, known as Unique Note, with colleague Yoshino Aoki.

== Biography ==
=== Early life ===
Shibata was born October 24, 1973, in Osaka, Japan. While growing up, his mother was a singer and a music teacher. Shibata began playing classical piano at a very young age. He taught himself how to play guitar, bass guitar, and drums while in junior high school and high school. Shibata completed a law degree from Kansai University in 1996. While at the university, he heavily studied classic, rock, and jazz genres outside of his major. He eventually bought a synthesizer to compose his own music.

=== Career ===
With a high interest in starting a career in the musical field, Shibata began applying for jobs in composition after college. Friends of some of his relatives introduced him to the video game industry. Shibata joined Capcom's Sound Management Section in 1997, where he took on various roles such as manager, director, producer, and composer for over twenty different games in a twelve-year span. His earliest works were many fighting games such as the Darkstalkers and Power Stone series. Among other titles, Shibata, alongside Mitsuhiko Takano and frequent collaborator Masato Kouda, created the score for the first game in Capcom's successful Monster Hunter series. Notably, Shibata composed music for the second, third, and fourth installments in Capcom's highly regarded Devil May Cry series. In later releases he chose to replace electronic music with vocal songs in the games' various battle and ending themes to make the music more recognizable for each game. One of these pieces, "Out of Darkness" from Devil May Cry 4, was nominated for a Game Audio Network Guild (G.A.N.G.) Award in 2009. He proclaimed that his favorite project so far has been Devil May Cry 3: Dante's Awakening, on which he did all the sound production. He also personally found this to be the most challenging project in his career. Shibata's role in the soundtrack production of 2006's Dead Rising involved bringing in licensed music alongside Capcom's in-house compositions.

In late 2008 and early 2009, Shibata worked as senior sound director on two major releases. For Resident Evil 5, he organized recordings by the Hollywood Studio Symphony, and did the same for Monster Hunter Tri with the FILMharmonic Orchestra in Prague. In addition, he produced the Monster Hunter Orchestra Concert, a concert celebrating the fifth anniversary of the Monster Hunter franchise. Some of his compositions from the original Monster Hunter were performed. This would be his last role at Capcom, as he states that he left the company because he wanted to create music for a wide range of companies and genres, including those outside of video games. Torn between his responsibilities as a manager and his desire to compose music more freely, he was reluctant to leave the game developer because he had many ongoing projects at the time. His superior informed him that Capcom would not argue with his decision.

In May 2009, he founded and became the president of his own music company known as Unique Note. The company aspires to create music for several types of media like television, commercials, films, and film trailers, as well as video games. Shibata himself plays guitar, bass guitar, and keyboard for his own compositions. Early in the company's establishment, Shibata was joined by another former Capcom composer, Yoshino Aoki, who is now the group's vice president as well as a composer, arranger, and lyricist. Shibata had previously worked with Aoki on several projects at Capcom. He had gained respect for her musical talent over the years, especially for her score of Breath of Fire IV which he experienced while he was putting together the Breath of Fire Original Soundtrack Special Box in 2006. He later married Aoki in 2014. So far Unique Note has worked on musical scores for Fullmetal Alchemist: Senka wo Takuseshi Mono and Half-Minute Hero for the PlayStation Portable, as well as two musicals.

== Musical style and influences ==
Shibata lists musical influences from many different genres before joining Capcom. As a child, he was exposed to the classical styles of Frédéric Chopin and Franz Schubert. In middle school he listened to Britpop bands Kajagoogoo and Boy George. In high school, he became interested in rock bands such as Aerosmith, Guns N' Roses, and Led Zeppelin. By college, he began listening to the jazz stylings of Oscar Peterson, Makoto Ozone, Chick Corea, and Baptiste Trotignon.

== Works ==
Year	Title	Notes
1997	Vampire Hunter 2: Darkstalkers' Revenge	with Takayuki Iwai
1997	Vampire Savior 2: The Lord of Vampire	with Takayuki Iwai
1998	Street Fighter Alpha 3	with several others
1998	Plasma Sword: Nightmare of Bilstein	with Takayuki Iwai
1999	Power Stone	
2000	Marvel vs. Capcom 2: New Age of Heroes	with Mitsuhiko Takano
2000	Vampire Chronicle for Matching Service	with Yuko Takehara
2000	Power Stone 2	
2001	Heavy Metal: Geomatrix	
2002	Auto Modellista	with Isao Abe
2003	Devil May Cry 2	with Masato Kouda and Satoshi Ise
2004	Resident Evil Outbreak	with Mitsuhiko Takano, Kento Hasegawa and Etsuko Yoneda
2004	Monster Hunter	with Masato Kouda
2005	Resident Evil Outbreak: File #2	with Mitsuhiko Takano, Kento Hasegawa and Etsuko Yoneda
2005	Devil May Cry 3	with Kento Hasegawa
2006	Dead Rising	Sound manager
2007	Monster Hunter Freedom 2	Sound coordination
2008	Devil May Cry 4	with several others
2008	Monster Hunter Freedom Unite	Sound coordination
2009	Fullmetal Alchemist: Senka wo Takuseshi Mono	with Yoshino Aoki
2009	Half-Minute Hero	with several others
2009	Resident Evil 5	Sound producer
2009	Monster Hunter Tri	Sound manager
2011	Otomedius Excellent	with several others
2011	Earth Seeker	with Yoshino Aoki
2011	Half-Minute Hero: The Second Coming	with several others
2014	Merc Storia	with Yoshino Aoki and Kenichi Tendo
2014	Super Smash Bros. for Nintendo 3DS and Wii U	Arrangements (Note: "Ground Theme / Underground Theme (Super Mario Bros.)" and "The Great Sea / Menu Select")
2015	Transformers: Devastation	with several others
2016	Uppers	with Yoshino Aoki, Yuko Komiyama, and Jun Okubo
2016	Justice Monsters Five	with Unique Note
2016	Final Fantasy XV	with Yoko Shimomura, Yoshino Aoki, and Yoshitaka Suzuki
2018	Super Smash Bros. Ultimate	Arrangements (Note: "Lost Painting", "Prelude (Ablaze)", and "Wrecking Crew Medley")
2022	Gungrave G.O.R.E	Main theme
2023	Resident Evil 4	with several others

=== Other works ===
- Breath of Fire Original Soundtrack Special Box (2006)
- Monster Hunter Orchestra Concert ~Hunting Music Festival~ (2009)
- Rakuen (2009) – with Yoshino Aoki
- Suisei (2009) - with Yoshino Aoki
