= Felyne =

Fictional cat-like race in the Monster Hunter series

- Monster Hunter race
- Two Felynes from Monster Hunter Portable 3rd wearing armor
- First appearance: Monster Hunter (2004)
- Created by: Capcom

The Felyne (Japanese: アイルー, romanized: airū), is a fictional species in the Monster Hunter video game series developed by Capcom. Since Monster Hunter Generations, Palico refers to specific skilled Felynes who accompany player characters, or "hunters", as AI-controlled partners. Felynes have become a popular mascot for the series, and have featured in spin-off games, many cross-promotions with other Capcom and non-Capcom video games, and various Japanese consumer products.

== Characteristics ==
Felynes are members of the Lynian species of beastmen, which also includes other, similar races like the lynx-like Grimalkynes. Small in stature compared to humans, they have an appearance similar to the domestic cat, but are fully sentient, bipedal, and can speak the human language. Felynes who partner with a hunter wear miniature suits of armor. Felynes assist the player in cooking meals, maintaining gardens, and returning them to camp if they are defeated in battle. Their use as servants also extends to the villages of Riders, humans who tame rather than hunt monsters, where they perform tasks such as farming and animal husbandry.

Several types of designs have been used to represent the Felynes in different media. In addition to the classic, realistic design used in main series games, there is a chibi design used in the spin-off games with an oversized head and large, circular eyes. Designs more resembling cartoons are used in Monster Hunter Stories for the unique Felyne Navirou and his comrades, The Numbers.

== Appearances ==
=== Video games ===
Felynes have appeared in every game in the Monster Hunter series. Spin-off games featuring Felynes include Monster Hunter Diary: Poka Poka Airou Village, developed by FromSoftware for the Nintendo 3DS, which was also bundled with a purple PSP system, and a PSP version of Super Puzzle Fighter II Turbo called Felyne de Puzzle. A mobile game called Poka Poka Felyne Reversi was also developed.

Crossovers often involve Felyne outfits based on other video games. For Monster Hunter: World, this included a Horizon Zero Dawn skin.

=== Other media ===
Felynes featured in the Monster Hunter live-action film, with director Paul W.S. Anderson stating that "you couldn't make a Monster Hunter movie without having a Palico in it" in response to fan concerns that Felynes would be excluded, also saying that "definitely we lean in to the Palico". An unusually large Felyne cook called the Meowscular Chef received notoriety for his appearances both in Monster Hunter: World, and the live-action movie, where he is a sidekick to the Admiral and has a "flirtatious relationship" with Captain Artemis, played by Milla Jovovich. The Meowscular Chef has been adapted for use as a custom skin in a fan-made mod for Monster Hunter World.

== Development ==
The noises of Felynes are created using the real-life vocalizations of cats owned by the games' development team, causing them to compile a library of cat noises stretching back to the original Monster Hunter. The noises are sometimes arranged in order to depict a situation that would be impossible to subject a real cat to, such as being attacked by a monster.

== Merchandise ==
In 2013, several Monster Hunter 4 figures were given away as prizes in Japan, including ones based on Felynes. In 2014, a Mega Man crossover toy was released, a set of Felyne-themed 3DS XL accessories, as well as a 24 karat gold Felyne statue that cost almost $30,000 to celebrate the series' 10-year anniversary. In 2017, a highly detailed doll of a Felyne was released by Capcom for 162,000 yen. More unusual products include Felyne toilet paper-holders. Beyond merchandise, a Felyne-themed car was used to promote the series at the Odaiba Motor Festival. In 2022, merchandise featuring the characters was utilized in a public safety promotion as part of an ongoing partnership between Capcom and local Japanese police.

== Reception ==
Dom Peppiatt of VG247 remarked that Felynes were "cute" and a "staple" of Monster Hunter, saying that the series had a "slight obsession with cats" for a long time. Calling Felynes "small in stature (but big in personality)", he said that "these mascot characters have become integral to Monster Hunter's world". James Whitbrook of Gizmodo also called them a staple character, as well as "gosh darn adorable" with "incredibly cute armor", and expressed his pleasure that Felynes were featured in the Monster Hunter film. Praising the depiction of Meowscular Chef in Monster Hunter: World as "hilarious", he was excited that the character would be brought to the film as a homage, calling the Chef his "new best friend".

Garrett Martin of Endless Mode praised the Prowler mode in Monster Hunter Generations which allowed the player to play as a Palico, wishing that it had been integrated into Monster Hunter Wilds, and described every Palico as "perfect from the start", calling his hunter "the most generic RPG character ever designed" in comparison. He went further to say that he wished that the entire game solely featured Palicos instead of humans. The Palicoes in Monster Hunter: World received a great deal of social media publicity when their vocalizations attracted the real-life cats of players. Gene Park of The Washington Post said that the games had the "scourge of driving real animals up the wall", adding that "pets being distracted or noticing Monster Hunter games is a tradition among all Monster Hunter fans with pets." The option for them to speak English was added to the later Wilds, though Martin described selecting the option as "utterly deranged", greatly favoring their catlike sounds.

The Palico outfits in Wilds were described by Sean Martin of PC Gamer as "extremely weird", including one that gave the Palico squid legs or put their brain in a jar. He described it as "a nice distraction from the fact that Palico builds have kind of been gutted" in the game compared to its predecessor, also lamenting the lack of the Meowscular Chef.
