= Monster Hunter (video game) =

2004 video game

- North American PlayStation 2 box art
- Developer: Capcom Production Studio 1
- Publisher: Capcom
- Director: Kaname Fujioka
- Producers: Tsuyoshi Tanaka; Kenji Itsuno
- Designers: Katsuhiro Eguchi; Tsuyoshi Nagayama; Shintaro Kojima; Kent Kinoshita; Kouki Fuse; Tomohiro Nakai
- Composers: Masato Kouda; Tetsuya Shibata
- Series: Monster Hunter
- Platforms: PlayStation 2, Wii
- Release: PlayStation 2: JP: March 11, 2004; NA: September 21, 2004; PAL: May 27, 2005; PlayStation 2 (G): JP: January 20, 2005; Wii (G): JP: April 23, 2009
- Genre: Action role-playing
- Modes: Single-player, multiplayer

Monster Hunter is a 2004 action role-playing game developed and published by Capcom for the PlayStation 2. The first installment of the Monster Hunter series, it was originally released in Japan in March 2004, in North America in September 2004 and in Europe in May 2005. It was remade and expanded in Monster Hunter G, which was released in Japan for the PlayStation 2 (later ported to the Wii) and was brought to North America and Europe as Monster Hunter Freedom for the PlayStation Portable.

Much of the game can be played offline through single-player. The majority of the content is in the online section of the game. Only some monsters are found in single-player and the player's rewards are smaller (and less valuable) when they are offline. The goal for players online is not to defeat the most monsters but to reach the highest hunter rank, which is the storyline that is carried out online by non-player characters.

== Gameplay ==
Monster Hunter places the player in the role of an up-and-coming hunter who must accomplish various quests to achieve glory. Armors, weapons, and other items are created from the remains of slain monsters by carving off their horns, scales and bones, as well as from mining for ores in the field. Monster Hunter plays in a similar fashion to Phantasy Star Online allowing the player to team up with up to three other hunters online to take down stronger monsters.

Monster Hunter is played through quests given to the hunter by the Village Elder or the Town Guild. Village Quests can be classified into four categories: hunting, gathering, capture and event. They are also categorized into different levels, ranging from 1 to 8. Higher level quests become available after quests in the previous level are completed. There are three types of quests:

- Hunting: Hunting quests make up the majority of the missions. As the name implies, the hunter will track, provoke, and eventually slay a monster or a number of monsters.
- Gathering: Gathering quests are missions in which the hunter must "gather" items like herbs or monster parts.
- Capture: The hunter must weaken, but not kill the prey, and then capture it with a trap.

The Event quests are an online-only feature. Every week, a new Event quest is available to hunters of any rank. These quests vary in style and difficulty. Some of the rarer weapons can be made only through Event quest rewards. Event quests are not vital to a hunter's success in the game, but are a useful way to gain experience and to obtain some rare items. Contract fees and time limits vary. All of the quests allow two deaths, but the third death marks the failure of the quest. Regardless of which player actually dies, three deaths will still fail the quest. The only exceptions to this rule are some of the Event quests and all the Training missions, which are failed with just one death.

Hunters can be classified as either Blademasters or Gunners. The Blademaster classification consists of five sub-categories: Sword and Shield, Great Swords, Lances, Hammers, and Dual Swords (Dual Swords were added in the international release and are thus unavailable in the original Japanese release). Blademaster weapons can also be of a certain element, be it fire, water, thunder or dragon as well as status effects such as poison, stun or sleep. Gunners have two choices: Light bowgun, and Heavy Bowgun. Classifications and use of sub-category weapons are not chosen and solidified into a file; hunters are able to choose to use any weapon they want, before the start of any quest or event, as long as they have the proper money and/or supplies to do so.

Armor is always dependent on whether one chooses to use a Blademaster or Gunner weapon (excluding some few which can be worn either way). Blademaster armor usually focuses on stronger physical protection, while Gunner armor usually focuses on elemental protection. Certain armor combinations provide the user with skills such as fast eating (drinking potions faster) or being able to sharpen your weapon fast and better.

Combining ingredients to make items such as healing potions or traps for monsters is a very important feature. Although many of the combinations must be discovered by the player, some combinations are hinted at throughout the game. Success is dependent on many factors, such as rarity of the items to be combined and amount of "combo books" a player has on hand or even certain armor skills. Some of the items in the game of the highest rarity can only be obtained by combining.

== Development ==
Monster Hunter was a part of an initiative from Capcom's Production Studio 1 to develop three network focused games on the PlayStation 2. The other games were Auto Modellista and Resident Evil Outbreak. Capcom's plan was that at least one of the games would sell a million copies. Both Monster Hunter and Resident Evil Outbreak eventually sold a million copies each.

=== Online game support ===
Monster Hunter's online servers outside Japan were closed down on December 31, 2007.

"After more than 3 years of online service, the external company providing server hosting for both Resident Evil: Outbreak and Monster Hunter has decided to exit the PlayStation 2 online business altogether, with no possibility of outsourcing either the service or the technology."

Monster Hunter's online servers in Japan closed down on July 1, 2011. (PlayStation 2 versions only)

== Expansions and ports ==
A new version called Monster Hunter G was released in Japan for the PlayStation 2 on January 20, 2005. It was meant to be an expansion for the original Japanese Monster Hunter.It was later ported to the PlayStation Portable in Japan and released in America and Europe under the title Monster Hunter Freedom. Some of the expanded content included Dual Swords (import from North America version), monster color changes and other monster varieties with varying difficulty. Monster Hunter G was released on April 23, 2009, for the Wii in Japan with the Monster Hunter Tri demo. There was also an extra package which included a special edition classic controller.

== Reception ==
Reception

Aggregate score
Aggregator	Score
Metacritic	68/100

Review scores
Publication	Score
Edge	8/10
Electronic Gaming Monthly	8/10
Famitsu	32/40
Game Informer	5/10
GameRevolution	C
GameSpot	5.7/10
GameSpy	3/5
GameZone	7/10
IGN	7.2/10
Official U.S. PlayStation Magazine	4/5
The Sydney Morning Herald	4/5

The game received "mixed or average" reviews according to video game review aggregator Metacritic. In Japan, Famitsu gave it a score of all four eights, for a total of 32 out of 40.

== Sequels ==
Monster Hunter 2 was released in Japan on February 16, 2006; Monster Hunter Freedom 2, based on Monster Hunter 2, was released worldwide throughout 2007. Monster Hunter Freedom Unite is another expansion to the PSP Monster Hunter game.

Monster Hunter Tri was originally announced for the PlayStation 3 but was switched to the Wii. It features new mission modes as well as new monsters and items. This information was revealed in 2007 at Nintendo's Japanese press conference.

Monster Hunter 4 was released on the Nintendo 3DS in Japan on September 14, 2013. On January 26, 2014, Monster Hunter 4G was released in Japan, and on February 13, 2015, under the name Monster Hunter 4 Ultimate, was released worldwide.

Monster Hunter: World was released worldwide on January 26, 2018, for PlayStation 4 and Xbox One, with a Windows version released August 9, 2018. On September 6, 2019, Monster Hunter World: Iceborne, a major paid expansion for World, was released worldwide, with a PC version releasing January 9, 2020.

Monster Hunter Rise was released worldwide on March 26, 2021, for Nintendo Switch, with a Windows version released January 12, 2022. A major paid expansion, Monster Hunter Rise Sunbreak, was released worldwide on June 30, 2022, for Nintendo Switch and Windows.

Monster Hunter Wilds was released worldwide on February 28, 2025, for PlayStation 5, Xbox Series X and Series S, and Windows.
