= List of best-selling PlayStation Portable video games =

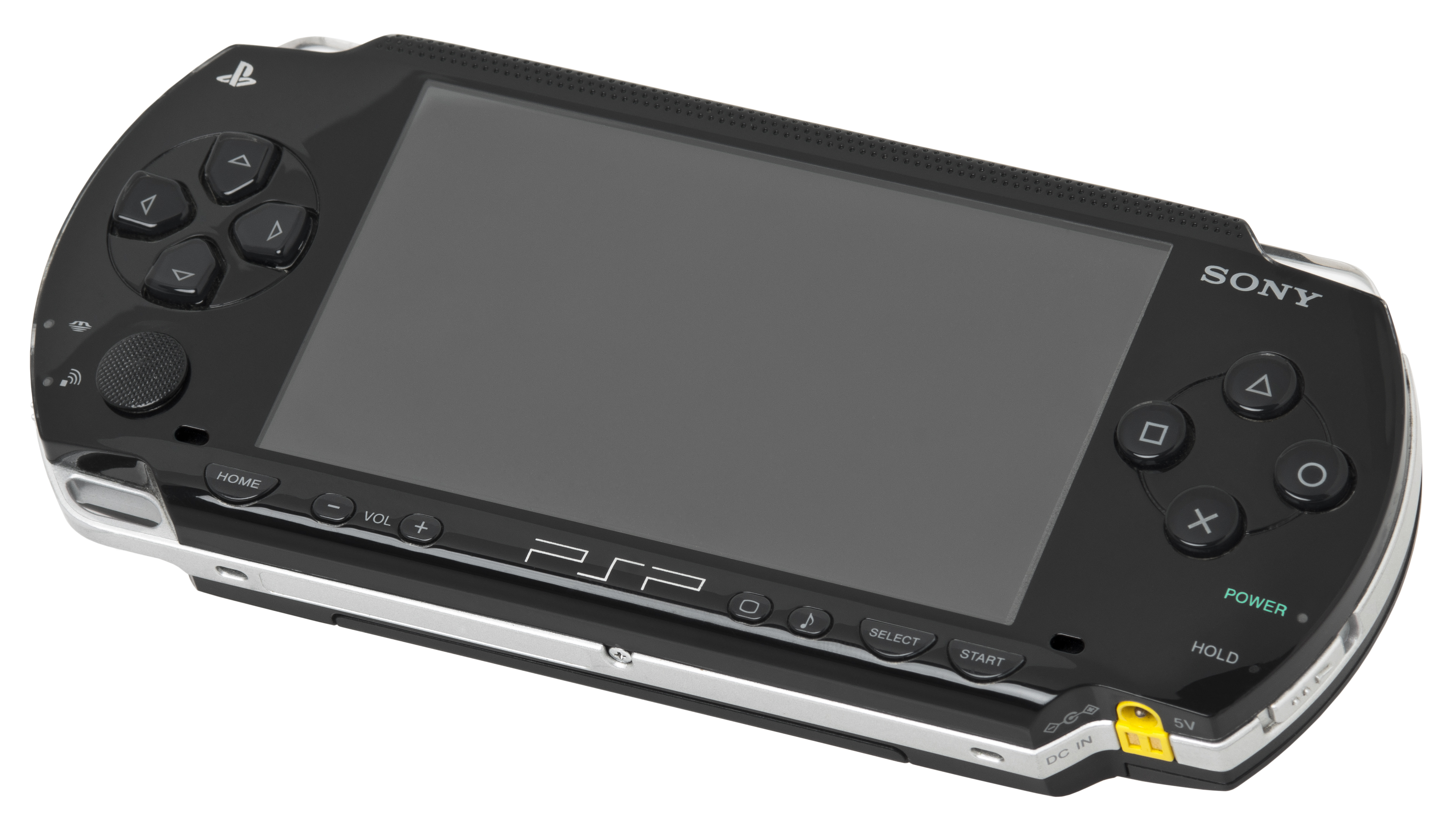
PlayStation Portable

This is a list of video games for the PlayStation Portable video game console that have sold or shipped at least one million copies. The best-selling games on the PlayStation Portable include Grand Theft Auto: Liberty City Stories (2005) with 7.5 million units, Monster Hunter Portable 3rd (2010) with 4.9 million units, Gran Turismo (2009) with over 4.6 million, Ratchet & Clank: Size Matters (2007) with 4.4 million, and Monster Hunter Freedom Unite (2008) with 3.8 million.

As of March 31, 2012, over 331 million total copies of games have been sold for the PlayStation Portable.

== List ==
Game	Copies sold	Release date (Note: Only the initial release date on this platform is listed.)	Genre(s)	Developer(s)	Publisher(s)
Grand Theft Auto: Liberty City Stories	7.5 million	October 24, 2005	Action-adventure	Rockstar Leeds; Rockstar North	Rockstar Games
Monster Hunter Portable 3rd	4.9 million	December 1, 2010	Action role-playing	Capcom	Capcom
Gran Turismo	4.67 million	October 1, 2009	Sim racing	Polyphony Digital	Sony Computer Entertainment
Ratchet & Clank: Size Matters	4.4 million	February 13, 2007	Platformer; third-person shooter	High Impact Games	Sony Computer Entertainment
Monster Hunter Freedom Unite	3.8 million	March 27, 2008	Action role-playing	Capcom	Capcom
God of War: Chains of Olympus	3.2 million	March 4, 2008	Action-adventure; hack and slash	Ready at Dawn	WW: Sony Computer Entertainment; JP: Capcom
Crisis Core: Final Fantasy VII	3.1 million (Note: Crisis Core: Final Fantasy VII sales breakdown: Japan – 830,000)	September 13, 2007	Action role-playing	Square Enix	Square Enix
Monster Hunter Freedom 2	2.4 million	February 22, 2007	Action role-playing	Capcom Production Studio 1	Capcom
Daxter	2.3 million	March 14, 2006	Platform	Ready at Dawn	Sony Computer Entertainment
Tekken: Dark Resurrection	2.2 million (Note: Tekken: Dark Resurrection sales breakdown: Europe – 1 million)	July 6, 2006	Fighting	8ing	Namco
Metal Gear Solid: Peace Walker	2.06 million (Note: Metal Gear Solid: Peace Walker sales breakdown: Japan – 958,461; United States – over 52,000)	April 29, 2010	Action-adventure; stealth	Kojima Productions	Konami
Dissidia Final Fantasy	1.81 million (Note: Dissidia Final Fantasy sales breakdown: Japan – 995,398; United States – 440,000; Europe – 380,000)	December 18, 2008	Fighting	Square Enix	Square Enix
Midnight Club 3: Dub Edition	1.4 million (Note: Midnight Club 3: Dub Edition sales breakdown: United States – 1.1 million; United Kingdom – 300,000)	June 27, 2005	Racing	Rockstar San Diego	Rockstar Games
Need for Speed: Most Wanted 5-1-0	1.32 million (Note: Need for Speed: Most Wanted sales breakdown: Japan – 27.151; United States – 1.1 million; United Kingdom – 200,000)	November 15, 2005	Racing	EA Black Box; EA Canada	Electronic Arts
Monster Hunter Freedom	1.3 million	December 1, 2005	Action role-playing	Capcom Production Studio 1	Capcom
Kingdom Hearts Birth by Sleep	1.27 million	January 9, 2010	Action role-playing	Square Enix	Square Enix
God Eater	1.22 million (Note: God Eater sales breakdown: God Eater; Japan – 617,828; God Eater Burst; Japan – 612,978)	February 4, 2010	Action role-playing	Shift	WW: Bandai Namco Entertainment; NA: D3 Publisher
God of War: Ghost of Sparta	1.2 million	November 2, 2010	Action-adventure; hack and slash	Ready at Dawn	Sony Computer Entertainment
Metal Gear Solid: Portable Ops	1.18 million	December 5, 2006	Action-adventure; stealth	Kojima Productions	Konami
Secret Agent Clank	1.1 million	June 17, 2008	Platformer	High Impact Games	Sony Computer Entertainment
Star Wars: Battlefront II	1.1 million (Note: Star Wars: Battlefront II sales breakdown: Japan – 17,878; United States – over 1 million; United Kingdom – 100,000)	October 31, 2005	Third-person shooter; first-person shooter	Pandemic Studios	LucasArts
Hot Shots Golf: Open Tee	1 million	December 12, 2004	Golf	Clap Hanz	Sony Computer Entertainment
Wipeout Pure	1 million	March 24, 2005	Racing	Studio Liverpool	Sony Computer Entertainment
WWE SmackDown vs. Raw 2008	1 million	November 13, 2007	Sports	Yuke's	THQ
