= Monster Hunter World: Iceborne =

- Developer: Capcom
- Publisher: Capcom
- Director: Daisuke Ichihara
- Producer: Ryozo Tsujimoto
- Artist: Kaname Fujioka
- Composers: Akihiko Narita; Akiyuki Morimoto; Zhenlan Kang
- Series: Monster Hunter
- Engine: MT Framework
- Platforms: PlayStation 4; Xbox One; Windows
- Release: PlayStation 4, Xbox One; September 6, 2019; Windows; January 9, 2020
- Genre: Action role-playing
- Modes: Single-player, multiplayer

Monster Hunter World: Iceborne is an expansion pack developed and published by Capcom for the 2018 action role-playing game Monster Hunter: World. It was released for PlayStation 4 and Xbox One in September 2019 and for Windows in January 2020. It introduces new monsters, improved gameplay mechanics and a new story set in Hoarfrost Reach, an arctic-themed region. The game was both a commercial and critical success, selling more than 8.5 million copies upon release.

== Gameplay ==
Similar to the base game, Iceborne the player takes the role of a Hunter, slaying or trapping large monsters solo or cooperatively with other players. Iceborne features a new arctic ecosystem named Hoarfrost Reach, said to be one of the largest maps created by the team, where players will encounter both new and returning creatures. As the player slowly progresses in the story, more areas in Hoarfrost Reach will be opened up for players to explore. As it is set in a cold environment, players need to consume hot drinks or visit hotsprings so that their stamina would not deplete. Snow would also slow down the player's movement. Seliana was Hoarfrost Reach's hub area, where players can visit weaponsmiths and chefs. The expansion features a new fast travel system called Raider Rides, allowing players to tame and ride on smaller creatures to either travel to a designed point on the map or to track a monster, with the player still gathering certain resources while in transit.

Capcom also introduced new combat options and gadgets in Iceborne, such as giving players the ability to grapple onto monsters with the new Clutch Claw gadget, and stun creatures using Flinch Shot. The Slinger can also now be used with the primary weapons drawn out. All weapons archetypes gained expanded upgrade paths, as well as additional combat moves to help improve their potency. Existing armor and weapon gear gained additional upgrade levels. Iceborne also introduced new layered armors, allowing players to equip additional armor pieces atop their existing armor sets to customize the outward appearance of the hunter, while keeping the same equipment skills. Iceborne introduces a new hunter rank named Master Rank. Upon reaching Master Rank, players would encounter more challenging enemies and creatures, though they would also gain better rewards such as receiving new armour sets.

== Story ==
When a mysterious song is suddenly heard across the New World and spurs a mass flock of Wyvern-like Legiana to suddenly migrate beyond the sea, the Research Commission investigates. They track the Legiana to a polar subcontinent and set up a base of operations there, which they dub the Hoarfrost Reach and Seliana respectively. As the Hunter and Handler explore the land, they discover evidence of unusual seismic activity which seemingly caused the ecological changes that prompted the Legiana migration. Meanwhile, the Tracker conducts her own investigation into her long-missing mentor. Her search proves fruitful, as she finds the wreckage of her mentor's ship and a scrap of cloth denoting the existence of a monster known as the "Old Everwyrm", seemingly linking the song and seismic action.

Back in Astera, the ecological disturbances have caused more powerful monsters to appear, including an ice Elder Dragon, Velkhana. As it freezes environments all over the New World, the Commission decides that, unless they fight back, the ecosystem will become too hostile to continue their expedition. The Hunter is sent to confront the Elder Dragon and successfully drives it back to its home in the Hoarfrost Reach. However, this causes it to begin encroaching on Seliana, forcing the Hunter to drive it back again, before tracking it down and finishing it off once and for all. Upon Velkhana's defeat, however, the song is heard once again and causes more seismic activity. The Commission finds a pattern in the places where the song appears and predicts where it will appear next. Traveling there with the Handler and Tracker, the Hunter finds the Old Everwyrm, a quartz-skinned Elder Dragon named Shara Ishvalda. The fight between it and the commission is interrupted, however, when a Nergigante appears and kills the Elder Dragon. This act causes the Admiral to deduce the species' place in the food chain: killing monsters that threaten the ecosystem.

Later, the Hunter and the Handler track the Nergigante to a brand new subcontinental island, an amalgam of different habitats and ecosystems which they dub the Guiding Lands. The Commission elects to continue exploring this new land and uncover its mysteries as well. Within the Guiding Lands, the Commission encounters more monsters previously unseen in the new world before finding a powerful red dragon, which they learn is the adult form of Xeno'Jiiva. The Commission dub the creature Safi'Jiiva before battling it in a series of skirmishes intended to weaken it. The Hunter and allies eventually succeed in slaying the dragon before it has a chance to venture out of its lair.

Shortly after their encounter with Safi'Jiiva, the Commission encounters the powerful Elder Dragon Alatreon. The dragon moves in on Safi'Jiiva's territory, seemingly having arrived in the Guiding Lands to challenge the red dragon for dominance. As Alatreon is both aggressive and unstable, the Hunter battles the monster and seemingly slays it. A short time later however, another Alatreon appears, severely wounded. The Hunter defeats the dragon before it can cause any damage, only to learn that it was fleeing another monster: the legendary black dragon Fatalis. The Commission is approached by the Guild from the old world, who explain that they have tracked Fatalis to the kingdom of Schrade, which Fatalis completely destroyed in a single night. The Guild asks the Commission to aid in slaying Fatalis before it has a chance to do to the rest of the world what it did to Schrade.

Arriving in Schrade, the Commission finds the entire kingdom in ruins. As they attempt to prepare for the upcoming battle, they are interrupted by Fatalis itself. The Hunter and Excitable A-Lister hold off Fatalis while the rest of the Commission flee, however the A-Lister is soon badly injured, leaving the Hunter to face the dragon alone. The Hunter and Fatalis engage in a destructive battle that ends with the dragon's death. Believing the world to be safe with Fatalis gone, the Hunter and their allies return to Astera to celebrate their victory.

== Development and release ==
At the end of 2018, Capcom announced a major expansion to Monster Hunter: World as "Iceborne", which was released on September 6, 2019 for the PlayStation 4 and Xbox One, and for Windows on January 9, 2020. Iceborne adds new hunting areas, monsters, quests, and additional story content taking place after the events of World, at a size estimated to be similar to past expansions that they have added to previous titles. Limited time beta access to Iceborne content (not requiring the base World game) was made available to PlayStation 4 owners in June 2019. Iceborne is the only major expansion planned for Monster Hunter: World as it completes the game's story, with only minor, but free, downloadable content being produced for it afterwards.

The development team have equated Iceborne to the previous expanded release games from past Monster Hunter games, such as Monster Hunter 4 Ultimate in comparison to Monster Hunter 4. Like these games, Iceborne added a third overall rank for hunters; while past games have called this "G rank", the team opted to use "Master Rank" because of the lack of familiarity with the G rank term in Western releases. Master Rank hunts are even more difficult than High Rank, but offer more lucrative rewards towards better weapons and armor equipment. The development team said that the difficulty curve for Iceborne was expected to be steeper than for the base game, as with the base game, they knew they needed to bring players unfamiliar with the games with a gentle approach, while players entering the Iceborne content would have been experienced already.

Iceborne offers a new tundra-like area, requiring players to deal with the effects of cold weather and crossing through snow-filled fields, but new tools and equipment were added for support. As the developers have anticipated that some players may not have finished World's core content prior to Iceborne, the expansion includes features to help players more easily complete World to get into the new content; for example, Iceborne's new weapon moves and the Clutch Claw is available across the base game and expansion, and players are given an advanced armor set that can help with more difficult World content and works for initial Iceborne hunts.

Some gameplay changes introduced in Iceborne were a part of free updates for the base game. A specific change impacts the multiplayer hunting difficulty. In the base game, hunts were scaled to either a single player, or to a party of four; hunt difficulty was dynamically scaled upward if additional people joined, but if they departed before the hunt was over, the hunt remained at that difficulty. The Iceborne patch includes a third difficulty level for two-player parties and the hunt dynamically scales downwards if players depart.

As with the base World game, Capcom added new monsters over several free updates, which include returning monsters from past Monster Hunter games and variants of existing monsters in the current game, which typically brought new weapons, armor, and locales to the game. Some updates included quality-of-life improvements for the base game which were also extended for players of Monster Hunter World who did not purchase Iceborne. Updates were originally released to console and then later to personal computer but by April 2020, Capcom had been able to bring the personal computer version to parity, so that all future updates would be released at the same time for both consoles and computers. These free updates continued through October 2020, with the introduction of Fatalis, which Capcom stated will be the last major update, though they will continue to support the game with patches and seasonal events. A December 2020 update brought in weekly rotations of the prior seasonal and special events as well as making nearly all event quests accessible at all times.

== Reception ==
Reception

Aggregate score
Aggregator	Score
Metacritic	PS4: 89/100; XONE: 90/100; PC: 87/100

Review scores
Publication	Score
Destructoid	9/10
Game Informer	8.25/10
GameSpot	9/10
GamesRadar+	4.5/5
IGN	9/10
PC Gamer (US)	82/100
PCGamesN	8/10
Push Square	9/10
USgamer	4.5/5

Iceborne received "generally favorable" reviews according to review aggregator Metacritic, with critics praising the scale of the expansion, being nearly equal in content size to the original game. Capcom reported that global shipments of Iceborne, including digital and retail copies, exceeded 2.5 million a week after its release.

By December 2020, total sales for Iceborne reached 7.2 million. In May 2022, Capcom confirmed that Monster Hunter World: Iceborne had sold 9.2 million copies.

=== Accolades ===
Year	Award	Category	Result	Ref(s).
2019	Gamescom 2019	Best Ongoing Game (Iceborne)	Won	
2019	Golden Joystick Awards	Best Game Expansion (Iceborne)	Nominated	
2019	The Game Awards 2019	Best RPG (Iceborne)	Nominated	
2020	NAVGTR Awards 2020	Character Design	Nominated	
2020	NAVGTR Awards 2020	Game, Franchise Role Playing	Won	
2020	SXSW Gaming Awards 2020	Excellence in Multiplayer	Nominated	
2020	Famitsu Dengeki Game Awards 2019	Best Graphics	Nominated	
2020	Famitsu Dengeki Game Awards 2019	Best Online Game	Nominated	
2020	Famitsu Dengeki Game Awards 2019	Best Action Game	Nominated	
