= Rathalos =

Fictional monster from the Monster Hunter series

- Monster Hunter race
- Rathalos as depicted in promotional artwork for the series
- First appearance: Monster Hunter (2004)
- Created by: Capcom

Rathalos (Japanese: リオレウス, Rioreusu) is a fictional monster in Capcom's Monster Hunter media franchise. Introduced in the original Monster Hunter in 2004, it is a large red wyvern characterized by its ability to fly and breathe fire. Rathalos has subsequently appeared throughout the series, with its design and combat behaviour being revised between successive generations of video games.

Rathalos has become one of the principal creatures associated with Monster Hunter, and has been described by publications including Game Informer and Famitsu as an iconic or representative monster of the series. Beyond the main games, it has featured prominently in the Monster Hunter Stories spin-offs and has represented the franchise in crossovers with Metal Gear Solid: Peace Walker, Final Fantasy XIV and Super Smash Bros. Ultimate. Rathalos was also among the major creatures adapted for the 2020 live-action film Monster Hunter.

== Concept and development ==
During development of the original Monster Hunter, the game's monsters were intended to possess stronger individual characterization than the player-controlled hunters. Art director Kaname Fujioka later explained that because the hunters functioned primarily as player avatars, the monsters needed distinctive silhouettes, colours and characteristics to make them memorable. Rathian, the female counterpart to Rathalos, was the first large monster designed for the game and became a basis for the development of subsequent large monsters. Rathalos was used as the cover monster of the original game.

Rathalos was created within a broader design philosophy in which Capcom sought to give the series' fantastical monsters characteristics derived from living animals. Producer Ryozo Tsujimoto has described the monsters as the most important element of Monster Hunter and said that developers used real animals and sources such as National Geographic as references, while attempting to make the creatures biologically plausible within their fictional environments. The series increasingly emphasized interactions between these creatures and their environments. In discussing Monster Hunter: World, Tsujimoto said the developers wanted monsters, smaller animals and plants to possess their own behaviours and interact as parts of a living ecosystem.

The appearance and behaviour of Rathalos have changed alongside this broader development of the series. Famitsu, in a 2025 retrospective devoted to the monster, noted that its original incarnation was slimmer than later designs, although its defining aerial and fire-based attacks were already established. Monster Hunter Tri gave Rathalos a heavier appearance and substantially increased the amount of time it spent airborne, reinforcing its characterization as a creature dominant in the air. Monster Hunter 4 added further aerial movements while introducing new vertical options that allowed hunters to counter its greater mobility.

Rathalos also served as one of the principal development models for Monster Hunter: World. In an interview originally published in Dengeki PlayStation, art director Kaname Fujioka said that Rathalos and Anjanath were used extensively while the team developed the basic movement and visual rules that would subsequently be applied to other monsters. The developers spent roughly a year establishing these foundations, with Rathalos being used to test movement, animation transitions and the production rules for flying wyverns. Rathalos was also placed at the apex of the Ancient Forest's ecosystem, reflecting the game's approach of designing fields and monsters together rather than as independent elements. For World, Rathalos itself was reconsidered as a living animal: Fujioka said that the designers considered how its body would change as it matured, differentiating harder and more flexible areas and giving its wing membranes greater movement and translucency.

Rathalos continued to be used as a visual reference during development of Monster Hunter Wilds. According to CGWORLD, early work to establish the game's graphical quality included rebuilding a close-up of Rathalos's eye from artwork created for the franchise's fifteenth anniversary. Developers extracted the relevant area from its World model and increased its detail, eventually using an 8K texture around the eye. The experiment helped establish a quality benchmark for subsequent creature production.

For the live-action Monster Hunter film, visual-effects artists began with Capcom's high-resolution Monster Hunter: World Rathalos model before adapting it for the greater detail required by film. The effects team developed an underlying skeleton and musculature and added detail to areas such as the mouth and eyes. Visual-effects supervisor Dennis Berardi said that hawks, eagles and falcons were studied as references for its movement. Rathalos was made larger than its game counterpart, partly to make its encounter with military aircraft visually credible. The team considered weight, drag and wind resistance when animating its flight and produced multiple versions of the model representing damage sustained during the film.

== Appearances ==
Rathalos has appeared throughout the main Monster Hunter series since the original game. It is typically depicted as a territorial flying wyvern that attacks from the air using fire and its claws. Several related forms have been introduced, including Azure Rathalos and Silver Rathalos, as well as Dreadking Rathalos in Monster Hunter Generations and Apex Rathalos in Monster Hunter Rise. In Monster Hunter: World, it is depicted as an apex predator of the Ancient Forest, while Rise allows hunters temporarily to control Rathalos through the game's Wyvern Riding system.

Rathalos has a more prominent narrative role in the Monster Hunter Stories role-playing game spin-offs, which allow players to raise monsters as companions. In the first game, the protagonist forms a bond with a Rathalos named Ratha. Monster Hunter Stories 2: Wings of Ruin similarly centres part of its story on a Rathalos known as Razewing Ratha.

The creature has also represented Monster Hunter in other video games. Rathalos appeared as a huntable monster in Metal Gear Solid: Peace Walker as part of a collaboration between Capcom and Konami. It was later added to Final Fantasy XIV in a crossover with Monster Hunter: World, appearing as a boss encounter. In Super Smash Bros. Ultimate, Rathalos appears as both a boss and an Assist Trophy, becoming the first character in the game to fulfil both roles.

== Reception and legacy ==
Rathalos has frequently been identified as one of the creatures most closely associated with the Monster Hunter franchise. In 2013, Game Informer described the monsters as the defining attraction of the series and characterized Rathalos as its most iconic creature, attributing its recognizability in part to its crimson appearance. Famitsu similarly described Rathalos in its 2025 retrospective as a flying wyvern symbolic of the series, noting its continuous presence as the franchise and its monster designs evolved.

Rich Stanton of The Guardian used Rathalos to illustrate the encounter design of Monster Hunter 4 Ultimate. He argued that fighting the monster rewarded learning its behaviour rather than merely repeating a memorized sequence, as Rathalos could vary combinations of attacks and transition between ground and aerial combat. The emphasis on flight has also attracted criticism. In coverage of Monster Hunter: World, PC Gamer described Rathalos as the red dragon serving as the face of the game but criticized an encounter in the game's beta because the monster frequently flew away or changed areas, requiring players to spend excessive time pursuing it. The different treatment of Rathalos in the Stories games has also attracted commentary. Reviewing Monster Hunter Stories 2, Gene Park of The Washington Post described Rathalos as the franchise's "banner creature" and contrasted the experience of raising one as a companion with the challenge of fighting it as a monster in the main series.

Rathalos itself has been the subject of analysis outside conventional game criticism. Media scholar Melissa Bianchi examined the monsters of Monster Hunter Rise like Rathalos collectively alongside New Pokémon Snap in the 2024 book Ecogames: Playful Perspectives on the Climate Crisis, analysing how both games encourage players to observe and document nonhuman creatures as representations of wildlife rather than solely as combat encounters. Bianchi considered these practices in relation to conventional divisions between humans and animals and to the player's ecological agency toward nonhuman life. In a 2023 paper in the University of Leicester's undergraduate journal Physics Special Topics, Alex Thompson, Jack Blase, Jordan Blue and Thomas Kelly investigated whether Rathalos could hover as depicted in Monster Hunter: World. Using estimates of its mass, wing dimensions and motion, they calculated the minimum wingbeat frequency required for hovering and compared it with the rate depicted in the game, concluding that the depicted Rathalos would fall slightly short of generating sufficient lift.

Rathalos's association with the franchise has resulted in its repeated use in crossovers and merchandise. Final Fantasy XIV director Naoki Yoshida said that Rathalos had made a strong impression on him when he fought it in the original Monster Hunter, influencing its selection for the collaboration between the two games. GameSpot referred to Rathalos as an unofficial mascot of Monster Hunter when reporting its inclusion in Super Smash Bros. Ultimate. For the franchise's twentieth anniversary, Fender produced a limited Rathalos-themed Telecaster, with Guitar.com describing the monster as one of the series' most iconic creatures.
