= Monster Hunter Stories 3: Twisted Reflection =

2026 video game

- Developer: Capcom
- Publisher: Capcom
- Composers: Kota Yokoseki; Marika Suzuki; Yuko Miyata; Akihiko Narita; Kodai Ikeda; Mizuki Kanno; (Note: Sari work as a vocalist of the credits theme.)
- Engine: RE Engine
- Platforms: Nintendo Switch 2; PlayStation 5; Windows; Xbox Series X/S
- Release: March 13, 2026
- Genre: Role-playing
- Mode: Single-player

Monster Hunter Stories 3: Twisted Reflection is a role-playing video game by Capcom. It is the third major entry in the Stories sub-series within the Monster Hunter franchise, following Monster Hunter Stories (2016) and Monster Hunter Stories 2 (2021). Announced in July 2025, it was released on March 13, 2026 for the Nintendo Switch 2, PlayStation 5, Windows, and Xbox Series X/S.

== Gameplay ==
The game plays as a JRPG, and retains a turn-based battle system like prior entries in the subseries.

== Story ==
The game follows two adversarial kingdoms of Azuria and Vermeil as they struggle to survive against an environmental disaster referred to as "Crystal Encroachment". The player controls the heir of Azuria as they team up with the princess of Vermail, Eleanor; to help both combat the threat and help relations between kingdoms. Eleanor is motivated to do this due to her concerns about the motivations of her sister, the Queen. The story will also be centered around the existence of a Rathalos, a recurring monster from the Monster Hunter series, which were said to be extinct.

== Development and release ==
The game was first announced on July 31, 2025, as part of a Nintendo Direct broadcast. It is the third entry of the Stories sub-series of Monster Hunter, following Monster Hunter Stories (2016) and Monster Hunter Stories 2 (2021). The game was released on March 13, 2026. While the original Nintendo Direct reveal only confirmed a Nintendo Switch 2 release date, publisher Capcom shortly after announced that the game would also be coming to PlayStation 5, Xbox Series X/S, and Windows via Steam.

== Reception ==
Reception

Aggregate scores
| Aggregator | Score |
|---|---|
| Metacritic | (NS2) 82/100 (PC) 87/100 (PS5) 86/100 (XSX) 86/100 |
| OpenCritic | 92% recommend (Note: Based on 126 reviews) |

The Nintendo Switch 2, PC, PlayStation 5, and Xbox Series X versions of Monster Hunter Stories 3: Twisted Reflection all received generally favorable reviews from critics, according to the review aggregation website Metacritic. Fellow review aggregator OpenCritic assessed that the game received "mighty" approval, being recommended by 92% of critics.

Screen Rant expressed hope that positive response to the game could help counter the negativity Monster Hunter Wilds encountered in user reviews earlier in 2025.

=== Awards ===
The game was nominated for "Best Role Playing Game" at The Game Awards 2026.
