= Monster Hunter Tri =

2009 video game

- Developer: Capcom Production Studio 1
- Publisher: Capcom
- Director: Kaname Fujioka
- Producer: Ryozo Tsujimoto
- Designers: Kent Kinoshita; Tsuyoshi Nagayama; Yuya Tokuda
- Composers: Yuko Komiyama; Tadayoshi Makino; Reo Uratani
- Series: Monster Hunter
- Engine: MT Framework Mobile
- Platforms: Wii; Nintendo 3DS; Wii U
- Release: Wii: JP: August 1, 2009; NA: April 20, 2010; EU: April 23, 2010; AU: April 29, 2010; 3DS & Wii U: JP: December 10, 2011 (3DS); JP: December 8, 2012 (Wii U); NA: March 19, 2013; EU: March 22, 2013; AU: March 23, 2013
- Genre: Action role-playing
- Modes: Single-player, multiplayer

Monster Hunter Tri (Note: Japanese: モンスターハンター3(トライ), Hepburn: Monsutā Hantā 3 (Torai); Monster Hunter 3 (tri-)), also known as Monster Hunter 3, is the third console installment in the Monster Hunter franchise, developed by Capcom and released for the Wii in Japan on August 1, 2009. This was released on April 20, 2010, in North America, April 23 in Europe, and April 29 in Australia.

The game was originally planned to be a PlayStation 3 title, but was cancelled due to high development costs for that console. Capcom instead decided to develop it for the Wii. Prior to its debut, a demo of Monster Hunter Tri was included with Japanese copies of Monster Hunter G. A special bundle was also released on August 1 featuring the game packaged with a black Wii console and a Classic Controller Pro. On August 3, 2009, Capcom issued a press release confirming the game would be localized for North American and European markets. On February 24, 2010, Capcom announced that online play would be provided free of charge. In America and Europe, separate servers are used and Wii Speak is supported, making the first game in the franchise to include native VoIP capability. It was a critical and commercial success. An enhanced port called Monster Hunter 3 (tri-) G in Japan and Monster Hunter 3 Ultimate in other territories was released for the Nintendo 3DS in Japan in December 2011 and in North America and Europe in March 2013. The online servers for the North American and European Wii versions of the game were shut down on April 30, 2013.

== Gameplay ==
Players of Monster Hunter Tri take on the role of a hunter from the hunting Guild, assigned to help Moga Village, a small fishing community that is under threat of monsters from a nearby deserted island. The player does this by completing free hunts on the island, where they collect materials and slay or capture monsters which are converted into resources that can be used to improve the village, and by completing time-limited quests for the Guild, typically slaying or capturing a monster in a specific region, for in-game money (zenny) and material resources that can be used to create equipment that allows them to take on more difficult monsters. Improving the village gives the player access to a farming area and a fishing fleet, from which herbs, mushrooms, bugs and honey can be harvested, companions that can help while on the field, and access to a trader that can provide rare items to the player.

The player's character has 1 base defence and can increase it by the armor created by the player. In particular, the player selects from one of ten weapon classes, primarily divided into melee weapons like swords and hammers, and ranged weapons like bows and bowguns. Each weapon type has a unique style of play when used in the field; sword users need to build up consecutive attacks to increase a combo meter to inflict larger damage on their foes but must keep an eye on their blade's sharpness, while bowmen can perform weak but fast ranged attacks including applying special coatings to their arrows to inflict debuffs on enemies. The player can also equip different sets of armor, which impart attack and defensive bonuses. Some weapons and armor include slots that gem decorations can be slotted into which boosts the item's statistics. Various armor pieces give special skill boosts, and if the player can equip a set that boosts a skill past set thresholds, they can gain additional passive bonuses such as full resistance to fire or poison attacks. The player can swap weapons and armor back in the village.

To progress in the game, the player is typically required to collect parts of the larger monsters that they are assigned to kill, and using those to forge or upgrade weapons and armor. By being able to take on higher-ranked Guild quests with improved equipment, the player will gain access to a larger array of monster parts and world resources that lead to better equipment they can then craft.

In the field, the player has a health and stamina meter (these max to 150 each), as well as an item pouch with limited space where resources like healing potions, bombs, and materials picked up in the field are stored. Certain materials can be combined to make more potent items, such as stronger healing potions. However, once the item pouch is full, the player must choose to discard or swap out items with new ones. As the player hunts, they will take damage from monsters; if their health drops to zero, they are rescued to a base camp where they can set off again, but after falling for a third time, they are returned to the village without any gains made while they were adventuring. The stamina meter drops after performing most intensive actions like running, dodging, or attacking, but restores when the player otherwise is walking around. When the player's stamina is depleted, the character will be forced to stop for a brief period to catch their breath before they can move, leaving them vulnerable to attack. In addition, the maximum stamina that the player has will drop over time while in the field, though certain items can restore the maximum stamina level. While on free hunts, the player can leave the field and return to the village at any time, keeping any items they have collected; on Quest hunts, failure to complete the mission in time or abandoning the quest foregoes any reward items.

Players with both the Nintendo 3DS and Wii U versions are able to transfer their character data back and forth between these units, allowing them to continue to build their character while on either system.

=== Online play ===
Monster Hunter on the Wii and Wii U offer an online component where up to 4 players can venture on new quests together, represented by the character traveling to a nearby city harbor port. The game uses the same character data as the single-player offering, letting players continue to build up better equipment from quest rewards within either mode. Quests in this mode featured more difficult monsters than the single player game due to the added players available to fight. Quests are broken out into a number of ranks, requiring players to individual completely all quests in a rank before moving to a new tier. A limited selection of the items that the player can collect can be traded with other players here or while on a quest, typically limited to healing and restorative items, preventing the trading of equipment, monster parts, or resources necessary to make better equipment.

The Wii version of online has since been shut down, but the Wii U version continued to offer these network servers until the shutdown of Nintendo Network in 2024, a decade after the shutdown of Nintendo Wi-Fi Connection.

== Development ==
The ecosystems in Monster Hunter Tri have been expanded to include underwater environments. Director Kaname Fujioka, in a 2017 interview, said that they wanted to include underwater sections and combat in Monster Hunter, both to try something different from what other games have done with this, and trying to see how underwater combat would work. While it was included in Tri, Fujioka said that the amount of effort they needed to program these sections took too much time away from what other parts they could develop, and generally have left underwater combat out of future Monster Hunter games, but would like to come back to it sometime in the future.

Eighteen new monsters were developed for the game, and while there were only 3 of the same boss monsters from the previous games (Rathalos, Rathian and Diablos), their interactive AI was completely redesigned. Each weapon class has been updated with new moves and innovations. Some Weapon Classes have been removed, probably due to short time while programming underwater battle for each weapon. The only ones that make it out to the final cut where, the Sword and Shield, Great Sword, Hammer, Bowguns (Light and Heavy) Lance, Longsword, and the new Switch Axe, which can switch between Axe and Sword forms. According to producer Tsujimoto Ryozo, "[Capcom] love the idea of voice chat and know that it is a minimum for western players," which suggested Western releases of Monster Hunter Tri may feature support for the Wii Speak microphone peripheral, which was later confirmed. Two special bundles of the game were announced. One bundle for North America and Europe includes a black Classic Controller Pro. A European-exclusive bundle includes a Wii Speak device and Classic Controller Pro. GameStop has offered a demo disc of the game free of charge in North America. GAME has officially confirmed a European Monster Hunter Tri: Exclusive Edition bundle containing the game, Wii Speak, a black Classic Controller Pro and one other item which appears to be an ornamental head of the monster which appears on the game's cover art, the Lagiacrus.

== Monster Hunter 3 Ultimate ==
Monster Hunter 3 Ultimate is a game for the Nintendo 3DS and Wii U. The game is similar to Monster Hunter Portable 3rd. The 3DS version was released on December 10, 2011 in Japan as Monster Hunter Tri G (Note: Japanese: モンスターハンター3(トライ)G, Hepburn: Monsutā Hantā Torai G; Monster Hunter 3 (tri-) G) and features local wireless play. In Japan, Famitsu announced that Monster Hunter Tri G was confirmed as an expanded Monster Hunter Tri. It is the first game to support the Circle Pad Pro add-on. The game was also released in two bundles, one containing the special edition 3DS and the other one containing the add-on. It was also released on Wii U which features revised HD graphics, full online, local multiplayer, and the ability to import the game progress to the player's Nintendo 3DS. The Wii U port is known in Japan as Monster Hunter 3G HD Ver., and was released on December 8, 2012 when the Wii U launched in Japan, while the Nintendo 3DS version was re-released as a Nintendo eShop downloadable two days prior, featuring a slightly lower price than the retail re-release. It was announced that Tri G would be released in North America and Europe as Monster Hunter 3 Ultimate, and would be released in March 2013 together for both the Nintendo 3DS and the Wii U. Monster Hunter 4 for the 3DS was also announced, which originally scheduled to be released in Japan in the same month as Monster Hunter 3 Ultimate in North America and Europe, but later pushed back to Summer 2013. It was later announced that the North American and European releases would be on March 19 and 22 respectively. A demo of the game was released on February 21, 2013.

=== Gameplay ===
Monster Hunter 3 Ultimate re-introduces the underwater combat that was left out of the Japanese-only sequel to Tri, Monster Hunter Portable 3rd. This is the first time that the Gunlance, Bow, Hunting Horn and Dual Blades have been featured in underwater combat. The game also reintroduces G-Rank, a level above high rank that features a new set of quests, harder monsters and improved weapons and armor. It was the first time G-Rank was present in a Monster Hunter game since Monster Hunter Freedom Unite, and the first time for a third generation Monster Hunter title. It also feature a different online hub, which is an island district named "Tanzia Port". Unlike the "Loc Lac City" from Tri, it doesn't require the player to be online to access the hub, allowing players to complete the quests on their own.

== Reception ==
Reception

Aggregate score
Aggregator	Score		
Aggregator	3DS	Wii	Wii U
Metacritic	79/100	84/100	82/100

Review scores
Publication	Score		
Publication	3DS	Wii	Wii U
Destructoid	N/A	9/10	9/10
Edge	N/A	7/10	8/10
Electronic Gaming Monthly	7.5/10	N/A	N/A
Eurogamer	N/A	9/10	9/10
Famitsu	N/A	40/40	N/A
Game Informer	N/A	7/10	8.75/10
GamePro	N/A	4/5	N/A
GameRevolution	N/A	B+	4/5
GameSpot	7/10	8/10	8/10
GameTrailers	N/A	8.4/10	8.5/10
IGN	8.8/10	(AU) 9.5/10 (UK) 9.3/10 (US) 8.8/10	8.8/10
Nintendo Power	N/A	9/10	N/A
Polygon	N/A	N/A	7.5/10
The Daily Telegraph	N/A	N/A	4/5
The Escapist	N/A	4/5	4/5

The game and the Ultimate versions received "favorable reviews" on all platforms according to video game review aggregator Metacritic. In Japan, Weekly Famitsu certified the Wii version with a score of 40/40, making it the eleventh game to receive a perfect rating from the magazine in its 20-year history, as well as the third title for the Wii.

411Mania gave the Wii version a score of 8.8 out of 10 and called it "a meaty experience, with the same addictive reward system that forms the core of many MMORPGs. If you have a few friends who also enjoy the game, you'll enjoy hours and hours of hunting together. Even if you prefer to play offline, there's a ton to do. Unfortunately, while fans of the series will probably love Monster Hunter Tri, Capcom has a lot of kinks to iron out if they want to appeal to the Western masses." The A.V. Club gave it a B+ and stated that "The underlying complexities of crafting nifty new gear from their bones is the reason to put roots in Monster Hunter Tri's wooly world." The Escapist gave it a score of four stars out of five and stated, "For some reason, there is something uniquely satisfying about felling a great beast and wearing his skin in triumph."

The Digital Fix gave the Wii U version a score of nine out of ten and said it "could very well be the best reason to own a Wii U at this early stage in the console's life. The reduced difficulty in the single player mode helps with easing in new players into the core game systems while the higher rank missions will keep veteran monster slayers satisfied. Beyond the addition of new monsters and one new location to hunt in the central game mechanics remain largely unchanged from Tri or indeed the rest of the series." National Post gave the same version of Ultimate a score of 8.5 out of 10 and stated that "The bigger screen and 1080p HD graphics do add to the flair of the game — the textures are redone for the more powerful Wii U, while most of the game models are the same — but no one would mistake them for something that wasn't also designed to be played on a handheld. The framerate is much better and, most importantly, you can play online with other players." However, the newspaper also gave the 3DS version a score of 7 out of 10, saying, "On the 3DS, your only option is local play. This means that every player needs to have a 3DS, a copy of the game and be in the same room with one another, or be in the same room as someone with the Wii U version of the game. [...] This very limited multiplayer, the lack of a second camera-controlling analog stick (without the circle-pad-pro add-on) and small almost illegible text is why the 3DS version of the game has a lower score than the Wii U version." The Daily Telegraph gave the Wii U version a score of four stars out of five and stated, "The Monster Hunter series continues to be brilliant but a little impenetrable, despite efforts to remedy that very issue. How much you'll get out of the game really depends on what you're willing to put in - if you're short on spare time or patience, maybe give it a miss. But if you like the sound of really learning a game for once instead of just drifting through it, Monster Hunter 3 Ultimate is essential." Digital Spy gave the same version a score of four stars out of five and said, "With some truly breathtaking battles, great online play and the promise of free challenges to come, Monster Hunter 3: Ultimate is just what Nintendo's fledgling console needs." The Escapist also gave it four stars out of five, saying, "While grinding and idiosyncrasies will get to some, Monster Hunter 3 Ultimate is a great game. It shines particularly bright when played [in] multiplayer."

Monster Hunter Tri shipped over one million units prior to its Japanese release date. It was the top-selling game in Japan for the week ending August 2, 2009, at 520,000 copies sold. As of December 12, 2009, Monster Hunter Tri is the best-selling third-party video game for the Wii in Japan, at 960,000 copies sold. As of June 30, 2012, over 1.9 million copies have been sold on the Wii. As of December 31, 2015, 2.6 million copies have been sold on the 3DS.
