= Monster Hunter Outlanders =

Upcoming mobile game

- Developer: TiMi Studio Group
- Publishers: Level Infinite; Garena (Southeast Asia)
- Series: Monster Hunter
- Engine: Unreal Engine 5
- Platforms: iOS, Android
- Release: October 29, 2026
- Genre: Action role-playing
- Modes: Single-player, multiplayer

Monster Hunter Outlanders is a mobile game in the Monster Hunter series. It is being developed by TiMi Studio Group under license from Capcom. The game has action role-playing elements, built around exploration, hunting, crafting and cooperative play. The game launched on October 29, 2026.

== Gameplay ==
Monster Hunter Outlanders is intended to adapt elements of the main Monster Hunter games for mobile devices. The game is described as combining exploration, hunting and crafting with social and live-service features associated with mobile games. It supports solo play and cooperative multiplayer for up to four players.

The game is set on Aesoland, an island inhabited by Radiant species, monsters whose appearance and abilities have been altered by a mineral called Radiantite. Players control Adventurers with individual abilities, explore different ecosystems, craft facilities and use clues found in the environment to progress through hunts. Information released for the third closed beta stated that the test would include new radiant monsters and additional adventurers added after the second closed beta held in May 2026.

== Development ==
Capcom announced on November 9, 2022, that it was co-developing a Monster Hunter smartphone game for iOS and Android with TiMi Studio Group. At the time, Capcom said that details on the game and its release timing would be announced later.

The title Monster Hunter Outlanders was announced in November 2024. The Verge reported that the game was being developed by TiMi, known for mobile titles including Call of Duty: Mobile and Pokémon Unite, and that several playtests were planned before launch. Google Play later listed the game as licensed by Capcom, developed by TiMi Studio Group and published by Level Infinite.

A second closed beta registration period opened in April 2026, with the test planned for iOS and Android devices. Registration for a third closed beta opened on July 2, 2026, and was scheduled to run until July 24, with the test itself beginning on August 7. The third test was announced for iOS and Android in Japan, the United States, Canada, Germany, the United Kingdom, France and the Philippines.
