= Akihiko Narita =

Japanese video game composer (born 1980)

- 成田 暁彦
- Born: April 6, 1980 (age 46); Japan
- Occupation: Music composer
- Years active: 2005–present
- Employer: Capcom

Akihiko Narita (成田 暁彦, Narita Akihiko) (born April 6, 1980) is a Japanese video game composer. He is employed by Capcom. Narita is notable for working on a few games from the Monster Hunter franchise and Resident Evil 5. He led the music team of Resident Evil 6.

== Discography ==
- Monster Hunter Freedom (2005) – with Masato Kohda and Yuko Komiyama.
- Monster Hunter 2 (Dos) (2006) – with Masato Kohda, Yuko Komiyama, Shinya Okada and Hajime Hyakkoku.
- Lost Planet: Extreme Condition (2006) - with Shuji Uchiyama.
- Monster Hunter Freedom 2 (2007) – with Masato Kohda and Yuko Komiyama.
- Devil May Cry 4 (2008) - with Tetsuya Shibata, Kento Hasegawa, Masami Ueda, Shusaku Uchiyama, Kota Suzuki, Rei Kondoh, CHAMY.Ishi, Shinichiro Sato.
- Resident Evil 5 (2009) - with Kota Suzuki, Hideki Okugawa and Seiko Kobuchi.
- Resident Evil 6 (2012) - with Akiyuki Morimoto, Azusa Kato, Kota Suzuki, Thomas Parisch and Laurent Ziliani, Daniel Lindholm, Sebastian Schwartz.
- Monster Hunter: World (2018) - with Zhenlan Kang, Yuko Komiyama, Masato Kouda, Tadayoshi Makino.
