= Monster Hunter Dynamic Hunting =

2011 mobile video game

- Developer: Capcom
- Publisher: Capcom
- Series: Monster Hunter
- Platforms: iOS, Android
- Release: WW: June 1, 2011
- Genre: Fighting
- Modes: Single-player, multiplayer

Monster Hunter Dynamic Hunting is a fighting game developed and published by Capcom for iOS and Android. It was released on June 1, 2011. It is a spin-off of the action adventure game series Monster Hunter, and features both single-player and cooperative multiplayer modes of gameplay.

== Reception ==
Reception

Aggregate score
Aggregator	Score
Metacritic	69/100

Review score
Publication	Score
Pocket Gamer	2.5/5

Monster Hunter Dynamic Hunting received "mixed or average" reviews, according to review aggregator Metacritic.

Pocket Gamer lamented the unfairness of the game due to poor controls, writing, "The rare periods where everything comes together demonstrate that this could have been a perfectly playable (if not entirely original) hack and slash sim, filled with a bevy of creatures worth your time."
