= Monster Hunter Diary =

2010 video game

Monster Hunter Diary: Poka Poka Airou Village
- Japanese PlayStation Portable cover art
- Developer: FromSoftware
- Publisher: Capcom
- Composer: Yuji Takenouchi
- Series: Monster Hunter
- Platforms: PlayStation Portable, Nintendo 3DS
- Release: PlayStation Portable: JP: August 26, 2010; PlayStation Portable (G): JP: August 10, 2011; Nintendo 3DS (DX): JP: September 10, 2015
- Genre: Adventure
- Modes: Single-player, multiplayer

Monster Hunter Diary: Poka Poka Airou Village is a spin-off installment in the Monster Hunter series, developed by FromSoftware and published by Capcom for the PlayStation Portable. It was released in Japan on August 26, 2010. The word "airou" is the Japanese equivalent of felyne (Ailuro is the Greek word for cat). The player gives orders to the felynes to progress to the end of quests instead of having direct control over them. The game uses a more cartoonish art style as opposed to the more realistic style seen in the main Monster Hunter games. More emphasis is placed on style and village management. A few Hello Kitty items are also available in the game.

Monster Hunter Diary Poka Poka Airou Village G is an expansion pack and was released in August 2011. Monster Hunter Diary Giri Giri Airou Village is a series of ten television shorts developed to help advertise Poka Poka Airou Village. They feature felynes attempting quests and almost invariably failing at them. One episode also has a Chibiterasu cameo. A Nintendo 3DS version of the game, titled Monster Hunter Diary: Poka Poka Airou Village DX was released in Japan in 2015.
