= Monster Hunter Portable 3rd =

2010 video game

- Developer: Capcom
- Publisher: Capcom
- Director: Yasunori Ichinose
- Producer: Ryozo Tsujimoto
- Series: Monster Hunter
- Platform: PlayStation Portable PlayStation 3
- Release: PlayStation Portable: JP: December 1, 2010; PlayStation 3: JP: August 25, 2011
- Genre: Action role-playing
- Modes: Single-player, multiplayer

Monster Hunter Portable 3rd (Note: Japanese: モンスターハンターポータブル3rd, Hepburn: Monsutā Hantā Pōtaburu 3rd; Monster Hunter Portable 3rd) is a 2010 action role-playing game developed and published by Capcom for the PlayStation Portable. It is the third handheld installment in the Monster Hunter franchise. Like its predecessor, Monster Hunter Freedom 2, Portable 3rd is an original title that adapts the core content of Monster Hunter Tri into a new single player campaign, adding supplemental original content. The game introduces regions, monsters, and a revised Felyne combat system.

A high definition remaster, the first of Sony's "PSP Remasters" series for the PlayStation 3, was released in Japan on August 25, 2011. The remaster's features include enhanced HD graphics, 3D support and shared save support with the PSP.

== Gameplay ==
As with previous installments, the player takes the role of the titular monster hunter, sent from the hunters guild to Yukumo village (Japanese : ユクモ村) to undertake quests which range from slaying creatures to harvesting/gathering different items. The player starts with weapons and armor that is given to new hunters, but is able to craft better equipment by using the materials obtained from mining, gathering and carving slain monsters.

Quests are divided into two main branches, villages quests obtained from the village chief and guild quests from the hunting guild hall. There are also additional quests given by the drink vendor to expand the menu of drink players can purchase to apply a buff before a hunt, as well as Downloadable Content quests.

== Reception ==
Famitsu gave the PSP version a score of two tens, one nine, and one ten, for an almost-perfect score of 39 out of 40.

== Sales ==
The game was number one in the Japanese sales chart of 5 December 2010, replacing Gran Turismo 5. Within two weeks of release by December 20, Monster Hunter Portable 3rd sold 2.58 million units in Japan. According to the game's publisher, Monster Hunter Portable 3rd was "now the fastest selling PSP title ever in Japan" and "the fastest selling game in Capcom's history." By June 2011, the game's sales in Japan had reached 4.8 million units, making it one of the best-selling PSP games.
