= Auto Modellista =

2002 video game

- European PlayStation 2 version cover art featuring a Mazda RX-7
- Developer: Capcom Production Studio 1
- Publisher: Capcom
- Director: Hideaki Itsuno
- Producer: Yoshihiro Sudou
- Designers: Tatsuya Nakae; Shinichirō Obata; Ryozo Tsujimoto; Keni Kinoshita
- Composers: Tetsuya Shibata; Isao Abe
- Platforms: PlayStation 2, GameCube, Xbox
- Release: PlayStation 2: JP: August 22, 2002; EU: December 6, 2002; NA: March 25, 2003; JP: September 11, 2003 (US Tuned); GameCube: JP: July 3, 2003 (US Tuned); NA: September 30, 2003; Xbox: NA: January 20, 2004; JP: January 29, 2004 (US Tuned)
- Genre: Arcade style racing
- Modes: Single-player, multiplayer

Auto Modellista (Note: Auto Modellista (アウトモデリスタ, Auto Moderisuta), Rough Italian for "car collector".) is a racing game developed and published by Capcom, first released on PlayStation 2, later ported to GameCube and Xbox.

== Description ==
Auto Modellista distinguished itself from other games of the same genre with cel-shaded graphics, which gave a hand-drawn and cartoon-like appearance. The game plays similarly to games like Gran Turismo, with the player picking a vehicle which they can modify and customize. There are six tracks in the default game, including the real-life Suzuka Circuit and the Mt. Akagi mountain pass.

After middling initial reception, with criticism mostly centered around its short overall length and general lack of content, Capcom modified the game for its North American release. In Japan, the game was rereleased with these changes as Auto Modellista: US Tuned. This version featured additional cars from American manufacturers, such as the Dodge Viper and Ford GT, two new oval tracks, various UI improvements and a different handling model which saw cars having significantly less grip, resulting in slower acceleration and more loss of speed when cornering.

== Gameplay ==
Described as "half and half arcade and simulation" by producer Yoshishiro Sudoi, Auto Modellista is a racing game with an immense amount of available parts and settings for the selection of cars provided to the player. Various aspects of each car can be tuned, allowing the player to tweak the performance of the car.

In the Garage mode (the main single-player mode), the player is granted the ability to select one of four tire types which affect road grip in regard to the weather conditions on the race track (for example, the "Semi-Slick Tires" provide maximum speed and grip in dry weather, but suffer in rain). Other options include Brakes (which determine braking efficiency), Suspension, Turbines, Mufflers, Computer (determines the car's ability to accept upgrades later in the game), the engine, "Final Gear", and Weight Reduction.

Auto Modellista's customization options also extend to visual enhancements, allowing the player to choose from many different color combinations, hood and spoiler types, plus the ability to add badges, stickers and even create license plates. Engine swaps are also available, for example, the Subaru 360 can have EJ20T in place of its EK32. Swapped engines cannot be re-tuned in the game.

A large aspect of the game was its online mode, with online races supporting up to 8 players. This functionality was not available on the GameCube and European PlayStation 2 versions. The official online mode of Auto Modellista has since been discontinued however, Auto Modellista is now playable online again on the revival Xbox Live servers called Insignia.

== Development ==
Auto Modellista was a part of an initiative from Capcom's Production Studio 1 to develop three network focused games on the PlayStation 2. The other games were Monster Hunter and Resident Evil Outbreak. Capcom's plan was that at least one of the games would become a million seller. Both Monster Hunter and Resident Evil Outbreak eventually became million sellers.

== Reception ==
Reception

Aggregate score
Aggregator	Score		
Aggregator	GameCube	PS2	Xbox
Metacritic	62/100	66/100	52/100

Review scores
Publication	Score		
Publication	GameCube	PS2	Xbox
Edge	N/A	4/10	N/A
Electronic Gaming Monthly	N/A	5.83/10	N/A
Eurogamer	N/A	4/10	N/A
Famitsu	N/A	30/40	N/A
Game Informer	N/A	8/10	7/10
GamePro	N/A	3.5/5	N/A
GameRevolution	N/A	B−	N/A
GameSpot	6.2/10	6.9/10	6.8/10
GameSpy	N/A	1/5	2/5
GameZone	N/A	8.9/10	N/A
IGN	5.5/10	7/10	5.7/10
Nintendo Power	3.7/5	N/A	N/A
Official U.S. PlayStation Magazine	N/A	2.5/5	N/A
Official Xbox Magazine (US)	N/A	N/A	5.5/10

Awards
Publication	Award
E3 2002 Game Critics Awards	Best Racing Game
GameSpot E3 2002	Best Game, Top Game

The game received "mixed or average reviews" on all platforms according to video game review aggregator website Metacritic. In Japan, Famitsu gave the PS2 version a score of 30 out of 40.

Auto Modellista has in the years following its release garnered somewhat of a cult following, with players especially praising its unique cel-shaded graphics.
