= Monster Hunter Stories =

2016 video game

- Japanese cover art
- Developers: Capcom; Marvelous
- Publishers: Nintendo 3DS: JP: Capcom; WW: Nintendo; Android, iOS, Switch, PS4, Windows: WW: Capcom
- Director: Kenji Oguro
- Producers: Hironobu Takeshita; Hiroshi Ito; Natsuki Shiozawa; Akihito Kadowaki
- Designer: Yugo Togawa
- Programmers: Toshihiko Honda; Masato Inamochi
- Artist: Takahiro Kawano
- Writers: Kenji Oguro; Kaname Fujioka; Tomoyuki Hosokawa; Manami Oishi
- Composers: Marika Suzuki; Hiromitsu Maeba
- Series: Monster Hunter
- Platforms: Nintendo 3DS; Android; iOS; Nintendo Switch; PlayStation 4; Windows; Xbox One
- Release: Nintendo 3DS: JP: October 8, 2016; EU: September 8, 2017; NA: September 8, 2017; AU: September 9, 2017; Android, iOS: JP: December 4, 2017; WW: September 25, 2018; Switch, PS4, Windows: WW: June 14, 2024; Xbox One: WW: November 14, 2025
- Genre: Role-playing
- Modes: Single-player, multiplayer

Monster Hunter Stories (Note: Japanese: モンスターハンター ストーリーズ, Hepburn: Monsutā Hantā Sutōrīzu) is a role-playing video game developed by Capcom and Marvelous and published by Nintendo for the Nintendo 3DS. It is a spinoff title in the Monster Hunter series and features a drastically different gameplay focus. Unlike previous titles in the franchise, Monster Hunter Stories lets players take on the role of a Rider instead of a Hunter, and are able to take part in a traditional turn-based battle system. Major changes and additions featured in this title include hatching eggs and befriending monsters, battling alongside them, executing special kinship techniques, and customizing monsters' abilities and appearance. The game was released in Japan on October 8, 2016, and in North America, Europe and Australia in September 2017. Later, a high-definition mobile version of the game was released on December 4, 2017, in Japan and September 25, 2018, worldwide. The Nintendo 3DS version includes support for Amiibo figures, with a first set launching alongside the game, and a second set launching two months later. An anime series Monster Hunter Stories: Ride On is a loose adaptation of this game, and the sequel Monster Hunter Stories 2: Wings of Ruin was released in 2021.

== Gameplay ==
Monster Hunter Stories features a completely new gameplay structure compared to the previous titles in the series. The player assumes the role of a Rider who befriends monsters by stealing eggs and hatching them. The player then has the ability to name their companion monsters, or "Monsties", ride them around in the overworld, and have them join the player in battles. The player will be able to explore different environments, encounter monsters in the field, battle them, collect items and steal eggs from monsters' nests.

Unlike most games in the franchise, Monster Hunter Stories features a more traditional turn-based battle system. During the player's turn, both the rider and their monsters will get to attack the enemy. Attacks for both the player and the enemy come in three types: Power, Speed, and Technical. Each category is stronger against one in particular in a rock-paper-scissors fashion: Power will win against Technical, Technical will win against Speed, and Speed will win against Power. When an enemy monster is targeting someone and that character attempts to attack them, a Head-to-Head will occur which pits their two attack types against each other, with the dominant attack type prevailing in the exchange. If the player and their monster both use the same attack type while the enemy is targeting someone and have the type advantage, they will unleash a Double Attack and prevent the enemy from retaliating altogether. Winning battles will award the player with experience points and item drops. Beyond the main story, the player can engage in sidequests, called subquests, which provide items and experience points upon completion.

The player only has a choice of four weapons from the core series to use in battle, those being the Great Sword, the Sword & Shield, the Hammer, and the Hunting Horn. The player will have access to different skills depending on the weapon and equipment they use, and the player will also be able to use items in battle. Companion monsters can be customized with the Rite of Channeling feature, in which the player can transfer Bond Genes into a monster's slots in order to unlock and awaken their stats and abilities. This allows for further customization and adjustment to the player's play style. The game features multiplayer battles via local or Internet connection. The Nintendo 3DS version is also compatible with Amiibo figures, with the figures from the Monster Hunter Stories line of Amiibo unlocking original and special monsters, among other bonuses.

== Plot ==
The game starts with the main character, whose gender can be selected by the player, and their friends, Cheval and Lilia, looking for a monster egg. They find a nest with one, which hatches into a Rathalos that bonds with the protagonist immediately. They nickname the creature Ratha. Upon their return to Hakum Village, a Nargacuga afflicted with a sickness called the Black Blight attacks. Ratha tries to defend the village, but is seemingly killed. Cheval's mother dies in the attack.

A year later, the village has recovered, but the threat of the Black Blight still remains. The main character takes the Rite of Kinship and is gifted by the village chief with a piece of Kinship Ore, a crystal with the power to tame wild monsters almost instantaneously. They then gain the title of Rider, which is unique to their village. They also meet a strange-looking wild felyne, who names himself Navirou and demands to accompany them. Traveling outside the village to tame monsters, they soon come across the Black Blight, which they are able to purify by using their Kinship Ore to resonate with a larger, natural formation of the mineral.

Lilia decides to join the Royal Scriveners, a group studying the Black Blight, while Cheval tames a Rathian and becomes fixated on slaying blighted monsters to get his revenge. Meanwhile, the protagonist continues to purify the Blight. Eventually, they encounter a mad scientist, named Doctor Manelger, who is attempting to create artificial Kinship Ore and bend monsters to his will. The main character reunites with Ratha, who is revealed to have survived the attack and flies to Manelger's laboratory, rescuing many kidnapped felyne slaves, as well as the Numbers, felyne test subjects of which Navirou was formerly a member.

To stop the Black Blight, the protagonist decides to look for the egg of a legendary white dragon, Versa Pietru that was once tamed by the very first rider, Redan. They find the egg, but it is stolen by Manelger. Manelger gives the egg to Cheval, who is wielding the artificial ore and the creature hatches and immediately grows to an enormous size. Cheval loses control of the creature which becomes infected with the Black Blight, turning into Makili Pietru. Cheval finally realizes his foolishness, and the protagonist rushes to defeat Makili Pietru before it can infect the entire world. Ratha's Blight, transmitted from a wound inflicted by the Nargacuga that attacked the village a year back, suddenly manifests and the player must defeat Ratha first. After Ratha comes to his senses, they face off against Makili Pietru.

After a long battle, the player and Ratha use Sky-High-Dive to try to finish off the Makili Pietru. During this time, Ratha is engulfed in a bright white light and empowered by Navirou to defeat the Makili Pietru, revealing that Ratha was actually the White Dragon all along.

== Development ==
Series executive producer Ryozo Tsujimoto stated that the idea for a role-playing video game in the Monster Hunter universe was a response to players' interests in the world's setting and livelihood of the monsters and that these concepts were thought of since 2010. The reasoning behind the switch from the Hunter role to a Rider one was to give the spotlight to the monsters, along with the idea of petting them and seeing things from their point of view.

== Release ==
Monster Hunter Stories was announced in Japan in April 2015 at the "Monster Hunter Fest '15 Finals" event by Capcom with a planned release in 2016. A demo of the game was released digitally in Japan on September 20, 2016, via the Nintendo eShop. The demo features two game modes: "Quest Mode", which allows the player to play part of the story, and "Tournament Mode", which lets the player partake in Rider battles. The game was subsequently released for Nintendo 3DS in Japan on October 8, 2016 and internationally the following year.

The game was subsequently ported to iOS and Android devices with improved graphics, an updated user interface, and other features. The mobile version launched in Japan in late 2017 and reached Western markets by September 2018. A remastered version of the title was released for Windows, PlayStation 4, and Nintendo Switch on June 14, 2024, alongside the PS4 port of its sequel, Wings of Ruin. Xbox One versions of both games were released on November 14, 2025.

Similar to previous Monster Hunter games, the player can obtain armor, items, and clothing themed to other franchises through collaborations. Stories has items based on Puzzle & Dragons X, Chibi Maruko-chan, Shōnen Jump, and The Legend of Zelda, the last of which is exclusive to the Nintendo 3DS version.

== Reception ==
Reception

Aggregate scores
Aggregator	Score
Metacritic	3DS: 79/100
OpenCritic	77% recommend(Remaster)

Review scores
Publication	Score
Destructoid	7/10
Game Informer	8/10
IGN	8.9/10
Nintendo Life	9/10
Nintendo World Report	8/10
TouchArcade	4.5/5

On its first week of launch, according to 4Gamer.net and Media Create, Monster Hunter Stories sold 140,603 copies, making it the top-selling title of the week of October 3 through October 9, 2016.

=== Accolades ===
The game was nominated for "Best Handheld Game" at The Game Awards 2017, and for "Best 3DS Game" and "Best RPG" at IGN's Best of 2017 Awards. It was also nominated for "Handheld Game of the Year" at the 21st Annual D.I.C.E. Awards.

== Sequels ==
A sequel for Nintendo Switch and Microsoft Windows, Monster Hunter Stories 2: Wings of Ruin featuring a new cast of characters and an original story was released on July 9, 2021. A third title, Monster Hunter Stories 3: Twisted Reflection was released on March 13, 2026, for Nintendo Switch 2, PlayStation 5, Xbox Series X/S and Windows.
