= Monster Hunter 2 =

2006 video game

Monster Hunter Dos
- Developer: Capcom
- Publisher: Capcom
- Director: Kaname Fujioka
- Designers: Keni Kinoshita; Tsuyoshi Nagayama; Shintaro Kojima
- Composers: Masato Kohda; Yuko Komiyama; Akihiko Narita
- Series: Monster Hunter
- Platform: PlayStation 2
- Release: JP: February 16, 2006
- Genre: Action role-playing
- Modes: Single-player, multiplayer

Monster Hunter 2 (Note: Japanese: モンスターハンター2 (ドス), Hepburn: Monsutā Hantā 2 (Dosu); lit. Monster Hunter 2 (dos)), also known as Monster Hunter Dos, is a 2006 action role-playing game developed and published by Capcom for the PlayStation 2. The second main installment of the Monster Hunter franchise, it was released in Japan in February 2006. The game features additions such as a day-night cycle, inclusion of seasons, monsters and weapon types that would eventually become mainstays such as the Long Sword and Hunting Horn. An English-language fan translation was released in 2023.

== Gameplay ==
Monster Hunter 2's gameplay follows closely with the preceding games as well as introducing several additions. The player's character can embark on quests involving hunting large or small monsters and gathering; the rewards gained from completing quests are used to forge weapons and armor.

Monster Hunter 2 has an improved weapon tree and upgradeable armor. Monster Hunter games, armor pieces can be worn to obtain skills and abilities. A new feature in Monster Hunter 2 is the use of gems. Gems add skill points to complement those added by armor and weapons. Gems are created by combining ore and/or monster parts. Gems can be attached and detached from armor and weapons that have special gem slots.

== Reception ==
Monster Hunter 2 received generally positive reviews from Japan-based Famitsu magazine receiving a score of 37/40 from the publication.

Reception

Review score
Publication	Score
Famitsu	37/40

== Related games ==
Monster Hunter Freedom 2, released in Japan as Monster Hunter Portable 2nd, is a partial port of Monster Hunter 2 for the PSP. Monster Hunter Freedom 2 adds features and includes several changes to the original game.
