= Monster Hunter =

Video game series and its franchise created by Capcom

- Logo for Monster Hunter
- Genre: Action role-playing
- Developer: Capcom
- Publisher: Capcom
- Creator: Kaname Fujioka
- Platforms: PlayStation 2, PlayStation 3, PlayStation 4, PlayStation 5, PlayStation Portable, PlayStation Vita, Windows, Wii, Wii U, Xbox 360, Xbox One, Xbox Series X/S, Nintendo 3DS, Nintendo Switch, Nintendo Switch 2, Android, iOS
- First release: Monster Hunter; March 11, 2004
- Latest release: Monster Hunter Wilds; February 28, 2025

Monster Hunter (モンスターハンター, Monsutā Hantā) is a Japanese media franchise centered on a series of fantasy-themed action role-playing video games, beginning with the first installment Monster Hunter for the PlayStation 2, released in 2004. The series has been released on multiple platforms, including personal computers, home consoles, portable consoles, and mobile devices. The series is developed and published by Capcom.

The games are primarily action role-playing games. The player takes the role of a Hunter, slaying or trapping large monsters across various landscapes as part of quests given to them by locals, with some quests involving the gathering of a certain item or items, which may put the Hunter at risk of facing various monsters. As part of its core gameplay loop, players use loot gained from slaying monsters, gathering resources, and quest rewards to craft improved weapons, armor, and other items that allow them to face more powerful monsters. All main series titles feature multiplayer (usually up to four players cooperatively), but can also be played single player.

Early Monster Hunter games sold well in Japan and other Asian countries, popularized by the series' use of ad hoc multiplayer features on portable consoles, and became a cultural phenomenon. The early games in the series have been critically well received in Western markets, but generally languished in sales, in part due to the games' steep learning curve. However, with Monster Hunter: World (2018), Capcom aimed to attract a global audience using the power of advanced home gaming consoles and computers and released the title simultaneously worldwide. World became the best-selling Monster Hunter game within three days of its release, and became Capcom's single best-selling video game of all time with 21 million sales as of July 5, 2022, including more than 70% outside of Japan. By May 2024, the series has sold more than 100 million units, with nearly half attributed to Monster Hunter: World and Monster Hunter Rise and their expansions. The 2025 entry, Monster Hunter Wilds, the first in the series to release worldwide and all platforms simultaneously, became the fastest selling Capcom game within three days of release. The Monster Hunter series has currently sold more than 131 million units as of July 2026.

Games in the Monster Hunter are generally catalogued as either part of the mainline series aimed for console players, and portable versions for hand held consoles. A number of spinoff games featuring different gameplay genres have also been developed for consoles, computers, and mobile devices. In addition to games, the franchise has an anime based on the spinoff game Monster Hunter Diary: Poka Poka Airou Village, Monster Hunter Stories: Ride On based on the spinoff title Monster Hunter Stories, a manga, Monster Hunter Orage, and a book, Monster Hunter Episode. A feature film directed by Paul W. S. Anderson was released on December 3, 2020.

An animated film, subtitled Legends of the Guild, was released on August 12, 2021, on Netflix.

== Gameplay ==
The main Monster Hunter games are action games taking place in a common fantasy world set some thousands of years after the collapse of an advanced civilization. While there are centers of civilization that remain and flourish, parts of the world remain unsettled due to the presence of monsters that threaten any attempts to settle in these areas. The player takes the role of a Hunter, assigned by the Hunters' Guild to help protect these remote areas by hunting down the monsters, typically alongside the work of a research team that is trying to understand the origin and behavior of these monsters. The player, as the Hunter, uses a variety of weapons and tools, along with the environment itself, to fight against the monsters.

The core feature of Monster Hunter is its compulsion loop. Unlike traditional computer role-playing games, a player's Hunter does not grow and has no intrinsic statistics or attributes whatsoever. Rather, the Hunter's abilities are instead defined by the specific weapons and armor selected. The player can equip weapons, armor, and items most beneficial towards completing a given mission, and if successful, the Hunter is awarded in both in-game money ("zenny") and loot representing parts from the monster. These parts, along with other resources collected while on missions and/or through mission rewards, can be used to forge or upgrade new weapons and armor which then can be used in against more powerful monsters and tackle more difficult missions, completing the compulsion loop. Harder missions are typically restricted by a hunter's rank, which cumulatively increases as the player completes specific missions designated by the quest giver. Mission rewards are often generated randomly, often requiring the player to grind the same monster repeatedly to get the right parts. Weapons and armor have intrinsic bonuses or penalties towards certain types of elemental or physical damages, and may provide special skills which can be fine-tuned through the mix-and-matching of equipment pieces.

The games feature a variety of different weapon classes, ranging from swords, hammers, and bows, with the most recent titles (Generations, World, and Rise) having a total of fourteen classes. Each weapon class has a unique set of combat maneuvers and reflect a number of different play styles based on speed of attack, damage strength, range and the application of buffs and debuffs to monsters and allies. Monster Hunter games use an "animation priority" combat, committing the player to a move until the animation is completed and leaving them potentially vulnerable to a monster's attack. Further, players are encouraged to watch their Hunter's health and stamina. Losing all health will force a retreat to a base camp, and after three such retreats, the mission is deemed a failure. Performing certain combat actions consumes stamina, which recovers in a short amount of time; once exhausted of stamina, the Hunter becomes vulnerable as they pause to catch their breath. Monsters and other environmental hazards can also inflict blights and other negative status effects that impair combat abilities. Combat is centered around watching for a monster's tells prior to an attack to be able to dodge it and/or make a counterattack, and looking for openings to unleash strings of attack combos, depending on the Hunter's current weapon. Unlike most other action games, Monster Hunter fights have been compared to a series of boss fights.

Nearly all Monster Hunter games have a single-player mode; in these, the Hunter is often accompanied by a Felyne or Palico, a bipedal sentient cat-like creature that supports the player with limited offensive abilities in combat. Felynes also assist the player in cooking meals, maintaining gardens, and returning them to camp if they are defeated in battle. The noises of Felynes are created using the real-life vocalizations of cats owned by the games' development team, comprising a library of cat noises stretching back to the original Monster Hunter. The noises are sometimes arranged in order to depict a situation that would be impossible to subject a real cat to, such as being attacked by a monster.

Most Monster Hunter games released with support for four-player cooperative online modes, allowing the group to hunt down stronger versions of monsters, though this support has since been disabled in older games. The games typically have a main quest line, frequently called "Low Rank" or "Village Quests", which can take up to fifty hours to complete. Once completed, the game opens up with new "High Rank" or "Gathering Hall" quests, featuring stronger versions of monsters they have previously faced, as well as new monsters not yet seen and unique variants of these foes, all of which provide better components for more powerful weapons and armor sets, providing hundreds of hours of potential gameplay following the main quest. Most titles have a third rank of difficulty ("G Rank" or "Master Rank"), released after the base game in the form of a DLC. These add more monsters, locations, weapons and armour sets to the game.

== Development history ==
Release timeline
2004	Monster Hunter
2005	Monster Hunter G
2005	Monster Hunter Freedom
2006	Monster Hunter 2
2007	Monster Hunter Frontier Online
2007	Monster Hunter Freedom 2
2008	Monster Hunter Freedom Unite
2009	Monster Hunter Tri
2010	Monster Hunter Diary: Poka Poka Airou Village
2010	Monster Hunter Portable 3rd
2011	Monster Hunter Dynamic Hunting
2011	Monster Hunter 3 Ultimate
2012
2013	Monster Hunter 4
2013	Monster Hunter Frontier G
2014	Monster Hunter 4: Ultimate
2015	Monster Hunter Explore
2015	Monster Hunter Generations
2016	Monster Hunter Stories
2016	Monster Hunter Frontier Z
2017	Monster Hunter Generations: Ultimate
2018	Monster Hunter: World
2019	Monster Hunter World: Iceborne
2020
2021	Monster Hunter Rise
2021	Monster Hunter Stories 2: Wings of Ruin
2022	Monster Hunter Rise: Sunbreak
2023	Monster Hunter Now
2024
2025	Monster Hunter Wilds
2026	Monster Hunter Stories 3: Twisted Reflection
2026	Monster Hunter Outlanders
2027	Monster Hunter Wilds: Ascendance

The first Monster Hunter game was one of three titles Capcom had developed to take advantage of the processing power and online capabilities of the PlayStation 2, which according to Ryozo Tsujimoto, who has been the series' producer since Monster Hunter Freedom 2, had begun to match arcade games in capabilities; the other two such titles were Auto Modellista and Resident Evil Outbreak. Tsujimoto considered Monster Hunter to be the culmination of the work of these other two titles once it was released. He also felt that the game was intended for such cooperative play so that players of any skill level, working with others, could feel accomplished in taking down giant creatures. Monster Hunter proved a success, selling over 1 million copies, principally in Japan. Enhanced versions of the early games, adding more difficult monsters and end-game quests, were released with a "G" affixed to the end (such as Monster Hunter G for the first such game); for those titles that were released in Western regions, these were often, though not always, affixed with the Ultimate moniker. A second team worked to develop a series for the PlayStation Portable. These games often had a more lighthearted tone and expanded upon the Palico system. In Japan, these games were released under the "Portable" title, while in the west they were released under the "Freedom" title. Even after these naming conventions were abandoned, this established the general tradition of one team releasing games for home consoles and a separate team releasing a portable game a few years later.

The series took off explosively in Japan with Monster Hunter G and Monster Hunter Portable/Freedom on the PlayStation Portable and even more so once its sequels Monster Hunter Dos, Monster Hunter Portable 2nd/Freedom 2 and Monster Hunter Portable 2nd G/Freedom Unite were released which supported up to four players. Handheld systems are generally more popular in Japan and due to the country's high population density, it was easy to find players to hunt cooperatively with, making it a phenomenon there. Capcom's Ryozo Tsujimoto stated that Freedom 2 was released at a time when players in Japan would not normally gather at a friend's house to play games together, so the networking capabilities of the PSP helped to drive the success of Freedom 2 and accelerate sales of the series beyond the original PlayStation 2 titles. James Miekle, writing for PC Gamer, had worked for Q Entertainment and lived in Japan during the release of Monster Hunter Portable 3rd, which was the best-selling PlayStation Portable game of all time and described how even during work, impromptu Monster Hunter sessions would break out between employees and there was extensive marketing of Monster Hunter branded consumer goods.

While Monster Hunter had been successful in Japan, its popularity in Western markets (primarily North America and Europe) languished. In contrast to the Japanese culture, Western markets favored home consoles and computers during the mid-2000s and because of a thinner population density, most players relied on Internet-based gaming rather than local ad hoc networking. The series also struggled with a difficult learning curve that had made the games off-putting in Western markets. Because of the series' limited interest outside Japan, the developers generally focused on Japan market-specific features, such as first releases within the country and in-game events for Japanese players, which reinforced the perception that Monster Hunter was aimed primarily at Japanese players, further alienating Western players from the series.

The series had little popularity in the West until the release of Monster Hunter 3 Ultimate on the Nintendo 3DS, a console that had gained a sizable foothold in Western markets. While Monster Hunter's popularity in the West was still to a niche group, Capcom saw the potential for more growth there and took steps to better localize the next few titles to make the series more attractive. Using Monster Hunter 4 as a starting point, Capcom put more effort into working with its localization teams to help provide feedback to make the interface, tutorials, and dialogs more appealing to a global audience. Monster Hunter 4 was the first game in the series to break one million sales in Western markets. Capcom had begun to shift towards developing their games catalog for a global market for their catalog was buoyed by the success of Resident Evil 7. In an October 2016 interview, Capcom chairman Kenzo Tsujimoto said they were looking towards increasing the popularity of the games in the Western markets, recognizing that gaming consoles like the PlayStation 4 and Xbox One have dominance in these regions over handhelds.

Monster Hunter: World, the series' first major entry targeting home consoles and computers, was developed to be more alluring for Western markets without trying to make the game simpler, with the main development teams in Japan working more closely with Capcom's Western offices to identify such improvements. A number of changes in gameplay were made that took advantage of the consoles' new technology; notably, while the prior games had split each hunting area into different zones as necessitated by limits of the console hardware, World's used seamless zones and several changes to gameplay were made to account for this. Other small gameplay details were added to meet common expectations for action games were also added, such as adding damage indicator values on successful weapon attacks, which the developers found also provided useful feedback to draw in new players. World became the series' best-selling game, achieving more than 21 million units sold by 2022 and making the Monster Hunter series Capcom's best-selling series following Resident Evil.

With the success of the changes to the formula defined by World, Capcom decided to continue this approach with the series' next major titles, Monster Hunter Rise for the Nintendo Switch and Windows, and for Monster Hunter Wilds for PlayStation 5, Xbox Series X and S, and Windows.

== Games ==
Below is a list of games in the Monster Hunter main series. Each generation has a number of entries that are derivative of the original release. While the first four main titles were numbered, the subsequent installments, starting with World, use a keyword instead of a number to reflect a central concept for that game. While the games have often been split into the numbered mainline games and the portable titles by players, this distinction is not held to the same degree by Capcom, according to Tsujimoto, and instead each title is based on "what it is we want to achieve with this title, what we want the player to experience, which hardware we're gonna target and how it's gonna affect the gameplay. The games just come together the way they end up each time."

=== Main series ===
Title	Original release date		
Title	Japan	North America	PAL region
Monster Hunter	March 11, 2004	September 21, 2004	May 27, 2005
Notes: Released internationally for PlayStation 2.; Monster Hunter G, an enhanced version of Monster Hunter, released exclusively in Japan and Korea for PlayStation 2 and Wii.
Monster Hunter 2	February 16, 2006		
Notes: Released exclusively in Japan for PlayStation 2.
Monster Hunter Tri	August 1, 2009	April 20, 2010	April 23, 2010
Notes: Released internationally for Wii.; Monster Hunter 3 Ultimate, an enhanced port of Monster Hunter Tri that incorporated content from Monster Hunter Portable 3rd, released internationally for Nintendo 3DS and Wii U.
Monster Hunter 4	September 14, 2013	February 13, 2015	February 13, 2015
Notes: Released exclusively in Japan for Nintendo 3DS.; Monster Hunter 4 Ultimate, an enhanced version of Monster Hunter 4, released internationally for Nintendo 3DS.
Monster Hunter: World	January 26, 2018	January 26, 2018	January 26, 2018
Notes: Released on PlayStation 4 and Xbox One, and first in series to be released worldwide simultaneously. A Microsoft Windows version was released on August 9, 2018.; Brought multiple changes to standard gameplay, such as the elimination of loading screens between map zones, and a more approachable design for new players to the series.; Monster Hunter World: Iceborne, a major story-based expansion, released for PlayStation 4 and Xbox One in September 2019 and for Windows in January 2020.; In Japan, Xbox One version was unavailable before June 5, 2024.
Monster Hunter Wilds	February 28, 2025	February 28, 2025	February 28, 2025
Notes: Simultaneous worldwide release for PlayStation 5, Xbox Series X/S and Windows, including cross-platform play support.; Modeled after World, includes regions with weather patterns that affect hunting conditions, ability to switch to a second weapon stored on the player's mount, and Focus mode actions in combat that allow for more precise attacks and defenses.; Monster Hunter Wilds: Ascendance, the game's major expansion, is scheduled for release in 2027.

=== Portable series ===
Title	Original release date		
Title	Japan	North America	PAL region
Monster Hunter Freedom	December 1, 2005	May 23, 2006	May 12, 2006
Notes: Monster Hunter Freedom, an enhanced port of Monster Hunter G, released internationally for PlayStation Portable.
Monster Hunter Freedom 2	February 22, 2007	August 28, 2007	September 7, 2007
Notes: A new game retaining the core content of Monster Hunter 2 and adding upon it, released internationally for PlayStation Portable.; Monster Hunter Freedom Unite, an enhanced version of Monster Hunter Freedom 2, released internationally for PlayStation Portable and iOS.
Monster Hunter Portable 3rd	December 1, 2010		
Notes: A new game retaining the core content of Monster Hunter Tri and adding upon it, released exclusively in Japan and Korea for PlayStation Portable and PlayStation 3.
Monster Hunter Generations	November 28, 2015	July 15, 2016	July 15, 2016
Notes: Released internationally for Nintendo 3DS. Known as Monster Hunter X (cross-) in Japan.; Monster Hunter Generations Ultimate, an enhanced version of Monster Hunter Generations, released internationally for Nintendo Switch on August 28, 2018. Known as Monster Hunter XX in Japan, where it was released August 2017 on Nintendo 3DS and Nintendo Switch.; Plays with more emphasis on action and customization.
Monster Hunter Rise	March 26, 2021	March 26, 2021	March 26, 2021
Notes: Released worldwide on the Nintendo Switch. A Microsoft Windows version was released on January 12, 2022. Versions for PlayStation 4, PlayStation 5, Xbox One and Xbox Series X/S were released on January 20, 2023. iOS and Android versions were sidt-launched on October 7, 2026.; Cross-compatibility features with Monster Hunter Stories 2: Wings of Ruin.; Monster Hunter Rise: Sunbreak, a massive story-based expansion, released internationally on June 30, 2022 for Switch and Windows versions. Sunbreak released on the other consoles on April 28th, 2023.

=== Other games ===
Game	Details
Monster Hunter i Original release date(s): JP: February 6, 2006	Release years by system: 2006 – Supported DoCoMo phones
Monster Hunter i Original release date(s): JP: February 6, 2006	Notes: It is a port of Monster Hunter G for the cellphone.
Monster Hunter Frontier Original release date(s): JP: June 21, 2007	Release years by system: 2007 – Microsoft Windows; 2010 – Xbox 360; 2013 – An updated version called Monster Hunter Frontier G was released on Microsoft Windows, Xbox 360, PlayStation 3, Wii U 2014 – PlayStation Vita; 2016 – Another updated version called Monster Hunter Frontier Z was released on Wii U, PlayStation 4, PlayStation 3, PlayStation Vita and Xbox 360
Monster Hunter Frontier Original release date(s): JP: June 21, 2007	Notes: The first full-fledged MMORPG spin-off.; Released only in Japan.; Shut down on December 18, 2019.
Monster Hunter Diary: Poka Poka Airou Village Original release date(s): JP: August 26, 2010	Release years by system: 2010 – Released on PlayStation Portable 2011 – An expanded version called Monster Hunter Diary: Poka Poka Airou Village G was released on PlayStation Portable; 2015 – An enhanced port called Monster Hunter Diary: Poka Poka Airou Village DX was released on Nintendo 3DS
Monster Hunter Diary: Poka Poka Airou Village Original release date(s): JP: August 26, 2010	Notes: A game based on the series' catlike "Felyne" creatures, known as the Airou (アイルー, Airū) in the Japanese language games.; The subtitle of the game can be translated into English as "Warm Felyne Village".; The game has only been released in Japan.
Monster Hunter Dynamic Hunting Original release date(s): WW: June 1, 2011	Release years by system: 2011 – iOS
Monster Hunter Dynamic Hunting Original release date(s): WW: June 1, 2011	Notes: First game in the series to be on iOS.; A fighting game spin-off.
Monster Hunter Online Original release date(s): CHN: August 18, 2013	Release years by system: 2013 – Microsoft Windows
Monster Hunter Online Original release date(s): CHN: August 18, 2013	Notes: Second Monster Hunter MMORPG as a collaboration between Tencent and Capcom.; Uses Crytek's CryEngine 3.; Free-to-play business model.; Beta in Cancini began on July 6, 2013.; Planned to be released only for Windows.; Shut down on December 31, 2019.; Though developed primarily for Chinese players, and solely uses the Chinese language, the game is not region locked, and only limited by the language limitations. Tencent has approved the distribution of an English-language patch created by a fan group in May 2016.
Monster Hunter Spirits Original release date(s): JP: June 5, 2015	Release years by system: 2015 – Arcade
Monster Hunter Spirits Original release date(s): JP: June 5, 2015	Notes: A spin-off card game co-developed with Marvelous.
Monster Hunter Explore Original release date(s): JP: September 3, 2015	Release years by system: 2015 – iOS; 2015 – Android
Monster Hunter Explore Original release date(s): JP: September 3, 2015	Notes: Name was changed from Monster Hunter Smart.; Shut down on November 27, 2020.
Monster Hunter Stories Original release date(s): JP: October 8, 2016; NA: September 8, 2017; EU: September 8, 2017; AU: September 9, 2017	Release years by system: 2016 – Nintendo 3DS; 2017 – iOS, Android; 2024 – Nintendo Switch, PlayStation 4, Windows; 2025 – Xbox One
Monster Hunter Stories Original release date(s): JP: October 8, 2016; NA: September 8, 2017; EU: September 8, 2017; AU: September 9, 2017	Notes: Plays more as a traditional role-playing game with less focus on action elements.; Has turn-based combat.; Much larger emphasis on story than mainline entries.; Has the player take control of various monsters from throughout the series and use them as pets/partners called Monsties.; Remastered version for modern systems released in 2024.
Monster Hunter Riders Original release date(s): JP: February 29, 2020	Release years by system: 2020 - iOS, Android
Monster Hunter Riders Original release date(s): JP: February 29, 2020	Notes: Plays more as a traditional role-playing game with less focus on action elements and turn-based combat.
Monster Hunter Stories 2: Wings of Ruin Original release date(s): WW: July 9, 2021	Release years by system: 2021 – Microsoft Windows, Nintendo Switch; 2024 – PlayStation 4; 2025 – Xbox One
Monster Hunter Stories 2: Wings of Ruin Original release date(s): WW: July 9, 2021	Notes: Expands upon the previous game with new mechanics for battle, and monster build types also a much larger roster of monsters; much like Monster Hunter Rise, many returning monsters are from Monster Hunter World.; Has co-op multiplayer.; Cross-compatibility features with Monster Hunter Rise.
Monster Hunter Now Original release date(s): WW: September 14, 2023	Release years by system: 2023 - Android and iOS
Monster Hunter Now Original release date(s): WW: September 14, 2023	Notes: An augmented reality game developed by Capcom and Niantic, Inc.
Monster Hunter Stories 3: Twisted Reflection Original release date(s): WW: March 13, 2026	Release years by system: Nintendo Switch 2, Microsoft Windows, PlayStation 5, Xbox Series X/S
Monster Hunter Stories 3: Twisted Reflection Original release date(s): WW: March 13, 2026	Notes: Includes monsters from "Monster Hunter Rise" and "Monster Hunter Wilds"
Monster Hunter Outlanders Original release date(s): WW: October 29, 2026	Release years by system: 2026 - Android and iOS
Monster Hunter Outlanders Original release date(s): WW: October 29, 2026	Notes: A mobile game developed in the more traditional style of Monster Hunter with additional survival game elements. Co-developed by TiMi Studio Group and Capcom.

== Other media ==
=== In-game crossovers ===
A female Monster Hunter appeared as a playable character via downloadable content in Marvel vs. Capcom: Infinite. The game also features a stage called "Valkanda", which combines Val Habar from the fourth installment with Wakanda from the Marvel universe. Rathalos and Tigrex, two of the series' flagship monsters, make a cameo appearance in Metal Gear Solid: Peace Walker on hunting missions. Rathalos appeared as a special event monster to fight in Final Fantasy XIV as part of a cross-promotional event with Monster Hunter: World, with the Behemoth appearing in World in return. Final Fantasy XIV would have another cross-promotional event with Monster Hunter Wilds, with Guardian Arkveld, a variant of the flagship monster of Wilds, appearing as a special event monster in Final Fantasy XIV, and Omega Planetes, a unique entity inspired by the Final Fantasy XIV iteration of the recurring Final Fantasy superboss, appeared in Wilds. In 2018, Rathalos also appeared as a boss character and a summonable Assist Trophy in the crossover fighting game, Super Smash Bros. Ultimate, while several Mii Fighter costumes based on Monster Hunter were added post-launch in March 2021 a few weeks ahead of Rise's release. In 2020, Rathalos made a limited appearance in Cygames' mobile title Dragalia Lost as part of an in-game event. In 2023, Rathalos made an appearance as a limited-time boss in the mobile game Arknights, as part of the latter's Monster Hunter crossover event titled A Flurry to the Flame.

The Monster Hunter games themselves have offered crossover events with other Capcom and third-party properties, allowing users during the event to earn armor and weapons inspired by the other property. For example, Monster Hunter World has had promotional events that include Resident Evil, Mega Man, Assassin's Creed, and The Witcher series.

=== Anime ===
A series of anime shorts titled MonHun Nikki Girigiri Airū-mura Airū Kiki Ippatsu (ja:モンハン日記 ぎりぎりアイルー村) was broadcast beginning August 10, 2010. A sequel, MonHun Nikki Girigiri Airū-mura G, was produced. An anime series based on the franchise premiered on October 2, 2016.

=== Manga and comics ===
A manga titled Monster Hunter Orage was published jointly by Kodansha and Capcom in April 2008. The author of the manga is Hiro Mashima. There are four volumes total with the last volume published on May 4, 2009. An English release of Monster Hunter Orage first took place on June 28, 2011. A second manga, Monster Hunter: Flash Hunter, was published beginning in May 2011. It was written by Keiichi Hikami and illustrated by Shin Yamamoto. The series ran for 10 volumes, with the final volume released on May 20, 2015. The English edition was first published on April 12, 2016. Elements from Monster Hunter were later included in the Worlds Unite comic crossover from Archie Comics, which featured several other Capcom and Sega franchises making guest appearances in the previously running Sonic the Hedgehog and Mega Man comic lines.

=== Card game ===
A trading card game titled Monster Hunter Hunting Card was released in October 2008 with periodic updates planned.

=== Merchandise ===
In 2013, several Monster Hunter 4 figures were given away as prizes in Japan, including ones based on Felynes. In 2014, a Mega Man crossover toy was released, a set of Felyne-themed 3DS XL accessories, as well as a 24 karat gold Felyne statue that cost almost $30,000 to celebrate the series' 10-year anniversary. In 2017, a highly detailed doll of a Felyne was released by Capcom for 162,000 yen. More unusual products include Felyne toilet paper-holders. Beyond merchandise, a Felyne-themed car was used to promote the series at the Odaiba Motor Festival. In 2022, merchandise featuring the characters was utilized in a public safety promotion as part of an ongoing partnership between Capcom and local Japanese police.

=== Film ===
The conception of a film based on the series started in 2012 by director Paul W. S. Anderson. The film was formally announced by Capcom in October 2018, with production starting that month with Impact Pictures and Constantin Film and was released in the United Kingdom and China on December 4, 2020. The film is based on a United Nations task force falling into an alternate dimension where Hunters fight off monsters and the force joins the Hunters to prevent monsters from returning through the portal to Earth. The film starred Milla Jovovich, Ron Perlman, T.I. Harris, Diego Boneta and Tony Jaa.

=== Animated film ===
In 2018, Capcom and Pure Imagination Studios announced that they are working on a 3D animated film Monster Hunter: Legends of the Guild. The special was written by Joshua Fine, and features a fledgling hunter taking down an Elder Dragon. Originally slated for a 2019 release, the film was released on August 12, 2021, on Netflix.

=== Digital collectibles ===
On 21 May 2023 Capcom released the first digital collectible NFTs of Monster Hunters on the Veve platform.

== Reception ==
The Monster Hunter series surpassed 100 million units sold by May 2024, with nearly half of those sales attributed to World, Rise and their associated expansions, and making it Capcom's second-best selling series after Resident Evil, with Monster Hunter: World being the company's best-selling game. On completion of its fiscal year on March 31, 2025, Capcom reported its twelfth straight year of profit growth, which they attribute in part to the Monster Hunter series games from World onward.

Monster Hunter Wilds sold over 8 million units after the first three days of launch, making it the fastest selling game in Capcom's history.

The augmented-reality mobile game Monster Hunter Now has also been considered a success for Capcom, with over 15 million players using the app.

Total worldwide sales for Monster Hunter games exceeding 1 million units, through December 2025 are listed below:

Title	Sales (millions of units) As of December 31, 2025
Monster Hunter World	22.00 (Including Iceborne Master Edition bundle: 29.40)
Monster Hunter Rise	18.27
Monster Hunter World: Iceborne	15.90
Monster Hunter Wilds	11.09
Monster Hunter Rise: Sunbreak	10.90
Monster Hunter XX/Generations Ultimate	5.20
Monster Hunter Portable 3rd	4.90
Monster Hunter X/Generations	4.30
Monster Hunter 4G/4 Ultimate	4.20
Monster Hunter 4	4.10
Monster Hunter Portable 2nd G/Freedom Unite	3.80
Monster Hunter 3G/3 Ultimate	2.60
Monster Hunter Portable 2nd/Freedom 2	2.40
Monster Hunter Stories 2: Wings of Ruin	2.40
Monster Hunter 3/Tri	1.90
Monster Hunter Portable/Freedom	1.30

Several commentators consider the series' Felynes or Palicoes to be an integral staple of Monster Hunter. The Palicoes in Monster Hunter: World received a great deal of social media publicity when their vocalizations attracted the attention of real-life cats of players.

== See also ==
- Dauntless, a free-to-play game with a similar gameplay mechanic but which requires an Internet connection to play
- Freedom Wars
- God Eater, a video game franchise with a similar gameplay mechanic
- Horizon Zero Dawn
- Lord of Arcana
- Soul Sacrifice
- Toukiden
- Wild Hearts
- Ragnarok Odyssey
