= Monster Hunter Freedom Unite =

2008 video game

- North American PSP box art
- Developer: Capcom Production Studio 1
- Publisher: Capcom
- Director: Yasunori Ichinose
- Producer: Ryozo Tsujimoto
- Designers: Katsuhiro Eguchi; Yuji Matsumoto; Shintaro Kojima
- Composers: Yuko Komiyama; Akihiko Narita; Tadayoshi Makino
- Series: Monster Hunter
- Platforms: PlayStation Portable, PlayStation Vita, iOS
- Release: PlayStation Portable: JP: March 27, 2008; NA: June 22, 2009; AU: June 25, 2009; EU: June 26, 2009; iOS: JP: May 8, 2014; WW: July 2, 2014
- Genre: Action role-playing
- Modes: Single-player, multiplayer

Monster Hunter Freedom Unite is an action role-playing game developed and published by Capcom for the PlayStation Portable and iOS. It is an expanded version of the original Monster Hunter Freedom 2 and was released on March 27, 2008, in Japan as Monster Hunter Portable 2nd G (モンスターハンターポータブル2nd G, Monsutā Hantā Pōtaburu 2nd G).

== Gameplay ==
Monster Hunter Freedom Unite has more missions, equipment, and monsters than Monster Hunter Freedom 2, and a new Felyne fighter to help the player on their quests. Rarity 9 and 10 armor and weapons were added. Players can now hold up to 99 of each item type in their item boxes, store up to 20 equipment sets, and get ten equipment pages instead of six. A new type of quest, the "Epic Hunting Quest", was introduced, which enables the player to take on, one by one, up to four different monsters in one quest. Weapons can now have up to purple sharpness which is higher than white sharpness. The player can now accept HR 7-9 quests in the gathering hall and new elder quests outside the gathering hall from a Felyne beside the village elder. The downloadable content can give the player special armor for their Felyne along with early unlocks for some of the Felyne skills. The introduction of new monsters such as the Ukanlos have been put into the game with even more creatures than the last version of Monster Hunter Freedom 2 on the PSP system.

== Development ==
On November 6, 2008, the beta version of a new online service allowing voice chat and gameplay via tunneling PSP AdHoc mode to work same way as infrastructure mode does, through the PlayStation Network (and a LAN connected Wi-Fi capable PlayStation 3) was released on the Japanese PlayStation Store. Ad hoc Party for PlayStation Portable beta version is compatible with Monster Hunter Freedom Unite.

== Marketing and release ==
In the 2008 Tokyo Game Show, it was announced that the game would be released in North America as Monster Hunter Freedom Unite in Spring 2009. At the 2009 GDC, the release date was further specified as June 23, 2009. The United States and the Australian demo are available for free on the PlayStation Network on the PSP as of May 21, 2009. Capcom has announced that the PSP bundle would be released in Europe, but were not specific about anywhere else. A press release at Capcom's European Press Center website states that the bundle would contain "a specially designed Monster Hunter branded PSP skin and pouch along with a copy of the game." As for the release in Japan, there was a special edition PSP bundle which included the game, a strap, and a decorated Matte Bronze PSP. In addition to this bundle, people who pre-ordered the game also received a black, hairy strap. The hair on the strap was meant to be that of a monster exclusive to the game, the Nargacuga.

Although no longer available, Capcom had created the Encyclopedia Gigantica, a website for newcomers to the Monster Hunter series. It had included tutorial videos, images of monsters, forums and more. This website has been shut down.

Capcom was also holding a temporary Gathering Hall between July 3 and September 1 in London, Charing Cross, for all Unite players to play in a campaign to make the franchise more popular in the West to see future titles to be released overseas. Capcom's Monster Hunter Freedom Unite website, as well as Encyclopedia Gigantica, are sending out demo copies of Monster Hunter Freedom Unite to anyone who registers for one.

This demo has a set equipment list for each of the weapon categories, and the player may also select between three felyne helpers to join the player. The player may choose between three quests, totaling about 2 hours of game time.

An iOS version was released in 2014. With the release of iOS 9, the game lost compatibility and Capcom initially announced no plans to update the game, later removing from the App Store. However, it later returned with fixed compatibility.

== Reception ==
Reception

Aggregate score
Aggregator	Score	
Aggregator	iOS	PSP
Metacritic	86/100	81/100

Review scores
Publication	Score	
Publication	iOS	PSP
1Up.com	N/A	A
Edge	N/A	7/10
Eurogamer	N/A	8/10
GamePro	N/A	3/5
GameRevolution	N/A	B
GameSpot	N/A	6.5/10
GameTrailers	N/A	8.1/10
GameZone	N/A	8.5/10
IGN	N/A	(AU) 9.5/10 (US) 8/10
PlayStation: The Official Magazine	N/A	4/5
TouchArcade	5/5	N/A

Monster Hunter Freedom Unite received "favorable" reviews on both platforms according to video game review aggregator Metacritic.

The Japanese release of the PSP version sold 670,000 copies on its release day, and in its first week sold one million copies. As of July 8, 2009, the game had sold 3.5 million copies in the region. While no official numbers on American sales have been released at this time, As of 2016, the game had sold 3.7 million copies (across MHP2G & MHFU) worldwide, making it one of the best-selling games on the PSP. As of 2018, the title fell to sixth place (with 3.8M sales) behind its successor Monster Hunter Portable 3rd (4.9M sales as of 2018, despite no western release).
