= Monster Hunter Freedom 2 =

2007 video game

- North American box art
- Developer: Capcom Production Studio 1
- Publisher: Capcom
- Director: Yasunori Ichinose
- Producer: Ryozo Tsujimoto
- Designers: Katsuhiro Eguchi; Yuji Matsumoto; Shintaro Kojima; Mori‑bait; Kennsuke Imamura; 4mono Hirokazu Fujisaki; Akira Matsumoto; Kouki Fuse; Yuya Tokuda; Masanori Komine
- Composers: Masato Kohda; Akihiko Narita; Yuko Komiyama
- Series: Monster Hunter
- Platform: PlayStation Portable
- Release: JP: February 22, 2007; NA: August 28, 2007; KOR: August 28, 2007; EU: September 7, 2007; AU: September 12, 2007
- Genre: Action role-playing
- Modes: Single-player, multiplayer

Monster Hunter Freedom 2 (Note: Japanese: モンスターハンターポータブル2nd, Hepburn: Monsutā Hantā Pōtaburu 2nd; lit. Monster Hunter Portable 2nd) is a 2007 action role-playing game developed and published by Capcom for the PlayStation Portable. It is the second handheld installment in the Monster Hunter franchise. Marketed as a sequel to Monster Hunter Freedom, Freedom 2 is an original title that adapts the core content of Monster Hunter 2 into a new single player campaign, adding supplemental original content.

An expanded version of the game, Monster Hunter Freedom Unite, was released in North America on June 22, 2009.

== Gameplay ==
Most Quests in Monster Hunter Freedom 2 involve killing one or two 'Boss' class monsters. Smaller quests at the beginning will involve gathering items and killing small creatures.

Quests are generally divided into three difficulty levels: those from the Village Chief, known as 'Elder' quests; those for a lower Hunter Rank (HR3 or lower) from the Guild; those for hunters who have obtained higher Hunter Ranks (HR4 or above), also from the Guild, and lastly there are Treasure hunting Quests given by Treshi the Treasure Hunter. Hunters can always accept quests that are available for the same or lower Hunter Rank, but cannot take quests or join quests initiated by other higher Ranked players, unless they have the required Hunter Rank (i.e. if an HR5 player initiates a quest requiring an HR of 4, HRs 4, 5 and 6 may join while HRs 1, 2 and 3 may not). There are also quests offered by the village's Training School. Quests offered by the Training school require no items or equipment; pre-made equipment and item sets are supplied. Treasure hunting quests are gathering quests with rare items that you cannot keep but are awarded points to add to your ending score, which you are rewarded for.

The quests that are taken from the Village Elder are quests specific to single player, so they are also sometimes considered "lower" rank quests. Monsters inside these quests are weakened in terms of their hit points to suit a single hunter quest, but they only offer basic materials that can only create weapons of lower rarity.

Lower Hunter Rank quests from the guild offers the same materials as Elder quests, but they allow up to 4 Hunters via ad-hoc play or XLink Kai. Monsters have slightly increased hit points in this type of quest.

Higher Hunter Rank quests are considered the most difficult in the game, and are the equivalent of 'G' rank missions in Monster Hunter Freedom and Monster Hunter G. Besides considerable hitpoint increases, monsters have greatly increased damage and can feature new attack moves, making them harder to defeat. Many of the rarest materials can only be found in this type of quest. These rare materials can be used to create rare and powerful equipment that can kill monsters easier, but in return you will start in a random area and supplies will not be delivered until the battle is nearly done.

Downloadable quests often provide special materials that can create bonus equipment that cannot be created otherwise.

== Reception ==
Reception

Aggregate score
Aggregator	Score
Metacritic	72/100

Review scores
Publication	Score
Edge	7/10
Electronic Gaming Monthly	6.17/10
Eurogamer	7/10
Game Informer	7/10
GamePro	4/5
GameSpot	5/10
GameSpy	4/5
GameTrailers	7.6/10
GameZone	8.2/10
IGN	8.3/10
PlayStation: The Official Magazine	7/10
411Mania	8/10

Monster Hunter Freedom 2 received "average" reviews according to video game review aggregator Metacritic.

As of March 31, 2008, the game has sold 2.15 million copies, according to Capcom. As of July 9, 2008, the game has sold 1,701,980 copies in Japan, according to Famitsu. As of January 4, 2009, the re-release of Monster Hunter Portable 2nd G under the "Best" brand, has sold 271,000 copies in Japan. Monster Hunter Portable 2nd G was the best-selling game of Japan in 2008, selling 2,452,111 in that year (expect "PSP the Best"), beating other major titles such as Pokémon Platinum and Wii Fit. Famitsu also gave the 2nd G version a score of all four nines for a total of 36 out of 40.
