= Monster Hunter Freedom =

2005 video game

- North American box art
- Developer: Capcom Production Studio 1
- Publisher: Capcom
- Director: Yasunori Ichinose
- Producer: Tsuyoshi Tanaka
- Designers: Katsuhiro Eguchi; Yuji Matsumoto; Kennsuke Imamura; Yōichirō Ikeda; Shintaro Kojima; Eri Sawada; Goro Terada
- Composers: Masato Kohda; Yuko Komiyama; Akihiko Narita
- Series: Monster Hunter
- Platform: PlayStation Portable
- Release: JP: December 1, 2005; EU: May 12, 2006; NA: May 23, 2006; AU: May 26, 2006
- Genre: Action role-playing
- Modes: Single player, multiplayer

Monster Hunter Freedom (Note: Japanese: モンスターハンターポータブル, Hepburn: Monsutā Hantā Pōtaburu; lit. Monster Hunter Portable) is a 2005 action role-playing game developed and published by Capcom for the PlayStation Portable. The first handheld installment in the Monster Hunter franchise, the game is an enhanced port of Monster Hunter G, rebalanced to allow for easier solo quest completion and game progression.

== Gameplay ==
Just like its predecessors, Monster Hunter and Monster Hunter G, this game revolves around the player completing quests and gathering materials to upgrade their equipment in order to advance. The more rare the items and equipment, the stronger the main physical aspects of the character will be. Unlike other hack 'n' slash games, this game requires planning and skill in order to overcome large monsters instead of brute force. There are many weapons which the hunter can use to bring down the monsters, these are Sword and Shield, Great Swords, Dual Blades, Hammers, Lances, Light Bowguns and Heavy Bowguns. Each requires a variety of items to create which are acquired by completing quests, and collecting the spoils carved from monsters or found on the ground.

=== Singleplayer ===
In this mode the player can do village elder quests, and enter the Offline Gathering Hall to do guild quests by themselves, and buy items to aid in the completion of the quest. The player can also tend to a farm to harvest useful items.

=== Multiplayer ===
If players enter the Online Gathering Hall they can go on quests with other players via the PSP's adhoc. They can exchange guild cards which keep track of the characters stats. They can also go on treasure hunting quests. While the characters are waiting for others to join their quests there is a table they can sit at. While sitting at the table, you can push the different directions on the directional arrows to perform various animations such as swinging their beer mug, or passing out from drunkenness. Players can also use third party software to connect with other players over the internet to play with each other wirelessly.

== Classes ==
=== Hunter Ranks ===
There are a number of Hunter ranks, given numerical values from HR1 to HR5. As the player's Hunter rank increases, they will get access to more difficult monsters, and in turn more and better items and weapons.

=== G-Rank ===
G-Rank is a new addition to Monster Hunter Freedom. These quests are taken straight from Monster Hunter G, which was unreleased in the U.S and Europe, and present a much more difficult challenge for hunters. In return for this, hunters receive better rewards for completing the quest as well as access to some of the stronger variations of previously encountered monsters, known as "sub-species". There are also certain monsters that can only be encountered in this particular rank.

== Reception ==
Reception

Aggregate score
| Aggregator | Score |
|---|---|
| Metacritic | 71/100 |

Review scores
| Publication | Score |
|---|---|
| Electronic Gaming Monthly | 7/10 |
| Eurogamer | 6/10 |
| Famitsu | 34/40 |
| Game Informer | 4/10 |
| GamePro | 3.75/5 |
| GameRevolution | D+ |
| GameSpot | 6.5/10 |
| GameSpy | 3.5/5 |
| GameTrailers | 4.8/10 |
| GameZone | 7.6/10 |
| IGN | 7.7/10 |
| Official U.S. PlayStation Magazine | 4/5 |
| Detroit Free Press | 2/4 |
| The Sydney Morning Herald | 3.5/5 |

The game received "average reviews" according to video game review aggregator Metacritic. In Japan, Famitsu gave it a score of two nines and two eights, for a total of 34 out of 40.
