= Monster Hunter 4 =

2013 video game

- Developer: Capcom
- Publisher: Capcom
- Director: Kaname Fujioka
- Producer: Hironobu Takeshita
- Composers: Marika Suzuki; Miwako Chinone; Reo Uratani
- Series: Monster Hunter
- Engine: MT Framework Mobile
- Platform: Nintendo 3DS
- Release: Original version: JP: 14 September 2013; 4G/Ultimate: JP: 11 October 2014; NA: 13 February 2015; EU: 13 February 2015; AU: 14 February 2015
- Genre: Action role-playing
- Modes: Single-player, multiplayer

Monster Hunter 4 (Note: Japanese: モンスターハンター4, Hepburn: Monsutā Hantā Fō) is an action role-playing game developed and published by Capcom. It is the fourth game in the Monster Hunter series and the second to be released on the Nintendo 3DS. Originally released in Japan on September 14, 2013. On January 26, 2014, an enhanced edition titled Monster Hunter 4G was announced for release in Japan on October 11, 2014, and allowed players to utilize Monster Hunter 4 save files. This version was released in North America and Europe as Monster Hunter 4 Ultimate on February 13, 2015. The new version of the game was released alongside the New Nintendo 3DS in all regions except Australia, and in addition to the separate game release, it is available bundled with a 3DS XL variant of the newer console model.

== Gameplay ==
As with the other games in the series, Monster Hunter 4 has the player take the role of a new Hunter that undertakes quests and challenges to hunt dangerous creatures that inhabit various locales. As they proceed through these quests, they will gain various items, in-game money, and other rewards that are used to craft new weapons, armor, additional gear, and health, restoration, and temporary buffing items that can be taken into later quests. The player's character does not intrinsically improve over the course of the game, but their abilities are set by the weapon and armor they carry into the quests, which improve as the player takes on more challenging quests. The game allows the player to use any of the fourteen basic weapon types in the game, each having unique battle approaches that the player must master, and can switch between these weapons before departing on quests.

When on a quest, the player is taken to a remote location made up of several smaller areas, where both passive and aggressive creatures roam. The player can explore through these areas, taking the time to accumulate materials such as ores, bugs, and plant parts used to make gear and potions, or by slaying creatures throughout the areas. Some quests allow the player to explore the area as long as they want to accumulate goods, while other quests have the player attempt to slay a number of smaller creatures. The bulk of the quests in the game requiring hunting one or more of the larger monsters that can inhabit the areas, and ending the quest by killing or trapping the creature. These quests are limited by time, as well as the resources available to player. The character can fall in battle due to loss of health twice, causing the player to continue the quest from the starting area, but after falling a third time, the quest is considered failed, as is running out of time. The player can also quit out of any quest at any time, forgoing any rewards for it, but also retaining the items used.

The player's health and stamina are limiting factors on the field. The character's health is lost due to taking damage but can be restored by health potions. Stamina depletes with many actions including running or using their weapon, and if this runs low, the character will slow down or even stop until their stamina is restored. Stamina will be restored normally by doing less aggressive actions. The maximum stamina will drain over time, and though some can be restored through various health items, low stamina can limit the player's effectiveness on the field.

New to Monster Hunter 4 is movement and combat that places more emphasis on three-dimensional movement. Walls can be climbed more fluidly, and players can use height advantages to jump on and attack or even mount creatures. The game also eliminates underwater sections that were present in Monster Hunter 3. The monsters are terrain-aware and use the environment to their advantage. Two new weapons have been added: the Insect Glaive and the Charge Blade.

The game's director, Kaname Fujioka, stated that Monster Hunter 4 has a larger focus on adventure and story progression than previous Monster Hunter titles. Multiple base camps unlock as the player progresses, creating the largest cast of NPCs of any Monster Hunter game to date.

Monster Hunter 4 is the first Monster Hunter game appearing on a handheld to feature fully integrated online multiplayer. Previous titles in the series on PSP and 3DS consoles only allowed local area connections, although online play was possible by linking through a PlayStation 3 or Wii U console.

A new "Guild Quest" system has been added. Guild Quests feature different missions for each player, and will generate random equipment with slightly altered stats. In order to access more weapons and armor, players must trade their Guild Quests with other players using Guild Cards or the StreetPass function. Up to 50 missions can be saved for future use. The solo counterpart to Guild Quests—the "Exploration Missions"—generates a different map and different equipment each time it is played. Some of the equipment is unique to Guild Quests and Exploration, and features old armor designs from monsters that appeared in previous installments of the series but that do not appear in Monster Hunter 4, including but not limited to old Khezu, Rathian, and Rathalos armor sets, and the Barroth Great Sword.

On April 8th, 2024, the online servers for all 3DS and Wii U software were disconnected, meaning online cooperative play is no longer available. Players are still able to engage in quests and the trading of Guild Quests through local cooperative play.

== Plot ==
The player's character is a fledgling Hunter, on the way to the port town of Val Habar via sandship as to become part of the Hunters's Guild. The ship is attacked by a giant Dah'ren Mohran, a sand dwelling Elder Dragon, and the Hunter is able to protect the ship long enough before the Guild's Ace Hunters arrive to drive the beast away. Safely in town, one of the ship's passengers, the Caravaneer, introduces himself to the Hunter, and describes his Capital Caravan, consisting of him, a blacksmith simply known as The Man, and a guild stewardess. Impressed by the Hunter's capabilities, he invites the Hunter to join the Caravan as they try to discover the purpose of a strange artifact the Caravaneer found years earlier which he calls the Article and is attempting to reach Cathar to speak to their wise people about it. The Hunter helps to enlist the aid of a cook and a merchant as to be able to make for their next port of call, the volcanic village of Harth, the home to the Troverians, a dwarf-like race of blacksmiths.

The Troverians are willing to aid the Caravan to build them an ocean-worthy ship. The Hunter helps to clear monsters that have prevents the Troverians from properly working their kilns, and the Hunter's abilities are recognized by the Ace Hunters as they pass through. As they prepare to leave, the daughter of the Troverian chief offers to come along as to learn from the Caravan's smith, The Man. The Caravan sets the ocean on their new ship, the Arluq, but are attacked by a mysterious black dragon, Gore Magala. The Hunter attempts to defend the ship but is infected with a strange disease from Gore Magala that diminishes their combat potential, though by attacking the creature they manage to fight off the disease. Though the beast is driven away with the help of the Ace Hunters, the Caravan's ship is damaged and arrives at Cheeko Sands to effect repairs. The Ace Hunters then inform the Caravan that Cathar is not an island in the ocean, but a village high up in the mountains. The Caravan gain help of the local Palico citizens with the Hunter's help. As they near completion, they learn that the Ace Hunters were sent by the Guild to stop Gore Magala but two of its members never made it back. After the Hunter rescues the two missing members from Gore Magala, the Guild entrusts the task to the Hunter, who successfully defeats the monster, which flees after the fight.

With the Caravan able to travel again, the Caravaneer suggests they return to Harth and ask for help to convert the Arluq to an airship. With the modifications, the Caravan finally reaches Cathar. They are told that the Article is a bad omen that caused a calamity in the nearby mountains. The Hunter, in aiding the Cathar residents, learns that the disease that Gore Magala had carried has started to spread to other monsters, driving them into a frenzy-like state before dying out a few days later. The Ace Hunters arrive in Cathar to inform the Caravan about the "Frenzy Virus" and that the original Gore Magala had suddenly vanished, having shed its skin to become its adult form, a much more dangerous golden Elder Dragon, Shagaru Magala. The Hunter takes on the beast when it threatens Cathar, and on its demise, finds that the Article is a scale taken from Shagaru Magala.

With the threat seemingly ended, the Caravan is surprised to learn that the Guild needs their help in the capital city of Dundorma, where another powerful monster, Kushala Daora, a metallic skinned Elder Dragon, has been spotted. The Caravan helps to secure the city's defense in anticipation of an attack by the dragon. While the Hunter searches for materials to build a weapon against the Elder Dragon, numerous rare golden Wyverns known as the Seregios have suddenly made frequent appearances all over the world. The Ace Hunters are dispatched to investigate the anomaly, only to discover the resurgence of the Frenzy Virus. Further investigations reveal these two events are caused by a Seregios that has gone Apex, a frenzied monster that had overcome the virus' fatal afflictions while possessing even greater power. However, as the Hunter goes out to hunt the Apex Seregios, the Kushala Daora begins assaulting Dundorma. The Ace Hunters manage to successfully defend the city when the Hunter returns, and with their combined efforts they use the newly created weapon to drive away the Elder Dragon.

== Development ==
Monster Hunter 4, like previous titles in the series, was primarily developed for a Japanese audience; though previous games had been localized for release in English-speaking markets, no localized version had broken over one million units sold.

On starting the development of Monster Hunter 4 Ultimate, the Westernized version of the game, Andrew Alfonzo, the localization director for Capcom, wanted to strive to make the title appeal to the Western audience more than previous games, and had his team involved early on during the game's development process to provide input and start localization. Alfonzo spent time researching the differences between Western and Japanese players, which showed that Western players tended to be older than those playing the Japanese versions. He further spent time to understand how business decisions are made in Japan as to be able to better communicate his team's suggestions to the lead developers. Some of the team's suggestions required altering some aspects of the game that would meet gameplay expectations of Western gamers, such as changing loading screen information to provide useful tips rather than narrative information, and changing the pace of the introductory quests that act as tutorials for the game. They also wanted to trim the length of some of the dialog segments, and provide a means for players to skip over the introductory tutorial or allow helpful messages to be turned on or off. Not all changes that Alfonzo's team suggested were made by the Japanese developers, but many of these did make it into the final released version both in Japan and in the Western releases. For localization, Alfonzo wanted to stay away from the use of memes, believing that they would not age well with the game. Alfonzo's team also crafted a social media campaign prior to the game's Western release that helped to introduce potential players to gameplay concepts. As Monster Hunter 4 Ultimate sold well in excess of one million copies, and that the game's improved learning curve was well received by reviewers, Alfonzo believed that his team did the best job to create a "smart localization" given that they did not have direct control on the game's ultimate development, but found ways to evoke change on the "tangibles" in the process.

=== Release ===
On December 19, 2012, Capcom posted a notice on the official page, changing the release date to Summer 2013 and stating that "further quality enhancements are needed in order to meet the expectations and wishes of users."

On May 30, 2013, it was announced that two Special Edition Nintendo 3DS XL consoles would be released on the same date as the game in Japan (the "Gore Magala black version 3DS" and the "Felyne white version 3DS").

On June 3, 2013, Capcom announced different editions for their game, exclusive to the e-Capcom store. The "complete set" includes a strap, a figure, a pouch, and the game.

A limited edition Monster Hunter 4 Ultimate themed version of the New Nintendo 3DS XL launched on February 13, 2015, in North America.

Following the launch of Monster Hunter 4 Ultimate, Capcom released a free downloadable starter pack via Nintendo eShop. The pack contains various items and allows the player to forge Super Mario themed equipment. In March 2015, Capcom released a second set of downloadable content featuring new quests and The Legend of Zelda themed equipment.

== Reception ==
=== Critical reception ===
Reception
Scores for Ultimate unless otherwise noted

Aggregate score
Aggregator	Score
Metacritic	86/100

Review scores
Publication	Score
Destructoid	9/10
Famitsu	38/40 (Monster Hunter 4); 36/40 (Ultimate)
Game Informer	8.75/10
GameRevolution	4/5
GameSpot	9/10
GamesRadar+	4.5/5
Hardcore Gamer	4/5
IGN	9/10
Nintendo Life	9/10
Polygon	8.5/10
The Guardian	4/5
USgamer	4.5/5
Metro	8/10

Upon release, Monster Hunter 4 Ultimate received positive reviews, with numerous critics calling it the best title in the series so far. Review aggregator website Metacritic assigned scores of 86/100. Japanese gaming magazine Famitsu gave the game overwhelming scores. Destructroid gave a score of 9/10 calling the game a hallmark of excellence. GameSpot praised the game by stating "Monster Hunter 4 Ultimate manages to expand upon the things that people love about the series, while simultaneously making concessions to those getting involved for the first time. It's an absolutely astonishing time-sink, but it rarely feels like a grind; when the game gets its hooks into you, you can expect to find yourself engrossed for at least 80 hours. Those who become truly invested can expect to find their in-game clock running into the hundreds of hours. Sure, Monster Hunter 4 Ultimate isn't without some of the series' time-honoured idiosyncrasies, but it's the most streamlined and accessible game yet, and one that's hard not to truly obsess over." Gamesradar agrees their statement by saying "Monster Hunter 4 Ultimate doesn't offer much new beyond its predecessors, but it perfects so much of what they tried that it's undoubtedly the series' best, and among the best games on 3DS." USgamer gave a score of 4.5 out of 5 and stated "Monster Hunter 4 Ultimate is simply the most approachable and playable version of Capcom's action-RPG to date—but be warned, it still requires a hefty investment. If you're willing to take the leap, though, you'll soon understand why Monster Hunter has become such a phenomenon." Metro calls Monster Hunter 4 the best in the series so far.

=== Sales ===
Monster Hunter 4 sold more than 1.8 million copies in its first two days on the market. By the end of 2013, it had sold 3.9 million copies in Japan, more than double any other game in the region except for Pokémon X and Y. As of March 31, 2014, the game has sold 4.1 million copies. The enhanced Monster Hunter 4G was a launch title for the New Nintendo 3DS revision in Japan. Released on October 11, 2014, the game sold 1.6 million copies in its first two days alone. As of November 2014, the game has sold 2.2 million copies. It was reported in Capcom's consolidated financial report on February 3 that the game had sold 2.7 million copies since its release in Japan. Shortly following its North American release, Capcom announced that the title had shipped more than 3 million units worldwide. In Monster Hunter 4 Ultimate's first month on sale in North America, 290,000 combined physical and downloaded copies were sold, making it the fastest-selling Monster Hunter title in that region. In April 2015, Capcom announced that Monster Hunter 4 Ultimate was the first title in the series to surpass one million units shipped in Europe and North America. As of October 2015, Monster Hunter 4 Ultimate has sold more than 4 million units worldwide.

=== Awards ===
List of awards and nominations
Award	Category	Result	Ref.
The Game Awards 2015	Best Mobile/Handheld Game	Nominated	
