= Monster Hunter Wilds =

- Cover art, featuring the game's flagship monster, the Arkveld
- Developer: Capcom
- Publisher: Capcom
- Directors: Yuya Tokuda; Takuro Hiraoka (Ascendance)
- Producers: Ryozo Tsujimoto; Hironobu Takeshita; Genki Sunano; Yuki Matsuzaki
- Designer: Yugo Togawa
- Programmers: Kota Fukasawa; Yuichi Ito
- Artist: Kaname Fujioka
- Writer: Shino Okamura
- Composer: Miwako Chinone
- Series: Monster Hunter
- Engine: RE Engine
- Platforms: Nintendo Switch 2; PlayStation 5; Windows; Xbox Series X/S
- Release: PlayStation 5, Windows, Xbox Series X/S; February 28, 2025; Nintendo Switch 2; December 4, 2026
- Genre: Action role-playing
- Modes: Single-player, multiplayer

Monster Hunter Wilds is a 2025 action role-playing game developed and published by Capcom. A successor to Monster Hunter: World (2018), the game was released worldwide for PlayStation 5, Windows and Xbox Series X/S, with support for cross-platform play, on February 28, 2025. A Nintendo Switch 2 version is currently in development, scheduled for release on December 4, 2026.

As with other Monster Hunter games, Wilds has the player control a hunter that is part of a guild assigned to explore the Forbidden Lands, a nearly uninhabitable area with multiple biomes and dangerous storms. During their exploration, the hunters are assigned quests to fight large monsters that threaten their group, either by killing or capturing them. The hunter can then collect resources from their victories, as well as from gathering in the field, to synthesize new weapons and armor with better attributes that allow the hunter to fight stronger monsters. The player has an option of using fourteen different weapon types in combat, each with different combat maneuvers. New to Wilds is the ability to carry up to two weapons into the field using their mounted bird-like Seikrets to swap gear, the ability to set up pop-up camps within the game's open world to create a more seamless hunting experience, and a wound system that allows the player to target weak points on a monster to inflict more damage. The game can be played as a single-player experience or online with up to three additional players during quests. Wilds is the first in the series to support cross-platform play between all versions.

Within three days of release, Wilds sold more than 8 million copies, making it Capcom's fastest-selling game to date. It received generally positive reviews, with praise towards the stronger focus on story and updates to the open world, though the technical aspects of the game received criticism, especially on Windows.

A major expansion pack, Monster Hunter Wilds: Ascendance, is scheduled for release in 2027.

== Gameplay ==
In the game, the player can ride on Seikret to explore the game's world.

Similar to its predecessor, Wilds is an action role-playing video game played from a third-person perspective. In Wilds, players take on the role of a custom hunter character who travels to the "Forbidden Lands", a distant, unexplored landmass with an ecosystem filled with unique monsters. As with previous games in the series, the player's hunter tracks and fights monsters, either capturing or slaying them, from which they gain rewards in the form of monster parts and other resources. Along with other resources collected in the game world, the player can then craft new armor, weapons, consumables, and other gear, which allow them to fight more difficult monsters.

The game world features several biomes, each of which is a large open world for players to freely explore. In Wilds, players can seamlessly move between the larger world and their hunter village where they can cook food, replenish their supplies, and craft new gear. Quests can also be started whenever players locate their targets in the wilds. The game introduces a type of mount called a Seikret which aids player exploration and directs them towards their current objective, and can also be ridden while in combat. The Seikret allows the player character to carry two distinct weapons while hunting monsters, though armor can only be changed in the village.

All 14 types of weapons from World return in Wilds, though new moves and actions have been introduced. The Slinger also returns in Wilds with new features added, allowing players to grab items from afar and trigger environmental hazards. The game features a "focus mode", enabling players to launch targeted attacks against specific body parts of a monster. Wounds on a monster can be further exploited to deal extra damage. Wounds are created by repeatedly striking a specific monster body part until visible scarring appears; once opened, wounds can be targeted using Focus Mode and destroyed with a Focus Strike — a powerful weapon-specific attack that deals greatly increased damage and staggers the monster. Monsters in the game will interact with each other, with predators hunting prey and certain monsters exhibiting herd behaviors to better protect themselves. Environmental factors such as weather and time of day influence monster behavior, with certain species appearing only under specific conditions.

The game supports four-player cooperative multiplayer, though players who prefer to play solo can enlist the help of three support hunters controlled by artificial intelligence to aid them. As with World, a player can launch an SOS flare to bring either these live or computer-controlled allies to aid in the middle of a hunt. In a first for the series, the game supports cross platform play between the console and computer versions, allowing players on disparate gaming system to hunt together. The game includes an option for players with arachnophobia by replacing models of spider-like creatures with amorphous blobs, though this does not apply to large monsters, such as Nerscylla.

== Plot ==
A group of explorers led by former hunter Fabius finds a boy named Nata in the wasteland. Nata claims to hail from the Forbidden Lands, a harsh, uncharted region of the Old World that was presumed to be uninhabited. Nata's people, the Keepers, were attacked by the "White Wraith", a monster previously thought to be extinct. Fabius summons a recently promoted hunter and their palico to investigate the monster and escort Nata home. The hunter, palico, and Nata are joined by Alma, a guild handler, and Gemma, a blacksmith, forming the Avis Unit. Also on the expedition are the Astrum Unit: Olivia, a veteran hunter, Athos, Olivia's palico, Erik, a botanist, and Werner, a guild engineer.

The Guild explores the Forbidden Lands, finding and assisting the native people against aggressive monsters and abnormal weather. Along their travels, they encounter the White Wraith, revealed to be an albino wyvern with chain-like appendages that kills apex predators by absorbing their life energy.

The Guild discovers that the lands are connected by a mysterious structure called the Landspine, damaged and leaking a white crystalline substance known as wyvern milk, or "wylk", all of which appears tied to the weather in each biome. The Landspine leads them to the ruins of Wyveria, the former capital of an ancient civilization, where Nata is reunited with the Keepers. There, they learn that Wyveria created the Dragontorch, a powerful source of infinite energy which was distributed across the lands via the Landspine, and Guardian Monsters, artificial monsters meant to defend Wyveria. The White Wraith, known as Arkveld, is also a Guardian, but is out of control from absorbing the traits of other monsters, now attacking local fauna and threatening the ecosystem, forcing the hunter to kill it. The group eventually locates the Dragontorch in the ruins, but discovers an angelic, dragon-like Guardian, Zoh Shia, feeding directly from the torch. Zoh Shia was Wyveria's secret weapon, created to defend the empire against an unknown threat, but it turned on them, causing the civilization's fall.

After consulting the Keepers and the Allharken, a Wyverian sage, Avis Unit confronts Zoh Shia, with the hunter slaying it to protect the ecosystem. Afterwards, Nata becomes an apprentice hunter, with the Avis Unit later discovering an Arkveld egg, showing that the species has been reborn.

As Avis Unit continues to research the Forbidden Lands, they discover that Gore Magala, the dark Demi-Elder Dragon that carries the "Frenzy Virus" pathogen (introduced in Monster Hunter 4), has arrived in the lands, spreading the virus to other monsters, causing them to go berserk. Avis Unit is tasked with stemming the spread of the Frenzy Virus alongside the other monsters in the area. Gore Magala is also able to infect the Dragontorch, showing that the artifact is actually a living being. The virus makes the climate unstable and makes the apex predators of all biomes go mad. The hunter helps Fabius kill Gore Magala. Werner and Erik treat the Dragontorch, but are too late to stop Arkveld from being infected. After seeing Arkveld slaughter multiple monsters, Nata begs the hunter to kill it, possibly making the species extinct again. After doing so, the hunter suggests that the new Arkveld may have had time to lay an egg before dying, and agrees to look for it with Nata.

Later, Zoh Shia is found to have mysteriously returned. The hunter slays it once again, after which the Guild theorizes that Zoh Shia is capable of fully reviving itself from even a fragment with a suitable energy source. The Guild decides that while shutting down the Dragontorch will prevent the return of Zoh Shia, it will cause more problems for the region. Instead, the hunter is assigned to watch over Zoh Shia's nest and slay the monster whenever it returns, while the Guild continues to study the Dragontorch.

Later, Werner discovers an ancient underground workshop in the cavernous, volcanic region of the Oil-well Basin beneath the village of Azuz, as well as what he calls a "Wyrmway Nexus", which connects the Dragontorch to the basin's region. However, Erik and Olivia discover a tar-covered elder dragon called Gogmazios, which threatens the ecosystem. In order to protect Azuz and the Dragontorch, the Guild kills Gogmazios.

== Development ==
Wilds was developed by Capcom, using their internal RE Engine. Following the large influx of players from Monster Hunter World, the developers spent more time on research and development to determine what features they wanted to include to meet the wider range of players anticipated for Wilds, according to art director Kaname Fujioka. By 2024, Wilds had been in development for at least five to six years.

The team strove to create a realistic ecosystem and simulate a natural environment in the game. According to Yuya Tokuda, the game's director, players can observe the life forms in the game as they live out their life cycles, and watch how monsters interact with each other. Monsters do not stay in a single location on the map and will instead move around freely. Predators follow prey, and the state of the world is persistent. Players can use the changing environment to their advantage, but the effects of their actions cannot be undone even if they quit the game or return to the settlement. The team also decided to move away from the "excursion" model of previous games and introduce a larger, more seamless world to encourage players to interact with the game's various gameplay systems. To further increase immersion, the player-controlled character, as well as their feline companions (known as a palico) are fully voiced. The team listened to feedback from players of World and Rise, and decided to make exploration more accessible for players through the introduction of mounts that automatically guide players to their target.

Monster Hunter Wilds was announced in December 2023 at The Game Awards. The game released for PlayStation 5, Windows and Xbox Series X/S on February 28, 2025, and was the first game in the series to see simultaneous release on all launch platforms. The game was made available for public demonstration at the 2024 Gamescom show, where it won four show awards selected by attendees, including Most Epic, Most Entertaining, Best PlayStation Game, and Best Trailer.

Downloadable content is planned for the title, though according to Tsujimoto, these will remain as only cosmetic items such as layered armor gear, and will not be "pay-to-win items". Free content updates, referred to as 'Title Updates' are planned to be released free of charge in the future, as with previous Monster Hunter games, with the first releasing in April 2025, with further updates planned in the future. These updates add new monsters with associated gear to craft, new quests and events, and expand the game, such as the addition of a multiplayer Grand Hub to interact with other hunters online, and challenge arena quests. Limited time seasonal events bring further special quests for acquiring new gear associated with the event. As with past Monster Hunter games, limited-time collaborations with other Capcom properties have been introduced, starting with Street Fighter 6 during a May 2025 event. A collaboration with Square Enix's Final Fantasy XIV was released as part of a September 2025 update which sees the Final Fantasy series superboss Omega added as a new monster players can battle, as well as a Chocobo mount.

The open beta for Monster Hunter Wilds, which began on October 26, 2024, attracted over 460,000 concurrent players on Steam, highlighting significant player interest despite some reported technical issues. The game was nominated for Most Anticipated Game at the Game Awards in November 2024.

A major expansion, Monster Hunter Wilds: Ascendance, is scheduled for release in 2027.

== Reception ==
=== Critical response ===
Reception

Aggregate scores
Aggregator	Score
Metacritic	PS5: 88/100; Win: 88/100; XSXS: 90/100
OpenCritic	95% recommend

Review scores
Publication	Score
Destructoid	9.5/10
Edge	7/10
Eurogamer	4/5
Famitsu	39/40
Game Informer	8.75/10
GameSpot	8/10
GamesRadar+	4.5/5
PC Gamer (US)	85/100
PCGamesN	9/10
PCMag	4/5
Push Square	9/10
Shacknews	9/10
TechRadar	4.5/5
Video Games Chronicle	5/5
VG247	5/5

Monster Hunter Wilds received very positive reviews from critics. According to review aggregator platform Metacritic, the PlayStation 5 and Microsoft Windows versions of the game received "generally favourable", based on 104 and 45 critic reviews, respectively, whilst the Xbox Series X version received "universal acclaim", based on 14 critic reviews. OpenCritic determined that 95% of critics recommended the game. In Japan, four critics from Famitsu gave the game a total score of 39 out of 40, with three critics awarding the game a perfect 10.

Reviewers were mixed on the perceived decrease in difficulty present in Wilds; IGN's Tom Marks described the game as "light on any real challenge", and stated that he'd only "fainted two times total across dozens of hours", comparing the experience to far more challenging encounters in the base game of Monster Hunter World. Marks, however, did note that "the easier turning will probably get more people through the door." Harte referred to the game's campaign as "easy, but not boring." Eurogamer's Matt Wales also noted that, whilst noting he was a series veteran, he had "still haven't failed a quest forty hours in", pondering if the games "aggressive streamlining" was "robbing the series of some of its distinctive personality." Edge criticized the post-credits gameplay as not having "the same self-sustaining impetus" as other games in the series, attributed in part to the game's streamlining.

Many reviewers positively noted Wilds' as having a greater focus on its story and narrative; Destructoid's Kristina Ebanez (who gave the game 9.5 out of 10) referred to Nata's story as "captivating", whilst Game Informer's Charles Harte (who rated the game 8.75 out of 10) was "pleasantly surprised" and said the story "kept me invested throughout the campaign." Conversely, Wales stated "the story campaign isn't an entirely terrible way to spend 20 hours" but generally bemoaned the large number of cutscenes.

At launch, the game received mixed reviews from users on Steam, with players reporting numerous technical issues affecting Wilds' performance, graphics, and frame-rate, even on high-end PCs. Through July 2025, user reviews for the Windows version of Wilds on Steam continued to trend downward and had reached "Overwhelming Negative". Though some of these reviews were based on the apparent lack of content in Wilds, most of these negative reviews were concerned about the poor performance of the game since its launch. Tokuda had said they were aware of these issues at launch, and while both Title Updates 1 and 2 were aimed to improve the game's performance on Windows, users still reported many issues and continued to drive negative reviews of the game while leading players to return to Monster Hunter World. Capcom reported that members of the game's development team were being harassed online due to these complaints, and pulled their participation in an upcoming Japanese developer conference.

The game continued to garner negative player feedback through July 2025, with players still critical of the performance on Windows and the apparent lack of content, and which led to slow sales. Capcom pushed up the release of a major patch that introduced more end game content by a month in July 2025, which journalists suggested was to try to address player concerns. Capcom acknowledged that the Windows version needed optimization and said in August 2025 that the fourth free title update, planned for early 2026, is expected to include CPU and GPU optimization, with refinements to occur in following patches and updates. A major patch released in January 2026 included many of these PC engine improvements, including more options for the user to control CPU and GPU settings, as well as a bug found by a user that had also existed in Dragon's Dogma 2 where the game would constantly check for ownership of downloadable content during camp sections.

=== Sales ===
According to Capcom, Monster Hunter Wilds sold over eight million units in the three days following the game's launch, making it the fastest selling game in Capcom's history. Capcom claimed that the success was due to advertising the game to a broad worldwide audience and holding online beta tests prior to the launch of the game. By the end of March 2025, it had reached ten million sales. and by September 2026 it sold over 12.2 million.

In Japan, Wilds set the record for the largest physical sales launch of any PlayStation 5 title, selling 601,179 copies in its first week.

On the day of release, over 1.3 million concurrent users had played Wilds on Steam, the highest concurrent Steam player count for any Capcom game, and the sixth-highest for any game on Steam to date. The following day, the game reached over 1.38 million concurrent players on Steam, which established it as the fifth highest game by this metric. It was the fourth best-selling game of 2025 in the US.

During Capcom's financial quarter from April to June 2025, Wilds sold only 477 thousand units, falling behind sales of older Capcom games during the same period, such as Devil May Cry 5, which saw a resurgence due to the release of the animated series during this period. As a result, the slow sales for Wilds contributed to a drop in Capcom's share price.

=== Awards ===
Year	Award	Category	Result	Ref.
2025	Japan Game Awards	Award for Excellence	Won	
2025	Golden Joystick Awards	Console Game of the Year	Nominated	
2025	The Game Awards 2025	Best Role Playing Game	Nominated	
2026	29th Annual D.I.C.E. Awards	Role-Playing Game of the Year	Nominated	
2026	29th Annual D.I.C.E. Awards	Outstanding Achievement in Animation	Nominated	
