= Monster Hunter Rise =

2021 video game

- Cover art, featuring the game's flagship monster, Magnamalo
- Developer: Capcom
- Publisher: Capcom
- Director: Yasunori Ichinose
- Producers: Ryozo Tsujimoto; Akihito Kadowaki
- Designer: Katsuhiro Eguchi
- Programmer: Kazunori Sawada
- Artist: Hiroshi Sato
- Writer: Hiroshi Yamashita
- Composer: Satoshi Hori
- Series: Monster Hunter
- Engine: RE Engine
- Platforms: Nintendo Switch; Windows; PlayStation 4; PlayStation 5; Xbox One; Xbox Series X/S; iOS; Android
- Release: Nintendo Switch; March 26, 2021; Windows; January 12, 2022; PS4, PS5, Xbox One, Xbox Series X/S; January 20, 2023; iOS, Android; October 7, 2026
- Genre: Action role-playing
- Modes: Single-player, multiplayer

Monster Hunter Rise (Note: Japanese: モンスターハンターライズ, Hepburn: Monsutā Hantā Raizu) is a 2021 action role-playing game in the Monster Hunter series, developed and published by Capcom for the Nintendo Switch. It was released worldwide in March 2021, with a Windows port released in January 2022 and ports for PlayStation 4, PlayStation 5, Xbox One, and Xbox Series X/S were released in January 2023. Mobile versions were soft-launched in October 2026. An expansion pack, Sunbreak, was released in June 2022.

Rise follows many of the new conventions established in Monster Hunter: World while also introducing new features and mechanics, including a new animal companion called a Palamute that can be used to ride across the map or into battle, and the use of Wirebugs to traverse the world and mount and ride certain monsters. The game received generally positive reviews upon release with critics praising the gameplay and its expansion of the mechanics introduced in World. It has sold more than 20 million copies worldwide since launch, making it the second best-selling game in the series. Sunbreak has sold more than 8 million copies since launch.

== Gameplay ==
Hunters defending themselves from monsters in the new Rampage mode. One hunter using a Wirebug (in bright blue) in combat can be seen in the center.

As with previous Monster Hunter titles, Monster Hunter Rise has the player take the role of a Hunter, tasked with slaying or capturing large monsters using a variety of weapons, tools, and environmental features to damage and weaken them while surviving their attacks. Successful completion of the offered quests provides loot, typically in the form of various monster parts from the monster, which are used to forge new armor and weapons that can be used to take on more powerful monsters, forming the series' notable core loop. Several of the series' monsters return along with a host of new monsters developed for Rise. All fourteen weapon types that have been present in both Monster Hunter Generations and World, which mix archetypes of swords, shields, staves, bows, and guns, are present in Rise.

Rise uses the same seamless map approach introduced in Monster Hunter: World unlike the zoned areas typical of earlier games in the series. Its maps are more focused on vertical movement than previous games, as implied by its title, so new tools are given to the player to help with quick vertical scaling. The Wirebug, similar to the Clutch Claw added in Monster Hunter World: Iceborne, allows a player to grapple and swing across gaps or to higher locations as needed. The Wirebug also has different interactions with each weapon type, adding to that weapon's set of moves and combos. Further, the Wirebug allows a player to engage certain monsters in Wyvern Riding, letting the hunter mount and control the creature to a limited degree as to either lead it into areas more amenable for combat or to engage in combat with a different monster.

Palamutes are new dog-like companion creatures in Rise. The player can ride them to quickly navigate the map without losing stamina. Additionally, Palamutes can quickly scale cliffs and perform attacks while fighting monsters alongside the player's other companion option, the cat-like Palicoes, who return from previous games.

Rise features both single player and local and online multiplayer modes with up to four hunters in a group. In single player modes, the player hunts with up to two of any combination of the Palico or Palamute companions. In the online modes, players selects up to one of either the Palico or Palamute to join them.

In addition to the series' typical hunts, Rise introduces Rampage, a tower defense mode where the players must defend the base village from several attacking monsters. Prior to and during the attack, the players can set up siege weapons and instruct non-player characters to attack the monsters while the players attack the monsters directly.

Besides incorporation of new content such as new monsters and locales, the expansion Sunbreak adds in a Switch Skills Swap feature that allows the player to switch between two different skill sets while in the middle of a hunt without returning to a base camp. Current non-player characters in the hunting hubs can be befriended by the hunter character and then become companions that join the player for hunts.

== Plot ==
=== Rise arc ===
In Kamura Village the player-character is informed they have been promoted to a Hunter by the Guild by the Wyverian twins Hinoa and Minoto. They escort the new Hunter to the village leader Fugen, though along the way, the Hunter catches sight of an unknown flying monster far in the distance. Fugen congratulates the Hunter on their success, but warns that they have been alerted about pending signs of "The Rampage", a mysterious calamity that occurred fifty years ago where a large horde of monsters attacked the village in a frenzied rage. Fugen tasks the Hunter to prepare themselves for a possible recurrence of the Rampage by helping with various quests to protect and supply the village with goods while building up their hunting. Further signs of the Rampage emerge, and Fugen instructs the Hunter to go to the Stronghold, a battleground that guards the gates to Kamura. After repelling the attack, the Hunter, Yomogi, the village chef, and Iori, the "Buddy Handler", are suddenly attacked by a tiger-like, mace-tailed fanged wyvern, forcing them to retreat. Fugen tells the trio that the monster is known as "Magnamalo" who appears alongside the Rampage and feeds on monsters of the horde. Under Fugen's orders, the Hunter slays Magnamalo. Upon returning to the village, Fugen and Hinoa congratulate the Hunter on their victory. Fugen then gives the Hunter his Long Sword, which has been passed down in Kamura for generations.

After repelling another Rampage attack, as Hinoa wonders how long the Rampage is going to last, suddenly the same flying serpentine dragon-like monster that the Hunter saw earlier appears. Hinoa resonates with the monster's thoughts, calling for its "queen", before regaining her senses. The monster is later identified as an Elder Dragon known as the Wind Serpent, Ibushi. After Ibushi is repelled, the group begins to question who Ibushi's "queen" is. Master Utsushi, the village's lookout, discovers who Ibushi's "queen" is: the Thunder Serpent, Narwa, who is Ibushi's female counterpart and mate. Further research from the guild reveals the origins of Ibushi and Narwa. Every fifty years, Ibushi, as well as Narwa, will emerge to mate with each other; in order to do so, Ibushi will wander the land to seek out Narwa. Ibushi is also known to cause destructive storms by sending dragon energy into the ground. This turbulence is strong enough to uproot trees and wipe out the landscape. This causes nearby monsters to become terrified and flee directly into Kamura Village. Meanwhile, Narwa seems to wait in a location she prefers until Ibushi is able to locate her. However, the disturbance caused by her presence and electromagnetic abilities tend to drive other monsters berserk, leading to a rampage event that regularly hits Kamura Village during the Serpent's mating process. This information reveals that the actions of the Serpent Elder Dragons are the primary cause of the Rampage. Due to the fact that Narwa had wiped out most of the village's hunters, they call on the Hunter to slay Narwa. After a fierce battle with the Thunder Serpent, Narwa is seemingly killed when she falls to her death. Narwa's corpse is not found, however, causing Fugen to believe that Narwa is still alive. At night, the Hunter witnesses Hinoa and Minoto (possessed by Ibushi and Narwa) talking to one other, saying that their offspring will roam across the earth.

After fending off various elder dragons, the Hunter is told that Narwa and Ibushi have returned and finally united. Fugen calls on the Hunter to confront the two serpents and end the Rampage for good. The Hunter battles Ibushi, whose life force is devoured by Narwa, transforming her into Narwa the Allmother, greatly enhancing her power. The Hunter faces Narwa again and is aided by the unexpected arrival of Magnamalo, who attacks the Thunder Serpent. After a destructive battle, the Hunter slays Narwa and returns to the village. Fugen names the Hunter the Savior of Kamura as the village celebrates with a great feast and Hinoa states that the village is finally at peace.

=== Sunbreak arc ===
After the end of the Rampage, the hunter is hailed as a hero and peace returns to Kamura. This peace turns out to be short-lived, as a hermit crab-like monster, a Daimyo Hermitaur arrives in the shrine ruins. The Hunter and Utsushi investigate and slay the Hermitaur but a new, strange werewolf-like monster suddenly appears out of nowhere and attacks the two. They are unable to defeat it until the arrival of a knight from Elgado named Fiorayne, who repels the monster, then explains that the monster is a Lunagaron from the kingdom of Elgado.

Fiorayne shares that her purpose in Kamura is to recruit the Hunter to help the people of Elgado face a trio of monsters called the Three Lords. One of the Three Lords, a vampyric elder dragon known as Malzeno, is believed to be making the monsters more aggressive and driving them out of the kingdom. As the monsters from Elgado are now threatening Kamura as well, Fugen accepts Fiorayne's request and allows the Hunter to travel to Elgado in order to meet its commander and defeat Malzeno.

Arriving in Elgado, the Hunter meets Admiral Galleus and his allies. The Hunter and Fiorayne soon face the first of the Three Lords, the hulking, armored fanged beast, Garangolm, and defeat it. The Hunter and Elgado's lead scientist, Bahari, encounter a species of glowing red moth-like creatures called Qurio. Bahari believes the Qurio may somehow be responsible for the madness plaguing the monsters of Elgado. The Hunter and Fiorayne soon face Lunagaron again, who is the second of the Three Lords, and defeat it as well, but are ambushed by Malzeno, who seems to be commanding the Qurio. Malzeno poisons Fiorayne with a virus from the Qurio as it departs.

With Fiorayne's life in danger, the Hunter seeks out a doctor named Tadori, who is able to create a cure for the virus. Now convinced Malzeno is the source of the Qurio, Galleus commands the Hunter and Fiorayne to defeat the dragon once and for all. The Hunter and Fiorayne confront Malzeno in Elgado's destroyed citadel and slay it, causing a swarm of Qurio to fly away from its corpse. The threat seemingly ended, the people of Elgado begin to relax, but Galleus is concerned something else is at work and begins construction of a fleet of ships armed with dragonators.

Although the Qurio have lost their host, they have begun killing monsters around the kingdom. The Hunter and Fiorayne find the citadel littered with the corpses of monsters, their life energy drained by the Qurio. The Qurio swarm gathers as a large pit opens from beneath the ocean near Elgado. An enormous demonic monster emerges from the pit, causing an earthquake. Before the creature can cause any more destruction, Galleus arrives with his fleet and forces it back into the pit. Galleus and Bahari reveal to the Hunter and Fiorayne that the creature was the "Archdemon of the Abyss", dubbed Gaismagorm by the Guild, a legendary monster that is said to rise up from underground and destroy the world. They also reveal that, based on their research, Gaismagorm is the true source of the Qurio responsible for sending them out to gather energy in order to free itself from beneath the sea. As Malzeno wasn't affected by the Qurio, it rivaled Gaismagorm and stalled its release. With Malzeno dead, nothing is able to stop the Archfiend from emerging.

Galleus gathers his ships and orders the Hunter and Fiorayne to descend into the pit to slay the creature. Within the pit, a destructive battle follows, with Galleus providing artillery fire to aid the Hunter. With his help, the Hunter and Fiorayne bring down Gaismagorm, causing the Qurio to begin to die. Reuniting with Galleus, the Hunter and their allies return to Elgado, where the people of both the kingdom and Kamura are celebrating their victory. Galleus and Bahari inform the Hunter that though their source is gone, the remaining Qurio are still a threat. Fiorayne asks the Hunter to stay with her in Elgado and continue to fight with her to protect the kingdom.

Some time later, Kagero learns of the arrival of the massive, serpentine elder dragon, Amatsu, who was responsible for the destruction of his hometown Tsukito City, and goes to seek revenge. Yomogi intervenes and both are saved when the Hunter and Utsushi arrive, slaying Amatsu. Kagero expresses gratitude to the Hunter for avenging his homeland.

After defeating Amatsu, Galleus and Bahari find a Malzeno that has not yet been infected by the Qurio, which the Guild dubs Primordial Malzeno. They become suspicious that Malzeno is killing the Qurio as Fiorayne assists the Hunter to fight the dragon once again. During the search, however, the Hunter and Fiorayne learn that this Malzeno is attempting to kill the Qurio in order to prevent them from infecting it, and so the duo resolve to save Malzeno by slaying the Qurio. Malzeno, now silently amicable toward the Hunter and Fiorayne, flies away in peace to protect the kingdom alongside them.

== Development ==
The game's producer, Ryozo Tsujimoto, said that with both World and Rise, they wanted to move away from the use of traditional numbering for the main titles in the Monster Hunter series and instead name them based on a central concept that the game was built around; "Rise" was chosen to reflect the verticality of the game's levels and gameplay elements. The verticality resulted in level design that resembled a medieval Japanese/Far Eastern aesthetic, which had not been an initial goal of the design team but was happenstance from their design. The game's director, Yasunori Ichinose, had previously directed Monster Hunter Portable 3rd, a title that had never been released outside of Asia; Portable 3rd featured Yukumo Village as its hub location, a Japanese-inspired setting with hot springs, and which reappeared in Monster Hunter Generations. Ichinose did not want to reuse Yukumo Village for Rise but wanted a similar setting, one that could be considered in the same region, and designed Rise's hub, Kamura Village, with similar concepts as Yukumo. Further, this setting helped with Rise's approach to more freedom of movement, much like that of ninjas, according to Ichinose, which also worked well with that setting.

Rise's pre-planning development started after the completion of Generations and Generations Ultimate, and was co-developed alongside World, with ideas being shared between the two development teams. The game was built with the RE Engine that was originally developed for Resident Evil 7: Biohazard and since been used for other Capcom games like the Resident Evil 2 remake and Devil May Cry 5. As this was the first time this engine was used for a game of this type, it delayed some of the production as they worked to assure smooth gameplay within World's zoneless approach on the Switch. Furthermore, the Palamute companion was developed with the portability of the Nintendo Switch in mind, eliminating the depletion of stamina as the player rode it around the game world. According to Ichinose, due to the specs of the Nintendo Switch, it would have been easier to use data from the 3DS era but since Monster Hunter: World was released recently, it was important to make Rise look as modern as possible. Natsuki Hanae provides the game's narration.

== Release ==
Monster Hunter Rise was announced during a Nintendo Direct Mini: Partner Showcase broadcast on September 17, 2020 for a worldwide release on March 26, 2021. Alongside its release, Rise included three Amiibo figures: a Palico, Palamute, and the game's flagship monster, Magnamalo. Using the Amiibo unlocks a set of unique layered armor for the player in the game. A month-long demo was released on January 7, 2021, featuring four quests with all fourteen weapons available as well as single player and online multiplayer support. The demo's release briefly caused the Nintendo eShop servers to suffer outages due to its popularity. A second demo was released on March 12, 2021. The game currently has free post-launch content similar to World.

A special edition Nintendo Switch bundle, which includes the console, dock and Joy-Con emblazoned with Rise artwork along with a copy of the game, launched on the same day. Ahead of Rise's release, the crossover game Super Smash Bros. Ultimate included three Monster Hunter-themed Mii Fighter costumes as downloadable content, including the Hunter armor, Rathalos armor, and a Felyne hat. Coinciding with the game's launch, three collectable Spirits based on the Palico, Palamute, and Magnamalo were added to the game.

As with past Monster Hunter games, Rise includes crossover events with other Capcom properties, featuring quests to unlock costumes and other items related to the other franchise. The first crossover event for Rise was with Monster Hunter Stories 2 around the time of the title's release in June 2021. The second crossover event featured Amaterasu from the game Ōkami in July 2021. A third event in August 2021 included the ability to earn a costume based on Akuma from Street Fighter. In September 2021, another crossover event gave the player the ability to earn a palamute costume based on Rush from Mega Man. A fourth crossover event in November 2021 brought outfits based on Sonic the Hedgehog.

According to Tsujimoto, due to demand from players, Capcom planned to develop a Windows version of Rise. The Windows version includes support for high resolution displays up to 4K, higher framerates, and direct voice chat support. While Capcom had evaluated cross-platform play or cross-saving between the Switch and Windows versions, they determined they could not implement these features. The Windows port was released on January 12, 2022, which includes all content that had been released for Rise for the Switch as of November 2021, with a demo available on October 13, 2021.

A major paid expansion, Monster Hunter Rise: Sunbreak, was released for the Switch and PC version of the game on June 30, 2022. It added new monsters, quests, weapons and armor, story elements, and included more difficult Master Rank hunts, similar to past Monster Hunter games. The expansion is centered on a new monster, the Elder Dragon Malzeno, but also brought back monsters from previous iterations of the series. The expansion also introduced new hunting areas and a new hub area for preparations.

In December 2022, Capcom announced that Rise is set to be released for the PlayStation 4, PlayStation 5, Xbox One, and Xbox Series X/S on January 20, 2023. The game was available on Game Pass for Xbox, PC, and Cloud at launch. Cross-play and cross-progression is only supported between PlayStation consoles, or between Windows (Microsoft Store) and Xbox consoles. The voice chat and image filters previously exclusive to the Steam version are included in the ports, and the game runs at 4K 60FPS on PlayStation 5 and Xbox Series X, with an option to target 120 FPS at lower resolution. The Sunbreak expansion followed later on April 28, 2023.

Rise for iOS and Android devices was soft-launched on October 7, 2026, though required a Netflix subscription.

== Reception ==
Reception

Aggregate scores
Aggregator	Score
Metacritic	NS: 88/100; PC: 87/100; PS5: 87/100; XSX: 87/100
OpenCritic	96% recommend 93% recommend(Sunbreak)

Review scores
Publication	Score
Destructoid	9/10
Eurogamer	Essential
Game Informer	7.75/10
GameSpot	9/10
GamesRadar+	4/5
IGN	8/10
Nintendo Life	9/10
Nintendo World Report	9/10
RPGamer	4.5/5
RPGFan	90/100
Shacknews	9/10
The Guardian	4/5
VentureBeat	4/5

Monster Hunter Rise received "generally favorable reviews" from critics, according to review aggregator website Metacritic. OpenCritic determined 96% of critics recommend the game. Critics praised the addition of new tools such as the Wirebugs and the game's expansion of Monster Hunter: World's mechanics.

Sam Machkovech of Ars Technica praised the new movement mechanics and how the game adjusted many monsters from previous entries to compensate for it. He also criticized the game's technical performance saying, "I did run into frenetic battles where the frame rate buckled into the mid-20s." Martin Robinson of Eurogamer appreciated how the game's hunts were shorter than prior games.

Richard Wakeling, writing for GameSpot, enjoyed the new Japanese-styled setting, and the Rampage missions. Ryan Gilliam of Polygon enjoyed the game's increased accessibility for newcomers to the series, and how the player had more ways to approach hunts.

=== Awards and accolades ===
Monster Hunter Rise was nominated for Best Role Playing Game and Best Multiplayer Game at The Game Awards 2021, but lost to Tales of Arise and It Takes Two, respectively. The Sunbreak expansion won the Grand Award prize at the 2023 Japan Game Awards.

=== Sales ===
Capcom has announced that launch shipments of Monster Hunter Rise reached four million units worldwide three days after release. Monster Hunter: World had shipped five million units during the same period after release. It sold over 1.3 million copies within its first week of sale in Japan, and was the bestselling retail game of the week in the country; it also led to a surge in Switch unit sales, more than doubling combined sales of the Switch and Switch Lite compared to prior weeks. By April 27, 2021, six million units had been shipped. Total shipments reached 8 million by January 13, 2022; by March 31, 2022, total sales reached 9 million copies sold. As of July 2022, total worldwide shipments topped 10 million, with Sunbreak alone shipping 2 million copies in five days, and 3 million copies within two weeks of its release. The base Rise game had sold 12 million copies by February 2023, while the Sunbreak expansion had sold 5 million copies by January 2023. As of June 30th 2023, Rise and Sunbreak have sold thirteen million units and six million units worldwide respectively.As of October 2026, Monster Hunter Rise has sold twenty million copies.
