= MH6 =

MH6 may refer to:

- Monster Hunter Wilds
- MD Helicopters MH-6 Little Bird
