= CEDEC Awards =

Annual awards for video games and developers

- Awarded for: Outstanding game developers and games
- Presented by: CESA Developers Conference
- First award: 2008
- Website: cedec.cesa.or.jp

CEDEC Awards are annually presented by Tokyo, Japan-based CEDEC (CESA Developers conference) for outstanding game developers and games. The awards started in 2008.

== Selection process ==
The CEDEC Awards began in 2008, at the "CEDEC 2008" conference, on its 10th anniversary. The main awards were based on suggestions by the public, from which nominations were chosen by the CEDEC advisory board, which were then voted on by the advisory board, and CEDEC students.

== Award list ==
Year	Engineering	Visual Arts	Game Design	Sound	Network	Special Award	Books
2008	MT Framework (Capcom)	Ico	Super Mario series	Legend of Zelda series	Not awarded	Shigeru Miyamoto	Not awarded
2009	Shadow of the Colossus programming team (Sony Computer Entertainment)	Ōkami artist and technical artist (Capcom)	Monster Hunter Portable development team (Capcom)	Rhythm Tengoku Gold development team (Nintendo)	Nico Nico Douga video sharing (Niwango)	Yuji Horii	Sho Hirayama "Technologies that before you become a game programmer"; Haruhisa Ishida "C language"
2010	mycomBASIC magazine editorial department and contributors (Denpa Newspaper Company)	Infinity Ward (Activision / Infinity Ward)	Demon's Souls development team (FromSoftware)	KORG DS-10 series development team (AQ Interactive)	Sekai Camera development team (Tonchi)	Masaya Nakamura	BornDigital Inc & Hiroyuki Kawanishi (Microsoft) (Microsoft)
2011	Unity Engine team (Unity Technologies)	Street Fighter IV design team (Capcom)	Akihiro Hino (Level-5)	CRI ADX2 development team (CRI Middleware)	Amazon EC2/S3 (Amazon Web Services)	Satoshi Tajiri & Tsunekazu Ishihara	Kengo Nakajima "The technology of Online game"
2012	Kinect (Kinect development team)	Journey development team (Thatgamecompany)	Puzzle & Dragons development team (GungHo Online Entertainment)	The Idolmaster series music team (Bandai Namco)	Enchant.js development team (Ubiquitous Entertainment)	Koichi Hamamura	Yosuke Katsura, Marc Salvati, Tatsuo Yotsukura "Technical Artist Start Kit"
2013	Oculus Rift Development Kit	JoJo's Bizarre Adventure ("Kamikaze Video" ja:神風動画)	Kenji Eno	CeVIO Creative Studio dev team	Nintendo DS communication technology team	Ken Kutaragi	Yoshiki Dojima "Technology and ideas to move games"; Masaki Kato "How to make games Unity's play algorithm to remember"
2014	Unreal Engine 4 dev team	Softimage (Autodesk)	Fleet Collection (DMM.com / Kadokawa Games)	Hideki Sakamoto	"PS4 share button" dev team (Sony Computer Entertainment)	Koichi Sugiyama	DeNa "Mobageを支える技術 ～ソーシャルゲームの舞台裏～"
2015	Visual Studio	Guilty Gear Xrd (Arc System Works)	Neko Atsume (Hit-Point)	Super Smash Bros. for Nintendo 3DS and Wii U (Masahiro Sakurai/Sora Ltd./Nintendo)	Ingress (Niantic)	Toru Iwatani / Tomohiro Nishikado (Space Invaders / Pac Man)	大野 功二氏 : "3Dゲームをおもしろくする技術 実例から解き明かすゲームメカニクス・レベルデザイン・カメラのノウハウ" (published SB Creative)
2016	Nvidia GameWorks	Splatoon dev team (Nintendo)	Splatoon dev team (Nintendo)	Splatoon dev team (Nintendo)	-	Yōichi Erikawa, founder Koei, president Koei Tecmo	CGWORLD (japan) magazine, publisher "Born Digital Inc." (株式会社ボーンデジタル)
2017	PlayStation VR	The Legend of Zelda: Breath of the Wild (Nintendo)	The Legend of Zelda: Breath of the Wild (Nintendo)	Nier: Automata (Square Enix/PlatinumGames)	-	Hironobu Sakaguchi	Eske Yoshinob : "マヤ道！！THE ROAD OF MAYA"
2018	The Legend of Zelda: Breath of the Wild (Nintendo)	Nier: Automata (Square Enix/PlatinumGames)	Splatoon 2 (Nintendo)	Persona 5 (Atlus)	-	Yu Suzuki	伊藤 毅志氏 "ゲーム情報学概論 -ゲームを切り拓く人工知能-" (publisher "Corona", ja:コロナ社 (出版社))
2019	Perforce (Perforce Software, Inc.)	Masayoshi Sudo (Atlus)	Nintendo Labo (Nintendo)	Ace Combat 7: Skies Unknown (Bandai Namco Entertainment)	-	Masahiro Sakurai	Jun Matsunaga: チェインクロニクルから学ぶスマートフォンRPGのつくり方
2020	CAPCOM Open Conference RE:2019 Management Team and "RE ENGINE" Development Team (CAPCOM Corporation)	Atsume Animal Crossing Development Team (Nintendo Corporation)	Ring Fit Adventure Development Team (Nintendo Corporation)	Final Fantasy VII Remake Sound Development Team (Square Enix Inc.)	-	Hideo Kojima	-
2021	Ryugaku Studio Dragon Engine Development Team (Sega Corporation)	Ghost of Tsushima Development Team (Sucker Punch Productions)	Eru Deru Waisu Tenho no Sakunahime (Sakuna: Of Rice and Ruin)	Ghost of Tsushima Sound Development Team (Sucker Punch Productions)	-	Mark Cerny	-
2022	Cygames Tech Conference Management Team (Cygames, Inc.)	Elden Ring Development Team (FromSoftware, Inc.)	Elden Ring Development Team (FromSoftware, Inc.)	Uma Musume Pretty Derby Sound Development Team (Cygames, Inc.)	-	Hidetaka Miyazaki	-
2023	Kirby and the Forgotten Land Development Team (Nintendo/HAL Laboratory)	Masahiro Sakurai (Sora Ltd)	Masahiro Sakurai (Sora Ltd)	Hi-Fi RUSH Sound Development Team (Tango Gameworks)	-	The Legend of Zelda Development Team / Eiji Aonuma	-
2024	GitHub Copilot Development Team (GitHub)	Granblue Fantasy Relink Development Team (Cygames Inc.)	The Legend of Zelda: Tears of the Kingdom Development Team (Nintendo Corporation)	Street Fighter 6 Sound Development Team (Capcom Corporation)	-	Akira Sakuma	-
2025	The Legend of Zelda: Tears of the Kingdom Development Team (Nintendo Corporation)	3D People -3dnchu- Yamato3D	Astro Bot Development Team (Team ASOBI)	SILENT HILL 2 Sound Team (Konami Digital Entertainment Inc., Bloober Team S.A.)	-	Nobuo Uematsu	-
2026	Donkey Kong Bananza Development Team (Nintendo Corporation)	Donkey Kong Bananza Development Team (Nintendo Corporation)	Donkey Kong Bananza Development Team (Nintendo Corporation)	Nintendo Music Development and Operations Team (Nintendo Corporation, Nintendo Systems Corporation)	-	Shuhei Yoshida	-

== See also ==
- Japan Game Awards
- Game Developers Choice Awards
