= MT Framework =

Game engine created by Capcom

- Developer: Capcom
- Platform: Windows, Xbox 360, PlayStation 3, Xbox One, PlayStation 4, Nintendo Switch, Wii U, Wii, Nintendo 3DS, PlayStation Vita, iOS, Android
- License: Proprietary

MT Framework is a game engine created by Capcom. "MT" stands for "Multi-Thread", "Meta Tools" and "Multi-Target". While initially MT Framework was intended to power 2006's Dead Rising and Lost Planet: Extreme Condition only, Capcom later decided for their internal development divisions to adopt it as their default engine. As a result, the vast majority of their internally developed video games for the PlayStation 3 and Xbox 360 platforms were created on it, including four new titles and three remastered ports of past titles in the Resident Evil series. The visuals of the first games built with the engine were well received, and MT Framework has also won a CEDEC award.

Throughout the years MT Framework received various updates, most significant of which was a major revision called MT Framework 2.0, introduced with Lost Planet 2 in 2010. Additionally, two offshoots of the engine have been made; MT Framework Lite targets the Wii and PlayStation 3 consoles, and MT Framework Mobile powers games for the Nintendo 3DS, PlayStation Vita, Android and iOS.

As of 2014, Capcom's stance on the future of the engine is that it will continue to be used to create games for the seventh generation of video game consoles, smartphones and handhelds. RE Engine, which was introduced in 2017 with Resident Evil 7: Biohazard, succeeds MT Framework as Capcom's primary proprietary engine. Built upon MT Framework 2.9 version, it was used in the development of games for the eighth and ninth generation of video game consoles and PC.

== History ==
=== Background ===
Before the creation of MT Framework, Capcom's internal development teams were each using engines and tools of their own design, a process that was deemed inefficient. Thus, the decision to build an engine that would support the needs of all of Capcom's developers was made. At first MT Framework was being developed to be used in Dead Rising and Lost Planet: Extreme Condition only. Capcom evaluated the Unreal Engine 3 engine for adoption as their internal engine, but decided against it due to some performance limitations and difficulties of getting technical support from its American developer, Epic Games, in Japan. As such, the decision to further develop MT Framework and extend its internal use was made.

=== MT Framework 1.x ===
Development of MT Framework had begun in September 2004 based on the Onimusha 3 engine. The engine was built to use PC development tools and initially target the Xbox 360 system because of its similarity to the PC platform. In 2004 the project had started by just one programmer but in the following years and as they added support for more platforms more people joined in. Because of its PC development tools, video games can be programmed first on the PC, and then adjusted to run on console hardware. MT framework supports multithreading techniques to take advantage of the multicore CPUs that are being used in the Xbox 360 and PlayStation 3 consoles, as well as modern PCs.

For Lost Planet: Extreme Condition and its use of MT Framework, Capcom highlighted the following features supported by the engine: a light motion blur effect called "2.5D motion blur" (based on the "Stupid OpenGL Shader Tricks" presentation by Simon Green at the Game Developers Conference 2003) is supported to help smooth 30 fps games; Light-Space Perspective Shadow Maps, a form of shadow mapping, is used for the rendering of the shadows and a technique called Percentage Closer Filtering to smooth them; normal mapping, HDR rendering, soft particles, variable amounts of MSAA, and a technique with which particles can be rendered at 1/4th of the full resolution for the benefit of performance; basic physics handling by the integrated Havok middleware, and a custom physics engine to handle character-local physics calculations such as cloth physics and inverse kinematics.

The first significant update to the engine was the release of the PC version of Lost Planet: Extreme Condition, which was the second PC game to support DirectX 10 and the first with a DirectX 10 demo. Ambient occlusion and parallax occlusion mapping support was added to the engine, and under DirectX 10 improved soft shadow rendering, and by the use of vertex shaders, less artifact-prone motion blur, fur shading and improved depth of field with a bokeh-like appearance. The two games on PC that followed Lost Planet: Extreme Condition - Devil May Cry 4 and Resident Evil 5 - also featured DirectX 10 support, but Capcom decided against using it to improve upon the visuals, thus making them look largely the same as when running under DirectX 9. However, Resident Evil 5 under DirectX 10, was the first video game to be presented fully in stereoscopic 3D, including all of its cutscenes, and the first to be rated as "3D Vision Ready" by Nvidia. Later re-releases of the two games on PC removed DirectX 10 support.

=== MT Framework 2.x ===
A major update to the engine called MT Framework 2.0 began development in January 2008 and made its debut with the release of Lost Planet 2 in 2010. According to Capcom, several parts of the engine were re-written from scratch and as a result it performs better on the PlayStation 3 hardware, compared to the previous version of the engine which was first built with the Xbox 360 in mind. Capcom highlighted the interactivity between characters and vegetation in Lost Planet 2 as one of the significant improvements made possible with the new engine, but also noted because the game began development on the previous version of the engine it doesn't fully represent the capabilities of the new iteration. Capcom further commented that MT Framework 2.0 is able to hide the specifics of the hardware and the supported shader models from programmers, enabling them to write more platform-agnostic code than before, and reducing their burden. In Capcom's 2011 annual report, it was confirmed that 80% of MT Framework's development process is common between the Xbox 360, PlayStation 3 and PC platforms, something which reduced development costs. Lastly, Capcom made possible for the first time for external contract studios that would partner with them, to use the engine. The first externally developed game to use MT Framework 2 was Marvel vs. Capcom 3: Fate of Two Worlds.

The PC version of Lost Planet 2 released some months after the console versions in 2010, added support for DirectX 11 features such as tessellation, displacement mapping and the use of DirectCompute for soft body simulation and wave simulation. Later MT Framework 2.0 games released on PC were DirectX 9 only.

Another significant update was made for Dragon's Dogma, released in 2012. Previous MT Framework games were "stage-based" with each stage divided by a loading screen. Because Dragon's Dogma's levels are tens to hundreds times larger than in previous MT titles, and the structure of the game is open world, the only way they could make it work on the engine was by adapting it to be able to move in and out of memory portions of the game world as needed. Another improvement is that the engine moved from using a forward renderer to a hybrid one that makes use of deferred lighting (also known as Light Pre-Pass). This made it possible to support a 24-hour cycle and weather variation and an "infinite" number of lights. Other changes include support for real-time variation of a character model and FXAA. Building on top of Dragon's Dogma's updated technology, Resident Evil 6 added SSAO, and improved hair rendering (based on the "Light Scattering from Human Hair Fibers" paper presented at SIGGRAPH 2003) along with facial expressions and eye movement. Monster Hunter: World, released in 2018, can output in HDR.

=== MT Framework Lite and MT Framework Mobile ===
In late October 2009, it was reported that Capcom was bringing MT Framework to Wii to reduce the development time and costs of developing Wii games. Sengoku BASARA 3 was confirmed as the first game running on MT Framework Lite, a special version of the engine targeting the Nintendo Wii and PlayStation 3 hardware. At E3 2010, Super Street Fighter IV: 3D Edition and Resident Evil: Revelations were announced as upcoming games for the Nintendo 3DS, and in late September 2010, the two games along with Resident Evil: The Mercenaries 3D and Mega Man Legends 3 were revealed to be running on MT Framework Mobile, a new version of the engine, based on MT Framework 2.0, specifically designed for the Nintendo 3DS. Capcom noted that thanks to MT Framework Mobile, Resident Evil: Revelations features a graphics rendering pipeline that is almost identical to that of Resident Evil 5, supporting HDR rendering, self shadowing, normal mapping, color correction, gamma correction, depth of field, motion blur and anti-aliasing on the Nintendo 3DS hardware. In late January 2011, Capcom demonstrated the intro of Lost Planet 2 running on MT Framework Mobile on the "Next Generation Portable", later renamed to PlayStation Vita. The Vita version of Ultimate Marvel vs. Capcom 3 was the first MT Framework Mobile game to be released on the hardware. MT Framework Mobile's support for iOS was later also announced, and the first game to use the engine on the iPhone was the port of Phoenix Wright: Ace Attorney - Dual Destinies, released in 2014.

== Future ==
In a 2014 interview with Masaru Ijuin, an engineer behind MT Framework and the upcoming proprietary Capcom engine Panta Rhei, it was detailed that Capcom plans to move to the new engine starting with Deep Down but will continue the use of MT Framework for games developed for the seventh generation of consoles as well as MT Framework Mobile for handhelds and smartphones. He stated that "creators will have to start back at square one when they learn how [to] develop games using Panta Rhei" but the overall efficiency of development would increase more than it would if they had merely updated MT Framework. In June 2016, Resident Evil 7: Biohazard was announced and revealed to be running on a new proprietary engine by Capcom named RE Engine. RE Engine was said that it, too, will power multiple upcoming Capcom games. However Capcom chose MT Framework to build 2018's Monster Hunter: World, despite the game targeting PlayStation 4, Xbox One, and modern PCs, as they felt the existence of custom toolsets built into the engine from previous Monster Hunter titles, would benefit its development.

After the release of Monster Hunter Stories 2: Wings of Ruin in 2021, all future titles using MT Framework since then have been compilations, with the Capcom Fighting Collection series being the last of which is still running on the engine. All other compilations have since transitioned over to RE Engine.

== Games using MT Framework ==
=== Main engine (MTFW) ===
Title	First release date	Engine type	Platform(s)	Notes
Dead Rising	2006/08/08	MT Framework 1.x	Xbox 360, PlayStation 4, Xbox One and Windows	Original Xbox 360 release uses MT Framework 1.0
Lost Planet: Extreme Condition	2006/12/21	MT Framework 1.x	Xbox 360, Windows and PlayStation 3	Xbox 360 version uses MT Framework 1.1, Windows version uses MT Framework 1.2
Devil May Cry 4	2008/01/31	MT Framework 1.x	PlayStation 3, Xbox 360 and Windows	Uses MT Framework 1.3
Resident Evil 5	2009/03/05	MT Framework 1.x	PlayStation 3, Xbox 360, Windows, PlayStation 4, Xbox One and Nintendo Switch	Uses MT Framework 1.4 The PlayStation 4 and Xbox One releases of the game features some minor graphical improvements and thus might be using an updated version of the engine
Lost Planet 2	2010/05/11	MT Framework 2.x	PlayStation 3, Xbox 360 and Windows	Uses MT Framework 2.0
Marvel vs. Capcom 3: Fate of Two Worlds	2011/02/15	MT Framework 2.x	PlayStation 3 and Xbox 360	Uses MT Framework 2.1
Resident Evil Code: Veronica X HD	2011/09/27	MT Framework 2.x	PlayStation 3 and Xbox 360	The logo of MT Framework is displayed when the game is started
Ultimate Marvel vs. Capcom 3 (Home console versions)	2011/11/15	MT Framework 2.x	PlayStation 3, Xbox 360, PlayStation 4, Windows and Xbox One	The box art mentions MT Framework, unlike the PlayStation Vita version which mentions MT Framework Mobile
Dragon's Dogma	2012/05/22	MT Framework 2.x	PlayStation 3, Xbox 360, Windows, PlayStation 4, Xbox One and Nintendo Switch	
Jojo's Bizarre Adventure HD ver.	2012/08/21	MT Framework 2.x	PlayStation 3 and Xbox 360	The credits list the "MT Framework Development Team" for providing development support
Resident Evil 6	2012/10/02	MT Framework 2.x	PlayStation 3, Xbox 360, Windows, PlayStation 4, Xbox One and Nintendo Switch	
E.X. Troopers (PlayStation 3 version)	2012/11/22	MT Framework 2.x	PlayStation 3	The box art mentions MT Framework, unlike the Nintendo 3DS version which mentions MT Framework Lite
Resident Evil: Revelations (Home console versions)	2013/05/21	MT Framework 2.x	Windows, PlayStation 3, Wii U, Xbox 360, PlayStation 4, Xbox One and Nintendo Switch	The box art mentions MT Framework.
Sengoku BASARA 4	2014/01/23	MT Framework 2.x	PlayStation 3	Confirmed on box art.
Resident Evil HD Remaster	2014/11/27	MT Framework 2.x	Windows, PlayStation 3, PlayStation 4, Xbox 360, Xbox One and Nintendo Switch	Confirmed on box art
Resident Evil: Revelations 2	2015/02/24	MT Framework 2.x	Windows, PlayStation 3, PlayStation 4, Xbox 360, Xbox One and Nintendo Switch	The credits list the "MT Framework Development Team" for providing development support, unlike the PlayStation Vita version which mentions MT Framework Mobile.
Devil May Cry 4: Special Edition	2015/06/18	MT Framework 2.x	PlayStation 4, Xbox One and Windows	Confirmed on the Japanese box art.
Sengoku BASARA 4 Sumeragi	2015/07/23	MT Framework 2.x	PlayStation 3 and PlayStation 4	Confirmed on box art.
Dragon's Dogma Online	2015/08/31	MT Framework 2.x	Windows, PlayStation 3 and PlayStation 4	
Resident Evil Zero HD Remaster	2016/01/19	MT Framework 2.x	Windows, PlayStation 3, PlayStation 4, Xbox 360, Xbox One and Nintendo Switch	Confirmed on box art
Sengoku BASARA Sanada Yukimura-Den	2016/08/25	MT Framework 2.x	PlayStation 3 and PlayStation 4	Confirmed on box art.
Ultra Street Fighter II: The Final Challengers	2017/05/26	MT Framework 2.x	Nintendo Switch	
Monster Hunter Generations Ultimate	2017/08/25	MT Framework 2.x	Nintendo Switch	The box art mentions MT Framework, unlike the Nintendo 3DS version which mentions MT Framework Mobile
Monster Hunter: World	2018/01/26	MT Framework 3.0	PlayStation 4, Xbox One and Windows	
Mega Man X Legacy Collection	2018/07/24	MT Framework 2.x	Nintendo Switch, PlayStation 4, Xbox One and Windows	Confirmed on box art
Mega Man X Legacy Collection 2	2018/07/24	MT Framework 2.x	Nintendo Switch, PlayStation 4, Xbox One and Windows	Confirmed on box art
Capcom Beat 'Em Up Bundle	2018/09/18	MT Framework 2.x	Nintendo Switch, PlayStation 4, Xbox One and Windows	Confirmed on box art
Mega Man 11	2018/10/02	MT Framework 2.x	Nintendo Switch, PlayStation 4, Xbox One and Windows	
Mega Man Zero/ZX Legacy Collection	2020/02/25	MT Framework 2.x	Nintendo Switch, PlayStation 4, Xbox One and Windows	Confirmed on box art
Monster Hunter Stories 2: Wings of Ruin	2021/07/09	MT Framework 2.x	Nintendo Switch, PlayStation 4, Xbox One, and Windows	Confirmed on box art
The Great Ace Attorney Chronicles	2021/07/27	MT Framework 2.x	Nintendo Switch, PlayStation 4, and Windows	Confirmed on box art
Capcom Fighting Collection	2022/06/24	MT Framework 2.x	Nintendo Switch, PlayStation 4, Xbox One, and Windows	Confirmed on box art
Marvel vs. Capcom Fighting Collection: Arcade Classics	2024/09/12	MT Framework 2.x	Nintendo Switch, PlayStation 4, Xbox One, and Windows	Confirmed on box art
Capcom Fighting Collection 2	2025/05/16	MT Framework 2.x	Nintendo Switch, PlayStation 4, Xbox One, and Windows	Confirmed on box art

=== MT Framework Lite (MTFL) and MT Framework Mobile (MTFM) ===
Title	First release date	Engine type	Platform(s)	Source
Resident Evil: The Darkside Chronicles	2009/11/17	MT Framework Lite	Wii, PlayStation 3	
Sengoku BASARA 3 (Japan)/Sengoku BASARA Samurai Heroes (North America and Europe)	2010/07/29	MT Framework Lite	PlayStation 3, Wii	Confirmed on box art.
Super Street Fighter IV: 3D Edition	2011/02/26	MT Framework Mobile	Nintendo 3DS	
Resident Evil: The Mercenaries 3D	2011/06/02	MT Framework Mobile	Nintendo 3DS	
Nazo Waku Yakata	2011/08/04	MT Framework Mobile	Nintendo 3DS	
Sengoku BASARA 3 Utage	2011/11/10	MT Framework Lite	PlayStation 3, Wii	Confirmed on box art.
Monster Hunter 3 Ultimate	2011/12/10	MT Framework Mobile	Nintendo 3DS, Wii U	Confirmed on box art
Ultimate Marvel vs. Capcom 3 (PlayStation Vita version)	2011/12/17	MT Framework Mobile	PlayStation Vita	Confirmed on box art
Resident Evil: Revelations	2012/01/26	MT Framework Mobile	Nintendo 3DS	
E.X. Troopers (Nintendo 3DS version)	2012/11/22	MT Framework Mobile	Nintendo 3DS	Box art mentions MT Framework Lite instead of Mobile. It could be a mistake.
Phoenix Wright: Ace Attorney - Dual Destinies	2013/07/25	MT Framework Mobile	Nintendo 3DS, iOS and Android	MT Framework Mobile confirmed on box art of the Nintendo 3DS version. Furthermore, in the credits of both versions the "MT Framework Development Team" is listed, with the iOS version crediting additional staff that worked on that version.
Monster Hunter 4	2013/09/14	MT Framework Mobile	Nintendo 3DS	Confirmed on box art
Monster Hunter 4 Ultimate	2014/10/11	MT Framework Mobile	Nintendo 3DS	Confirmed on box art
The Great Ace Attorney: Adventures	2015/07/09	MT Framework Mobile	Nintendo 3DS, Android and iOS	Confirmed on box art
Resident Evil: Revelations 2	2015/08/18	MT Framework Mobile	PlayStation Vita	The game shows the MT Framework Mobile logo when it starts.
Monster Hunter Generations	2015/11/28	MT Framework Mobile	Nintendo 3DS	Confirmed on box art
Phoenix Wright: Ace Attorney − Spirit of Justice	2016/06/09	MT Framework Mobile	Nintendo 3DS, Android and iOS	Confirmed on box art
Monster Hunter Stories	2016/10/08	MT Framework Mobile	Nintendo 3DS, Android and iOS	Confirmed on box art
Monster Hunter XX	2017/03/18	MT Framework Mobile	Nintendo 3DS	Confirmed on box art
The Great Ace Attorney 2: Resolve	2017/08/03	MT Framework Mobile	Nintendo 3DS, Android and iOS	Confirmed on box art
Gundam Breaker Mobile	2019/07/30	MT Framework Mobile	Android and iOS	Confirmed via credits
