= Kunitsu-Gami: Path of the Goddess =

2024 video game

- Developer: Capcom
- Publisher: Capcom
- Director: Shuichi Kawata
- Producers: Yoshiaki Hirabayashi; Masato Kumazawa
- Designer: Maito Yamada
- Programmer: Kenichi Saito
- Artist: Shuichi Kawata
- Writer: Tairoku Nozoe
- Composer: Chikara Aoshima
- Engine: RE Engine
- Platforms: PlayStation 4; PlayStation 5; Windows; Xbox One; Xbox Series X/S; Nintendo Switch 2
- Release: July 19, 2024; Switch 2 June 5, 2025
- Genres: Action, strategy
- Mode: Single-player

Kunitsu-Gami: Path of the Goddess is a 2024 action-strategy video game developed and published by Capcom. The player assumes control of Soh, a warrior who is tasked to protect a divine maiden named Yoshiro who must purge and cleanse villages of defilement and return the legendary Mt. Kafuku to peace.

The game was released for PlayStation 4, PlayStation 5, Windows, Xbox One, and Xbox Series X/S on July 19, 2024 and on the Nintendo Switch 2 on June 5, 2025 as a launch title for the console. Upon release, the game received generally positive reviews from critics, but failed to meet Capcom's sales expectations.

== Gameplay ==
Kunitsu-Gami: Path of the Goddess is an action-strategy game played from a third-person perspective, and features elements from real-time strategy and tower defense games. Gameplay is divided into two different parts. Daytime is the preparatory phase in which Soh must explore the village and rescue villagers, as well as setting up various contraptions. At night, evil spirits named the "Seethe" will invade the village from Torii gates, and the player must ally with the rescued villagers to defend Yoshiro from hostile attacks until sunrise. Players can strategically place villagers in tactical positions, and assign them with different roles. For instance, a woodcutter is a powerful melee attacker, while an archer can provide ranged support. Players can also further equip Soh and the villagers with one of twelve masks that also grant them divine powers. The position and the roles of the villagers can also be changed during combat. If Soh becomes severely injured in the game, they will enter "Spirit mode", allowing them to continue issuing commands to other villagers while disembodied.

== Development and release ==
Kunitsu-Gami: Path of the Goddess was developed by Capcom Development Division 1, the studio behind games such as Resident Evil and Devil May Cry. Shuichi Kawata, who previously worked on Shinsekai: Into the Depths, is the game's lead director. Development of the game lasted for more than four years. Like Shinsekai and Ōkami, the game was heavily inspired by Japanese folklores. Soh's combat was inspired by an ancient ceremonial form of dance named kagura, while enemy design was influenced by Japanese yokai. The game is powered by Capcom's in-house RE Engine.

Kunitsu-Gami: Path of the Goddess was officially revealed by Capcom in June 2023. The game was released for PlayStation 4, PlayStation 5, Windows, Xbox One, and Xbox Series X/S on July 19, 2024, and was made available at no additional cost for Xbox Game Pass subscribers at launch. Players who pre-ordered the game received additional in-game items and an artbook.

Capcom worked with Ningyo-Joruri Bunraku Theater supervising director Master Kanjuro Kiritake III to direct a bunraku prequel to the game. It was released via YouTube on July 18, 2024 titled Ceremony of the Deity: The Maiden’s Destiny. According to Tairoku Nozoe, who wrote the script, it was the idea of Shuichi Kawata, game director, to have a prequel based on a bunraku due to Kawata being a fan. Master Kanjuro agreed to help Kawata plan the bunraku despite his hesitation due to not having a concept idea in mind.

In July 2024, the Capcom Next Summer livestream video on YouTube announced that a demo for the game was released with a collaboration alongside Ōkami until July 17, using costumes, weapons and music from the game.

== Reception ==
Reception

Aggregate scores
Aggregator	Score
Metacritic	80/100 (PS5); 84/100 (PC); 84/100 (XSXS)
OpenCritic	90% recommend

Review scores
Publication	Score
Digital Trends	4.5/5
Eurogamer	5/5
Famitsu	34/40
Game Informer	8.75
HobbyConsolas	88/100
IGN	8/10
PC Gamer (US)	86/100
Push Square	7/10
Shacknews	9/10

=== Critical reception ===
Kunitsu-Gami: Path of the Goddess received "generally favorable" reviews from critics, according to review aggregator website Metacritic. In Japan, four critics from Famitsu gave the game a total score of 34 out of 40.

=== Sales ===
In November 2024, Capcom said that Kunitsu-Gami: Path of the Goddess had failed to meet sales expectations.

=== Awards ===
Year	Ceremony	Category	Result	Ref.
2024	The Game Awards 2024	Best Sim/Strategy Game	Nominated	
2025	New York Game Awards	Statue of Liberty Award for Best World	Nominated	
2025	New York Game Awards	Tin Pan Alley Award for Best Music in a Game	Nominated	
