= RE Engine =

Video game engine

- Logo since 2020
- Developer: Capcom
- Release: 2014
- Platform: Android; iOS; macOS; Nintendo Switch; Nintendo Switch 2; PlayStation 4; PlayStation 5; Stadia; Windows; Xbox One; Xbox Series X/S
- License: Proprietary

RE Engine, also known as Reach for the Moon Engine, is a proprietary video game engine created by Capcom. It was designed as a successor to MT Framework in the mid-2010s during the development of Resident Evil 7: Biohazard. The engine would subsequently be used to develop its sequels Resident Evil Village and Requiem, in addition to the remakes of Resident Evil 2, Resident Evil 3, Resident Evil 4 and the upcoming Resident Evil Veronica. It has also been used in Capcom's Devil May Cry 5, Monster Hunter Rise, Street Fighter 6, Dragon's Dogma 2, Monster Hunter Wilds, and Pragmata.

== History ==
Capcom originally intended to follow up MT Framework with the engine Panta Rhei, with development starting in 2011; it was abandoned due to development hell of the unreleased PlayStation 4 game Deep Down, for which it was to serve as a showcase.

RE Engine was created in 2014, during the beginning of the development of Resident Evil 7. The engine was originally designed with the game's linear nature in mind and was created to make game development more efficient. The reason the team did not choose a third-party engine was that "a highly generic engine developed by another company would not be appropriate" for a game like Resident Evil 7. MT Framework was not used for the project due to its slower development tools. Jun Takeuchi, the head of Capcom's Division 1 stated "we had to rethink the way we make games. In order to carry out asset-based (graphic and 3D model elements) development, which is globally the mainstream, we began developing our new RE Engine".

Since its introduction, RE Engine has been used as the primary game engine across all Capcom titles. No single game or franchise drives the direction of the engine, according to Monster Hunter producer Ryozo Tsujimoto, and instead all studios contribute towards its improvement. This approach has avoided the pitfalls that other developers have had dealing with the demand to use a singular engine tuned for a specific game to be used across all games, such as at Electronic Arts.

When discussing Monster Hunter Rise, Yasunori Ichinose, the game's director, discussed porting RE Engine to the Nintendo Switch, and said "a lot of background technical engineering work need[ed] to be done just to achieve targeting a new hardware platform", and mentioned the challenge of creating the large maps the team wanted while trying to maintain the game's graphical quality. Capcom personally requested that Nintendo would increase the Switch's on-board RAM from the previously planned 2GB to the finalized 4GB capacity, so it would be potent for developing games on the platform using RE Engine such as Rise.

In October 2023, Capcom unveiled "Codename REX" (RE neXt ENGINE), their next-generation game engine, during a 22-minute developer-focused presentation. Acknowledging limitations in the current RE Engine, the new engine upgrade will involve incrementally integrating RE+X technology into the existing RE Engine, elevating it to next-generation capabilities. At an October 2026 presentation, Capcom programmer Satoshi Ishida said they were working to incorporate AI into the workflow process of REX, as they had found "successfully integrating AI technology into development workflows has become an essential condition for streamlining future development". Capcom previously stated that they will only use AI for such development workflow, and will not use AI-generated assets within games.

== Features ==
RE Engine features various improvements over MT Framework, including new anti-aliasing and volumetric lighting features. The engine also allows developers to use photogrammetry to create higher quality assets. It also includes improved VR support over its predecessor, allowing it to hit high framerates necessary to avoid motion sickness. It also includes tools to make animation faster, such as modular rigging, motion matching, procedural animation and motion retargeting. RE Engine also has various new physics simulation options which allow for more realistic debris.

The RE Engine uses C# for game logic and scripting, which runs on a proprietary process virtual machine (PVM) developed by Capcom known as REVM.

== Games ==
Games developed using RE Engine
Year	Title	Ref.	Platform(s)
2017	Resident Evil 7: Biohazard		PlayStation 4, Windows, Xbox One, PlayStation 5, Xbox Series X/S, iOS (Note: Compatible exclusively with devices using the Apple A17 Pro or newer), iPadOS, macOS, Nintendo Switch 2
2019	Resident Evil 2		PlayStation 4, Windows, Xbox One, PlayStation 5, Xbox Series X/S, iOS, iPadOS, macOS, Nintendo Switch 2
2019	Devil May Cry 5		PlayStation 4, Windows, Xbox One, PlayStation 5, Xbox Series X/S, Nintendo Switch 2
2020	Resident Evil 3		PlayStation 4, Windows, Xbox One, PlayStation 5, Xbox Series X/S, iOS iPadOS, macOS, Nintendo Switch 2
2020	Resident Evil: Resistance		PlayStation 4, Windows, Xbox One
2021	Capcom Arcade Stadium		Nintendo Switch, PlayStation 4, Windows, Xbox One
2021	Ghosts 'n Goblins Resurrection		Nintendo Switch, PlayStation 4, Windows, Xbox One
2021	Monster Hunter Rise		Nintendo Switch, Windows, PlayStation 4, PlayStation 5, Windows, Xbox One, Xbox Series X/S
2021	Resident Evil Village		PlayStation 4, PlayStation 5, Stadia, Windows, Xbox One, Xbox Series X/S, macOS, iOS, iPadOS, Nintendo Switch 2
2022	Capcom Arcade 2nd Stadium		Nintendo Switch, PlayStation 4, Windows, Xbox One
2022	Resident Evil Re:Verse		PlayStation 4, Windows, Xbox One
2023	Resident Evil 4		PlayStation 4, PlayStation 5, Windows, Xbox Series X/S, iOS, iPadOS, macOS, Nintendo Switch 2
2023	Street Fighter 6		PlayStation 4, PlayStation 5, Windows, Xbox Series X/S, arcade (Note: Taito Type X4 arcade system), Nintendo Switch 2
2023	Ghost Trick: Phantom Detective		Nintendo Switch, PlayStation 4, Windows, Xbox One, Android, iOS
2023	Exoprimal		PlayStation 4, PlayStation 5, Windows, Xbox One, Xbox Series X/S
2024	Apollo Justice: Ace Attorney Trilogy		Nintendo Switch, PlayStation 4, Windows, Xbox One
2024	Dragon's Dogma 2		PlayStation 5, Windows, Xbox Series X/S, Nintendo Switch 2
2024	Kunitsu-Gami: Path of the Goddess		PlayStation 4, PlayStation 5, Windows, Xbox One, Xbox Series X/S, Nintendo Switch 2
2024	Dead Rising Deluxe Remaster		PlayStation 5, Windows, Xbox Series X/S
2025	Monster Hunter Wilds		PlayStation 5, Windows, Xbox Series X/S, Nintendo Switch 2
2025	Onimusha 2: Samurai's Destiny		Nintendo Switch, PlayStation 4, Windows, Xbox One
2026	Resident Evil Requiem		Nintendo Switch 2, PlayStation 5, Windows, Xbox Series X/S
2026	Monster Hunter Stories 3: Twisted Reflection		Nintendo Switch 2, PlayStation 5, Windows, Xbox Series X/S
2026	Mega Man Star Force Legacy Collection		Nintendo Switch, PlayStation 4, PlayStation 5, Windows, Xbox One, Xbox Series X/S
2026	Pragmata		Nintendo Switch 2, PlayStation 5, Windows, Xbox Series X/S
2026	Onimusha: Way of the Sword		Nintendo Switch 2, PlayStation 5, Windows, Xbox Series X/S
2027	Resident Evil Veronica		Nintendo Switch 2, PlayStation 5, Windows, Xbox Series X/S
2027	Mega Man: Dual Override		Nintendo Switch, Nintendo Switch 2, PlayStation 4, PlayStation 5, Windows, Xbox One, Xbox Series X/S
TBA	Okami sequel		TBA
