= Monster Hunter Generations =

2015 video game

- Developer: Capcom
- Publisher: Capcom
- Directors: Yasunori Ichinose; Daisuke Ichihara (Ultimate)
- Producers: Shintaro Kojima; Akihito Kadowaki (Ultimate)
- Composer: Reo Uratani
- Series: Monster Hunter
- Engine: MT Framework
- Platforms: Nintendo 3DS; Nintendo Switch
- Release: Generations / X: JP: November 28, 2015; EU: July 15, 2016; NA: July 15, 2016; AU: July 16, 2016; XX: JP: March 18, 2017; Generations Ultimate / XX - Nintendo Switch Ver.: JP: August 25, 2017; WW: August 28, 2018
- Genre: Action role-playing
- Modes: Single-player, multiplayer

Monster Hunter Generations (Note: Monster Hunter X (モンスターハンタークロス, Monsutā Hantā Kurosu) in Japan) is an action role-playing game developed and published by Capcom for the Nintendo 3DS. Announced in May 2015, the game was released in Japan as Monster Hunter X in November 2015 and internationally in July 2016. Like other titles in the Monster Hunter series, players undertake quests that involve hunting large dangerous creatures, either solo or in multiplayer. Major additions in this installment include special attacks, new combat styles, and the ability to play as Felynes who have traditionally only appeared as a companion to the player. Monster Hunter Generations is considered the fourth major portable title in the series, following Monster Hunter Portable 3rd. An expanded version of the game, titled Monster Hunter XX, was announced in October 2016, and was released exclusively in Japan in March 2017. An HD port of the expanded re-release for the Nintendo Switch, titled Monster Hunter Generations Ultimate, (Note: Monster Hunter XX - Nintendo Switch Ver. in Japanese) was released in Japan in August 2017 followed by a worldwide release in August 2018. The game has sold more than 8 million units worldwide, as of September 2020.

== Gameplay ==
Monster Hunter Generations features gameplay similar to past titles in the series. The player assumes the role of a hunter who embarks on quests to hunt dangerous creatures. A hunter's abilities are determined by the type of armor and weapons that they wear on a quest, as the hunter otherwise has no intrinsic attributes that affect gameplay. All fourteen weapon types from Monster Hunter 4 Ultimate, ranging from swords, hammers, bows, guns, and lances, are included in Monster Hunter Generations, in addition to the new Prowler mode which allows the player to take the role of a Felyne, a sentient cat-like species. Each weapon has different sets of moves and abilities that can be employed while in the field. Armors grant defensive bonuses to physical and elemental damage and can boost specific skills and attack types through base attributes and the addition of special decoration gems and talismans. To make a more powerful hunter that can survive against more dangerous creatures, the player takes materials carved from monsters (either slain or captured via traps), as well as materials gathered from the various fields and purchased in village stores, to craft new armor or to craft and upgrade weapons. Defeating more powerful creatures enables even more potent equipment to be crafted, thus creating a gameplay progress through the game's loot system. New in Generations is the ability to transform armor pieces into new gear similar to weapon upgrade paths by upgrading it with materials from broad categories, like bones or ores, and having the ability to upgrade a weapon directly to a more advanced version without the intermediate upgrade steps.

Monster Hunter Generations features new special moves known as Hunting Arts. These moves require the player to wait for the moves to charge up during the course of a hunt before they can be activated. Once ready, the player can activate them at any time, after which they have to wait for them to charge up again before a second use. The Arts have different effects such as dealing massive damage, providing buffs, or healing allies. The game also introduces a system called "Hunting Styles". This system adds different attack styles for a weapon. Each weapon type in the game will have four distinct forms. The Guild Style is a balanced and basic style akin to combat in previous games of the series. The Striker Style is less technical but emphasises the use of Hunting Arts letting the player set up three special attacks. The Aerial Style specialises in mid-air attacks allowing players to use monsters as a platform which they can propel themselves off. The Adept Style gives players an opportunity to perform powerful counterattacks after successfully evading a monster's attack. Visually, the game's combat has been described as flashier than previous titles.

The game will have four new signature monsters along with a number of past flagship monsters. Included are what are known as Deviant Monsters, previous monsters from other games in the series that have been said to have mutated and evolved into more powerful forms, which on defeat will yield spoils of combat that can be used to craft high-level equipment. The game features four villages which are non-combat areas for getting quests and communicating with non-player characters. Three villages return from previous titles, and a new village called Bherna has been added. The game includes an improved resource gathering system; resource points on the various areas will have more items that can be acquired before they are exhausted and the player only has to hold down a controller button to continue to collect items instead of pressing the button each time, and once per mission, the player can call a Felyne messenger to take one inventory's worth of goods back to a village to store.

== Development ==
Planning for Monster Hunter Generations began during the development of Monster Hunter 4 Ultimate. The game's Japanese title—Monster Hunter X, pronounced as Monster Hunter Cross—originated from the idea of crossing old and new elements of the series in the game. Series executive producer Ryozo Tsujimoto saw that since it had been more than ten years since the beginning of the franchise, they wanted to celebrate the occasion, putting the idea of the game as "a festival feeling, a special event". Game producer, Shintaro Kojima, noted that "the letter X looks like it divides the given space into four… so four hunting styles, four large main monsters, four villages. They’re all crossing." The four flagship monsters featured in this title are Astalos, Gammoth, Mizutsune, and Glavenus.

Originally, Capcom considered adding a new weapon type for Monster Hunter Generations. This would have required a lot of development work, so instead they opted to focus on the concept of a player's "attachment to the weapon". The developers noted how players would develop their own approach to combat, which inspired the idea of the hunting skills and arts as these would further give each player to craft a hunter to their unique play style. However, they still needed to balance the strength and effectiveness of these new arts and skills so that Generations would remain fundamentally a game that required the player to read a monster's actions and make the right moves at the right time, and would keep the animation mechanics found in the main series games. Several features—underwater combat, guild quests, and frenzied monsters—from past titles are omitted in Monster Hunter Generations. Tsujimoto said that this was to emphasize the unique elements of the new title.

As with Monster Hunter 4, Generations includes a number of quests that help to orient a player to the various gameplay systems within the game; this includes special quest lines for each weapon type to help accustom the player to that weapon and its strategies. The Prowler-Felyne hunter choice was aimed specifically for new players of the series, but also to give veteran players a new way to experience the title. With the Prowler mode, it helps to emphasise the need to watch the monsters and read their tell before making a move and gaining the opportunity for a counterattack.

While the period between the Japanese release of Monster Hunter 4 and Generations was nearly annual, the producers state they have no expectations to make Monster Hunter an annual series. They found the response from Western audiences with these two games overwhelming, and are working to make the localization process easier to reduce the time between the Japanese and Western releases, and would like to eventually see a simultaneous release in these regions in the future.

== Release ==
Monster Hunter Generations was first announced in Japan under the title Monster Hunter X in May 2015 with a planned release later that year, during a Nintendo Direct presentation. A demo of the game was released digitally in Japan on November 19, 2015, via the Nintendo eShop. The demo features three quests involving different monsters. The game was subsequently released for Nintendo 3DS in Japan on November 28, 2015. Alongside the game's Japanese launch, Nintendo released Monster Hunter X-themed faceplates for the New Nintendo 3DS, and a limited-edition Monster Hunter X-themed New Nintendo 3DS XL featuring the game's logo and four signature monsters.

For North America and Europe, the game was released as Monster Hunter Generations on July 15, 2016, along with a limited-edition New Nintendo 3DS XL similar to the Japanese release. The demo version was made available in Europe on June 15, 2016, and in North America on June 30, 2016. Players that transfer their Monster Hunter 4 Ultimate saves into Monster Hunter Generations receive an in-game armor set for their Palico.

Similar to previous Monster Hunter games, the player can obtain armor sets, weapons and clothing themed to other Capcom games and other third-party titles. Generations includes such themes based on Amaterasu from Ōkami, Chun-Li and Blanka from Street Fighter, Arthur from Ghosts 'n Goblins, Strider Hiryu from Strider, Link from The Legend of Zelda: The Wind Waker, and Fox McCloud from the Star Fox series. Such costumes are obtained by completing quests that are offered as free downloadable content.

An expanded version of the game, Monster Hunter XX, was announced in October 2016. It was released in Japan on March 18, 2017. More downloadable content based on other games was made available for this version shortly after release. Newly represented games include The Legend of Zelda: Breath of the Wild and the Ace Attorney series, as well as more content based on Ōkami and Strider. Japanese singer Daigo was also represented in the game. The expansion also featured a collaboration with Sailor Moon as part of the 25th anniversary celebration of the franchise. The Felyne cat companion resembles Luna and wields Sailor Moon's Cutie Moon Rod weapon.

On May 26, 2017, it was announced that the game would be ported to the Nintendo Switch under the Japanese title of Monster Hunter XX: Nintendo Switch Ver., and it was released on August 25, 2017. Save data from Monster Hunter X is able to be transferred to this version of the game, while progress can also be swapped between the 3DS and Switch versions of XX. Like Monster Hunter 3 Ultimate before it, XX features cross-platform multiplayer. Capcom stated during the June Electronic Entertainment Expo 2017 event that at the time it had no plans to localize the Switch version of Monster Hunter XX for Western audiences, though they did announce Monster Hunter: World to come to personal computers and other consoles. This later changed, as the title was released for Western markets as Monster Hunter Generations Ultimate on August 28, 2018. Ultimate allows players to transfer saved games from the 3DS Generations games.

== Reception ==
Reception

Aggregate score
Aggregator	Score
Metacritic	3DS: 85/100; NS: 80/100

Review scores
Publication	Score
Game Informer	8.75/10
GameSpot	8/10
IGN	8.0/10
Polygon	8.5/10
USgamer	4.5/5

Following the 2015 Tokyo Game Show, the Computer Entertainment Supplier's Association named Monster Hunter Generations as one of ten winners for the "Future Division" Award.

Prior to the game's launch, Capcom expected to sell 2.5 million copies of Monster Hunter Generations by March 2016. The game sold over 1.5 million units in its first two days, and as of December 24, 2015, the game has sold over 3 million copies. Japanese sales tracker, Media Create reported that Monster Hunter Generations sold through over 91% of its retail stock in its first week. Total software sales in Japan during the week of the game's launch were the highest recorded so far in 2015, with Monster Hunter Generations contributing over 75% of sales. The launch also led to a rise in total hardware sales, with sales of the New Nintendo 3DS XL increasing by over 360% from the previous week.

According to the NPD Group, Monster Hunter Generations was the best selling game in July 2016 in North America, and, alongside renewed interest in Pokémon games resulting from Pokémon Go, helped to boost 3DS sales over all other consoles and 80% better than 3DS sales the previous year.

Capcom reported that Monster Hunter Generations had exceeded 4.1 million units sold worldwide by September 2016, with sales in Western countries described as "solid". As of September 2017, Monster Hunter X/Generations has sold 4.3 million units for the 3DS.

Monster Hunter XX sold 1.7 million copies by April 2017. As of September 2017, Monster Hunter XX has sold 1.8 million units for the 3DS. The Switch version sold 84,377 copies in its first week in Japan, debuting at number 1 in the charts, selling 48.9% of its initial shipment. As of November 6, 2017, shipments of the Switch version exceeded 350,000 units in Japan.

As of December 2018, the total sales for Monster Hunter XX reached 3 million units worldwide. As of September 2020, Generations had sold 4.3 million units for the 3DS while Generations Ultimate has sold 3.9 million units for the Switch and 3DS, for a total of 8.2 million units sold across all versions.

== Accolades ==
Year	Award	Category	Result	Ref
2016	The Game Awards 2016	Best Handheld/Mobile Game	Nominated	
