= Carol Christian Poell =

Austrian fashion designer (born 1966)

- Born: 1966 (age 59–60); Linz, Austria
- Education: Domus Academy (MA)
- Occupation: Fashion designer
- Website: www.carolchristianpoell.com

Carol Christian Poell (Note: Pronounced "pole") (born 1966) is an Austrian fashion designer and head of the label CCP. He is known for his avant-garde designs.

== Biography ==
Poell was born in Linz, Austria in 1966 to a family of leather tanners. By the age of 15, he was working in his parents' clothing factory. He trained as a master tailor in Linz before studying at the Senior Academy of Commerce and the School of Fashion and Design in Graz, the Costume Michel Beuern School for Tailoring and Dressmaking in Vienna, and finally the Domus Academy in Milan, where he met his business partner Sergio Simone in 1994 or 1995, with whom he founded his brand CCP. He graduated from Domus with a master's in fashion design in 1995.

Poell released his first collection for the Fall/Winter 1994-95 season, and his first full collection in Spring/Summer 1995-96. His first womenswear collection was released Spring/Summer 1999; it was originally intended for men, but Poell thought the set did not conform to the theme of his previous lines. Other collection launches include SS01, in which models were presented on stretchers, and SS04, where they were locked in a dog kennel.

One of Poell’s best-known presentations is Mainstream Downstream, held in Milan in June 2003 for the Spring/Summer 2004 collection. The models were led to float down the Naviglio Grande, taking the appearance of corpses. W Magazine said it "should be remembered as an aesthetically inspiring event." Fashion director Jonny Johansson said it was his favorite fashion show. Fashion journalist Eugene Rabkin said the show marked "the end of a golden age of fashion."

== Style ==
Poell is known for his creation and use of fabrics; he develops 90% of the fabrics he uses in collaboration with Japanese and Italian weavers under strict constraints. He has used materials such as human hair, fiberglass, titanium, and aluminum. He has done multiple experiments with leather, making it transparent, using blood to stain its interior, and using leather from creatures like kangaroos, calves, horses, bison, deer, and donkeys. He has repeatedly used a "rubber drip” technique to produce stalactite-like spikes on the soles of shoes (and other articles), described by GQ as "his most coveted design". He also has inserted titanium in the joints of jackets and gloves.

Poell is also known for his meticulous tailoring and tight-fitting cuts. Some of his work features intentionally obvious seams, stitches, or scars. He frequently invokes elements of anatomy, like with injection-dyed veins showing through opaque leather and a bag made from a full taxidermied piglet. He has also claimed that he wants to create a piece from human skin.

According to Ulrich Lehmann, a fashion theorist and friend of Poell, "with Carol, [fashion]’s not removed from the body – it’s part of it". Poell said that "there is not a single type of woman or man that I refer to: I am interested in the body as a volume." Curator Jana Scholze said Poell "challenge[s] and celebrate[s] fundamental aspects of garments as items to cover and protect the body."

Poell has been called a niche or cult designer. His design has been called dystopian and semi-gothic, as well as "anti-fashion". Esquire named Poell as one of the designers "reshaping men's wear" in 1996. In 1998, magazine editor Carla Sozzani said he was "young, talented, and full of integrity." His work inspired the character designers of Devil May Cry 5.
