= Deep Down (video game) =

Unreleased video game

- Developer: Capcom Online Games
- Publisher: Capcom
- Producers: Kazunori Sugiura; Yoshinori Ono
- Engine: Panta Rhei
- Platform: PlayStation 4
- Release: Cancelled
- Genre: Action role-playing
- Modes: Single-player, multiplayer

Deep Down (working title) is an unreleased action role-playing game developed and published by Capcom. It was announced for the PlayStation 4 in 2013, but entered development hell and, despite being near completion, was not released. It is regarded as vaporware, although not officially cancelled. A science fantasy game with cooperative multiplayer elements, it takes place in far-future New York City, and players are teleported back in time by touching magical artifacts.

== Gameplay ==
The player (foreground) battles a draconic monster.

Deep Down is a single-player or (up to four player) co-op multiplayer dungeon crawl. Gameplay has been described as similar to Capcom's own Dragon's Dogma. The historical sections of the game take place in a medieval/fantasy setting in procedurally generated dungeons, with the player equipped with suits of armor, swords, pikes, shields etc. Creatures encountered are from the fantasy trope, including ogres, shapeshifters similar to mimics (D&D), and dragons.

== Plot ==
The player perspective for Deep Down begins in New York City in the year 2094. The story focuses on a member of a group known as the "Ravens" who has the ability to recover historical memories by touching ancient objects. This 'Raven' is brought into contact with excavated objects from a mysterious civilization in Bohemia (Czech Republic) dating from the 15th century and are asked to use their abilities to explore the city and discover its secrets.

== Development ==
At the PlayStation Meeting on February 20, 2013 where Sony debuted the PlayStation 4, Capcom's Yoshinori Ono, best known for his work on the Street Fighter series, revealed Deep Down alongside their new "Panta Rhei" game engine, designed specifically for the PlayStation 4. Deep Down was the working title, and Panta Rhei was announced to replace MT Framework as Capcom's game engine of choice. The reveal trailer showed an armored warrior battling a medieval fire-breathing dragon. They chose to make a new brand for freedom to explore next-gen video game console architecture, and so as to avoid limitations from consumer expectations. The game did not have a presence at the E3 2013.

During Tokyo Game Show 2013, Capcom producer Yoshinori Ono announced that Deep Down was to be a free-to-play title; the initial expected release date was to be in 2014 after a public beta coincided with the Japanese release of the PS4. In early 2015, Kazunori Sugiura stated in an interview with 4gamer that the vision for the game had expanded since its initial 2013 reveal, to better appeal in the long term to players, and so the development timescale had been extended.

Capcom extended the trademark for the game in June 2018 but let it lapse in 2020.

During an interview with Eurogamer in November 2019 (primarily focused on Street Fighter V), Ono responded to a mention of Deep Down, saying that despite its long absence, the game "[has] not been completely given up on".

With Ono's departure from Capcom in 2020, the release status of Deep Down is publicly unknown. In September 2021, former chairman of SIE Worldwide Studios Shawn Layden stated that he had "no idea" what happened to Deep Down but says that other team members of Yoshinori Ono might pick up the game further to develop.
