= Computer Entertainment Supplier's Association =

Japanese organization

- Founded: 1996; 30 years ago
- Headquarters: Tokyo, Japan
- Area served: Worldwide
- Website: cedec.cesa.or.jp

Computer Entertainment Supplier's Association (Japanese: 一般社団法人コンピュータエンターテインメント協会, Hepburn: Ippan Shadan Hōjin Konpyu-ta Enta-teinmento Kyōkai) (CESA (セサ, Sesa)) is a Japanese organization that was established in 1996 to "promote the computer entertainment industry [...] with the aim of contributing to the strengthening of Japanese industry as well as to the further enrichment of people's lifestyles." It organizes the annual Tokyo Game Show, Japan Game Awards and Computer Entertainment Developers Conference (CEDEC).

CESA is located in Tokyo, Japan. The current (As of 2023) chairman of CESA is Haruhiro Tsujimoto, the president of Capcom. The Managing Director is Tsutomu Masuda.

The Computer Entertainment Rating Organization (CERO), a rating agency, was established in June of 2002 as a branch of CESA, and officially became a nonprofit organization under Japanese law in December of 2003.

== See also ==
- CEDEC Awards
- Supplier association
