= E.X. Troopers =

2012 video game

- Cover art for the 3DS version
- Developers: Capcom; HexaDrive (PlayStation 3 version)
- Publisher: Capcom
- Director: Yasuhiro Anpo
- Producer: Shintaro Kojima
- Artists: Takahiro Kawano; Chisato Mita
- Writer: Dai Satō (Storyriders)
- Composers: Yasumasa Kitagawa; May'n (theme)
- Series: Lost Planet
- Engine: MT Framework
- Platforms: Nintendo 3DS; PlayStation 3
- Release: Retail: JP: November 22, 2012; Digital distribution: JP: January 24, 2013
- Genres: Action; Third-person shooter
- Modes: Single-player; Multiplayer

E.X. Troopers (Japanese: エクストルーパーズ, Hepburn: Ekusutorūpāzu), stylized as E.X. Tr∞pers, is a third-person shooter video game developed and published by Capcom for Nintendo 3DS and PlayStation 3. It is a spin-off of the Lost Planet series. The game was released in Japan to retail customers on November 22, 2012 and later on Nintendo eShop and PlayStation Network on January 24, 2013.

== Gameplay ==
The game features similar gameplay elements to previous Lost Planet games, including the presence of major boss battles, extreme terrain, and Vital Suits (VSs). The player controls the protagonist, Bren, from a third-person perspective as he is challenged to navigate through different areas by running, dashing, grappling, zip-lining, and using his jet pack to quickly boost over a short distance.

Combat primarily focuses on shooting enemies using a primary and secondary weapon (typically a weaker and short-ranged firearm with more ammo and a stronger and more versatile weapon, respectively). The game also features melee combat, involving punching foes into the air to juggle them with firearms (much like Devil May Cry), kicking them away, and blocking their attacks. The jet pack can be incorporated into attacks to increase their strength and effectiveness. Experience is earned by eliminating enemies and completing objectives. As they gain levels from experience growth, player characters gain improvements like increased health points, stronger melee attacks, better defenses, and prolonged jet pack boosts. Occasionally, there are missions involving VS piloting, which enables limited flight as well as the ability to perform stronger ranged and melee attacks.

Thermal energy (T-ENG) is now used for charging up special attacks and restoring the life bar, rather than for survival (represented numerically by the player's HUD in Lost Planet: Extreme Condition and Lost Planet 2) or as currency (used in Lost Planet 3). Players can tap into their T-ENG reserve to release numerous forms of an exothermic (EX-T) blast to deal large amounts of damage to enemies.

Armour and weapon upgrades are created from gathering materials (sometimes from enemy remains, similar to Monster Hunter) and require paying vendors with points, which are rewarded after successful missions. Points can also be used to purchase food items that provide various short-term buffs. Mission-based mechanics allow players to take on core quests that progress the story-driven adventure, or sidequests from other characters during the campaign.

The game also rewards players with medals, which require progressing through the main campaign, completing secondary objectives in VR training missions, or playing in a unique manner. Once the game has been beaten, additional VR missions are unlocked and the main campaign can also be replayed with the inclusion of secondary objectives, which may be attempted for more medals. Medals can be spent to obtain music tracks and costumes for the player to customize their avatar.

=== Multiplayer ===
Both the Nintendo 3DS and PlayStation 3 versions of the game have multiplayer support. The former only supports local play through wireless communication while the latter only supports online play through PlayStation Network. This allows players to play through the VR missions cooperatively in a group of up to three people. There is also a versus mode featuring team deathmatch and capture the beacon for up to six people split into two teams.

== Plot ==
The game begins with the approach of spacecraft transporting enlistees to Neo Venus Construction Inc. (NEVEC) Academy's educational institutions on the planet E.D.N. III. Bren Turner, a candidate from E.D.N. II, is on board among the new recruits when the fleet is suddenly attacked by mysterious VSs. To confront the hostile force, Instructor Walter Stingray selects Bren to pilot a prototype VS equipped with a next-generation AI, capable of even autonomous behaviour. As the new "master" of this state-of-the-art machine, Bren designates it with the name "Gingira" and joins Walter to defend the fleet.

After a fierce and intense fight, Bren and Walter successfully destroy the attackers, but are forced to eject from Gingira during atmospheric entry to the surface of E.D.N. III - a planet with an unforgiving environment and the alien race known as Akrid (AK).

== Development ==
While E.X. Troopers had a trademark that was filed in November 2011, it was originally teased in an issue of Famitsu as a new Capcom project with limited information and without a title in April 2012, the same month as Lost Planet 3's announcement.

The mysterious game was officially announced in another issue of Famitsu during May 2012, and revealed to be an action shooter for the Nintendo 3DS and PlayStation 3 headed by Shintaro Kojima (Monster Hunter producer). The game shares the same world as Lost Planet, but features an anime art style (using a cel-shaded design aesthetic) and a school-themed atmosphere akin to a science fiction version of Capcom's Rival Schools: United by Fate or Project Justice. There is also manga-style storytelling used between stages, similar to the cutscenes in Gravity Rush. Famitsu also reported that E.X. Troopers would see a return of snow pirates, VSs and the Akrid aliens, and introduced the bases on E.D.N. III as well as Bren and TeeKee as new characters.

At the time of announcement, E.X. Troopers was estimated to be approximately 60% complete and would be released later in the same year. The game's playable debut appearance occurred soon after at Capcom's Summer Jam exhibition event held at Tokyo Big Sight on June 30 and July 1, 2012. Capcom also announced on September 20 that Dai Satō (Cowboy Bebop, Ghost in the Shell: Stand Alone Complex, Eureka Seven) was in charge of writing the script for the game during a presentation at Tokyo Game Show 2012 (TGS 2012).

A free demo for the game, announced at TGS 2012, arrived on the Japanese 3DS eShop on October 17 and the Japanese PlayStation Network on October 18, prior to the planned November 22 launch date. The demo consisted of one single-player mission and two co-op VR missions.

E.X. Troopers has visual similarities with the cancelled Mega Man Legends 3. Former senior manager of community, Seth Killian, denied that art assets from the game were reused, and confirmed that E.X. Troopers was already well into development before Mega Man Legends 3 was cancelled. The two games did not initially share development staff, although some team members may have worked on both projects after the cancellation.

=== Nintendo 3DS version ===
The Nintendo 3DS version of E.X. Troopers lacks online services for multiplayer, but supports local play and a bonus "AR Marker" feature that activates in response to images from the game's website. This feature displays one of six of the game's characters (Bren, TeeKee, Chris, Julie, Luan and Gingira) in Augmented Reality allowing the player to use inputs to have the chosen character perform emotes or attacks.

Otherwise, the game utilizes the two screens with the top screen supporting Stereoscopic 3D at all times and the touch screen handling numerous user interface options including the minimap and the E.X. Thermal Blast inputs (mapped onto the L2 and R2 buttons for the PlayStation 3 version). Like Capcom's Monster Hunter 3 Ultimate and Resident Evil: Revelations, the game supports the Circle Pad Pro for additional control support.

While the PlayStation 3 version has one save file assigned to each PlayStation 3 account, the Nintendo 3DS version has two save slots assigned to each cartridge, or game file in the case of the downloaded version.

=== PlayStation 3 version ===
HexaDrive supported the development of the release on PlayStation 3 to run at 720p HD. In addition to using high resolution assets and more detailed effects than the portable version, it supports online multiplayer and trophies. This version is compatible with the Sixaxis and DualShock 3 controllers.

=== Soundtrack ===
Music for the game was composed by Yasumasa Kitagawa and published by Suleputer. The albums also include performances by Yū Kobayashi (voice of W.I.Z), Miyuki Sawashiro (voice of Julie), and Saori Hayami (voice of TeeKee). A total of 23 songs were placed into E.X.TROOPERS - The Bounded Soundtrack, which received a physical release on November 21, 2012, a day before the game's official release.

Capcom shared "Re@union with you" with fans on the first anniversary of E.X. Troopers' launch, and a remix of "The Resonance" (along with English lyrics and artwork) on their second anniversary. The E.X. Troopers - Original Soundtrack (containing a total of 115 tracks from the game) and E.X.TROOPERS - END OF CONVERSATION - EP (containing a total of 6 original tracks) both went on sale in online-only form through the iTunes Store on November 20, 2015, two days before the game's third release anniversary.

=== Localization ===
Although Capcom Japan initially filed U.S. and European trademarks in November 2011 for E.X. Troopers, there were no intentions for its localization anywhere outside of Japan. No new plans for a localization of the game have been announced as of April 4, 2017, but as of November 23, 2022, an unofficial English translation has been made available for both PS3 and 3DS.

== Marketing and release ==
Japanese animation studio Satelight created a two-minute promotional anime advertisement for the game. Onsen Radio featured a biweekly segment, the E.X. Troopers Gingira broadcasting station, on Thursdays from August 23 to December 27, 2012. The program was hosted by Shintaro Kojima (producer) and Yū Kobayashi (voice of W.I.Z).

Alongside the standard edition of the game, there was a Limited Edition version of the game delivered on launch day through e-Capcom for both the Nintendo 3DS and PlayStation 3. Each E.X. Troopers Limited Edition set contained a standard copy of the game, a 1/8 scale pre-painted TeeKee figure, and two rubber straps (one featuring TeeKee and an additional random character selected from Bren, Chris, Julie, or Luan).

The game was released exclusively in Japan to retail customers for Nintendo 3DS and PlayStation 3 on November 22, 2012. Digital versions of the game were also released two months later, on January 24, 2013.

=== Downloadable content ===
A series of SP (Special Promotional) Missions were given to players weekly following the game's release through SpotPass for the Nintendo 3DS version and through the game's menu for the PlayStation 3 version. Currently, all five extra levels are readily available to players completely free of charge and be accessed through the VR Mission menu.

Various "secret codes" were found on Capcom's own website, as well as on retail store signs and in cross-promotional products like magazines and comics (Weekly Famitsu, Dengeki PlayStation, Newtype Ace, Kerokero Ace). Players can use these codes by inputting them at the in-game console and unlock various items including costumes, weapon blueprints, and food. Many codes unlock content which is part of a collaboration between the game and other parties ranging from external companies like Zoff & Otsuka Pharmaceutical but also other Capcom franchises like Monster Hunter.

== Reception ==
In the Japanese video game magazine, Famitsu, E.X. Troopers scored a rating of 34/40 (9/9/8/8) for the Nintendo 3DS version and 32/40 (8/8/8/8) for the PlayStation 3 version. However, since the title was only released in Japan, it was not professionally reviewed for English-speaking audiences. Impressions from available previews of the game were nonetheless largely positive, and players have expressed their interest in seeing it translated for a wider release.

Kotaku explains that "Lost Planet is a serious sci-fi/action series with a plot built around drama and treachery. E.X. Troopers is a lighthearted "save the world" adventure in a school setting with mystical shamans and Gundam robots. While both take place in the same universe and even on the same world, the tone, plot, and much of the lore feels completely different". They also complimented the manga art style, saying "the bright cel-shaded graphics are a joy to look at and the manga framing of the cutscenes is a creative way to tell the story". It also said the game is "simple to pick up and play", and noted the "co-op supports the single player". The site has mixed responses to the fact that the game "takes everything about Lost Planet and twists it", and that you get the "same enemies again and again".

NintendoLife wrote that "graphics don't make a game, but they can help a good one become great. The presentation in E.X. Troopers is flawless, but most important of all it's consistent and it enhances what was already there, highlighting the hot-blooded cast and underlining the plot in a way that just wouldn't work if it was done differently. E.X. Troopers is different, proud of it, and we're all the better for having it."

BitParade concluded their review by saying that "the beautiful simplicity behind its combat, and its razor-sharp speed and progression, are the culmination of carefully designing a game from the ground up for the portable format", claiming that E.X. Troopers was a more effective big budget effort for the 3DS than Resident Evil: Revelations (both being 2012 Capcom 3DS releases).

=== Sales ===
The game sold 17,402 copies on the Nintendo 3DS and 8,717 copies on the PlayStation 3 within the first week of release in Japan, marking it as the weakest debut for a Lost Planet title at the time. This may have been partially attributed from E.X. Troopers competing with the high-selling Call of Duty: Black Ops II, which was released during the same time period.
