= Jun Takeuchi =

Japanese video game director and producer

- 竹内 潤
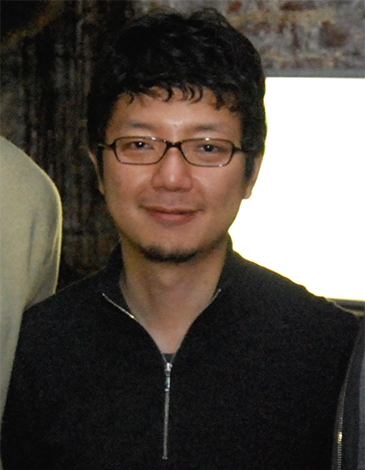
- Takeuchi in 2010
- Born: August 11, 1970 (age 56); Toyonaka, Osaka, Japan
- Education: Sozosha College of Design
- Occupations: Video game designer, game director, game producer
- Employer: Capcom (1991–present)
- Known for: Resident Evil series Onimusha series Lost Planet series
- Title: Managing Corporate officer at Capcom's board of directors. Head of Consumer Games Development Division 1 at Capcom.

Jun Takeuchi (竹内 潤, Takeuchi Jun) (born August 11, 1970) is a Japanese video game director, designer and producer.

Takeuchi graduated from the Graphics Division at Sozosha College of Design and began working at the game development company Capcom in 1991. He produced Onimusha 3 and Lost Planet, and chiefly produced Resident Evil 5. He worked on other Capcom games such as Street Fighter II for the Super Nintendo Entertainment System and Resident Evil and Resident Evil 2 for the PlayStation.

In 2012, Takeuchi became head of Capcom's Development Division 1, which developed Resident Evil, Devil May Cry and other titles for the Western world.

== Works ==
Year	Game	Role
1991	Super Ghouls 'n Ghosts	Background designer
1991	Street Fighter II: The World Warrior	Visual designer
1992	Mega Man 5	Visual designer
1992	Street Fighter II: Champion Edition	Visual designer
1993	Final Fight 2	Background designer
1993	Super Street Fighter II: The New Challengers	Staff
1996	Resident Evil	Character modeller, Motion design
1998	Resident Evil 2	Motion design
2001	Onimusha: Warlords	Director
2002	Onimusha 2: Samurai's Destiny	Player animator
2003	Onimusha Blade Warriors	Producer
2004	Mobile Suit Gundam: Gundam vs. Zeta Gundam	Producer
2004	Onimusha 3: Demon Siege	Line producer, character animator
2006	Lost Planet: Extreme Condition	Producer
2007	Resident Evil: The Umbrella Chronicles	Advisor
2009	Resident Evil 5	Producer
2010	Lost Planet 2	Producer
2017	Resident Evil 7: Biohazard	Executive producer
2019	Resident Evil 2	Executive producer
2019	Devil May Cry 5	Executive producer
2019	Shinsekai: Into the Depths	Executive producer
2020	Resident Evil 3	Executive producer
2021	Ghosts 'n Goblins Resurrection	Executive producer
2021	Resident Evil Village	Executive producer
2023	Resident Evil 4	Executive producer
2024	Dragon's Dogma 2	Executive producer
2024	Kunitsu-Gami: Path of the Goddess	Executive producer
2024	Dead Rising Deluxe Remaster	Executive producer
2026	Resident Evil Requiem	Executive producer
2026	Pragmata	Executive producer
2027	Resident Evil Veronica	Executive producer
