= Legendary (video game) =

2008 video game

- Developer: Spark Unlimited
- Publishers: NA: Gamecock Media Group; PAL: Atari Europe
- Producer: John H. Garcia Shelton
- Designer: Stephen J. Skelton
- Artist: Steven Firchow
- Composers: Jack Grillo; Ricardo Hernandez
- Engine: Unreal Engine 3
- Platforms: PlayStation 3, Microsoft Windows, Xbox 360
- Release: Xbox 360: EU: October 24, 2008; NA: November 4, 2008; AU: December 4, 2008; PlayStation 3: NA: November 4, 2008; EU: November 7, 2008; AU: December 4, 2008; Microsoft Windows: NA: November 18, 2008; EU: November 21, 2008; AU: December 4, 2008
- Genre: First-person shooter
- Modes: Single-player, multiplayer

Legendary (previously known as Legendary: The Box) is a first-person shooter video game developed by Spark Unlimited and released in 2008. It was published in North America by Gamecock Media Group, and in the PAL region by Atari Europe.

The game takes place in New York City and London. The protagonist is a professional thief named Charles Deckard, who is hired by a mysterious organization known as the Black Order to steal an artifact from a New York museum which turns out to be the fabled Pandora's Box. Unaware of the Box's nature, Deckard opens it, unleashing a plethora of mythological creatures rampaging throughout the world, as well as granting him a strange power (the Signet) which could be the key to resolving this crisis. It is up to Deckard and a secret paramilitary force known as the Council of 98 to set things right, while the Black Order seeks to acquire the box and control the creatures to conquer the world.

== Gameplay ==
Gameplay is similar to many other titles in the genre of first-person shooters, with a strong focus on immersion and penetrating atmosphere, creating a first person movie-like experience. Several different weapons can be found and equipped, generally being taken from dead humans. The only melee weapon available in the game is a fire axe, which cannot be removed from the player character's inventory. In addition to the axe, two other weapons can be carried, as well as grenades and molotovs. The player also has access to a PDA-style journal, which updates with messages as data is found and whenever Deckard is given orders or instructions. It also includes detailed information on the monsters and weapons encountered. Throughout the gameworld, numerous objects must be interacted with to proceed, including switches. wheels and lockboxes. The player's health is monitored by a bar in the corner of the screen, while Animus energy is represented by a spherical gauge. Animus energy can be collected by killing monsters, which leave behind bluish gaseous residue. The player can then absorb the residue, replenishing the Animus gauge. This energy can then be used to heal the player, or to send destructive pulses towards monsters (human enemies are not affected by this), stunning them. Additionally, certain objects must be fed Animus energy in order to function properly.

=== Multiplayer ===
There is one mode in multiplayer, which can be played with up to 8 people online or through system link (1 player per console). Multiplayer pits the Council of 98 and the Black Order against each other. The multiplayer portion's objective is not to kill as many opposing team members as possible. The objective is to collect Animus Energy and put it into a machine. The team that fills up the machine first wins. There are creatures on the field, and the player has to kill them in order to harvest Animus Energy. The creatures automatically attack team members with the lower amount of Animus Energy in their machine.

== Plot ==
The game's prologue slide show shows the original myth of Pandora's Box; in reality, Pandora's Box was a device of incredible power. In the early 21st century, archaeologists found the artifact in a ruin at the bottom of the ocean. Unable to pinpoint its origins, they place the artifact in a New York City museum for safe keeping. A wealthy millionaire named Ormond LeFey, knowing the true nature of the box, hires a professional thief named Charles Deckard, tasking him with opening the box, and stealing the contents inside (with, of course, a substantial payment).

The game opens with Deckard sneaking into the museum, easily bypassing all the security and opening the box. When he does, he has a Signet branded onto his left hand, and the box suddenly releases a huge energy surge that shoots toward the sky. Deckard gains the ability to absorb Animus Energy, which he can use to heal himself. He escapes the museum to discover that griffins have materialized, and are flying through the city attacking people.

After fighting various mythical creatures summoned by the box, Deckard finds out that LeFey has sent his private army, known as the Black Order, against him. He fights his way through those soldiers, eventually meeting up with the Council of 98, the group that originally concealed the box. They are distrusting at first, especially their commander, Lexington White Deer, but eventually agree to help upon seeing the Signet on Deckard's arm. A deal is struck; in exchange for his associate Vivian Kane's information on the Black Order's plans, the Council will help them.

After defeating a golem, The Council takes Deckard, Kane, and the box to where the headquarters of the Council is stationed: beneath the Houses of Parliament in London. After a mission to locate a hard drive detailing LeFey's plans in an abandoned cathedral, Deckard finds out that LeFey has built a machine that could harness Animus Energy and control the creatures. He aims to use it to take over the world. The surge of energy could also find its way to Deckard's Signet, and the energy surge could kill him.

Suddenly, the power goes out. It turns out that the hard drive also contained a Trojan Horse, which powered off all the power in the facility. All the creatures that they were keeping are released. The hard drive also gave the location of the headquarters away, and Black Order soldiers land and attack. Deckard and all the Council soldiers get up onto the roof, where they wait for reinforcements from other parts of the world. Suddenly, a Kraken surfaces in the Thames and attacks. Firing several rockets down the Kraken's mouth, Deckard succeeds in killing the Kraken. While the Council was distracted, however, the Black Order manages to steal Pandora's Box, and kidnap Vivian Kane. Deckard and the Council chase after them back to New York City.

In New York City, Deckard and the Council launch a full-scale attack on the Black Order headquarters. Inside the building, he manages to free Vivian, and she goes up the command post to help Deckard. On the roof, Deckard finds the machine. It turns out that Deckard can overload the machine, and destroy it by putting a lot of Animus Energy inside of it. In the end, the machine overloads, and then explodes. LeFey is hurled out of his control booth by a werewolf, grabbed in midair by a griffin and impaled on the machine, killing him. After the explosion, Vivian is nowhere to be seen. The Council arrives, and assumes that she was vaporized. The Council immediately turns on Deckard, locking him up, stating that Deckard's Signet contains information that could create a new Pandora's Box, the first one being destroyed when the machine exploded. Later, it turns out that Vivian survived, and Deckard, being a thief, easily escapes. A final picture shows Deckard holding his Signet branded hand out to a griffin, seemingly taming it.

== Reception ==
Reception

Aggregate score
Aggregator	Score		
Aggregator	PC	PS3	Xbox 360
Metacritic	50/100	50/100	47/100

Review scores
Publication	Score		
Publication	PC	PS3	Xbox 360
The A.V. Club	B−	B−	B−
Edge	N/A	N/A	4/10
Eurogamer	N/A	N/A	2/10
Game Informer	6.5/10	6.5/10	6.5/10
GameDaily	N/A	7/10	N/A
GameRevolution	N/A	N/A	D−
GameSpot	3.5/10	N/A	3.5/10
GameZone	5/10	5.6/10	7.5/10
IGN	2.5/10	2.3/10	2.5/10
Official Xbox Magazine (US)	N/A	N/A	7.5/10
PC Gamer (UK)	40%	N/A	N/A
PlayStation: The Official Magazine	N/A	3/5	N/A
Variety	N/A	N/A	(mixed)

The PC and PlayStation 3 versions of Legendary received "mixed" reviews, while the Xbox 360 version received "generally unfavorable reviews", according to the review aggregation website Metacritic. Eurogamer noted that the Xbox 360 version was "hilariously bad" citing unresponsive movement and twitchy crosshairs as well as Spark Unlimited managing "to take Unreal Engine 3 and make it look like a 1997 Half-Life mod". X360 Magazine (later X-ONE Magazine) faulted the game for unskippable cutscenes and "action sections that feel like a movie you just happen to be walking through, and not interacting with." IGN said of the PC and Xbox 360 versions, "the gameplay comes across as messy and incomplete, the arrangement of hazards and threats from monsters is ineffective at best and boring at worst." It also noted the PS3 version's long load times, frame drops and a lack of trophy support. According to The UrbanWire, the game "falls short".

== Cancelled Sequel ==
A sequel was pitched at some point after the release of the game, although it was cancelled in favor of another pitch based on the 1986 film Highlander, which also got cancelled in favor of Lost Planet 3.
