= Edward F. Cantasano =

American mechanic

Edward F. Cantasano (November 25, 1905 – January 17, 1989) also known as Mario Contasino, was an unemployed mechanic from Yonkers who, on December 13, 1931, accidentally hit the future Prime Minister of the United Kingdom, Winston Churchill, while driving a car. Churchill was attempting to cross a busy New York City street at the time, and forgot to look in the direction of the oncoming traffic. This incident, while only briefly acknowledged by leading historical works about Churchill, has nonetheless provided the inspiration for several counterfactual analyses of Churchill’s role during World War II.

== The crash with Churchill ==
Shortly after 10:30 p.m. on December 13, 1931, Churchill attempted to cross Fifth Avenue in New York City and was struck by a car driven by Cantasano. The crash occurred because Churchill apparently forgot that, in the United States, traffic on two-way roadways keeps to the right whereas in his native United Kingdom it keeps to the left. Churchill was riding in a taxicab and looking for the home of financier Bernard Baruch, but he did not remember Baruch's address. So that he could check out a particular building that he hoped was Baruch's, Churchill asked his taxicab driver to stop in the middle of Fifth Avenue (which at that time was a two-way roadway), between 76th Street and 77th Street. Churchill got out of the cab in the middle of the roadway and looked to his left. Seeing the headlights of an oncoming car more than 200 yards away, he thought that he was safe and headed across the street, forgetting to look for traffic coming from his right. He was hit by the car driven by Cantasano.

The British statesman suffered a serious scalp wound as well as two cracked ribs and was admitted to Lenox Hill Hospital, where he later told police that the crash was entirely his fault. Nevertheless, Cantasano, who felt he was to blame, repeatedly called the hospital to see how Churchill was doing. Concerned that Cantasano would be blamed and then have trouble finding work, Churchill finally arranged to meet him at the Waldorf-Astoria Hotel. Churchill served Cantasano tea and gave him an autographed copy of his book, "The Unknown War." Edward F. Cantasano's name was misreported by journalists at the time as Mario Contasino, and the incident itself eventually faded into the background of Churchill's life. Cantasano himself was nearly forgotten entirely, until interest in the event was revived almost 70 years later.

== The search for Mario Contasino ==
In January 2008, video game publisher Codemasters launched a search for the descendants of Mario Contasino in order to honor his contribution to history. The search was inspired by a video game published by the company, Turning Point: Fall of Liberty, which presents a counterfactual view of history in which the automobile crash where Contasino struck Churchill proved fatal. A diary of the search was being recorded in an ongoing blog:

Evidence unearthed during the search for Contasino has revealed his real name as Edward F. Cantasano, and that he was 26 at the time of the crash with Churchill. According to the new information, Cantasano was living in Westchester, New York, when he enlisted in the Army in 1942. He died on January 17, 1989, and was buried in Long Island, New York. Searchers are hopeful that this new information may lead to the discovery of the man's relatives.
