= Lost Planet 3 =

2013 video game

- Developer: Spark Unlimited
- Publisher: Capcom
- Director: Matthew Sophos
- Producer: Kevin Scharff
- Designers: Richard Gaubert; Edward Moore
- Programmer: Ike Macoco
- Artist: Mark Daniel Cabuco
- Writers: Richard Gaubert; Orion Walker; Matthew Sophos
- Composer: Jack Wall
- Series: Lost Planet
- Engine: Unreal Engine 3
- Platforms: Microsoft Windows, PlayStation 3, Xbox 360
- Release: PlayStation 3, Xbox 360: NA: August 27, 2013; JP/AU: August 29, 2013; EU: August 30, 2013; Microsoft Windows: NA: August 27, 2013; EU: August 30, 2013; JP/AU: September 26, 2013
- Genres: Third-person shooter, action-adventure
- Modes: Single-player, multiplayer

Lost Planet 3 (ロスト プラネット 3, Rosuto Puranetto 3) is a third-person shooter action-adventure video game developed by Spark Unlimited and published by Capcom for Microsoft Windows, PlayStation 3 and Xbox 360. The game is a prequel to Lost Planet: Extreme Condition and Lost Planet 2, and takes place on the same planet of E.D.N. III. The game takes a more story-driven narrative approach to the campaign similar to the first game. Unlike the previous games in the series, which were developed internally by Capcom, the game was developed externally by Spark Unlimited with Matt Sophos serving as game director, though series creator Kenji Oguro was still attached as franchise creative director.

Additionally, the game can be purchased from the Xbox digital store and played on Xbox One and Xbox Series consoles through the Xbox backwards compatibility program.

== Plot ==
A prequel, Lost Planet 3 takes place long before the first game, following the story of Jim Peyton revealing the events that led to the first game.

After nearly being buried alive in a cave an elderly Jim Peyton is found by his granddaughter Diana. Realizing that he does not have long to live he begins to tell her how he came to be on E.D.N. III. Fifty years earlier looking to support his family, Jim joins an expedition to mine the resources of E.D.N III. Funded by the NEVEC corporation, the expedition hopes to tap E.D.N III's "Thermal Energy", a blood like substance that could solve the Earth Energy problem. Jim meets Dr. Kendric Kovac, operations director Phil Braddock, Doctor Roman, head technician Gale and fellow Rig pilot Laroche. On a job to repair the comms relay, Jim begins to suspect there is a saboteur on the base when he sees someone near the damaged relays. He finds that Doctor Roman has had similar sightings, but dismisses his suspicions and focuses on working to support his family.

Some time later Jim stumbles upon an abandoned NEVEC base revealing that the expedition crew were not the first ones to land on E.D.N III as they were told. The last records detail the Akrid attacking the base and killing the inhabitants. Attempting to leave, Jim fights a massive Akrid leaving his rig damaged and himself close to death before he is saved by the woman he saw at the comms relay. He awakens in a settlement a few days later, healed. The woman introduces herself as Mira and her people as "The Forgotten", survivors of NEVEC's first colonization attempt. Their leader Soichi, Mira's father, does not trust Jim but allows him to leave their enclave after repaying his debt under the agreement that he not reveal their existence.

Returning to base he finds it under attack by Akrid, the result of an experiment by Dr. Kovac, who's been studying how to control them. Jim confronts Braddock with his discovery of the first colony. Braddock explains that his father was the colony's leader before it was lost, and that to maintain the expedition's funding from NEVEC he must keep the incident secret. Jim agrees to keep the colony secret and help him investigate what happened, keeping the Forgotten a secret. Several months pass and with the Forgotten's help Jim is able to retrieve information on what happened and give it to Braddock. He is shocked to find that when the colony was attacked his father abandoned it to save Braddock and his mother. Jim tries to tell Braddock about the Forgotten but is cut short when he must defend the base from an Akrid. In the following months Jim grows closer to the Forgotten and the Expedition, planning to bring Braddock and Soichi together so they can resolve their pasts.

Before he can NEVEC unexpectedly takes over the Expedition. They begin looking for Dr. Roman, who with Jim's help has been working on triangulating the purest veins of Thermal Energy, however he finds Dr. Roman dead and in a fit of rage kills a NEVEC soldier nearby who presumably murdered her. Now determined to stop NEVEC Jim and the Forgotten prepare to sabotage their mining efforts with Gale's help. While enacting their plan however they are confronted by Laroche who has been sent by NEVEC to stop them. He reveals that he called NEVEC to the base after seeing Jim meet with Mira, and that NEVEC is attacking the Forgotten. Jim defeats Laroche but spares him and makes his way to the Forgotten's settlement. Soichi is killed and Jim forced to surrender when he finds NEVEC has taken his family hostage.

Using Dr. Roman's stolen research combined with Dr. Kovacs smarts, NEVEC has a plan to save Earth. Braddock helps Jim escape and free his family and the crew, including Laroche, despite his actions. He sacrifices himself to kill Neven's soldiers. Pursuing NEVEC's field commander Isenberg, Jim ruins his plan to take control of the Akrid and use them to wipe out the rebels and so NEVEC are not able to mine the living planet of pure energy and save Earth, putting a stop to Isenberg's plan by killing him but nearly dying himself.

With NEVEC defeated the expedition crew and the Forgotten become the first snow pirates. Gale and Mira use Soichi's research to create the Harmonizer, a device that uses thermal energy to heal the user. In the present Jim apologizes to his granddaughter for leaving a legacy where she has been forced to fight before dying. An elderly Laroche finds them and rescues Diana. Diana is saddened by her grandfather's passing but looks forward to the possibility of winning the war and taking the planet back from NEVEC.

== Gameplay ==
Using the game's mission-based mechanics, players can choose to take on core quests that progress the story, or side-quests to help out fellow colonists on the planet. The game will allow players to openly explore areas in a style similar to role-playing games with the ability to talk to non-player characters, obtain side-quests, upgrade equipment and build their own bipedal rigs using items gathered throughout the campaign. Thermal energy will no longer be tied to the characters' life support, and instead will primarily be used as a form of currency, giving the player more freedom to explore E.D.N. III. Once again, the antagonists of the game are the Akrid, "aliens" indigenous to the planet of E.D.N. III.

== Reception ==
Reception

Aggregate score
Aggregator	Score		
Aggregator	PC	PS3	Xbox 360
Metacritic	61/100	61/100	58/100

Review scores
Publication	Score		
Publication	PC	PS3	Xbox 360
Destructoid	5.5/10	N/A	N/A
Electronic Gaming Monthly	N/A	N/A	6.5/10
Eurogamer	N/A	N/A	4/10
Famitsu	N/A	33/40	33/40
Game Informer	N/A	6/10	6/10
GameSpot	5/10	5/10	5/10
GameTrailers	N/A	N/A	7.7/10
GameZone	7/10	N/A	N/A
IGN	6.2/10	6.2/10	6.2/10
Joystiq	2.5/5	N/A	N/A
PlayStation Official Magazine – UK	N/A	6/10	N/A
Official Xbox Magazine (US)	N/A	N/A	5/10
Polygon	N/A	N/A	7/10
Digital Spy	N/A	2/5	N/A
The Escapist	N/A	N/A	3/5

Lost Planet 3 received "mixed" reviews on all platforms according to the review aggregation website Metacritic. In Japan, Famitsu gave the PlayStation 3 and Xbox 360 versions a score of one nine, one eight, one seven, and one nine for a total of 33 out of 40.

The Escapist gave the Xbox 360 version three stars out of five and called it "a solid third person shooter [that] is marred by some repetitive gameplay elements and a lack of depth with its mechanics and story". However, The Digital Fix gave the PS3 version a score of four out of ten and stated: "Two positive things to take away from everything is [sic] that it is arguably the best game Spark have ever produced and is not as bad as Aliens: Colonial Marines". Digital Spy gave it a similar score of two stars out of five and said it was not "a lost cause. There's some genuine emotion to be found in its storyline and a spattering of variety to its combat, but this is marred by unoriginal core gameplay and lackluster level design".

Lost Planet 3 sold 27,503 PlayStation 3 copies on the first week of being on sale in Japan, the lowest sales debut out of the numbered installments of the series. Reporting on its fiscal year, Capcom described the game's sales as "below expectations", "due in part to intensifying competition in the European and US markets".

=== Awards ===
In January 2014, Lost Planet 3 writers Richard Gaubert, Orion Walker and Matt Sophos were nominated for Outstanding Achievement in Videogame Writing by the Writers Guild of America along with Assassin’s Creed IV: Black Flag, Batman: Arkham Origins, God of War: Ascension and The Last of Us (the latter of which was a winner).
