= Lost Planet: Extreme Condition =

2006 video game

- Developer: Capcom
- Publisher: Capcom
- Director: Kenji Oguro
- Producer: Jun Takeuchi
- Artist: Takahiro Kawano
- Writer: Tomoyuki Hosokawa
- Composers: Akihiko Narita; Shuji Uchiyama
- Series: Lost Planet
- Engine: MT Framework
- Platforms: Xbox 360, Microsoft Windows, PlayStation 3
- Release: December 21, 2006: Xbox 360; JP: December 21, 2006; WW: January 12, 2007; Windows; NA: June 26, 2007; PAL: June 29, 2007; PlayStation 3; JP: February 21, 2008; NA: February 26, 2008; AU: February 27, 2008; EU: February 29, 2008; Colonies Edition; Xbox 360, Windows; NA: May 27, 2008; JP: May 29, 2008; EU: June 6, 2008
- Genre: Third-person shooter
- Modes: Single-player, multiplayer

Lost Planet: Extreme Condition (ロスト プラネット エクストリーム コンディション, Rosuto Puranetto Ekusutorīmu Kondishon) is a third-person shooter video game developed and published by Capcom for Xbox 360, Microsoft Windows and PlayStation 3. The game was released in Japan in December 2006 and worldwide in January 2007. Originally intended to be an Xbox 360 exclusive, it was later ported and released for Microsoft Windows in June 2007 and PlayStation 3 in February 2008.

Additionally, the game can be purchased from the Xbox digital store and played on Xbox One and Xbox Series consoles through the Xbox backwards compatibility program.

== Gameplay ==
The game is played through a third person over-the-shoulder view. Players are allowed to switch between first-person and third-person at any moment. Players either travel on foot or ride various types of mechanized suits called Vital Suits (VSs). VSs carry heavy weapons such as chain guns and rocket launchers. They can pick up weapons lying on the ground and fire multiple weapons at once. On foot, players are able to use a grappling hook to pull themselves up to normally hard-to-reach places, or to hook onto a VS and hijack it. Driving VSs and using certain weapons requires thermal energy. Also, the planet's cold temperature causes the characters' thermal energy level to continually decrease. Players can replenish their thermal energy level by defeating enemies or activating data posts. Data posts also allow players to use their navigational radars to see incoming enemies. Each of the 11 levels is accompanied by a boss, which can be either a VS or a large Akrid.

=== Multiplayer ===
Players engaging in an online battle.

Online multiplayer versus also requires players to monitor their thermal energy level, but here, reaching zero does not cause death. Instead, the characters cannot use VSs or fire the weapons which require thermal energy. Online multiplayer versus consists of four modes, called Elimination, Team Elimination, Post Grab, and Fugitive. Players score points by killing other players and activating posts, and they lose points for being killed or committing suicide. Post grab is a mode where players on opposite teams compete to capture as many posts as possible before the set time runs out. Team Elimination is a 16-player team competition, and Elimination is a 16-player free-for-all mode. Finally, Fugitive is a game mode where one person is marked as a fugitive, and the other players try to take away all the fugitive's points before time runs out.

== Synopsis ==
=== Setting ===
Lost Planet takes place in the year known in the game as T.C. -80, 80 years before the trial century, on the planet of E.D.N. III. After the Earth's conditions become too hostile for humans due to war, global warming and pollution, an interstellar megacorporation named Neo-Venus Construction (NEVEC) plans to colonize E.D.N. III, a new Earth-like planet in the grip of a brutal ice age. NEVEC discovers that E.D.N. III is inhabited by an aggressive and territorial insectoid alien species named the Akrid, which come in all shapes and sizes and generate their own precious thermal energy. 150 years after a great war was fought in which the humans lost to the Akrid, civilian colonists and E.D.N. III military personnel continue to seek out a nomadic existence as "snow pirates", harvesting T-ENG from fallen Akrid. The plot of the game revolves around Wayne Holden, a soldier who attempts to overthrow NEVEC, who still vie for control over E.D.N. III, and help colonization efforts for the remainder of the human race by destroying the Akrid, all the while attempting to survive both betrayals and the extreme conditions of the planet.

=== Plot ===
Gale Holden leads a group of snow pirates on a mission to infiltrate a domed city. During their mission, they are attacked by a giant Akrid known as Green Eye and are forced to retreat. Gale and his son Wayne attempt to fight it but are quickly defeated. Gale's VS explodes while defending Wayne who escapes outside but soon freezes inside his damaged VS, remaining frozen for thirty years. Wayne wakes up and finds himself in the care of Yuri Solotov and his crew of snow pirates; Luka and Rick. Apart from his name and the Green Eye, Wayne remembers nothing of his previous life.

Yuri is particularly interested in the thermal extension (or Harmonizer) attached to Wayne's arm, which has enabled Wayne to survive all this time. Yuri tells Wayne that NEVEC is working on a project designed to thaw out the planet to make it safe to live on. Wayne joins Yuri's band, and while on a mission to wipe out an Akrid hive, fights a woman named Basil. Basil tells him that Yuri has killed her husband and that she was looking for revenge. At the same time, Yuri mysteriously disappears, leaving Wayne to question his loyalty.

With the help of Rick and Luka, Wayne discovers the Green Eye's location and rediscovers Gale's VS which Rick discovers is one of the most technologically advanced models ever built. Wayne uses his father's VS to finally destroy Green Eye but is soon attacked by NEVEC's field commander Bandero. After escaping the attack, Wayne slowly remembers that rather than Green Eye being responsible for killing Gale, it was actually a few NEVEC soldiers with Bandero watching. Wayne and Luka barely escape, only to find that their pirate fortress (trailer) has been sieged, and that Rick has been taken captive.

For the next year, Wayne and Luka initiate hit and run attacks against NEVEC, which has taken control over the human race. During one of their attacks, they discover Rick is still alive, and has been rescued by Basil. Basil and Wayne take a NEVEC trooper named Joe hostage. It is after taking Joe prisoner that Basil goes on to explain that the Harmonizer slows down the aging process and unlocks the powers to Gale's VS.

After they interrogate Joe, they find out more about NEVEC's Frontier Project. He tells them it is NEVEC's plan to make E.D.N. III a safe place to live for humans. After joining the snow pirates, Joe arranges for Wayne to meet with NEVEC leadership, inadvertently leading to an ambush where Bandero shoots Wayne in the leg. During the confrontation, Wayne and Joe learn that the project will use T-ENG to wipe out not only all Akrid but also kill all humans left on the surface while all of NEVEC watches safely from the sky. Horrified, the pirates go on a final mission to stop the project. Wayne confronts Bandero a final time, killing him and regaining his father's rebuilt VS. Wayne finds Yuri, gravely wounded from torture, and before he dies, Yuri gives Wayne an attachment to his Harmonizer that will allow him to unlock the true power of his VS.

While Wayne begins his attack on the Frontier Project's leader, Commander Isenberg, Basil sacrifices herself to buy him time and Joe sets off explosives to destroy the elevator from which NEVEC would hide. Wayne confronts Isenberg and after fighting in VSs, shoots him in the head with a single pistol bullet right before he passes out, losing his memory again. Wayne wakes up to find Luka and Rick starting to melt all of the ice and snow from the planet, and slowly colonization begins once more.

== Development ==
In a 2006 interview with Game Informer, developer Keiji Inafune recalled that Capcom wanted to make a game that took advantage of the medium while also feeling cinematic. Films such as Starship Troopers, The Thing, and the Alien franchise influenced the direction of the game. Inafune in particular noted the idea of fighting alien creatures on a snowy planet was inspired by the Antarctic setting of The Thing. The design of the vital suits were loosely inspired by the Japanese works Armored Trooper VOTOMS and Appleseed. The usage of mecha in Lost Planet was part of a broader goal to cater to both Japanese and Western audiences. Mecha were a common trope in anime and manga, and by 2006, Capcom felt that by 2006 Western audiences had grown accustomed to anime.

Capcom first introduced Lost Planet on December 10, 2005 at an invite only press conference announcing Jun Takeuchi as both the producer and executive producer, Kenji Oguro as the designer and Shin Kurosawa who wrote the original story. At the conference, Capcom announced that they would follow the tradition of basing the main character of their game after a real person. Capcom decided to base the main character Wayne after the famous South Korean star, Lee Byung-hun. The decision to cast Lee was due to his popularity with Japanese filmgoers. To capture the full essence of Lee, Capcom used a program called Face Robot. This allowed Capcom to use Lee's basic expressions and translate them to Wayne in the game. Capcom had Lee dress up in a recreation of Wayne's attire and then did a full body 3D scan to translate Lee into Wayne using a function called GATOR. But instead of using Lee for character animations, the developers did so manually. As for environments, Capcom used up to 300,000 to 600,000 polygons in the screen at once for a single battle. They then used an XSI program and then manually added in elaborate details. One of the main focuses of Lost Planet was to make a game that could be a commercial success in both North America and Japan.

Lost Planet also made an appearance at E3 2006. There, a new trailer debuted and an Xbox Live demo was announced for released by May 11, both multiplayer and single player. At the Expo, Keiji Inafune explained Capcom's reason for choosing the Xbox 360 as the prime console saying: "What the Xbox 360 represents is a great balance. When you think about when it was released, what it can do, how much it costs, the type of games it will have, it's just in a very nice position. The PlayStation 3 being that expensive is going to put it out of the price range of a lot of people, but yet the 360 will still be there. It will still be something that's affordable for enough people. The one disadvantage, unfortunately, is that it did not succeed in Japan". Lost Planet also made an appearance at Leipzig 2006, where it showcased a brand new trailer showing glimpses on online multiplayer. Following its appearance in Leipzig, Lost Planet also appeared at the 2006 Tokyo Game Show and DICE 2009.

The Windows version of the game had two demos with the latter supporting DirectX 10, this was followed by the final release supporting DirectX 9.0c and DirectX 10.

== Marketing and release ==
=== Collector's and Colonies Edition ===
The Collector's Edition of the game was released on January 12, 2007 worldwide. The Collector's Edition included a special edition Steelbook case, an art book including exclusive cover art, multimedia cutscenes, and multiplayer maps that would not be released until months later for free.

Lost Planet: Colonies is a gold edition version of Extreme Condition for Xbox 360 and Microsoft Windows. The game includes new multiplayer maps, a Human vs Akrid multiplayer mode, and a selection of new multiplayer characters and weapons.

Colonies also introduces four new single-player modes: Score Attack (points are given for each kill using combos, akin to the co-op mode in Halo 3), Time Trial Battle Mode (similar to the Arcade mode of Call of Duty 4: Modern Warfare), first person shooter mode, and Unlimited Mode (which must be unlocked). The game also includes cross-platform play between Xbox Live and Games for Windows – Live users. The Colonies edition is not compatible with the original Lost Planet save games or a multiplayer game, so players of each release may only play with others who have the same release. The game was released in North America on May 27, 2008, in Japan on May 29 and in Europe on June 6. The game is available for purchase as a download on Steam. However, it still requires the user to log into a Windows Live account in order to play.

=== Downloadable content ===
Capcom announced three maps packs and another single map for downloadable content. The first map pack was released on March 9, 2007. The pack included "Radar Field" and "Island 902". The second pack was released on April 6 and contained the maps "Hive Complex" and "Trial Point". Then Capcom released the single map pack, "Battle Ground" on June 7 and the final pack on August 16 which included the maps "Lost Technology", "Ruins", and "Ice Drop".

Also on July 16, Capcom announced the first downloadable content for the Microsoft Windows version. The content included new view modes resembling that of the Resident Evil series and new multiplayer maps downloadable on the console versions. The content also included 3 new characters, including Joe from the campaign, Dead Rising's Frank West, and Frank West wearing a Mega Man suit (also unlockable in Dead Rising).

== Reception ==
=== Critical reception ===
Reception

Aggregate scores
Aggregator	Score
GameRankings	(X360) 78.56% (PS3) 70.19% (PC) 67.00%
Metacritic	(X360) 79/100 (PS3) 67/100 (PC) 66/100

Review scores
Publication	Score
1Up.com	(X360/PS3) C+ (PC) C
Eurogamer	(X360) 7/10 (PC) 5/10
GameSpot	(X360) 8.1/10 (PC/PS3) 7/10
GameSpy	(X360) 4/5 (PC/PS3) 3/5
IGN	(X360) 8.5/10 (PC) 5.8/10 (PS3) 5.5/10
VideoGamer.com	(X360/PC) 7/10 (PS3) 6/10

Lost Planet: Extreme Condition received mixed to positive reviews. Aggregating review websites GameRankings and Metacritic gave the Xbox 360 version 78.56% and 79/100, the PlayStation 3 version 70.19% and 67/100 and the PC version 67.00% and 66/100, including a score of 36/40 from Japanese gaming magazine Famitsu, which Gamasutra described as "impressive". The game's visuals and combat were praised, but reviewers criticized the controls, voice acting, and slowdowns in the frame rate. Reviewers were generally in favor of the game's premise and mechanics, and the gameplay was compared to Bionic Commando and Mega Man. The frigid landscape of E.D.N. III was welcomed as a change of pace from the common settings portrayed in other shooters, such as World War II. GameSpy said "[the levels are] evocative in a way that yet another urban wasteland, spaceship interior, or burnt out WWII battlefield can't be". The game's system of forcing the player to constantly search for T-Eng to survive was considered novel, if not particularly challenging. IGN's Erik Brudvig said "the energy doesn't drain fast enough to ever become a serious issue in most stages, but it does provide a nice nudge to the player to keep them moving along towards the next big fight".

Lost Planet's graphics were widely praised on the Xbox 360 and PC versions. VideoGamer.com said "[the game has] some of the most impressive visuals seen on the Xbox 360". Other reviewers referred to the visuals as "astonishing", "gorgeous", and "brilliant looking". There were complaints, however, that the PlayStation 3 version's graphics were not as good. Australia's PALGN said "the Xbox 360 version leaves the PS3 version for dead in terms of overall polish and running speed, though the difference is primarily noticeable when you put the two next to each other. This is very disappointing, given that it's come out a year later". The audio received comments ranging from mediocre to good, and the voice acting was widely panned. GameSpot said "the voice acting is stiff at best, and sounds completely phony at worst". The design of the Akrid was praised, and the enemies were compared to the monsters of Panzer Dragoon, Dune, and Starship Troopers. IGN commented, "from the giant earth worm that looks like it was ripped straight from Frank Herbert's imagination to the giant flying moth that toes the line between beautiful and scary, the big bugs are a sight to behold". The boss battles against giant Akrid were considered massive and epic; PALGN compared them to Shadow of the Colossus. The character design was received less positively, especially the protagonist, Wayne. Reviewers criticized his name, lack of character development, and inability to look up. A common complaint was Lost Planet's story; it was described as confusing, convoluted, and poorly translated. GameSpot said "the story plays out initially as a revenge tale. As the narrative progresses, however, it gets more and more convoluted as characters are introduced and the plot swerves out of control".

Lost Planet's multiplayer component received mixed remarks. Reviewers were generally pleased with the game options available to players, but were disappointed that multiplayer was online only, with no opportunity for cooperative play. GamePro criticized the Xbox 360 version's matchmaking system, which would drop all players from a match if the host disconnected. At the time of its release, the PC version suffered from numerous technical glitches, making online play impossible for many players.

=== Sales ===
The demo for the Xbox 360 version was the second-highest downloaded demo on Xbox Live as of September 2007, and the game was the 10th-most played game on the online service in 2007. The Xbox 360 version was a best-seller in North America and the UK, and was the highest-selling Xbox 360 game in the United States in January 2007 with 329,000 units sold. Capcom shipped a million units of the game worldwide by January 17, 2007, and by the end of March 2007, it had sold 1.37 million units. A year after its release, the Japanese Xbox 360 version had sold 61,555 units and was the 10th-highest selling Xbox 360 game in the region. The PlayStation 3 version was a best-seller in Japan and North America, and entered the British sales charts at position 34 the week of its release. The North American version received a boost in sales in December 2008 when Amazon offered a sale on the title. Both console versions were popular titles on American video game rental company GameFly, with the Xbox 360 version the service's number one rental across all platforms for a time in early 2007. The PC version placed on the list of top 5 sellers in Japan. The combined sales for both versions of Lost Planet are of 2.8 million units.

=== Awards ===
IGN gave the Xbox 360 version their Editor's Choice award, and it won the award for best Xbox 360 game at the Leipzig Games Convention. It ved 1UP.com's award for best action game at the Electronic Entertainment Expo (E3) video game convention in 2006, and an "Award for Excellence" at the 2007 Japan Game Awards. The game's marketing campaign won several awards at the 2007 MI6 awards show hosted by the Association of Electronic Interactive Marketers, including the "Gold" award for its limited edition packaging and "Silver" awards for its promotional poster and theatrical trailer. Lost Planet's audio was nominated for Best Cinematic/Cut-Scene Audio and Sound Design of the Year at the Game Audio Network Guild's 2007 ceremony, but lost both awards to Gears of War.

== Legacy ==
=== Mobile version ===
Lost Planet received a mobile port for phones using the Brew 3.1 Operating system and released on December 21, 2006.

=== Sequels ===
Lost Planet 2 was released and was available for purchase in May 2010. A spin-off titled E.X. Troopers was released in October 2012 in Japan. The third main game titled Lost Planet 3 was released in August 2013.

=== Appearances in other games ===
One of the mech-suits, PTX-40A, appears as a playable character in Tatsunoko vs. Capcom, as one of the two largest characters in the game. There is also an unlockable mini-game set in the Lost Planet universe, where the PTX-40A, Ryu (from the Street Fighter series), Ken the Eagle (from Science Ninja Team Gatchaman) and Tekkaman Blade battle Akrids through several stages.
