= Lost Planet =

- Logo of the first game
- Genre: Third-person shooter
- Developers: Capcom (2006–2012); Spark Unlimited (2013)
- Publisher: Capcom
- Creators: Kenji Oguro; Keiji Inafune
- Platforms: Xbox 360, Microsoft Windows, PlayStation 3, Nintendo 3DS
- First release: Lost Planet: Extreme Condition; December 21, 2006
- Latest release: Lost Planet 3 August 27, 2013

Lost Planet is a video game series of third-person shooters published by Capcom. The series follows a number of protagonists on E.D.N. III, a planet in the process of an ice age, as they survive and fight the environment, various alien creatures and those planning to colonize the planet.

It consists of three main installments, Lost Planet: Extreme Condition (2006), Lost Planet 2 (2010) and Lost Planet 3 (2013) and a spin-off titled E.X. Troopers (2012). While Capcom developed Lost Planet, Lost Planet 2 and E.X. Troopers internally, Spark Unlimited were hired as an external developer for Lost Planet 3.

As of December 31, 2025, the game series has sold 6.9 million units worldwide.

== Games ==
Release timeline
2006	Lost Planet: Extreme Condition
2007
2008	Lost Planet: Extreme Condition Colonies Edition
2009
2010	Lost Planet 2
2011
2012	E.X. Troopers
2013	Lost Planet 3

=== Lost Planet: Extreme Condition (2006) ===
The first Lost Planet game takes place in the year known in the game as T.C. -80 on the fictional planet of E.D.N. III. After the Earth's conditions become too hostile for humans due to war, global warming and pollution, a fictional interstellar megacorporation named Neo-Venus Construction (NEVEC) plans to colonize E.D.N. III, a new Earth-like planet in the grip of a brutal ice age. NEVEC discovers that E.D.N. III is inhabited by an aggressive and territorial insectoid alien species named the Akrid, which come in all shapes and sizes and generate their own precious thermal energy. 150 years after a great war was fought in which the humans lost to the Akrid, the plot of the game revolves around Wayne Holden, a "snow pirate" who attempts to overthrow the ruthless NEVEC, who still vie for control over E.D.N. III, and help colonization efforts for the remainder of the human race by destroying the Akrid, all the while attempting to survive both betrayals and the extreme conditions of the planet.

Lost Planet received mixed reviews on the PlayStation 3 and PC, but more positive reception for the Xbox 360 version which was the original lead platform. The game shipped over a million copies worldwide by January 2007 marking Capcom's second million seller for Xbox 360. As of March 2016, the game has sold over 1,600,000 copies on the Xbox 360 alone including downloadable copies. IGN gave the Xbox 360 version their Editor's Choice award, and it won the award for best Xbox 360 game at the Leipzig Games Convention.

==== Lost Planet: Extreme Condition Colonies Edition (2008) ====
The Colonies Edition is a gold edition version of Extreme Condition for the Xbox 360 and PC with new multiplayer maps, a Human vs Akrid multiplayer mode, and a selection of new multiplayer characters and weapons.

Colonies also introduces four new single-player modes: Score Attack (points are given for each kill using combos), Time Trial Battle Mode, first person shooter mode, and Unlimited Mode. The game also includes cross-platform play between Xbox Live and Games for Windows – Live users. The Colonies Edition is not compatible with the original Lost Planet save games or multiplayer game, so players of each release may only play with others who have the same release. The game was released in North America on May 27, 2008; in Japan on May 29; and in Europe on June 6.

The Xbox 360 version saw positive reception in comparison to a mixed response for the PC version.

=== Lost Planet 2 (2010) ===
Lost Planet 2 is the sequel to Lost Planet: Extreme Condition, taking place ten years after the events of the first game, on the same fictional planet. It is both developed and published by Capcom. The game was released for the PlayStation 3 and Xbox 360 on May 11, 2010, in the United States and in Europe (on May 20 in Japan). It was also released for Microsoft Windows for North America on October 12 and for Europe on October 15.

Lost Planet 2 sold 1,900,000 copies between all platforms by March 2016 and across all platforms. Reception for the PlayStation 3 version matched the Xbox 360 version, however the PC version saw notable criticism.

=== E.X. Troopers (2012) ===
E.X. Troopers is a spin-off game of the Lost Planet series, it is developed by Capcom and released only in Japan for Nintendo 3DS and PlayStation 3 on November 22, 2012. The game added new and more dangerous hostile Akrid enemies along with several new weapons. Some revisions include a focus on lock-on-based movement and shooting both on foot and in Vital Suits akin to Gundam vs Gundam as well as a series of Monster Hunter elements as the title shared the producer of recent installments of that series.

The game saw lower sales than other games in the Lost Planet franchise, but positive reception from Famitsu. It also possesses a cult following leading to the western Capcom branch addressing interest and the Japanese branch releasing music tracks on the anniversary of the game's release.

=== Lost Planet 3 (2013) ===
Lost Planet 3 is the third numbered entry in the series and was developed by Spark Unlimited instead of internally by Capcom. It was released on the PlayStation 3, Xbox 360, and Microsoft Windows in August 2013 and takes place in the same ice-age like environment as the first instead of the varied environments of the second.

While all versions of the game received a mixed reception, Famitsu offered praise in their review for the renewed story focus.

== Development ==
The main character, Wayne, shown in a promotional advertisement for the first Lost Planet

Capcom first introduced Lost Planet on December 10, 2005, at an invite only press conference announcing Jun Takeuchi as both the producer and executive producer, Kenji Oguro as the designer and Shin Kurosawa who wrote the original story. At the conference, Capcom announced that they would follow the tradition of basing the main character of their game after a real person. Capcom decided to base the main character Wayne after the famous Korean star, Byung Hun Lee. To capture the full essence of Lee, Capcom used a program called Face Robot. This allowed Capcom to use Lee's basic expressions and translate them to Wayne in the game. Capcom had Lee dress up in a recreation of Waynes attire and then did full body 3D scan to translate Lee into Wayne using a function called GATOR. But instead of using Lee for character animations, the developers did so manually. As for environments, Capcom used up to 300,000 to 600,000 polygons in the screen at once for a single battle. They then used an XSI program and then manually added in elaborate details. One of the main focuses of Lost Planet was to make a game that could be a commercial success in both North America and Japan.

Lost Planet 2 runs on the MT-Framework 2.0, an updated version of the engine used in several Capcom-developed games. A support for the campaign mode can have up to 4 players working together via the internet.

=== Plot ===
The first Lost Planet begins in the year of the game T.C. -80 where the Earth has become too hostile for human life. A company named NEVEC (Neo-Venus Construction) tries to start colonization on the planet E.D.N. III. Upon arriving on the planet, NEVEC discovers an alien race called Akrid and are forced off the planet, momentarily stopping colonization efforts. Returning to E.D.N. III with an army prepared to fight, they find that the Akrid can only function because their bodies contain reserves of thermal energy (T-ENG), humans must also carry supplies of thermal energy to survive on E.D.N. III. NEVEC builds the first Vital Suit (VS), a mecha powered by T-ENG, to fight the Akrid. Meanwhile, civilian colonists and bands of E.D.N. III military personnel continue to seek out a nomadic existence as "snow pirates", harvesting T-ENG from fallen Akrid.

The story of the sequel takes place back on E.D.N. III, 10 years after the events of the first game. The snow has melted to reveal jungles and more tropical areas that have taken the place of more frozen regions. The game centers on a civil war to gain T-ENG. Player(s) can assume control of several different groups of soldiers, called Snow Pirates, and battle the Akrid. The Akrid have expanded their armies and return much more powerful in Lost Planet 2.

Lost Planet 3 is a prequel to the first two games in the series, following the story of Jim Peyton on E.D.N. III.

== Reception ==
Aggregate and Famitsū review scores As of March 20, 2016.
Game	Famitsu	Metacritic
Lost Planet: Extreme Condition	X360: 36/40	X360: 79; PC: 66; PS3: 67
Lost Planet: Extreme Condition Colonies Edition	-	X360: 79; PC: 63
Lost Planet 2	X360: 33/40; PS3: 33/40	PS3: 68; X360: 68; PC: 63
E.X. Troopers	3DS: 34/40; PS3: 32/40	-
Lost Planet 3	X360: 33/40; PS3: 33/40	PC: 61; X360: 58; PS3: 61

== Film adaptation ==
In July 2008, David Hayter (voice of Solid/Naked Snake in the video game series Metal Gear Solid and screenwriter of films such as X-Men, X2: X-Men United and Watchmen) was in talks with Warner Bros. to write and direct a film adaptation of Lost Planet. On July 15, at the 2008 E3 Expo, Capcom announced their partnership with Warner Brothers to make the film based on this game. Father and son producing team Avi and Ari Arad (The Incredible Hulk and Iron Man) also having been tapped to work on the project, and although no cast have yet been signed on, the film was initially set for release sometime in 2013.

In 2010, Hayter told MTV that he penned a few drafts of the screenplay adaptation of the Capcom game, but he declared that they "had some internal issues between a couple of the companies, which I think has caused a delay there", indicating that the project had stalled.

In 2014, Hayter revealed that plans for the film simply faded after the studio hit a "financial crash" around the time he submitted his draft.
