= Turning Point: Fall of Liberty =

2008 video game

- European box art
- Developer: Spark Unlimited
- Publisher: Codemasters
- Composer: Michael Giacchino
- Engine: Unreal Engine 3
- Platforms: Microsoft Windows, PlayStation 3, Xbox 360
- Release: NA: February 26, 2008; EU: March 14, 2008; AU: March 21, 2008
- Genre: First-person shooter
- Modes: Single-player, Multiplayer

Turning Point: Fall of Liberty is a 2008 alternate history first-person shooter video game developed by Spark Unlimited and published by Codemasters for the PlayStation 3, Xbox 360 and Microsoft Windows. It was released in 2008 in North America on February 26, in Europe on March 14; and in Australia on March 21.

The game is set in an alternate history in which Winston Churchill dies in 1931, eight years before the start of World War II, presenting the possibility of what could have happened without his leadership; the United Kingdom is subdued by Nazi Germany in 1940, and the rest of Europe, North Africa and the Middle East fall soon afterward. The United States, infected with anti-war sentiment, does not get involved overseas, allowing German power to grow unabated. The game takes place in the midst of the Greater German Reich's invasion and occupation of the East Coast of the United States in 1953.

== Gameplay ==
An in-game screenshot of combat in New York City, near the destroyed Chrysler Building.

In Turning Point: Fall of Liberty, the player assumes the role of Dan Carson, an average New York construction worker who has no prior connection to the military. Unlike other similar war games, the player's objective is not to help the Allies win the war, but merely to survive in an environment of total war as a resistance fighter against Nazi Germany.

The game includes many advanced versions of weapons used in World War II, and several that were being researched and developed late in the war but never made it to mass production. Super-heavy tanks such as the E-100 and Landkreuzer P. 1000 Ratte appear in the game, as well as the Nachteule troop-transport zeppelin, the Flugzeugträger German aircraft carrier Graf Zeppelin, and various advanced jet fighters and bombers, all of which are utilized by the German invasion force.

The player can wield up to two weapons, which can be German or American. Weapons range from submachine guns to rifles to rocket launchers. He can also wield up to four grenades. When the player gets close to a Nazi soldier, a prompt comes up. Pressing the melee button when the prompt is seen allows two options to be taken. One is an instant kill, where Carson melees the Nazi soldier to death. The other is the human shield, where Carson knocks the Nazi soldier out, holds him in a stranglehold, and takes his sidearm. He can walk around killing other Nazi soldiers with the human shield protecting him against most damage until his human shield dies. Occasionally, a Nazi soldier will be standing near an interactive object, such as a furnace or a toilet, allowing Carson to perform an environmental kill with it.

=== Multiplayer ===
Multiplayer in Turning Point: Fall of Liberty was available online via Xbox Live, PlayStation Network or through a System Link although there are currently no servers available for Xbox Live. Gameplay is divided into two modes: deathmatch and team deathmatch with players able to play as Nazi soldiers or as the American Resistance. The players can pick their primary weapon (a pistol serves as the secondary weapon). Gameplay is centered on four maps based on locations within the game and each map also has its own player limit with eight as the maximum.

== Campaign ==
=== Setting ===
Turning Point: Fall of Liberty is based on an alternate history by Stephen R. Pastore where the point of divergence occurs with Winston Churchill's death in 1931 from being struck by a taxi while visiting New York City, instead of surviving. Nine years later, without his foresight and leadership, Nazi Germany defeats the United Kingdom by crushing the Royal Air Force during the Blitz and launching Operation Sea Lion, forcing Prime Minister Neville Chamberlain to surrender. This major victory, alongside the United States maintaining its isolationist stance under President Thomas E. Dewey, allows Germany to sweep through the rest of Europe virtually unopposed, before launching Operation Barbarossa and attacking the Soviet Union. With no other fronts to hamper them and no allies supporting the Soviet war effort, the Wehrmacht routs the disorganized Red Army, occupies Stalingrad, Leningrad, and Moscow, and ultimately forces Joseph Stalin to surrender as well. Germany and the Kingdom of Italy invade North Africa, creating Benito Mussolini's "New Roman Empire", while the Empire of Japan sweeps through East Asia unopposed using Germany's captured Middle Eastern and Soviet oil to nullify the impact of the ABCD Encirclement, rendering the attack on Pearl Harbor unnecessary and thus preventing American entry into the war. Resistance movements and even peaceful demonstrations in the occupied territories are violently crushed.

With the Axis powers victorious, Germany begins transforming conquered Europe, Asia, and Africa into the Greater Germanic Reich alongside Italy and Japan. However, continued military build-ups and Wunderwaffe programs developing fighter jets, strategic bombers, super-heavy tanks, and the atomic bomb, all occurring despite the war having concluded, draw suspicion. The U.S. and the few other free countries in the League of Nations condemn the Axis build-up and repression in the occupied territories, but do nothing to act due to Axis technological dominance and strong anti-war sentiments. In 1951, the British Resistance uncovers "Operation Humpback Whale", a secret plan for an invasion of the U.S.; however, when Germany and Japan deny the allegations, President Dewey believes them and makes no effort to prepare for a possible invasion.

=== Plot ===
On September 22, 1953, Germany launches a surprise invasion of the Eastern Seaboard, rapidly overrunning major cities such as Boston and Philadelphia. In New York City, construction worker Dan Carson survives the attack and links up with a New York Army National Guard unit conducting a fighting retreat out of the city. After the Germans seize Washington, D.C., Propaganda Minister Joseph Goebbels announces that President Dewey and Vice President Haley will be "resigning", allowing the Nazi-supported Speaker of the House James Edward Stevenson to lead the new puppet government. President Stevenson's first act in office is ordering the United States Armed Forces to stand down, effectively surrendering to Germany.

Despite the official surrender, many elements of the U.S. military and regular Americans alike, including Carson, continue to fight the occupation, forming the American Resistance. General George Donnelly, in defiance of President Stevenson's orders, leads a raid against the Federal Courthouse, where Goebbels was stationed, but he is captured and charged with treason. Carson and the Resistance raid the Nazi prison where Donnelly is held and rescue him. With Donnelly assuming command, the Resistance launches a full assault on the heavily-fortified White House to assassinate President Stevenson, clear the Nazi presence from the area, and demolish the White House, which all succeed, decapitating the American puppet government. During the attack, the Resistance discovers secret documents that detail the existence of a secret lab that developed the atomic bomb under the Tower of London and reveal one will be tested on New York City. The Resistance decides to travel to occupied Britain to end the atomic threat.

In London, a Resistance plane airdrops Carson on the White Tower, using an attack on the Houses of Parliament as a distraction. Carson locates and destroys two heavily-guarded atomic bombs, but a British scientist informs him that the last bomb is being loaded onto a Zeppelin bound for New York City. Carson sneaks aboard the Zeppelin while it is docked over the Tower Bridge for repairs and fights his way through, but the bomb's controls are damaged from the firefight, leaving Carson unable to simply jettison the bomb. With time running out and the Zeppelin still bound for New York City, Carson rewires the bomb to self-destruct. The resulting detonation destroys the Zeppelin and kills all on board, including Carson, but saves New York City. With the Nazi war machine set back immensely, the Resistance swells as people across the U.S. and the world are inspired to fight back against the Axis regimes.

== Marketing ==
=== Demo ===
A basic demo was released on the Xbox Live Marketplace on January 25, 2008, but no demo was released on the PlayStation Store. The demo showcased the initial level of the game and also demonstrated some gameplay features such as grappling and using enemies as human shields. The demo received negative feedback from gaming websites who criticized several disappointing aspects of the gameplay such as viewing sensitivity, problems with the AI, and graphics issues. The game's developers at Spark stated that the game should not be judged by the demo, and that they had corrected several of the issues many people had with it.

=== Collector's edition and exclusives ===
A collector's edition of Turning Point: Fall of Liberty was made available for the Xbox 360 only. This edition includes a soundtrack and concept art book for the game. Those who reserved any version of the game before its release received a "Join the Resistance" pre-order gift pack containing a behind-the-scenes DVD, postcards featuring scenes from the game, and a timeline poster detailing the events leading up to the story. Video game retailer GameStop also offered two exclusive items with a reservation of the game: an 8" by 11" lithograph print depicting the assault on New York City and a game code to unlock infinite ammo during gameplay.

== Reception ==
Reception

Aggregate score
Aggregator	Score		
Aggregator	PC	PS3	Xbox 360
Metacritic	39/100	42/100	43/100

Review scores
Publication	Score		
Publication	PC	PS3	Xbox 360
Edge	N/A	N/A	3/10
Eurogamer	N/A	N/A	3/10
Game Informer	3/10	3/10	3/10
GameRevolution	N/A	N/A	D
GameSpot	N/A	4.5/10	4.5/10
GameSpy	1.5/5	1.5/5	1.5/5
IGN	5/10	5/10	5/10
Official Xbox Magazine (US)	N/A	N/A	6.5/10
PC Gamer (US)	40%	N/A	N/A
PC PowerPlay	5/10	N/A	N/A
PlayStation: The Official Magazine	N/A	2/5	N/A

Turning Point: Fall of Liberty received "generally unfavorable reviews" on all platforms according to the review aggregation website Metacritic. IGN noted the unique concept for the game's plot, but criticized the quality of the gaming experience as "archaic". Other criticisms included a flat, linear storyline that provided little characterization, a lackluster and unamusing multiplayer mode, and frustratingly uncooperative gameplay actions such as climbing ladders. The musical score was better received, being described as a solid and well-made part of the game. Overall, the game was considered a "shining example of a great idea poorly executed".

1UP.com gave the Xbox 360 version a slightly higher rating, but identified the game's worst shortcoming as allowing "the potential narrative (to take) a backseat for most of the adventure". While most criticism was aimed at the underdevelopment of the plot, the review also commented on problems with repetitive objectives and control inconsistencies. In the conclusion, the review stated that "every time Turning Point does something well, it falls short somewhere else". On a more positive note, the game was called "a more than competent deviation for someone itching to kill more Nazis", mainly due to the intriguing story.

In response to the poor reception of the game by reviewers, the developers of Turning Point: Fall of Liberty have said that their game was not intended for hardcore gamers, but rather a more casual audience. They claim that reviewers are "too hard" on casual games, explaining the low scores that several games, including Turning Point, have received over the weeks following its release.

== See also ==
- Alternate history
- Counterfactual history
- What If? (essays)
- Edward F. Cantasano
- Hypothetical Axis victory in World War II
- Wolfenstein: The New Order
