= Spark Unlimited =

American video game developer

- Company type: Privately held company
- Industry: Video games
- Founded: March 2002
- Defunct: May 2015
- Headquarters: Sherman Oaks, Los Angeles, California, U.S.
- Key people: Craig Allen; Avi Bachar; John Butrovich; David Prout
- Products: Call of Duty: Finest Hour; Turning Point: Fall of Liberty; Legendary
- Website: sparkunlimited.com

Spark Unlimited, based in Sherman Oaks, Los Angeles, was a video game developer founded by former developers from the Medal of Honor video game franchise. The studio's first game was Call of Duty: Finest Hour in 2004. Its last game was Yaiba: Ninja Gaiden Z in 2014. The company shut down in May 2015.

== History ==
Spark Unlimited was established by a team of 28 developers who had previously worked on the Medal of Honor series. It signed with Activision to work on a Call of Duty game in December 2003.

In 2005, Spark filed a lawsuit against Activision and accused the company of trying to "kill off" Spark. Activision counter-sued for fraud.

In 2005, Spark announced a deal to develop several games for ad network Massive.

== Games ==
Title	Year	Platform(s)	Publisher(s)
Call of Duty: Finest Hour	2004	PlayStation 2 Xbox; GameCube	Activision
Turning Point: Fall of Liberty	2008	PlayStation 3 Xbox 360; Windows	Codemasters
Legendary	2008	PlayStation 3 Xbox 360; Windows	Gamecock Media Group, Atari Europe
Lost Planet 3	2013	PlayStation 3 Xbox 360; Windows	Capcom
Yaiba: Ninja Gaiden Z	2014	PlayStation 3 Xbox 360; Windows	Koei Tecmo
