= Lost Planet 2 =

2010 third-person shooter video game

- Developers: Capcom (PS3/Xbox 360/Windows); Beeline Interactive, Inc. (BlackBerry)
- Publisher: Capcom
- Director: Kenji Oguro
- Producer: Jun Takeuchi
- Artist: Takahiro Kawano
- Writer: Tomoyuki Hosokawa
- Composers: Marika Suzuki; Akiyuki Morimoto; Jamie Christopherson
- Series: Lost Planet
- Engine: MT Framework
- Platforms: BlackBerry, PlayStation 3, Xbox 360, Microsoft Windows
- Release: BlackBerry: WW: April 28, 2010; PlayStation 3, Xbox 360: NA/EU: May 11, 2010; AU: May 13, 2010; JP: May 20, 2010; Microsoft Windows: NA: October 12, 2010; JP: October 14, 2010; NA: October 15, 2010 (Steam); EU: October 15, 2010
- Genre: Third-person shooter
- Modes: Single-player, multiplayer

Lost Planet 2 (ロスト プラネット 2, Rosuto Puranetto Tsu) is a third-person shooter video game developed and published by Capcom for PlayStation 3, Xbox 360 and Microsoft Windows, and by Beeline Interactive, Inc. for BlackBerry. It is the sequel to Lost Planet: Extreme Condition, taking place ten years after the events of the first game, on the same planet. Originally set to be released in early 2010, Capcom delayed the game's console release to May 11, 2010, in North America and Europe, May 13 in Australia and May 20 for Japan, while the BlackBerry version was released worldwide on April 28 and the Microsoft Windows version was released in October that year. The title sold more than 1.5 million copies worldwide.

Additionally, the game can be purchased from the Xbox digital store and played on Xbox One and Xbox Series consoles through the Xbox backwards compatibility program.

On November 9, 2021, the Steam version of Lost Planet 2 was pulled from sale due to some underlying issues with the game's Games for Windows – Live features. Capcom stated that is "investigating the matter further", but has not given any updates on the matter since.

== Gameplay ==
Multiplayer gameplay from Lost Planet 2

Many gameplay features from the original Lost Planet game are present. Recurring elements include major boss battles, extreme terrain, and the ability to pilot mechanized armor suits, known as Vital Suits (VSs). On July 24, 2009, producer Jun Takeuchi held a Q&A session for fans at San Diego Comic-Con, in which he revealed that there would be a lot more co-op based VSs. Players will be able to ride on the sides of some VSs. These VSs can be controlled by one player, while two others hang on by the sides and shoot. Takeuchi also revealed that there would be flying VSs which feature unlimited flying time.

Unlike Lost Planet, Lost Planet 2 will not constantly drain players of thermal energy. This is due to the warmer climate, which can sustain T-ENG presence longer than a cold climate, which drains thermal energy over time. Instead, energy can only be drained when the player pilots a VS and uses a weapon that requires energy. However, thermal energy is still constantly lost unless a specific ability is equipped despite the 'warmer climate'. The character may also lose thermal energy by completing one entire sprint with a character (confirmed in the demo). If one player loses all of their energy, another can give them some of their energy, using a new weapon, to keep players alive.

Kenji Oguro and Jun Takeuchi announced that the game would reward players with experience points. Players will earn more points for playing in a unique manner and completing extra objectives in missions. Once the game has been beaten on any difficulty, players are allowed to use this character for the campaign. These points can then be used to unlock costumes and attachments for the player to customize their Pirate.

=== Online versus ===
Lost Planet 2 borrowed the online multiplayer versus modes of its predecessor, and featured new modes as well. Versus characters can also be modified in far greater depth than in the original game, customising not only skins but a wide selection of skins for legs, the face and torso.

== Plot ==
One decade on from the events of the first game, the climate of E.D.N. III has undergone drastic changes that have produced radically different biomes across the planet. These new circumstances have not stalled the ongoing conflict between various human factions to gain control of the planet's supply of Thermal Energy (T-ENG), whilst the indigenous Akrid creatures have begun to metamorphosise into new, unexpected forms. The most dangerous of these are colossal Akrid, classified as "Category G", that contain immense amounts of T-ENG and can alter the landscape of the environment by virtue of simply existing.

The story is divided into episodes. Episodes shift focus between the various factions – each with their own objectives, technology, and methods – as they take steps to ensure their continued survival and vie for supremacy. In addition to the Snow Pirates from the first game, playable factions featured in Lost Planet 2 include New NEVEC (a colonial military force), Ex-NEVEC (defectors from the former), Waysiders (mountain-based survivalists) and Vagabundos (roving packs of desert bandits). Other factions, such as the industrious Carpetbaggers, are also encountered and fought.

=== Episode 1: Return to E.D.N. III ===
The Mercenaries ambush a group of injured Ex-NEVEC soldiers when they are suddenly attacked by a Chryatis Akrid, but they are able to defeat it. They procure stolen VSs (Vital Suits) but they run out of fuel, so they continue to their rendezvous point on foot until they are attacked by another Chryatis. After defeating it, the chopper arrives at the rendezvous point and the scene changes from a frozen wasteland to a scenic heavily forested Amuraba Jungle. Their mission is to destroy the mining site operated by the Jungle Pirates, which they are met with difficulty. After defeating the Cat-G (Category G) Queen Akrid, they fend off the rest of the Jungle Pirate army when they receive a message from a concerned dispatcher telling them about a new rendezvous point.

The new point turns out to be a lair for the Cat-G Gordiant Akrid. After defeating Gordiant, a passerby Mercenary chopper retrieves the team and informs them that the whole mission was a setup and that all teams sent to destroy the mine were wiped out. The side effects of Gordiant's death triggers a sharp decline in temperature as the team leaves the lair.

=== Episode 2: Harbingers of NEVEC ===
A New NEVEC Black Ops team known as 'Task Force First Descent' are sent to infiltrate Central City to seize an experimental superweapon developed by the Carpetbaggers. The team fights their way to through the warehouse and into Central City where they learn that the superweapon is a large cannon on a train dubbed the Railway Gun. The Railway Gun is about to depart the city until Cat-G Akrid X unexpectedly arrives from outer space to intercept the departure.

The Railway Gun wounds Akrid X and escapes Central City, leaving Task Force First Descent to finish off Akrid X who rejuvenates a makeshift head through T-ENG (Thermal ENerGy). The team defeats Akrid X and New NEVEC reinforcements arrive, with the Commander briefing the team of activity from another Cat-G, which is later revealed to be the Over-G. On their way to their next mission, it is then revealed that the members of Task Force First Descent are clones of Ivan Solotov, the man who betrayed NEVEC in the first game.

=== Episode 3: Libera Me ===
After successfully stealing T-ENG but losing half of their team members, a group of Waysiders are en route to an undisclosed location via train when they are suddenly attacked by the Cat-G Redeye. They temporarily fend off Redeye by detaching the excess train cars and with the remaining T-ENG, they escape with the chopper VSs. Running out of fuel, they land but are ambushed by the Sandraiders in the desert colony. After defeating them, the Waysiders are then ambushed by two Debouse Akrids, but they are taken care of.

Escaping by another train, they encounter the escaped Railway Gun from the previous episode and take over. They are then confronted again by Redeye and using the Railway Gun, the Waysiders kill Redeye. The team are looking forward to go home afterwards, but the Over-G's activities have made home a snowstorm. Angrily accepting a new challenge, the Waysiders set a course for the Over-G.

=== Episode 4: Counterstrike ===
After reading the activity reports from Redeye and the Over-G, Ex-NEVEC forces meet outside an ocean New NEVEC warehouse and devises a plan to stop the Over-G. The plan is to infiltrate the warehouse and sneak onto a shuttle that is set to fly to the NEOS space station. From there, they will use the Orbital Cannon to put an end to the Over-G. First the team that was captured by the Carpetbaggers are freed, then they infiltrate the warehouse, destroy the New NEVEC experimental weapon "VF" underwater, and sneak onto pods that are to be loaded into the shuttle.

=== Episode 5: Treasure Borrachos ===
A group of Vagabundos hijack New NEVEC's Overland Battleship (seen in Episode 4) and kill all on board. While messing around with the uptop T-ENG cannon, the Cat-G Akrid Baiztencale attacks the ship, but is killed quickly. The Vagabundos decide to detach half the ship, which in turn gets rid of the Cat-G's corpse. New NEVEC sends out another Overland Battleship with another T-ENG cannon to seize the Vagabundo-ran ship, but the Vagabundos destroy their cannon, ship wings, and force NEVEC's ship to self-destruct. After seeing the shuttle to NEOS launch and reading T-ENG energy that is off the charts, the Vagabundos celebrate and happily set a course to the Over-G.

=== Episode 6: Meltdown ===
The Ex-NEVEC team sent to space successfully make it to the NEOS space station. In addition to the Orbital Cannon, they discover advanced VSs that have GPS integration and advanced melee combat. With "some connections in NEVEC", Ex-NEVEC's commander ensures that the team can trust Task Force First Descent as they arrive to assist with Ex-NEVEC's plan. While the Ex-NEVEC team escapes with the GPSs via the VSs, Task Force First Descent stays behind to operate the Orbital Cannon. En route back to E.D.N. III's surface, the Ex-NEVEC commander broadcasts a message through NEOS to all factions on the planet, calling for a planet-wide alliance to come together and take down the Over-G.

On arrival in E.D.N. III, the team is attacked by all kinds of Akrid and are then ambushed by multiple Undeep Cat-G Akrids. With help from the Waysiders' Railway Gun, the Vagabundos' Battleship, and from people of all the other factions, the Ex-NEVEC team fights their way to the Over-G's lair and plants the GPSs on it. Task Force First Descent fires the cannon but the Over-G survives and comes back stronger.

In a last ditch effort, Task Force First Descent sends NEOS with the Orbital Cannon to physically strike the Over-G; killing it, sacrificing themselves and destroying NEOS in the process. All the factions come together to help each other watch the sun rise, as some sections of NEOS' destruction have impacted the surface, including the T-ENG enriched-ocean. A lone Trillid Akrid is seen flying towards the sun alongside a Chopper VS, but it appears colorful, pure, and it does not harm the people on board. All factions now are at peace with each other, working together to live to fight another day.

== Development ==
Lost Planet 2 runs on the MT Framework 2.0, an updated version of the engine used in the original Lost Planet. A support for the campaign mode can have up to four players working together via the internet.

Unlike its predecessor, Lost Planet 2 allows players to create and customize their own characters and allows them to unlock more clothing and body types after leveling up and downloading content. The game also allows players to edit weapon models, and color palettes used. However, weapons used in multi-player have to be unlocked through leveling up. Players can take content that they have unlocked in the campaign and take that onto multiplayer versus (and vice versa). In February 2010 the Xbox 360 version of the game was rumored to have significant cuts in order to make the game fit on a single DVD and the content cut to be available as downloadable content but no confirmation has been given if this content was to be charged for or free. These claims were later to be deemed as a mistranslation. In an interview with the game's producer, he claimed that there was no content cut from the Xbox 360 version.

=== Marketing and promotion ===
Gameplay from the announcement trailer of Lost Planet 2

Lost Planet 2 was announced on February 8, 2009, via a trailer on Xbox Live. In mid-April 2009, a video was released by Eurogamer with a boss battle being depicted in real-time gameplay. The video showed thermal energy usage, VSs, and deployable health fields. At E3 2009, Capcom offered a preview of Lost Planet 2's co-op campaign, and announced a Winter 2009 release date. On June 29, 2009, at Microsoft's Midnight Live 360 show, Capcom announced a Lost Planet 2 demo that is available via Xbox Live Marketplace.

On July 19, 2009, Capcom announced that Lost Planet 2 would be playable at Comic-Con 2009. The Capcom Unity Blog reported that visitors would be able to try the four-player campaign mission against the giant salamander boss. At the event, Capcom also held a raffle to give away a number of 16-inch plush toys and a single 3-foot-long plush toy of the salamander boss.

On August 19, 2009, a four-player co-op demo of Lost Planet 2 was released onto Xbox Live Marketplace. On September 24, 2009, a demo was released through PlayStation Network PlayStation Store, which features two new levels. This demo also features full game launching support for up to four players for PlayStation Home, the PlayStation 3's online community-based service. Game launching lets users set up multiplayer games in Home and launch directly into the game from Home.

On December 22, it was announced that Capcom would delay Lost Planet 2, along with three other games, to avoid competition in the early half of 2010.

On January 26, Capcom announced during an announcement for Monster Hunter Frontier that Lost Planet 2 would be released on May 18 in North America and Europe and May 20 in Japan. Also announced was the addition of two characters, Marcus Fenix and Dominic Santiago from the Gears of War series for the Xbox 360. Capcom also confirmed that Albert Wesker from Resident Evil would be in the game.

A character model from the Monster Hunter franchise was announced by Joystiq to be PlayStation 3 exclusive. Frank West from Dead Rising is also featured in the game.

To create a buzz around the launch of Lost Planet 2, Capcom conducted an experiential marketing campaign at The Arches in London Bridge, two months ahead of its UK launch. People were invited to be the first to play Lost Planet 2 at a venue dressed with sand bags, military paraphernalia and oil drums to reflect the atmosphere of the game.

On March 26, Capcom announced that a new multiplayer demo for Lost Planet 2 would be coming to Xbox Live and the PlayStation Network. Early access would be distributed via voucher codes within the company's community, while public access would be made available on April 21 for Xbox Live and April 22 for PSN.

In addition, if the Lost Planet 2 multiplayer demo reached one million downloads by midnight Pacific Time on May 5, Capcom would donate $50,000 to Music for Relief, a charity founded by Linkin Park members to provide aid to victims of natural disasters. Plus, members of the Lost Planet community had the opportunity to win a seat in a celebrity tournament to be held at the game's May 6 pre-release party in Los Angeles.

On May 14, PlayStation Blog announced that PlayStation 3 owners would also be able to download two skins of the Helghast characters from the Killzone franchise, in addition to the Rathalos armor from Monster Hunter.

A benchmark for the Windows PC version was released on August 16, 2010, and Capcom announced that the PC version would include several DirectX 11 effects and support for the Nvidia 3D Vision and Nvidia 3D Vision Surround setups to deliver a stereoscopic image. In an interview, producer Jun Takeuchi stated that the PC version features higher resolution textures and several DirectX 11 effects such as subdivision surface, displacement mapping, softbody, interactive fluid surfaces and high-quality shadow filtering.

=== Downloadable content ===
In June, there was a release of downloadable content for Lost Planet 2 for the PlayStation 3. Two Helghast costumes are available to use in multiplayer and single-player modes. The DLC is completely free of charge. There is also a map pack that was released pre-game release (noted from Xbox Marketplace and PlayStation Network). A map pack was released on June 1, 2010, for the PlayStation 3 and June 2, 2010, for the Xbox Marketplace. Map Pack 2 has two more maps for multiplayer. The first is called Dockyard Battle and takes place in the overland battleship from Episode 5 of the campaign. The second, Frozen Wasteland, is a remake of a map from Lost Planet: Extreme Condition. A third added a "Boss Rush" mode and the "Post Modern" skin.

== Reception ==
Reception

Aggregate score
| Aggregator | Score | | |
| Aggregator | PC | PS3 | Xbox 360 |
|---|---|---|---|
| Metacritic | 63/100 | 68/100 | 68/100 |

Review scores
| Publication | Score | | |
| Publication | PC | PS3 | Xbox 360 |
|---|---|---|---|
| Destructoid | N/A | N/A | 4/10 |
| Eurogamer | N/A | 6/10 | N/A |
| Game Informer | N/A | 8.5/10 | 8.5/10 |
| GamePro | N/A | N/A | 3/5 |
| GameRevolution | N/A | B− | B− |
| GameSpot | 7/10 | 5.5/10 | 5.5/10 |
| GameTrailers | N/A | N/A | 7.2/10 |
| GameZone | 5/10 | 8/10 | 8/10 |
| Giant Bomb | N/A | N/A | 2/5 |
| IGN | 6/10 | (UK) 6.8/10 (US) 5.5/10 | (UK) 6.8/10 (US) 6/10 |
| Joystiq | N/A | N/A | 2.5/5 |
| Official Xbox Magazine (US) | N/A | N/A | 8/10 |
| PC Gamer (UK) | 59% | N/A | N/A |
| PlayStation: The Official Magazine | N/A | 3/5 | N/A |
| The Daily Telegraph | N/A | N/A | 8/10 |
| The Escapist | N/A | N/A | 3/5 |

Lost Planet 2 received "mixed or average reviews" on all platforms, according to the review aggregation website Metacritic.

GamePro said of the Xbox 360 version that "Lost Planet 2 features an enjoyable multiplayer component and interesting monster designs, but it isn't enough to overcome its many faults. Gamers who enjoyed playing the original title online will find reasons to play it, but it's a disappointing title that doesn't live up to its potential". GameSpot took a similar view on the frustrations of the PlayStation 3 and Xbox 360 versions, stating: "This sci-fi sequel seems like it should have everything you need in a shooter, but a shocking number of design missteps suck out much of the fun". They later released a second review for the PC release. The review explains the differences and tweaks made to make the game more tolerable and much more graphically advanced than the console installment. IGN said of the PC version: "If you've burned through other multiplayer or co-op options, then there might be something for you in Lost Planet 2. The single-player campaign is lengthy at around 14 hours with full co-op support and the multiplayer has plenty of maps and modes. Just do yourself a favor: buy some insurance for the controller you'll invariably throw across the room at one of Lost Planet 2's seemingly endless design and interface issues". In Japan, Famitsu gave the PS3 and Xbox 360 versions each a score of two eights, one nine, and one eight for a total of 33 out of 40.

The Daily Telegraph gave the Xbox 360 version a score of eight out of ten and said, "following on from co-op leviathans like Left 4 Dead and Gears of War, Lost Planet 2 is certainly standing on the shoulders of giants. It's not quite pumping lead into their glowing orange weak spots, but it's not far off the mark". The Escapist gave it three out of five and said, "the guns and bugs make for some spectacular fireworks, but, after the sparks settle, you are left wishing you had played something a little more substantial". Edge similarly gave it a score of six out of ten and said, "at its best it's an engaging spectacle, but when it falters Lost Planet 2 is a gamble that doesn't pay off". 411Mania gave the PS3 and Xbox 360 versions a score of 5.5 out of 10 and called it "a disappointing sequel that is inferior to the original. The controls are poor and confusing, the story is not interesting, and the artificial intelligence is far from intelligent. Outside of the beautiful landscape that you will explore, there's little to enjoy as you battle the Akrid for T-ENG. The only redeeming quality this game has is the multiplayer experience, but there are far better options out there and you'll quickly grow tired of it too, even with all of the customization available". The A.V. Club gave the Xbox 360 version a D− and said it was just "another deposit of digital cholesterol on a constricting artery that's one cheeseburger away from being clogged forever by uninspired third-person shooters".
