= Capcom =

Japanese video game company

Capcom Co., Ltd.
- Logo used since 1989

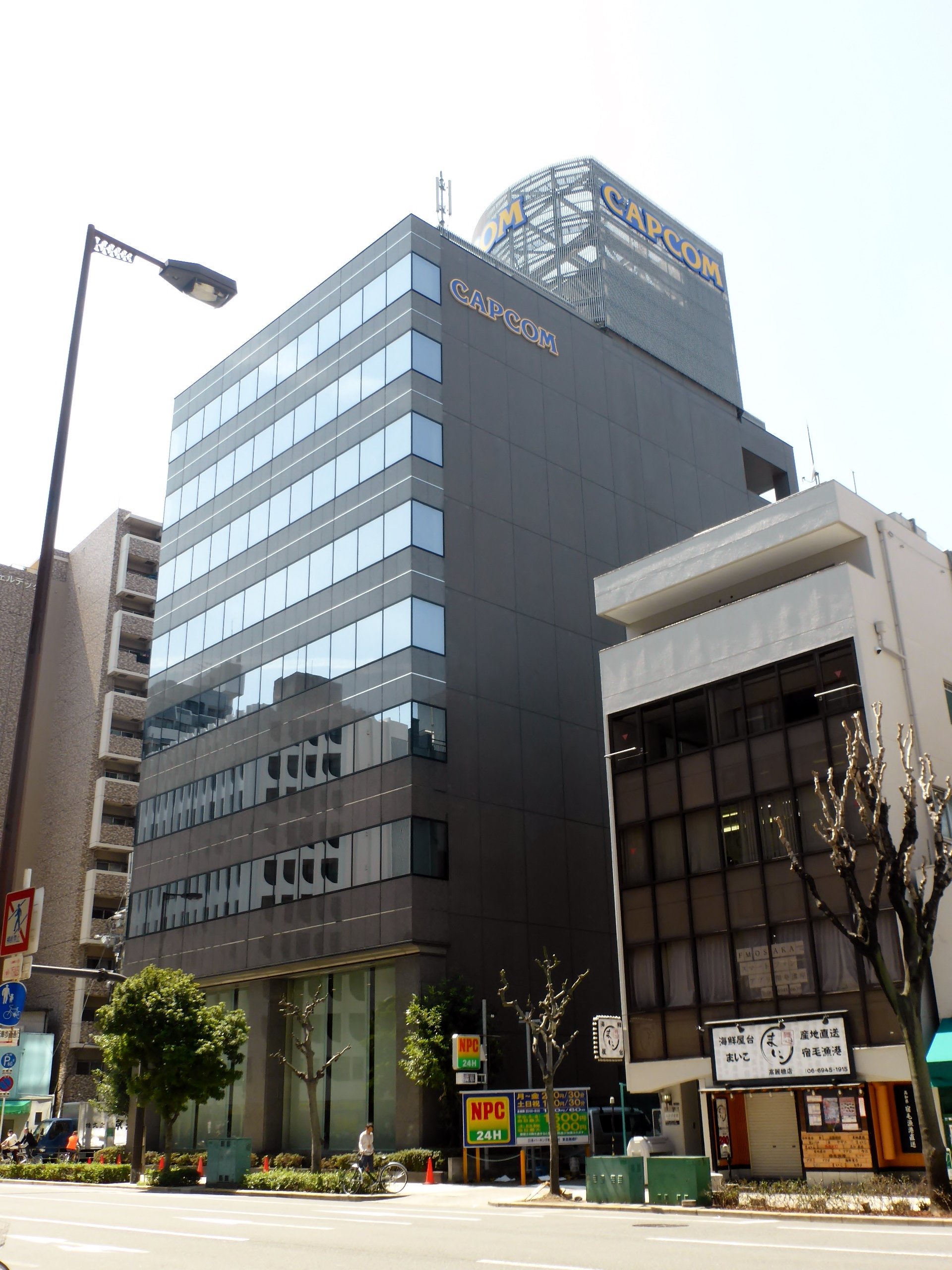
- Headquarters in Chūō-ku, Osaka
- Native name: 株式会社カプコン
- Romanized name: Kabushiki-gaisha Kapukon
- Type: Public
- Traded as: TYO: 9697
- ISIN: JP3218900003
- Industry: Video games
- Predecessor: I.R.M. Corporation
- Founded: June 11, 1983; 43 years ago
- Founder: Kenzo Tsujimoto
- Headquarters: Uchihiranomachi, Chūō-ku, Osaka, Japan
- Key people: Kenzo Tsujimoto (chairman and CEO); Haruhiro Tsujimoto (president and COO)
- Products: Complete list of games
- Revenue: ▲¥169.6 billion (2024)
- Operating income: ▲¥65.7 billion (2024)
- Net income: ▲¥48.4 billion (2024)
- Total assets: ▲¥312.982 billion (2024)
- Total equity: ▲¥226.303 billion (2024)
- Owner: Tsujimoto family (22.71%)
- Number of employees: 3,766 (2025)
- Parent: Sanbi Co., Ltd (1983–1989)
- Divisions: Development Division 1–2
- Subsidiaries: See § Branches and subsidiaries
- Website: www.capcom.co.jp; www.capcom.co.jp/ir/english

Capcom Co., Ltd. (Japanese: 株式会社カプコン, Hepburn: Kabushiki-gaisha Kapukon) is a Japanese video game company based in Osaka. It has created a number of critically acclaimed and multi-million-selling game franchises, with its most commercially successful being Resident Evil, Monster Hunter, Street Fighter, Mega Man, Devil May Cry, Dead Rising, Ace Attorney, Dragon's Dogma, and Marvel vs. Capcom. Established in 1983, it has become an international enterprise with subsidiaries in East Asia (Hong Kong), Europe (London, England), and North America (San Francisco, California).

== History ==
=== 1979–1984: Founding and arcade games ===
Capcom's predecessor, I.R.M. Corporation, was founded on May 30, 1979 by Kenzo Tsujimoto, who was still president of Irem Corporation when he founded I.R.M. He worked at both companies at the same time until leaving Irem in 1983.

The original companies that spawned Capcom's Japan branch were I.R.M. and its subsidiary Japan Capsule Computers Co., Ltd., both of which were devoted to the manufacture and distribution of electronic game machines. The two companies underwent a name change to Sanbi Co., Ltd. in September 1981. On June 11, 1983, Tsujimoto established Capcom Co., Ltd. to take over the internal sales department.

In January 1989, Capcom Co., Ltd. merged with Sanbi Co., Ltd., resulting in the current Japan branch. The name Capcom is a clipped compound of "Capsule Computers", a term coined by the company for the arcade machines it solely manufactured in its early years, designed to set themselves apart from personal computers that were becoming widespread. "Capsule" alludes to how Capcom likened its game software to "a capsule packed to the brim with gaming fun", and to the company's desire to protect its intellectual property with a hard outer shell, preventing illegal copies and inferior imitations.

Capcom's first product was the medal game Little League (July 1983) followed by Fever Chance (Oct 1983). In December 1983, the video arcade Acty 24 was opened under the direct management of Capcom. It released its first arcade video game, Vulgus (May 1984). Starting with the arcade hit 1942 (1984), they began designing games with international markets in mind. The successful 1985 arcade games Commando and Ghosts 'n Goblins have been credited as the products "that shot [Capcom] to 8-bit silicon stardom" in the mid-1980s. Starting with Commando (late 1985), Capcom began licensing its arcade games for release on home computers, notably to British software houses Elite Systems and U.S. Gold in the late 1980s.

=== 1985–1999: Console game development ===
Beginning with a Nintendo Entertainment System port of 1942 (published in Dec. 1985), the company ventured into the market of home console video games, which would eventually become its main business. The Capcom USA division had a brief stint in the late 1980s as a video game publisher for Commodore 64 and IBM PC DOS computers, development of these arcade ports was handled by other companies, however. Capcom created home video game franchises, including Resident Evil in 1996, while its highest-grossing title is the fighting game Street Fighter II (1991), driven largely by its success in arcades.

In the late 1980s, Capcom was on the verge of bankruptcy when the development of a strip Mahjong game called Mahjong Gakuen started. It outsold Ghouls 'n Ghosts, the eighth highest-grossing arcade game of 1989 in Japan, and is credited with saving the company from financial crisis.

Capcom has been noted as the last major publisher to be committed to 2D games, though it was not entirely by choice. The company's commitment to the Super Nintendo Entertainment System as its platform of choice caused it to lag behind other leading publishers in developing 3D-capable arcade boards. Also, the 2D animated cartoon-style graphics seen in games such as Darkstalkers: The Night Warriors and X-Men: Children of the Atom proved popular, leading Capcom to adopt them as a signature style and use them in future games.

In 1990, Capcom entered the bowling industry with Bowlingo. It was a coin-operated, electro-mechanical, fully automated mini ten-pin bowling installation. It was smaller than a standard bowling alley, designed to be smaller and cheaper for amusement arcades. Bowlingo drew significant earnings in North America upon release in 1990.

In 1994, Capcom adapted its Street Fighter series of fighting games into a film of the same name. While commercially successful, it was critically panned. A 2002 adaptation of its Resident Evil series faced similar criticism but was also successful in theaters. The company sees films as a way to build sales for its video games.

=== 2000–2009: Transition to modern gaming systems ===
In the early 2000s, Capcom focused many of its resources on bringing series from arcade and earlier consoles onto more modern hardware, bringing these games out from 2D to 3D space. One of the most successful titles during this period was Resident Evil 4 for the GameCube (2005), which received universal acclaim, was a financial success for Capcom, and led to ports to multiple systems. Other major successes include Street Fighter IV (2008).

Capcom debunked rumors that it was leaving the arcade business in 2001. While it did remain in the business in Japan, it gradually left the American market in 2003 and closed its arcade subsidiary in March 2004.

=== 2009–2017: Struggling releases and mismanagement ===
Despite its successes from the previous decade, Capcom released several titles that were considered misfires during the 2010s. Both Resident Evil 5 (2009) and Resident Evil 6 (2012) were seen to lean far too much into action-oriented gameplay while forgoing the balance with the survival horror elements of the earlier games in the series. Street Fighter V (2016) was released with minimal single-player content and poor online features. Street Fighter V failed to meet its sales target of 2 million in March 2016. Capcom outsourced the next Devil May Cry title to Ninja Theory, resulting in DmC: Devil May Cry (2013), a re-envisioning of the series that failed to resonate with players. Other newer IP like Lost Planet and Asura's Wrath also failed to gain significant audiences. Dragon's Dogma (2012), however, was one of the few newer titles during this period to be seen as a success.

Capcom partnered with Nyu Media in 2011 to publish and distribute the Japanese independent (dōjin soft) games that Nyu localized into the English language. The company works with the Polish localization company QLOC to port Capcom's games to other platforms; notably, examples are DmC: Devil May Cry's PC version and its PlayStation 4 and Xbox One remasters, Dragon's Dogma's PC version, and Dead Rising's version on PlayStation 4, Xbox One, and PC.

In 2012, Capcom came under criticism for controversial sales tactics, such as the implementation of disc-locked content, which requires players to pay for additional content that is already available within the game's files, most notably in Street Fighter X Tekken. The company defended the practice. It has also been criticized for other business decisions, such as not releasing certain games outside of Japan (most notably the Sengoku Basara series), abruptly cancelling anticipated projects (most notably Mega Man Legends 3), and shutting down Clover Studio.

On August 27, 2014, Capcom filed a patent infringement lawsuit against Koei Tecmo Games at the Osaka District Court for 980 million yen in damage. Capcom claimed Koei Tecmo infringed a patent it obtained in 2002 regarding a play feature in video games.

In 2015, the PlayStation 4 version of Ultra Street Fighter IV was pulled from the Capcom Pro Tour due to numerous technical issues and bugs.

=== 2017–present: Refocus on successful franchises ===
Following several years of unclear direction, management at Capcom changed in the mid-2010s to try to refocus the company on its successful properties. The company recognized that many of its titles during that period were attempts to bring Western game concepts into its titles, but it failed to capture how these mechanics were implemented in Western games. To correct this, the company changed its approach to try to develop games that would be fun for players worldwide, rather than developing games that felt like they were niche Japanese titles. The main studios in Japan began reaching out to Capcom's other worldwide studios to collaborate on game design to appeal to a broader range of players. Additionally, Capcom began developing the RE Engine to replace the older MT Framework, helping its studios develop across a wider range of hardware including newer consoles.

Resident Evil 7: Biohazard (2017) was the first game Capcom released under this new approach, which critics saw as a return to the series' roots. A similar approach was used to bring the Monster Hunter series, generally seen as a niche Japanese game due to its steep learning curve, to a broader market. Monster Hunter: World (2018) was developed to modernize the series' gameplay to simplify the learning curve. The game received critical praise and became Capcom's best-selling game as of 2025.

On January 28, 2019, Capcom announced that Sega would take over technical services for its arcade games starting in April.

On November 2, 2020, the company reported that its servers were affected by ransomware, scrambling its data, and the threat actors, the Ragnar Locker hacker group, had allegedly stolen 1TB of sensitive corporate data and were blackmailing Capcom to pay them to remove the ransomware. By mid-November, the group began putting information from the hack online, which included contact information for up to 350,000 of the company's employees and partners, as well as plans for upcoming games, indicating that Capcom opted to not pay the group. Capcom affirmed that no credit-card or other sensitive financial information was obtained in the hack.

In 2021, Capcom removed appearances of the Rising Sun Flag from its rerelease of Street Fighter II. Although Capcom did not provide an official explanation for the flag's removal, due to the flag-related controversy, it is speculated that it was done so to avoid offending segments of the international gaming community.

Artist and author Judy A. Juracek filed a lawsuit in June 2021 against Capcom for copyright infringement. In the court filings, she asserted Capcom had used images from her 1996 book Surfaces in its cover art and other assets for Resident Evil 4, Devil May Cry and other games. This was discovered due to the 2020 Capcom data breach, with several files and images matching those that were included within the book's companion CD-ROM. The court filings noted one image file of a metal surface, named ME0009 in Capcom's files, to have the same exact name on the book's CD-ROM. Juracek was seeking over $12 million in damages and $2,500 to $25,000 in false copyright management for each photograph Capcom used. Before a court date could be made, the matter was settled "amicably" in February 2022. It comes on the heels of Capcom being accused by Dutch movie director Richard Raaphorst of copying the monster design of his movie Frankenstein's Army into its game Resident Evil Village.

In February 2022, it was reported by Bloomberg that Saudi Arabia's Public Investment Fund had purchased a 5% stake in Capcom for an approximate value of US$332 million.

In July 2023, Capcom acquired Tokyo-based computer graphics studio Swordcanes Studio.

In July 2024, Capcom acquired Taiwan-based computer graphics studio Minimum Studios.

In March 2026, Electronic Gaming Development Company, the investment company of the Mohammed bin Salman Foundation (MiSK Foundation), announced an acquisition of 5% of shares in Capcom. In April 2026, this was increased to 6%.

On October 22, 2026, Capcom disclosed a data breach affecting 11,774,247 CAPCOM ID accounts worldwide. Exposed information included email addresses and account activity data; passwords for 196 accounts were changed without authorization and subsequently reset.

== Corporate structure ==
=== Development divisions ===
In its beginning few years, Capcom's Japan branch had three development groups referred to as "Planning Rooms", led by Tokuro Fujiwara, Takashi Nishiyama and Yoshiki Okamoto. After Nishiyama left the company, Capcom restructured into two divisions: one for arcade games and one for console games which were led by Okamoto and Fujiwara, respectively. Later, games developed internally were created by several numbered "Production Studios", each assigned to different games. Starting in 2002, the development process was reformed to share technologies and expertise better, and the individual studios were gradually restructured into bigger departments responsible for different tasks. While there are self-contained departments for the creation of arcade, pachinko and pachislot, online, and mobile games, the Consumer Games R&D Division is an amalgamation of subsections in charge of game development stages.

Capcom has two internal Consumer Games Development divisions:

- Division 1, headed by Jun Takeuchi, develops Resident Evil, Devil May Cry, Dead Rising, Dragon's Dogma, Ghosts 'n Goblins, Ōkami and other major franchises (usually targeting audiences globally).
- Division 2, headed by Ryozo Tsujimoto, develops Monster Hunter, Mega Man, Ace Attorney, Onimusha and other franchises with more traditional IP (usually targeting audiences in Asia) alongside fighting game franchises like Street Fighter and Marvel vs. Capcom.

In addition to these teams, Capcom commissions outside development studios to ensure a steady output of titles. However, following poor sales of Dark Void and Bionic Commando, its management has decided to limit outsourcing to sequels and newer versions of installments in existing franchises, reserving the development of original titles for its in-house teams. The production of games, budgets, and platform support are decided on in development approval meetings, attended by the company management and the marketing, sales and quality control departments.

Although the company often relies on existing franchises, it has also published and developed several titles for the Xbox 360, PlayStation 3, and Wii based on original intellectual property: Lost Planet: Extreme Condition, Dead Rising, Dragon's Dogma, Asura's Wrath, and Zack and Wiki. During this period, Capcom also helped publish several original titles from up-and-coming Western developers, including Remember Me, Dark Void, and Spyborgs, titles other publishers were not willing to gamble on. Other games of note are the titles Ōkami, Ōkamiden, and Ghost Trick: Phantom Detective.

=== Branches and subsidiaries ===
Capcom Co., Ltd.'s head office building and R&D building are in Chūō-ku, Osaka. The parent company also has a branch office in the Shinjuku Mitsui Building in Nishi-Shinjuku, Shinjuku, Tokyo; and the Ueno Facility, a branch office in Iga, Mie Prefecture.

The international Capcom Group encompasses 12 subsidiaries in Japan, rest of East Asia, North America, and Europe.

=== Game-related media ===
In addition to home, online, mobile, arcade, pachinko, and pachislot games, Capcom publishes strategy guides; maintains its own Plaza Capcom arcade centers in Japan; and licenses its franchise and character properties for tie-in products, movies, television series, and stage performances.

Suleputer, an in-house marketing and music label established in cooperation with Sony Music Entertainment Intermedia in 1998, publishes CDs, DVDs, and other media based on Capcom's games. Captivate (renamed from Gamers Day in 2008), an annual private media summit, is traditionally used for new game and business announcements.

== Creations ==
=== Hardware ===
Capcom's first arcade board system was the CP System, released in 1988 with the game Forgotten Worlds. They later designed the CP System II and CP System III.

In 2019, Capcom released the Capcom Home Arcade, containing a total of 16 built-in CPS-1 and CPS-2 emulated games.

=== Technology ===
- MT Framework
- RE Engine

== Game sales ==
Capcom's top 10 multi-million selling franchises (as of May 13, 2026)
Franchise	First release	Sales (m)
Resident Evil	1996	218
Monster Hunter	2004	132
Street Fighter	1987	60.0
Mega Man	1987	45.0
Devil May Cry	2001	42.0
Dead Rising	2006	19.0
Ace Attorney	2001	15.0
Dragon's Dogma	2012	14.0
Marvel vs. Capcom	1996	13.0
Onimusha	2001	11.0

Capcom started its Street Fighter franchise in 1987. The series of fighting games are among the most popular in their genre. Having sold over 50 million copies, it is one of Capcom's flagship franchises. The company also introduced its Mega Man series in 1987, which has sold over 40 million copies.

The company released the first entry in its Resident Evil survival horror series in 1996, which became its most successful game series, selling over 170 million copies. After releasing the second entry in the Resident Evil series, Capcom began a Resident Evil game for PlayStation 2. As it was significantly different from the existing series' games, Capcom decided to spin it into its own series, Devil May Cry. The first three entries were exclusively for PlayStation 2; further entries were released for non-Sony consoles. The entire series has sold over 30 million copies. Capcom began its Monster Hunter series in 2004, which has sold over 120 million copies on a variety of consoles.

Capcom compiles a "Platinum Titles" list, updated quarterly, of its games that have sold over one million copies. It contains over 100 video games. This table shows the top ten titles, by sold copies, as of December 31, 2025.

Title	Release date	Platform(s) considered	Sales (m)
Monster Hunter: World	January 2018	PlayStation 4, Xbox One, PC	30.83
Resident Evil 2	January 2019	PlayStation 4, PlayStation 5, Xbox One, Xbox Series X/S, Nintendo Switch, PC	20.38
Monster Hunter Rise	March 2021	Nintendo Switch, PlayStation 4, PlayStation 5, Xbox One, Xbox Series X/S, PC	20.00
Resident Evil 7: Biohazard	January 2017	PlayStation 4, PlayStation 5, Xbox One, Xbox Series X/S, Nintendo Switch, PC, Nintendo Switch 2	18.87
Resident Evil 4	March 2023	PlayStation 4, PlayStation 5, Xbox Series X/S, PC	17.15
Monster Hunter World: Iceborne	September 2019	PlayStation 4, Xbox One, PC	16.70
Resident Evil Village	May 2021	PlayStation 4, PlayStation 5, Xbox One, Xbox Series X/S, Nintendo Switch, PC, Nintendo Switch 2	16.27
Resident Evil 3	April 2020	PlayStation 4, PlayStation 5, Xbox One, Xbox Series X/S, Nintendo Switch, PC	14.93
Devil May Cry 5	March 2019	PlayStation 4, Xbox One, PC	14.78
Monster Hunter Wilds	February 2025	PlayStation 5, Xbox Series X/S, PC	11.80
Resident Evil: Requiem	February 2026	Nintendo Switch 2, PlayStation 5, Windows, Xbox Series X/S	8

== See also ==
=== Articles ===
- Capcom Cup
- Capcom Five
- DreamHack
- Evolution Championship Series

=== Companies founded by ex-Capcom employees ===
Name	Foundation	Affiliation
Arika	November 1, 1995	Founded by Akira Nishitani
Whoopee Camp	1996	Founded by Tokuro Fujiwara
Inti Creates	May 8, 1996	Founded by Takuya Aizu
Deep Space	May 5, 1998	Co-founded by Tokuro Fujiwara, a subsidiary of SCEI
Metro3D	1998	Founded by Joe Morici and George Nakayama
Dimps	March 6, 2000	Founded by Takashi Nishiyama and Hiroshi Matsumoto
UTV Ignition Games	September 26, 2001	Sawaki Takeyasu joined Ignition Tokyo, a subsidiary of UTV Ignition Games
Game Republic	July 1, 2003	Founded by Yoshiki Okamoto
Crafts & Meister	June 1, 2004	Founded by Noritaka Funamizu and Katsuhiro Sudo
PlatinumGames	October 1, 2007	Founded by Shinji Mikami, Atsushi Inaba, Hideki Kamiya, and Tatsuya Minami
Byking	June 4, 2008	Founded by Shinichiro Obata
Tango Gameworks	March 1, 2010	Founded by Shinji Mikami
Level-5 Comcept	December 1, 2010	Founded by Keiji Inafune as Comcept
M-Two	2017	Founded by Tatsuya Minami
Unbound	2022	Founded by Shinji Mikami
GPTRACK50	October 1, 2022	Founded by Hiroyuki Kobayashi
Birdkin Studio	September 9, 2024	Founded by Hideaki and Saori Utsumi
LightSpeed Japan Studio	2024	Hideaki Itsuno became head of the newly-created LightSpeed Japan Studio
Clovers	October 2024	Founded by Hideki Kamiya
