= Jill Valentine =

Character in Resident Evil

- Jill Valentine in Resident Evil 3 (2020)
- First appearance: Resident Evil (1996)
- Created by: Shinji Mikami; Isao Ohishi
- Designed by: Jun Takeuchi; Isao Ohishi
- Voiced by: English: Catherine Disher (Resident Evil 3: Nemesis and Marvel vs. Capcom 2) Heidi Anderson (Resident Evil remake) Kathleen Barr (Under the Skin) Patricia Ja Lee (The Umbrella Chronicles, Resident Evil 5, The Mercenaries 3D, Teppen) Kari Wahlgren (Marvel vs. Capcom 3 and Ultimate Marvel vs. Capcom 3) Michelle Ruff (Revelations, Operation Raccoon City, Revelations 2) Nicole Tompkins (Resident Evil 3, Resistance, Death Island, Goddess of Victory: Nikke) Chaney Crabb (Dead by Daylight); Japanese: Kikuko Inoue (Under the Skin) Atsuko Yuya (Apocalypse, Afterlife, Marvel vs. Capcom 3, Ultimate Marvel vs. Capcom 3, Revelations, Operation Raccoon City, Retribution, Project X Zone series, Resident Evil HD Remaster, Revelations 2, Teppen, Resident Evil 3, Resistance, Death Island, Goddess of Victory: Nikke) Miyuki Sawashiro (Welcome to Raccoon City)
- Motion capture: Various: Hanai Takahashi (Resident Evil remake) Patricia Ja Lee (The Umbrella Chronicles and Resident Evil 5) Nicole Tompkins (Resident Evil 3)
- Portrayed by: Various: Inezh (Resident Evil live-action cutscenes) Sienna Guillory (Apocalypse, Afterlife, Retribution) Hannah John-Kamen (Welcome to Raccoon City)

In-universe information
- Nationality: American

Jill Valentine (Note: Japanese: ジル・バレンタイン, Hepburn: Jiru Barentain) is a character in Resident Evil (Biohazard in Japan), a survival horror series created by the Japanese company Capcom. She was introduced as one of two player characters in the original Resident Evil (1996) with her partner, Chris Redfield, as a member of the Raccoon City Police Department's Special Tactics And Rescue Service (S.T.A.R.S.) unit. Jill and Chris fight the Umbrella Corporation, a pharmaceutical company whose bioterrorism creates zombies and other bio-organic weapons, and later become founding members of the United Nations' Bioterrorism Security Assessment Alliance (BSAA).

Jill is the protagonist of several Resident Evil games, novelizations and films and has appeared in other game franchises, including Marvel vs. Capcom, Project X Zone, Teppen, and Dead by Daylight. In later games, such as the 2002 Resident Evil remake, The Umbrella Chronicles (2007), Resident Evil 5 (2009), and The Mercenaries 3D (2011), her features were based on Canadian model and actress Julia Voth. Several actresses have portrayed Jill, including Sienna Guillory and Hannah John-Kamen in the live-action Resident Evil films.

Video game publications described Jill as among the most popular and iconic video game characters, and praised her as the most likable and consistent Resident Evil character. She has received acclaim and criticism with regard to gender representation in video games. Several publications praised the series for its portrayal of women, and considered Jill significantly less sexualized than other female game characters; she was also cited as an example of a female character who was as competent as her male counterparts. Others said that she was weakened as a protagonist by attributes which undermined her role as a heroine – specifically, an unrealistic body shape which did not reflect her military background. Some of Jill's overtly-sexualized costumes have also been criticized.

== Concept and design ==
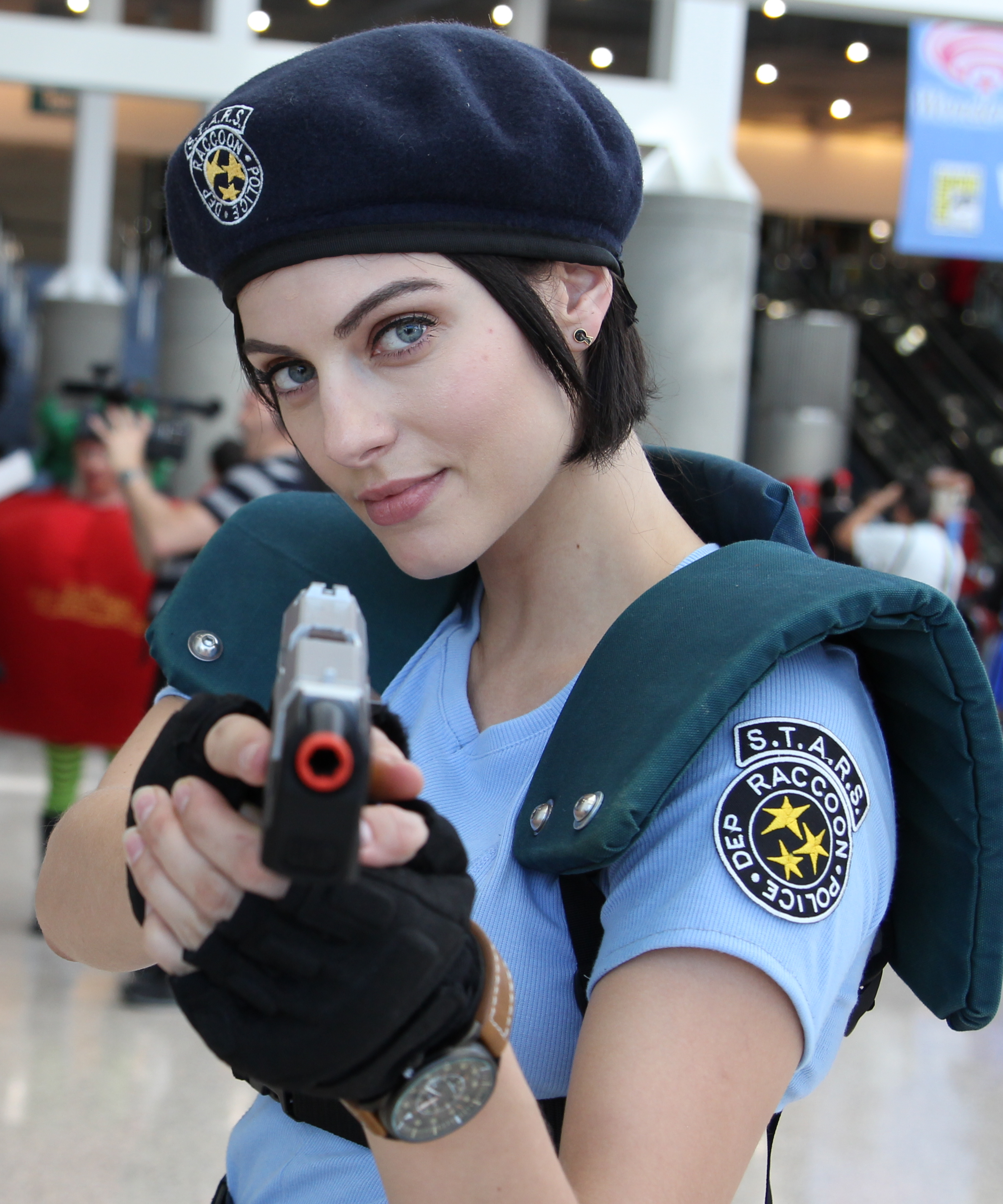
Julia Voth, pictured cosplaying Jill's original design from the first Resident Evil and its remake, was the model for the character's appearance from 2002 until the 2020 remake of Resident Evil 3.

Jill was introduced as one of two playable protagonists with her partner, Chris Redfield, in Capcom's 1996 survival horror video game Resident Evil. She was created by director Shinji Mikami and designer Isao Ohishi. To avoid the sexual objectification of women in video games, Mikami refused to eroticize or depict women as submissive in Resident Evil; Jill was characterized as independent. In 2025, director Hideki Kamiya stated that he took the name "Jill" from one of his reference books, and the name "Valentine" was chosen randomly after he heard someone say Valentine's Day.

Of Japanese and French descent, she excelled at bomb disposal during her training with Delta Force and later joined the Special Tactics and Rescue Service (S.T.A.R.S.) special operations unit. Experienced with weapons, explosives and lock picking, she was intelligent, brave, and loyal. Although their storylines progress in "the same general direction", the gameplay differs for Jill and Chris; her inventory is larger and she has a lock-pick, giving her early access to more health and ammunition. Based on these differences, Jill was recommended for first-time players of Resident Evil. Game designer Jun Takeuchi gave each character a unique clothing style to make them instantly recognisable, with Jill's character wearing a distinctive blue beret.

According to digital media scholar Esther MacCallum-Stewart, Mikami's female characters possess unique qualities (making them viable choices for players over of their male counterparts) and their combat attire helped them avoid criticism for catering to the male gaze. Mikami said, "I don't know if I've put more emphasis on women characters, but when I do introduce them, it is never as objects. In [other] games, they will be peripheral characters with ridiculous breast physics. I avoid that sort of obvious eroticism." Despite this, subsequent games in the series not directed by Mikami depicted Jill in revealing costumes. Media scholars said that players have been encouraged to objectify and identify with the character, and several suggested that Mikami's initial portrayal of Jill as a military professional tempered the ability of subsequent game directors to overtly sexualize the character.

Jill was redesigned over the course of the series; in the 2002 remake of the original game, her appearance was based on Canadian model and actress Julia Voth. Capcom producer Hiroyuki Kobayashi said that they made her more kawaii in the remake, but kept her tough and muscular. (Note: Hiroyuki Kobayashi: "Instead, Jill got a little cuter kawaii. Her action and atmosphere has charm. This time, we expect a lot more people [to be] charmed by Jill.") Voth was also the model for Jill Valentine in Resident Evil: The Umbrella Chronicles (2007) and Resident Evil 5 (2009). Resident Evil 5 has Chris as a protagonist, and its designers opted to focus on how both characters had aged since the original game. Jill underwent another redesign for Resident Evil 5 to reflect her status as a test subject in biological research experiments. Depicted with blonde hair, pale skin, and a tight-fitting outfit – described as a battle suit – her changes represent the effects of the experiments. Fans criticized the new appearance as an example of whitewashing. MacCallum-Stewart suggested that the series' popularity was damaged by the unexplained reappearance of Jill as a "mind-controlled BDSM assassin". In the 2020 remake of Resident Evil 3, the character is based on Russian model Sasha Zotova. Jill's redesign reflects the developers' vision behind her reimagination as an action hero; because the art direction for the remake is based on photorealism, Capcom wanted to ensure that Jill fit into the game-world environment.

Alternate costumes as rewards for players have been a staple of the Resident Evil series. Completing the 2002 remake unlocked the ability to dress Jill in her Resident Evil 3: Nemesis miniskirt costume and as Sarah Connor in the 1991 film Terminator 2: Judgment Day. The miniskirt was added during development at the staff's request; developers changed camera angles to reduce upskirting, matching the colors of the skirt and underwear to make any upskirting less obvious. The outfit reappeared in Resident Evil: The Mercenaries 3D (2011). A prequel to the events of Resident Evil 5, the downloadable content (DLC) episode Lost in Nightmares includes an alternative outfit for Jill which was based on military clothing and sportswear. Since Resident Evil: Revelations (2012) was set at sea, her costume resembled a wetsuit. The initial design featured more tactical gear attached to her buoyancy control device, but it was removed to highlight her physical contours. (Note: "At the beginning of the game, Jill is wearing diving equipment, including BCD (buoyancy control device). I thought the gear had interesting details, but because the team wanted to show her bodyline, it was changed to one that only had straps.") Her alternate outfit in the game, a revealing pirate costume, was colorful to contrast with the storyline's dark themes.

=== Voice-over and live-action actresses ===
The actresses who appeared in the original game's live-action cutscenes and recorded the voice work were credited only by their first names; Jill was played by "Inezh", a high school student. (Note: Shinji Mikami: "We shot the opening movie in the Tama River side of Japan. In the beginning of the movie, Jill makes her face look like she is scared, but she was not [supposed to be]. The actress for Jill was only a high-school girl at the time and she had to run around outside in the middle of the night and got mosquito bites, so she made that face; 'I wanna go home!' She was just an immature kid. That cheap shot was totally my mistake. I didn't have enough time and money, also I should have picked the actors judging on performances but it's too late now of course.") Voice actresses who played Jill included Catherine Disher in Resident Evil 3, Heidi Anderson in the 2002 remake, Kathleen Barr in Capcom's 2004 action-adventure game Under the Skin, and Tara Platt in Pachislot Biohazard (an arcade game released in Japan). Patricia Ja Lee provided the voice and motion capture for The Umbrella Chronicles and Resident Evil 5. Kari Wahlgren voiced the character in the 2011 game Marvel vs. Capcom 3: Fate of Two Worlds and Ultimate Marvel vs. Capcom 3. Jill was voiced in Revelations by Michelle Ruff, who returned for the non-canon game Resident Evil: Operation Raccoon City. Nicole Tompkins voiced and provided motion capture for Jill in the 2020 Resident Evil 3 remake, and reprised her role in the CG animated film Resident Evil: Death Island. Atsuko Yuya voiced Jill in the Japanese versions of the games.

The character appeared in three entries of the original Resident Evil film series, where she was played by English actress Sienna Guillory. Hannah John-Kamen played the role in the 2021 film, Resident Evil: Welcome to Raccoon City.

== Appearances ==
=== In the Resident Evil series ===
Resident Evil games featuring Jill Valentine
1996	Resident Evil
1997	Resident Evil: Director's Cut
1998
1999	Resident Evil 3: Nemesis
2000–2001
2002	Resident Evil (remake)
2003–2006
2007	Resident Evil: The Umbrella Chronicles
2008
2009	Resident Evil 5
2010
2011	Resident Evil: The Mercenaries 3D
2012	Resident Evil: Revelations
2012	Resident Evil: Operation Raccoon City
2013–2019
2020	Resident Evil 3 (remake)
2020	Resident Evil: Resistance
2021
2022	Resident Evil Re:Verse

Each game in the series is set in the fictional American metropolis of Raccoon City until its destruction at the end of Resident Evil 3: Nemesis. Subsequent games with Jill are set in Russia Africa, and on the Mediterranean Sea. The original game is set in July 1998 in a mansion on the outskirts of Raccoon City, which Jill and her team enter while searching for their colleagues. Working with partner Barry Burton, she discovers that the mansion is a façade for a biological warfare laboratory operated by the Umbrella Corporation; its undead occupants are scientists who developed the T-virus mutagen. Her commander, Albert Wesker, is a double agent for Umbrella. Jill and Chris are among five survivors of the incident, who form a strong friendship and become passionate opponents of bioterrorism.

Jill did not appear in Resident Evil 2 (1998), as the production team used new protagonists (Leon S. Kennedy and Claire Redfield) to preserve the original game's horror elements; Mikami thought that Jill and Chris would be too experienced to be frightened by the sequel's events. She returned as the sole protagonist in Resident Evil 3 (1999). Mikami – the lead producer of Nemesis and the concurrently-produced Resident Evil – Code: Veronica (2000) – wanted each game to highlight a female character who had previously appeared in the series; Jill is the protagonist in Nemesis, and Claire is the lead character in Code: Veronica. Observers suggested that these decisions were made as a result of the success of the Tomb Raider series, with Lara Croft as the protagonist.

Nemesis is set two months after the first game, when Jill joins the Raccoon City Police Department (RCPD) to protect as many civilians as possible from the T-virus. The reason given by Capcom for her informal clothing in this entry was her resignation from the police immediately before the city was infected with the virus. Jill quit in protest over the failure of law enforcement to take action against Umbrella, but remained in the city to investigate the corporation. (Note: "As our story opens, we learn what happened to Jill Valentine after the events of the original Resident Evil. Disillusioned with the failure of Raccoon City's Police Department to act against Umbrella Corporation and its genetic experiments, she decides to quit the force." Jill's diary can be unlocked in Resident Evil: The Umbrella Chronicles (2007). The entry for August 24, 1998, reads: "Chris left town today for Europe. Barry said that he was going to send his family to Canada first and then meet up with Chris after that. I have decided to remain in Raccoon City for the time being because I know that the research facility here will be vital to this case. After gathering as much information as I can, I will regroup with Barry and Chris in about a month. I know that is when my true struggle will begin...") The police uniform she wore in the original game was replaced with a less-formal blue tube top, black miniskirt, and knee-high boots.

In Nemesis, Jill escapes Raccoon City before its destruction by a nuclear strike as part of a U.S. government cover-up. She is pursued by Nemesis, a supersoldier tasked with killing the remaining S.T.A.R.S. team members. Instead of killing Jill, Nemesis infects her with the T-virus; her new partner, Carlos Oliveira – a former Umbrella mercenary – cures her of the infection with an Umbrella-produced vaccine. The Umbrella Chronicles is set in 2003, when Jill and Chris join a private organization to expose Umbrella's biological-warfare activities (leading a group to destroy their only remaining research facility). (Note: Albert Wesker: "It was the year 2003. Umbrella had a base of operations in Russia, where they were working on new B.O.W. (bio-organic weapons). They were preparing to arm the unstable regions of the world with their bio weaponry. Chris and Jill had joined a regional biohazard containment unit and had heard rumors about this nightmarish facility.") After the fall of the corporation, Jill and Carlos become founding members of the United Nations' Bioterrorism Security Assessment Alliance (BSAA). In Revelations – set two years later – Jill and new partner Parker Luciani are sent to rescue Chris, who is allegedly being held hostage on a ghost ship in the Mediterranean. Once aboard, she discovers that the ship is infested with a new type of mutagen capable of infecting the aquatic ecosystem. Jill and Chris unravel a political conspiracy involving an earlier mutagenic outbreak and a botched investigation by a rival agency.

Resident Evil 5 takes place in 2009 in the fictional African town of Kijuju, where terrorists are turning local residents into zombies. One of these terrorists is Jill, who was missing in action for the previous two-and-a-half years. Set in 2006, the Lost in Nightmares DLC has Jill and Chris searching a mansion for Umbrella's founder; to save Chris from Wesker, Jill tackles Wesker through a window. Neither body is recovered, and Jill is declared dead. She was actually injured by the fall and taken hostage by Wesker, who then uses her as a test subject in his biological experiments. The antibodies produced by Jill's system as a result of her Nemesis-era T-virus infection are the basis for the Uroboros Virus, the catalyst for the events of Resident Evil 5.

During Resident Evil 5, Chris discovers that Jill is alive; Wesker attached a mind-control device to her which forces her to commit terrorist acts and fight Chris and his new partner, local BSAA agent Sheva Alomar. Jill has enough self-control to open her outfit so the device can be seen and removed. After its removal, she explains that she knew what she was doing but was unable to control her actions and urges Chris and Sheva to continue their mission. Another DLC episode, Desperate Escape, describes how Jill escaped safely with the help of local BSAA agent Josh Stone before they help Chris and Sheva kill Wesker.

=== Other appearances ===
Jill Valentine's Resident Evil 3 outfit (left) and its inclusion for the character (played by Sienna Guillory in the film Resident Evil: Apocalypse) had a mixed response.

The character appears in several Resident Evil films. She was scheduled to be the protagonist of the first Resident Evil movie (2002), under the direction of George A. Romero. When Paul W. S. Anderson took over from Romero, he created a new character for the film series: Alice, played by Milla Jovovich. Jill appears in the 2004 sequel, Resident Evil: Apocalypse, as a disgraced police officer who escapes the ruins of Raccoon City with the help of Alice and other survivors. Her outfit in the film is based on her clothing from Resident Evil 3. Anderson considered describing the costume as an undercover outfit, and Jovovich suggested a heat wave as the explanation. Anderson eventually decided to ignore the issue altogether, saying that people who criticized her attire "probably shouldn't be watching a Resident Evil movie [at all]."

Jill appears in a post-credits scene in Resident Evil: Afterlife (2010), wearing the mind-controlling device from Resident Evil 5 and leading an attack against Alice, Chris, Claire, and the survivors they rescued after a viral outbreak in Los Angeles. In Resident Evil: Retribution (2012), she is an antagonist programmed to capture Alice who regains control of herself after Alice removes Wesker's mind-control device. The film includes a fight between Jill and Alice with about 200 moves. (Note: Paul W. S. Anderson: "Milla and I stay in touch with the fans, and one of the things I know they've been looking forward to is a fight between Jill Valentine and Alice. We intend to deliver that." Sienna Guillory: "There's something like 200 [fight] moves, it's massive and it's so intricate.") She did not appear in the final film, Resident Evil: The Final Chapter (2016), apparently dying offscreen. According to Jovovich, Jill was excluded because there were too many other Resident Evil characters. The Resident Evil film series received consistently-negative reviews; Cinefantastique praised Guillory's performance in Apocalypse as the film's only highlight. In the reboot film Resident Evil: Welcome to Raccoon City (2021), Jill is played by Hannah John-Kamen. She has also appeared in the 2023 animated film, Resident Evil: Death Island. Jill's youthful appearance in the film, despite being 40 years old, was said to be a result of the T-virus slowing her aging.

She is a playable character in several non-canonical Resident Evil games. The character appears in a number of Resident Evil mobile games and is the protagonist of Resident Evil: Genesis (2008), an alternative-story version of the original game. Jill is a playable character in Marvel vs. Capcom 2 (2000), Marvel vs. Capcom 3 (2011), Project X Zone (2012), Project X Zone 2 (2015), Dead by Daylight (2016), Puzzle Fighter (2017), the digital collectible card game Teppen (2019), and has been announced as an additional character in Goddess of Victory: Nikke (2022). She is an alternate skin for Chun-Li in Super Gem Fighter Mini Mix (1998), Cammy in Street Fighter V (2016), and Zofia in Tom Clancy's The Division 2 (2019), and can be selected as a playable skin in We Love Golf! (2007), Tom Clancy's Rainbow Six Siege (2015), and Fortnite Battle Royale (2017). Jill has a non-playable cameo in 2004's Under the Skin, is one of the 'Spirit' power-ups in Super Smash Bros. Ultimate (2018), and a robot dressed as Jill makes a brief reference in Astro's Playroom (2020) and Astro Bot (2024).

Jill appears in novelizations of the films and games and plays a supporting role in the first novel, Resident Evil: Caliban Cove (1998), of a series by S. D. Perry. In Resident Evil: The Umbrella Conspiracy (1998), Perry's novelization of the original game, Jill's Delta Force background is not mentioned; before her career in law enforcement, she is said to have acted as an accomplice for her father Dick Valentine, a professional thief. Several comic books based on the games were released, and she is a character in Bandai's Resident Evil Deck Building Card Game (2011) and Steamforged Games' Resident Evil 3: The Board Game (2021). Merchandise featuring Jill includes action figures, figurines and a replica gun. The character was featured in Resident Evil-themed attractions at Universal Studios Japan and Universal Orlando's Halloween Horror Nights. Capcom's theme restaurant, Biohazard Cafe & Grill S.T.A.R.S., which opened in Tokyo's Shibuya in 2012, served a noodle dish named for her. (Note: The dish was "S.T.A.R.S. Original Noodles (Women Only) 'Jill Ver.'". There was a corresponding "(Men Only) 'Barry Ver.'".) In 2026, to celebrate the release of Resident Evil Requiem (2026), Alamo Drafthouse Cinema introduced a Resident Evil–inspired menu featuring a dish called "Jill Sandwich". (Note: Jill’s sandwich features double all-beef patties, applewood-smoked bacon, melted cheese, pickles, a special burger sauce, all served on a butter-toasted bun.)

== Reception and legacy ==
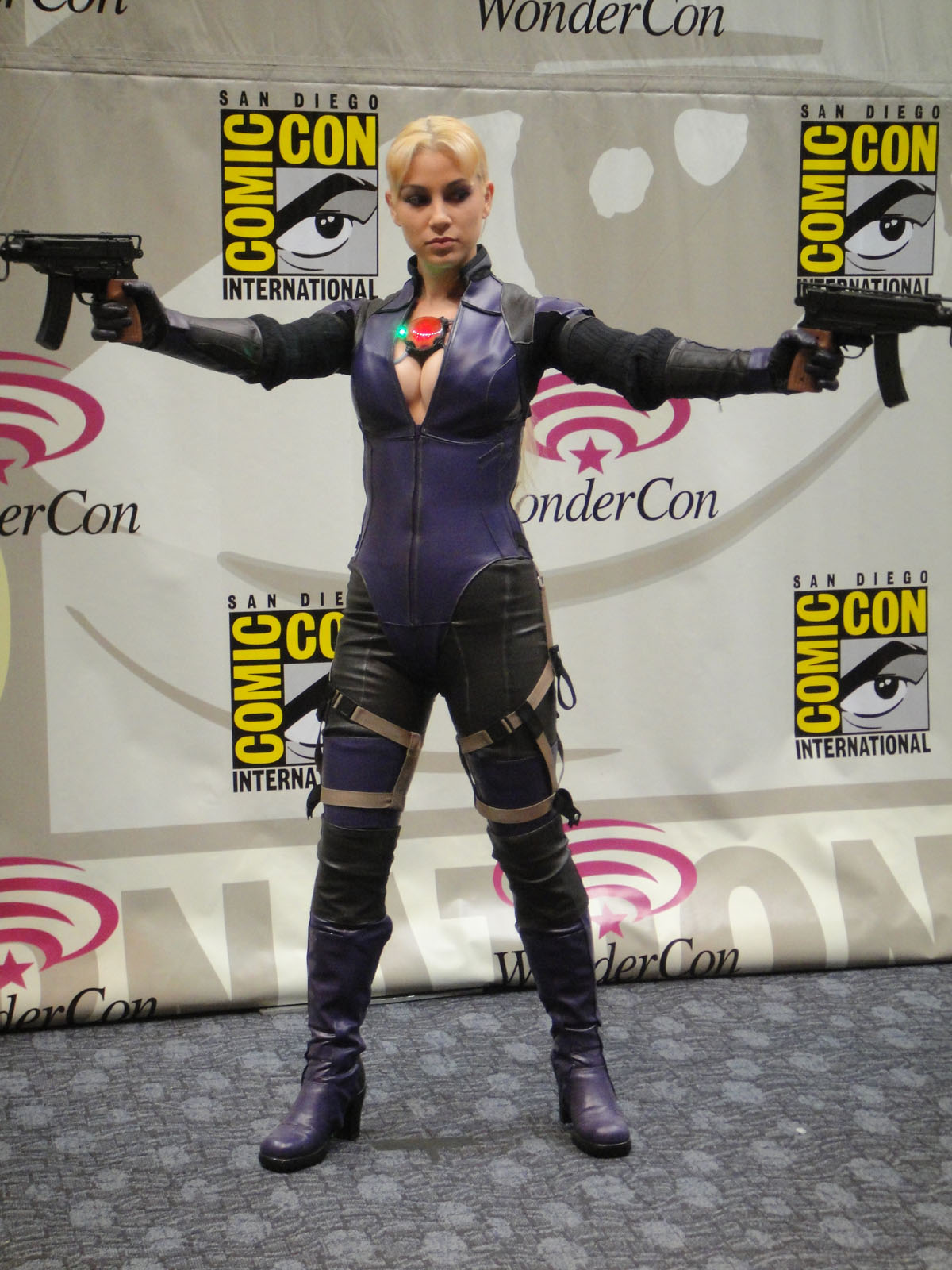
A cosplayer recreates Jill's redesigned appearance in Resident Evil 5, a brainwashed antagonist who was scrutinized by Esther MacCallum-Stewart.

Game publications, including the 2011 version of the Guinness World Records Gamer's Edition, described Jill Valentine as among the most popular and iconic video-game characters. At the 2013 Penny Arcade Expo, journalists and game developers named her one of the top three lead characters in Western and Japanese role-playing video games. Magazines praised her as the most likable Resident Evil character, with the series' most believable and consistent story arc. The character was cited as one of the video game industry's greatest mascots, (Note: "Mascots are a crucial part of video gaming lore. This is because, as their legacies begin to develop, and the years pile on, they begin to represent not only their respective companies, but also the gaming industry as a whole. Think: where would we be today if not for a certain plumber, one blue hedgehog, and our favorite yellow hero swallowing up Power Pellets and ghosts? Well, somewhere, but not in the place we are now, where video games are a billion – yes, that's billion with a "B" – dollar industry.) a tough, strong, attractive female character who could appeal to a broad demographic.

Critics noted that Jill was not oversexualized in her early appearances. She was highlighted as an example of the series' female characters who were not judged solely on gender, and for having "the most sensible design" for a female character of the mid-to-late 1990s. Her professional relationship with Chris was praised for its basis in loyalty rather than romance and its balance of personalities: Jill's intellect and Chris's brawn. Female digital critics felt that several of Jill's features undermine her role as a heroine and weaken her as a protagonist; her body shape is unrealistic and not reflective of her military background or physical training, and she was the only member of her team in the original game to not wear a bulletproof vest. The extent to which her appearance changed over the course of the game series has been criticized as excessive, with the Resident Evil 3 outfit derided for deviating too much from Mikami's initial militaristic depiction of the character. In Tropes vs. Women in Video Games, feminist media critic Anita Sarkeesian criticized Jill's alternate costumes as too revealing (particularly the pirate costume in Resident Evil: Revelations). Sarkeesian cited Jill's movement in Revelations as an example of female characters who walk in an overtly-sexualized manner.

MacCallum-Stewart said that the first Resident Evil game became famous for its "extremely clunky dialogue and voice acting, an element which lent the otherwise suspenseful game an element of charm that endeared it to players". Although weak dialogue might be attributed to poor translation of the original Japanese text, she said that this inadvertently helped to differentiate the series from its rivals. Several lines from the game achieved enduring popularity; "You were almost a Jill sandwich", a quip delivered in awkward voiceover by Barry Burton after a falling ceiling trap almost crushes Jill, was revived as an Internet meme a decade after the game's release and became the subject of fan art depicting Jill in (or as) a sandwich. Capcom used the line in several of their later games, including Dead Rising (2006), Resident Evil: Uprising (2009), Resident Evil: Revelations 2 (2015), and Resident Evil: Resistance (2020). Another piece of dialogue by Burton – "And, Jill, here's a lock pick. It might be handy if you, the master of unlocking, take it with you" – also became popular. The quote, parodied for its excessive silence between words, was removed from later editions.
