= Ultimate Marvel vs. Capcom 3 =

2011 video game

- Front cover art, designed by Shinkiro, featuring several playable characters from the game
- Developers: Capcom; Eighting
- Publisher: Capcom
- Directors: Hiroyuki Nara; Go Usuma
- Producer: Ryota Niitsuma
- Artist: Takuro Fuse
- Composer: Hideyuki Fukasawa
- Series: Marvel vs. Capcom
- Engine: MT Framework
- Platforms: PlayStation 3 Xbox 360; PlayStation Vita; PlayStation 4 Windows; Xbox One
- Release: PlayStation 3, Xbox 360: NA: November 15, 2011; JP: November 17, 2011; EU: November 18, 2011; PlayStation Vita: JP: December 17, 2011; NA/EU: February 22, 2012 (Note: The game was available on February 15, 2012, in North America for those who ordered the "First Edition" PlayStation Vita bundle.); PlayStation 4: WW: December 3, 2016; Windows, Xbox One: WW: March 7, 2017
- Genre: Fighting
- Modes: Single-player; Multiplayer

Ultimate Marvel vs. Capcom 3 (Note: Japanese: アルティメット マーヴル VS. カプコン3, Hepburn: Arutimetto Māvuru bāsasu Kapukon Surī) is a 2011 crossover fighting game developed by Capcom in collaboration with Eighting. It is an updated version of Marvel vs. Capcom 3: Fate of Two Worlds. The game features characters from both Capcom's video game franchises and comic book series published by Marvel Comics. It was originally released for the PlayStation 3 and Xbox 360 in November 2011, then as a launch title for the PlayStation Vita in December 2011, and later re-released on PlayStation 4, Windows and Xbox One.

In Ultimate Marvel vs. Capcom 3, players select a team of three characters to engage in combat and attempt to knock out their opponents. As an update, the game utilizes largely identical gameplay mechanics to the original. However, both the aerial combat and X-Factor systems, introduced in Fate of Two Worlds, have received adjustments. In addition to gameplay modifications and new playable characters, the game features several aesthetic changes.

After the events of the 2011 Tōhoku earthquake and tsunami disrupted the development schedule for downloadable content for Fate of Two Worlds, the additional content was created into a standalone title, Ultimate Marvel vs. Capcom 3, for a discounted retail price. The game received generally positive reviews upon release; critics praised the expanded character roster and improved online experience, but criticized the lack of new features and game modes. A sequel, titled Marvel vs. Capcom: Infinite, was released in 2017.

== Gameplay ==
Doctor Strange attacks Nemesis T-Type on the S.H.I.E.L.D. Air Show stage. Ultimate Marvel vs. Capcom 3 features a new HUD designed to give the player's current character and X-Factor ability more visual prominence.

Ultimate Marvel vs. Capcom 3 is an updated version of Marvel vs. Capcom 3: Fate of Two Worlds, an arcade-style fighting game, and changes little from the basic gameplay of the original. Players select teams of three different characters to engage in one-on-one combat. The game utilizes the same tag team-based fighting mechanics as its predecessors; players may choose to swap between their characters at any point during a match. Players must use the various attacks in their arsenal, such as character assists, special moves, and hyper combos, to exhaust their opponent's life gauge and defeat the entire enemy team, or have the most cumulative health when time runs out. While the core mechanics remain the same, a number of aesthetic changes have been made in Ultimate Marvel vs. Capcom 3, with a stronger emphasis on the comic book motif. The HUD, character selection, and stage selection screens have been redesigned. In addition, many returning characters receive balancing changes, which include new moves and animation tweaks.

Ultimate Marvel vs. Capcom 3 uses the same simplified, three-button control scheme of undefined light, medium, and heavy attacks introduced in Fate of Two Worlds. The "exchange button", used to launch opponents into the air and switch between characters while performing air combos, returns. The aerial exchange feature has been altered in Ultimate Marvel vs. Capcom 3; players can either remove meter from their opponent's Hyper Combo gauge, add meter to their own gauge, or simply deal more damage. The "X-Factor" mechanic, which grants increased damage output, speed, and health regeneration for a limited time, also reappears from Fate of Two Worlds. In Ultimate Marvel vs. Capcom 3, the attack and speed boosts for each character while using X-Factor have been adjusted. X-Factor can now be used while in the air, as opposed to the previous game, in which activation was restricted to characters on the ground.

=== Modes ===
Ultimate Marvel vs. Capcom 3 includes several game modes from the original, including Arcade Mode, where the player fights against AI-controlled opponents to reach the final boss character, Galactus; Versus Mode, where two players engage in combat; Mission Mode, which includes a series of trials for each playable character; and Training Mode. "Heroes and Heralds" is a free downloadable single-player and multiplayer team-based mode where players earn new abilities with upgrade cards, customize their characters with new powers, and compete in factions as either the heroes defending Earth or as one of Galactus' Heralds. The "ability cards", which feature various characters from the Marvel and Capcom universes, unlock special power-ups, such as invisibility and projectile invincibility, for use during mode-specific combat. Up to three different cards may be equipped at once, with more than 100 cards available to collect. A new offline mode, called "Galactus Mode", allows players to fight as Galactus against AI-controlled opponents.

An optimized netcode is present in the game, providing smoother online play compared to Fate of Two Worlds. A new spectator mode allows up to six players to watch online matches between other players. Rematch features and leaderboard functionality have also been improved to enhance the game's online experience.

=== Playable characters ===
Ultimate Marvel vs. Capcom 3 features the original 36 characters from Marvel vs. Capcom 3: Fate of Two Worlds and introduces 12 new playable fighters. Jill Valentine and Shuma-Gorath, the two characters released as downloadable content (DLC) for the previous game, remained available for download, up until all DLC for the game was removed from online stores in December 2013; they are included in the PlayStation 4, Xbox One, and PC re-releases. Characters added to Ultimate are marked in bold.

==== Marvel characters ====
- Captain America
- Deadpool
- Doctor Doom
- **Doctor Strange**
- Dormammu
- **Ghost Rider**
- **Hawkeye**
- Hulk
- **Iron Fist**
- Iron Man
- Magneto
- MODOK
- **Nova**
- Phoenix
- **Rocket Raccoon**
- Sentinel
- She-Hulk
- Shuma-Gorath (Note: Formerly available as downloadable content in the PlayStation 3 and Xbox 360 versions. Available by default in the PlayStation 4, Xbox One and PC versions.)
- Spider-Man
- Storm
- Super-Skrull
- Taskmaster
- Thor Odinson
- Wolverine
- X-23

==== Capcom characters ====
- Akuma
- Albert Wesker
- Amaterasu
- Arthur
- Chris Redfield
- Chun-Li
- Crimson Viper
- Dante
- Felicia
- **Firebrand**
- **Frank West**
- Hsien-Ko
- Jill Valentine
- Mike Haggar
- Morrigan Aensland
- Nathan "Rad" Spencer
- **Nemesis T-Type**
- **Phoenix Wright**
- Ryu
- **Strider Hiryu**
- Trish
- Tron Bonne
- **Vergil**
- Viewtiful Joe
- Zero

== Development ==
On July 20, 2011, at San Diego Comic-Con, Capcom announced that an updated version of Marvel vs. Capcom 3: Fate of Two Worlds was under development. The update, titled Ultimate Marvel vs. Capcom 3, would add new characters, stages, modes, and other enhancements to improve the game's balance and online functionality. According to Capcom, many new features and refinements, such as the addition of a spectator mode and tweaks to X-Factor, were the results of fan feedback. At the 2011 Tokyo Game Show, Capcom video game producer, Yoshinori Ono, would later announce that the game would also be released as a launch title for the PlayStation Vita. The handheld edition promised to contain the same content as the console versions, in addition to touchscreen control support.

After the release of Marvel vs. Capcom 3: Fate of Two Worlds, the game's development team had plans to release more downloadable content. However, after the 2011 Tōhoku earthquake and tsunami, in addition to staff health issues, delayed the development schedule, producer Ryota Niitsuma and his team decided to release the proposed DLC, along with rebalanced gameplay and other additions, as a separate installment. As a result, the makeup of Ultimate Marvel vs. Capcom 3 is split "about half and half" between DLC meant for Fate of Two Worlds and brand new content.

Character selection was a collaborative process between Capcom and Marvel. According to Seth Killian, a former community manager for Capcom, Marvel presented a list of their own characters that they were interested in seeing in Ultimate Marvel vs. Capcom 3. Capcom then provided input regarding moveset possibilities in order to reach a consensus. Each company also had their own set of interests and priorities. Marvel characters, such as Rocket Raccoon and Nova, were chosen to cross-promote upcoming products. On the other hand, Capcom sought to bring more diversity into the cast. For example, Capcom wanted a monster-like character that could fight while in the air, leading to the inclusion of Firebrand.

== Release ==
The reversible cover art, created by Mark Brooks, included in the North American release

Ultimate Marvel vs. Capcom 3 was released for the PlayStation 3 and Xbox 360 on November 15, 2011, in North America, November 17 in Japan, and November 18 in Europe. The PlayStation Vita version was released on December 17, 2011, in Japan, and February 22, 2012, in North America and Europe. People who ordered the PlayStation Vita "First Edition" bundle in North America were able to receive an early copy of Ultimate Marvel vs. Capcom 3 on February 15, 2012, one week ahead of the console's official launch date.

To promote Ultimate Marvel vs. Capcom 3, special retailer-exclusive costume packs were available as pre-order bonuses. If the game was pre-ordered from GameStop, the players received the Femme Fatale Pack (Chun-Li, Morrigan, Storm, X-23). Amazon offered the New Age of Heroes Costume Pack (Akuma, Doctor Doom, Sentinel, Strider Hiryu), while Best Buy gave access to the Villains Costume Pack (C. Viper, M.O.D.O.K., Super-Skrull, Wesker). After the game's launch, several other costume packs became available for purchase on specific dates through the Xbox Live Marketplace and PlayStation Network. The Ancient Warriors Costume Pack, consisting of Arthur, Firebrand, Hulk, and Magneto, was originally planned to be released on December 20, 2011, but, on December 19, Capcom announced that the pack would be delayed until March 6 following year, due to existing controversy with Magneto's alternate costume. The costume in question, which was based on Magneto's appearance in Marvel's House of M series, bore similarities to the attire of the King of Spain, Juan Carlos I, and was later removed from the pack.

Prior to the release of Ultimate Marvel vs. Capcom 3, both Capcom and Marvel announced that the game would include reversible packaging. The front cover art featured the work of Capcom illustrator Shinkiro, while the reverse side featured the art of Marvel Comics' Mark Brooks. Brook's alternate cover featured all twelve of the game's new characters in his own comic book style. Both pieces of art were printed on a single reversible cover for the entire first run of Ultimate Marvel vs. Capcom 3 in North America.

On December 13, 2013, Capcom announced that digital versions of Ultimate Marvel vs. Capcom 3 and its DLC would be removed from online platforms towards the end of the month, following the apparent expiration of Capcom's licensing contracts with Marvel Comics. The game was pulled from the PlayStation Network on December 17 and 19 in North America and Europe, respectively, and from the Xbox Live Arcade on December 26.

Later, on December 3, 2016, Ultimate Marvel vs. Capcom 3 was re-released digitally for the PlayStation 4, coinciding with the announcement of Marvel vs. Capcom: Infinite; digital re-releases for Windows and Xbox One were released on March 7, 2017. These versions included all previously released downloadable content, including Jill Valentine and Shuma-Gorath, a new gallery mode containing artwork from Marvel vs. Capcom: Official Complete Works, and an improved 1080p resolution at 60 frames per second. Physical copies of the PlayStation 4 and Xbox One versions were made available for a limited time through GameStop and EB Games. The physical editions included updated cover art and an exclusive 10-page comic book featuring the artwork of Marvel Comics' Sean Chen and Gerardo Sandoval.

== Reception ==
Reception

Aggregate score
| Aggregator | Score |
|---|---|
| Metacritic | PS3: 80/100; X360: 79/100; VITA: 80/100; PS4: 77/100; XONE: 78/100 |

Review scores
| Publication | Score |
|---|---|
| 1Up.com | B+ |
| G4 | 4/5 |
| Game Informer | 8/10 |
| GamePro | 4/5 |
| GameSpot | 8/10 |
| GamesRadar+ | 7/10 |
| IGN | 8.5/10 |

Award
| Publication | Award |
|---|---|
| IGN: Best of 2011 | Best Fighting Game |

Ultimate Marvel vs. Capcom 3 was released to generally favorable reviews, garnering scores of 80/100 and 79/100 from Metacritic for the PlayStation 3 and Xbox 360 versions, respectively. The PlayStation Vita version received a score of 80/100 from Metacritic.

The game received praise for addressing several gameplay issues prevalent in Marvel vs. Capcom 3: Fate of Two Worlds and refining the online experience. Daniel Maniago of G4 praised the game for its "simple, yet deep gameplay", character roster, and improved online features. 1UP.com's Neidel Crisan cited the game as a major improvement over the original. GameSpot's Maxwell McGee stated that Ultimate Marvel vs. Capcom 3 was unquestionably the superior version, highlighting the series' "unique blend of structured insanity".

A common criticism amongst reviewers for Ultimate Marvel vs. Capcom 3 was the lack of additional on-disc content beyond the expanded character roster and gameplay tweaks. While IGN's Steven Hopper praised the inclusion of new characters, he criticized the lack of new features and modes. As a result, he stated that the game's US$40 price tag was "a little hard to swallow". Tim Turi of Game Informer stated that while hardcore fans would appreciate Capcom's balancing tweaks, casual fans who already played Fate of Two Worlds and were only interested in new characters would "likely be left wanting".

Reviewers praised the PlayStation Vita version for its technical performance, despite hardware constraints, and for providing the full console version experience on a portable system. Hopper complimented the graphics, stating that the Vita port matched the visual fidelity of the console versions. Martin Robinson of Eurogamer claimed Ultimate Marvel vs. Capcom 3 was one of the Vita's "finer-looking launch games", praising its detail and faithfulness to the original. However, he criticized the addition of touchscreen controls, stating its implementation fell short of the mark laid down by Super Street Fighter IV: 3D Edition.

During the 15th Annual Interactive Achievement Awards, the Academy of Interactive Arts & Sciences nominated Ultimate Marvel vs. Capcom 3 for "Fighting Game of the Year", but lost to Mortal Kombat.

Ultimate Marvel vs. Capcom 3 reached number 19 in the United Kingdom PlayStation 3 sales chart and number 24 for the Xbox 360. The game sold approximately 600,000 units worldwide for the PlayStation 3 and Xbox 360 during the first two months of its release. By March 2015, the game had sold 1.20 million units for the PS3 and Xbox 360. As of March 2024, it has sold 3 million units across the PS3, Xbox 360, PS4, PC, and Xbox One.

== Sequel ==
Following the release of Ultimate Marvel vs. Capcom 3 for the PlayStation Vita in 2012, Marvel's new parent company, The Walt Disney Company, which acquired Marvel in 2009, chose not to renew Capcom's license with the Marvel characters, instead opting to put them in its own self-published Disney Infinity series. As a result, Capcom had to pull both Ultimate Marvel vs. Capcom 3 and Marvel vs. Capcom 2: New Age of Heroes off Xbox Live Arcade and the PlayStation Network in 2013. However, in 2016, Disney decided to cancel its Disney Infinity series, discontinue self-publishing efforts, and switch to a licensing-only model, allowing them to license their characters to third-party game developers, including Capcom. On December 3 that year Marvel vs. Capcom: Infinite was officially unveiled during Sony's PlayStation Experience event. The game was released on September 19, 2017, for PlayStation 4, Windows, and Xbox One.
