= Resident Evil 2002 =

Resident Evil 2002 may refer to:

- Resident Evil (2002 video game), a survival horror video game
- Resident Evil (2002 film), a 2002 action horror film
