= Resident Evil: The Umbrella Chronicles =

2007 video game

- North American box art
- Developers: Capcom; Cavia
- Publisher: Capcom
- Directors: Yasuhiro Seto; Hiroaki Kotake
- Producers: Masachika Kawata; Toru Takahashi
- Designers: Naoshige Kamamoto; Daichi Kurumiya
- Writers: Yasuhiro Seto; Haruo Murata
- Composers: Masafumi Takada; Jun Fukuda
- Series: Resident Evil
- Platforms: Wii, PlayStation 3
- Release: November 13, 2007: Wii; NA: November 13, 2007; JP: November 15, 2007; EU: November 30, 2007; AU: December 13, 2007; KO: June 20, 2008 PlayStation 3; NA: June 26, 2012 (PSN); EU: June 27, 2012 (PSN); JP: June 28, 2012
- Genres: Rail shooter, light gun shooter
- Modes: Single-player, multiplayer

Resident Evil: The Umbrella Chronicles (Note: Known in Japan as Biohazard: The Umbrella Chronicles (Japanese: バイオハザード アンブレラ・クロニクルズ, Hepburn: Baiohazādo Anburera Kuronikuruzu)) is an on-rails light gun shooter video game developed by Capcom and Cavia as part of the Resident Evil series. The game was released for the Wii on November 13, 2007, in North America; November 15, 2007, in Japan; and on November 30, 2007, in Europe, excluding Germany, where the game is not available due to the refusal of a USK rating and its subsequent inclusion in the index. It was followed by Resident Evil: The Darkside Chronicles. Both Chronicles games are included on the Resident Evil Chronicles HD Collection for the PlayStation 3.

The game exposes the Umbrella Corporation's meddling throughout the Resident Evil series through narration from Albert Wesker, a former Umbrella scientist, and hidden documents pertaining to the organization's secret motives and actions. The game is composed of four scenarios that recapitulate the events of Resident Evil Zero, the Resident Evil remake, and Resident Evil 3: Nemesis, as well as new material pertaining to the Umbrella Corporation's downfall.

== Gameplay ==
Jill using her taser counterattack

The Umbrella Chronicles is an on-rails shooter. Players can use their Wii remote to target and shoot like they would in a light gun shooter. The game is also compatible with the Wii Zapper. Players follow a pre-set path, shooting enemies and picking up optional weapons and health items, occasionally choosing between multiple paths. Using the analog stick or the nunchuk, players can look around in a limited manner. In some cases, the Wii Remote can be used to activate melee weapons against enemies where the camera shifts to a third-person view, or use timed button presses in certain cutscenes to evade traps and enemy attacks. Each stage is split into individual chapters and contains save checkpoints at the end of each chapter. Stars are obtained at the end of each stage, based on the player's performance, which can be used to upgrade weapons. To unlock some levels and sublevels, the player needs a certain ranking, "S" being the best. The amount of destroyed items, obtained objects, files, critical hits and clear time affects this.

Upon beating Hunk's "4th Survivor" mission, co-operative mode will be unlocked for the single-player missions. When selecting characters, an option will appear on the screen to select co-op mode. Both players will play as the same character, but each player will have their own aiming reticle.

== Plot ==
The Umbrella Chronicles encompasses several scenarios, which are based on various plot elements from the Resident Evil series. The game's first three scenarios, "Train Derailment", "The Mansion Incident", and "Raccoon's Destruction", are set within Raccoon City, or its surrounding area, in 1998. The final scenario, which is based on new material, is set in Russia, taking place in 2003. The game features nine playable characters from previous Resident Evil games: Rebecca Chambers, Billy Coen, Chris Redfield, Jill Valentine, Carlos Oliveira, Albert Wesker, Ada Wong, Richard Aiken, and Hunk.

The game's first scenario, based on the events of Resident Evil Zero, follows STARS operative Rebecca Chambers and former Marine Billy Coen as they venture through a train that eventually takes them to a derelict training facility. Within the facility, they discover they are being stalked by James Marcus, co-founder of the Umbrella Corporation and creator of the T-virus, who was resurrected by leech test-subjects. Marcus mutates into a monstrosity, but is subdued by the duo. Chambers and Coen escape as the facility self-destructs. A sub-chapter within the scenario traces Wesker's actions, now posing as the leader of STARS' Alpha team, as he attempts to escape the training facility. This chapter also introduces Sergei Vladimir and one of his bodyguard Tyrants, codenamed "IVAN".

The game then retells the events of the first Resident Evil. The scenario follows Chris Redfield and Jill Valentine, as opposed to the actual Resident Evil game, which features the two splitting up. Redfield and Valentine are forced to battle their way through a mansion full of undead residents before stumbling upon a secret Umbrella Corporation research facility in the mansion's basement. The two then discover the facility's most powerful creation, a Tyrant, and destroy it. The scenario features two different sub-chapters, which reveal Chambers' actions between Resident Evil Zero and Resident Evil, as well as Wesker's reanimation and escape after his apparent death.

The next scenario visits Raccoon City during the events of Resident Evil 3: Nemesis. Valentine returns to the city, and is paired with mercenary Carlos Oliveira, as they attempt to survive an outbreak of the T-virus. After defeating several undead citizens, Valentine and Oliveira encounter Nemesis, an upgraded Tyrant, sent to kill Valentine. They defeat Nemesis and escape Raccoon City before it is destroyed by the United States government in a desperate contingency measure. The scenario also features two sub-chapters, detailing how Ada Wong survived the events of Resident Evil 2 and Hunk's background role during the main scenario's events.

The final scenario, "Umbrella's End", is composed of new material, which trails Redfield and Valentine as they and other armed anti-bioweapon activists investigate an Umbrella Corporation stronghold in Russia. Despite their force sustaining heavy casualties, Redfield and Valentine enter the facility's inner sanctum, and encounter and destroy the Umbrella Corporation's latest creation, the T-ALOS project. The game's final sub-chapter features Wesker infiltrating the facility and recovering the Umbrella Corporation's most important files. He is confronted by his long-time nemesis, Sergei Vladimir, whom he defeats. The Umbrella Corporation's secrets are finally exposed. As a result, the U.S. government succeeds in its legal action against Umbrella's top officials.

== Development ==
The game was co-developed by Capcom and Cavia and produced by Masachika Kawata, who was behind the PlayStation 2 port of Resident Evil 4. At E3 2006, Capcom officially announced that development was already underway for an exclusive Resident Evil game for the Wii and mentioned that it would take advantage of the console's unique Wii Remote controller, giving players a new experience. Members of Capcom's Clover Studio, who created such games as Viewtiful Joe and Ōkami, were called upon to help develop the game.

A short clip of the game was shown on the Nintendo World event on November 3, 2006, where 2007 was revealed as the release date. On April 6, 2007, the official Japanese website went live containing an official teaser video. On April 13, 2007, the official Japanese website updated with a second trailer, character profiles and screenshots. A Japan-only release of the game came with a limited edition collector's Biohazard box featuring several items. Christian Svensson, Capcom's senior director of strategic planning and research, stated the game would support 480-progressive scan and 16:9 widescreen resolution. A trailer was included in the Resident Evil 4: Wii Edition, which shows the mansion from the original game and areas of Raccoon City. At its pre-E3 press conference on July 11, 2007, Nintendo announced that the Wii Zapper peripheral will be compatible with the game.

The game was initially going to be a co-op game that played similarly to Resident Evil 4. However, in an interview with Famitsu, the game's producer Masachika Kawata revealed the reason for the drastic change in gameplay: according to him, "Wii users like easiness" and that a Resident Evil 4-style game is "too complicated" for Wii users to enjoy. Masachika Kawata then elaborated that "complex operability can be an obstacle for Wii users", and that he purposefully had to "compromise to a lower difficulty level" and "reduce enthusiast-only elements".

== Release ==
Resident Evil: The Umbrella Chronicles was released in late 2007. An extensive line of tie-in products was created to promote the release of Capcom's on-rails shooter and to expand its storyline. This includes a graphic novel, several spin-off novels, and an official soundtrack release.

Biohazard: The Umbrella Chronicles ~Hōkai he no Jokyoku~ (バイオハザード アンブレラ・クロニクルズ ～崩壊への序曲～, lit. "Biohazard Umbrella Chronicles ~Overture to the Collapse~) is a series of two comics published in Akita Shoten's Weekly Shōnen Champion magazine in Japan. The first chapter was released on November 8, 2007, the second on November 15, the same day the game came out in Japan. Masaru Miyazaki wrote the plot for the manga. The illustrations were done by Naotsugu Matsueda. Its story is based on the game, taking place just before the invasion of the Russian Umbrella facility, using a fictional Russian village-like setting. Protagonists Chris Redfield and Jill Valentine are drawn into various strange occurrences in the village, which has been completely infected by the T-virus, before finding the sole survivor, a young girl named Anna, and later face off against Wesker.

Biohazard: The Umbrella Chronicles SIDE A (バイオハザード アンブレラ・クロニクルズ SIDE A) and Biohazard: The Umbrella Chronicles SIDE B (バイオハザード アンブレラ・クロニクルズ SIDE B) written by Osamu Makino are novels based on the events of Resident Evil: The Umbrella Chronicles and direct novelizations of the game. The first one was released in Japan on December 22, 2007. The second one was published in January 2008.

The Resident Evil Shot Blaster, a replacement to the Wii Zapper, was released by Capcom alongside The Umbrella Chronicles. It quickly sold out and Capcom produced a second run of the product, identical to the first, in 2009. The gun comes with a Nunchuk holster which can be detached to make the gun one-handed. The holster also rotates downward to allow easy reloading for in the game. The package includes a decal for the Wii Remote which has a picture of characters from the game, and a Nunchuk joystick grip which has the logo of the Umbrella Corporation on it.

Biohazard: The Umbrella Chronicles Original Soundtrack was composed by Masafumi Takada and Jun Fukuda from Grasshopper Manufacture featuring Ada Wong as the cover. A CD with 49 tracks called Biohazard: The Umbrella Chronicles Original Sound Track was released in Japan on December 19. It was published by Suleputer and was distributed by Sony Music Distribution for 3150 yen. The soundtrack includes a full-color booklet. Initially produced items are limited editions with special sleeve cases.

== Reception ==
Reception

Aggregate scores
| Aggregator | Score |
|---|---|
| GameRankings | 75.03% (Wii) |
| Metacritic | 75% (Wii) |

Review scores
| Publication | Score |
|---|---|
| 1Up.com | B+ |
| Edge | 7 out of 10 |
| Eurogamer | 7 out of 10 |
| Famitsu | 32 out of 40 |
| Game Informer | 8.25 out of 10 |
| GamePro | (4.25/5) |
| GameRevolution | B |
| GameSpot | 7.0 out of 10 |
| GameSpy | 3.5/5 |
| GamesRadar+ | 7 out of 10 |
| IGN | 7.9 out of 10 |
| X-Play | 4/5 |

The Wii version of The Umbrella Chronicles has received positive scores from critics. GamePro praised its unlockable secrets and satisfying gameplay, adding that "the only downside to The Umbrella Chronicles is that longevity will be an issue." GameTrailers called it "fantastic overall" and a "superb entry in the genre," praising the game for its surprising length and unlockable content, but stated that while the graphics "look good", they were sometimes "a step behind" Resident Evil 4 and added that having the game on rails actually makes it scarier, and that it's "basically a love letter" to fans of the series. IGN praised the game for having "amazingly cool" design but complained about the lack of representation from Resident Evil 2 and 4 as well as the gameplay, which they felt was too slow; on the other hand, they called the presentation "pretty impressive" and stated that "there's no denying the fun" they had with it. GameSpot praised the easy controls and the look and feel of the game, but criticized the music, stating that "it undermines the atmosphere," and that the "on-rails shooter gameplay can still feel restrictive. 1UP.com called it "a surprisingly meaty experience" and "an accessible, mostly satisfying shooter" and praised the depth and strategy offered by the gameplay, but complained about difficult headshots and stated that "it never really amounts to more than its concept".

The Wii version of the game has sold over 1.4 million copies worldwide.

== Sequel ==
On March 8, 2009, Capcom announced they would have new game announcements on March 12 at the Resident Evil 5 launch party in San Francisco. A few days earlier, Capcom's Associate Product Marketing Manager, Matt Dahlgren, said in an interview that "Nintendo Wii fans will be very happy very soon" when asked about getting more Resident Evil on Wii. On March 11, Famitsu confirmed a sequel for Umbrella Chronicles, titled Resident Evil: The Darkside Chronicles. The game, like its predecessor, has on-rails gameplay.
