= Biohazard 1 =

Biohazard 1 may refer to:

- Resident Evil (1996 video game), the PlayStation video game, later re-released on several other platforms
  - Resident Evil (2002 video game), the GameCube remake, later re-released on several other platforms
- Resident Evil (film), the first live-action film in the Resident Evil series, released in 2002
- Resident Evil: Degeneration, the first CG film in the Resident Evil series, released in 2008
- Biohazard level 1, category to distinguish the severity of biological agents
