= Resident Evil: The Mercenaries 3D =

2011 video game

- North American box art
- Developer: TOSE
- Publisher: Capcom
- Director: Kazuhisa Inoue
- Producer: Masachika Kawata
- Series: Resident Evil
- Engine: MT Framework
- Platform: Nintendo 3DS
- Release: Nintendo 3DS: JP: June 2, 2011; NA: June 28, 2011; AU: June 30, 2011; EU: July 1, 2011; Nintendo eShop: JP: December 27, 2012; NA: March 7, 2013; EU: March 28, 2013
- Genre: Third-person shooter
- Modes: Single-player, multiplayer

Resident Evil: The Mercenaries 3D (Note: Known in Japan as Biohazard: The Mercenaries 3D (Japanese: バイオハザード ザ・マーセナリーズ 3D, Hepburn: Baiohazādo Za Māsenarīzu 3D)) is a third-person shooter video game developed by TOSE and published by Capcom for the Nintendo 3DS. It was released on June 2, 2011, in Japan, June 28, 2011, in North America, June 30, 2011, in Australia, and July 1, 2011, in Europe. The game was announced at the 2010 Nintendo conference in Japan. A combination of the "Mercenaries" minigames featured in Resident Evil 4 and 5, players must defeat as many enemies as possible within a set time limit.

The theme of the game is entitled "Alone", used in TV spots, is a single album theme for the Japanese alternative rock band Kuroyume.

== Gameplay ==
The camera of the game is set behind the player, moving through real-time rendered 3D environments. Players have the option of aiming from a first-person viewpoint, although over-the-shoulder aiming is also available. Another feature is the ability to move while aiming, reloading weapons, and recovering health. Gameplay is shown on the top screen of the Nintendo 3DS, while inventory management is handled on the touch screen. Players are able to customize their characters' abilities (labeled as "Skills") and weapons load-out by obtaining "Skill Points" and "Rankings" based on their gameplay performance. The game also features alternate costumes for each character to unlock, such as a nurse outfit for Rebecca, or an American flag-motif outfit for Barry. The game includes Wi-Fi connectivity for cooperative play from players around the world, as well as new modes and characters from across the series. The game also features a short playable demo of Resident Evil: Revelations, which shows Jill Valentine investigating a desolate cruise liner inhabited by strange bio-organic weapons (BOWs).

Playable characters include Chris Redfield, Jill Valentine, Albert Wesker, Claire Redfield, Jack Krauser, Barry Burton, Rebecca Chambers and HUNK, competing in maps from Resident Evil 4 and 5.

== Development ==
Before the game's release, there was a lot of confusion over why series mainstay Leon S. Kennedy was not playable. In an interview, producer Masachika Kawata jokingly stated Leon's absence was due to his appearance in the then upcoming Resident Evil: Operation Raccoon City, but mentioned that including Leon (and other features) as future DLC was not out of the question.

== Release ==
In Europe, Nintendo of Europe handled distribution of the title.

== Reception ==
Reception

Aggregate scores
Aggregator	Score
GameRankings	67.09%
Metacritic	65/100

Review scores
Publication	Score
1Up.com	D
Destructoid	6/10
Game Informer	8/10
GameSpot	6.5/10
IGN	6.5/10
Nintendo Life	7/10
Nintendo World Report	9/10
VideoGamer.com	6/10

The game received controversy upon release when it was discovered that the game's save data could not be erased. This implied that Capcom was attempting to curb the used-game market. Although Capcom VP Christian Svensson claims this feature was not a business decision, he states that a similar feature will probably not be implemented into future games because of the controversy it has generated.

Resident Evil: The Mercenaries 3D was released to mixed reviews from critics. NGamer wrote the first review and gave the game a score of 82%. Tech Digest gave it a score of 5/5, saying, "A few key gameplay improvements over the first versions and superb visuals make this the second must-have 3DS title in as many weeks." IGN gave a less positive score of 6.5, stating while the gameplay is enjoyable, there's not enough content and that it was "designed to be an extra, not a retail release." Game Informer was very positive in their review, giving the game an 8/10 and even stated while there are some flaws, "It is the most thrilling handheld console experience I've ever had." Destructoid gave the title a 6 out of 10 rating, stating "There is fun to be had but is far too expensive for something like this." Joystiq gave the title a 2.5 out of 5 star rating, stating that "It could have been an addictive mission-based multiplayer title perfect for a portable platform, but with its limited content and quickly tiresome combat, Mercenaries 3D is little more than a fully-priced proof of concept." Nintendo World Report gave the game a 9 and said that "If you're looking for a portable-optimized intense high-score game centered around killing zombie-like enemies, this fits the bill."
