= Teppen =

- Developers: GungHo Online Entertainment; Capcom
- Publisher: GungHo Online Entertainment
- Platforms: Android, iOS
- Release: NA: July 4, 2019; EU: July 4, 2019; JP: August 8, 2019
- Genre: Digital collectible card game
- Modes: Single-player, multiplayer

Teppen (Note: Japanese: テッペン, Hepburn: Teppen) (stylized as TEPPƎN) is a free-to-play digital collectible card game developed by GungHo Online Entertainment and Capcom. It released in North America and Europe on July 4, 2019 and in Asia on August 8 for Android, and iOS. The game was initially known as Project Battle and is a crossover video game between multiple Capcom franchises.

== Plot ==
The plot of Teppen focuses on many characters from Capcom universes fighting to reach a world called the Land of Illusion, with many weird events happening in between.

== Gameplay ==
Gameplay screenshot in Teppen.

Teppen is a 1v1 video game where both players start the match with five playing cards in their hands randomly selected from their card deck, 30 health points and four mana. A mulligan system allows players to switch their five starting cards into another set of five randomly drawn cards.

Players acquire mana automatically as the match progresses, and are forced to use it in order to play cards. Any mana used will be turned in "Art Points" which is used to perform a Hero Art. The cards are split into two major categories in the game, being "Action Cards" and "Unit Cards". Unit Cards are those which can only be placed on the field with an attack line that will eventually reach the opponent and deal damage, the attack line of the Unit Cards push forward in real-time. Action Cards on the other hands are special cards which will trigger a special phase named "Active Response".

The Active Response will pause the real-time gameplay and switches it into turn-based. Players will now have a small timer to react back with another Action Card or choose for the Active Response to end. Once the latter is done, the Action Card order is played from a reverse order, this allows players to deny potential plays from the opponent.

Once players have used enough cards, the Art Points will reach a point where a Hero Art can be performed. Hero Arts are a special move in the game which plays a short cinematic of the hero in question and pauses the game entirely. Players may use the Hero Art to sabotage the opponent in a way which they perform the move shortly before an attack line reaches the opponent's side, making it difficult for the other player to block the attack. The Action Card with its Active Response mechanic may also be used this way.

Once a player reaches zero health, the match is over and they will lose. As Teppen matches have a time limit of five minutes, whichever player has the least amount of health at the end will also lose the match. There are no ties in the game, in the event of both players dealing a final blow to one another at the same time or the five minute timer ending with both players at the same amount of health, a "Double Defeat" will happen instead.

=== Playable characters ===
The playable characters are referred to as "heroes". The first eight were released at launch, while the rest are later released commonly alongside a major expansion. All heroes up to Ada Wong are unlocked by default and can be played at no additional fee. Following Ada, future characters would be released as "EX Skins", acting as alternate skins for existing characters, acting the same as the original heroes during gameplay, and would need to be unlocked through special card packs.

Hero	Franchise	Date added	Voiced by	Illustrator(s)
Ryu	Street Fighter	Included upon release	Kyle Hebert; Hiroki Takahashi	Jeremy Chong
Rathalos	Monster Hunter	Included upon release	N/A	KangJason
X	Mega Man X	Included upon release	Ted Sroka; Takahiro Sakurai	Puppeteer Lee
Chun-Li	Street Fighter	Included upon release	Ashly Burch; Fumiko Orikasa	Jeremy Chong
Morrigan Aensland	Darkstalkers	Included upon release	Siobhan Flynn; Rie Tanaka	Lasahido
Dante	Devil May Cry	Included upon release	Reuben Langdon; Toshiyuki Morikawa	Chong Fei Kang; Tam Jian Ru; Stephen Yeoh Di Zhuan; Chee Kok Seong; InHyuk Lee
Albert Wesker	Resident Evil	Included upon release	D.C. Douglas; Joji Nakata	Pablo Fernandez
Nergigante	Monster Hunter	Included upon release	N/A	BayardWu
Jill Valentine	Resident Evil	August 7, 2019	Patricia Ja Lee; Atsuko Yuya	Lasahido
Nero	Devil May Cry	October 31, 2019	Johnny Yong Bosch; Kaito Ishikawa	Chong Fei Kang; Stephen Yeoh Di Zhuan; Tam Jian Ru; Lim Chiak Lee; Saw San San; Daniel Lucas Hodge
Akuma	Street Fighter	January 7, 2020	Richard Epcar; Taketora	Jeremy Chong
Zero	Mega Man X	March 1, 2020	Johnny Yong Bosch; Ryotaro Okiayu	Chong Fei Kang; Stephen Yeoh Di Zhuan; Lim Chiak Lee; Saw San San; Daniel Lucas Hodge; Tan Yu Chi; Choo Chen Liang
Felyne	Monster Hunter	July 1, 2020	N/A	BayardWu
Amaterasu	Ōkami	October 1, 2020	N/A	Tan Yu Chi; Daniel Lucas Hodge; Stephen Yeoh Di Zhuan; Saw San San; Tam Jian Ru; Yeoh Seok Yong
Oichi	Sengoku Basara	January 5, 2021	Laura Bailey; Mamiko Noto	Lasahido
Ada Wong	Resident Evil	March 1, 2021	Courtenay Taylor; Junko Minagawa	Wong Yee Foong; Nicohans Christian; Chong Fei Kang; Saw San San; Stephen Yeoh Di Zhuan; Edward Chee Kok Seang; Tan Yu Chi; Tneh Sau Keong
Phoenix Wright	Ace Attorney	May 20, 2021	Sam Riegel; Takayuki Kondo	Henry Tanuwiharja; Chong Fei Kang; Eilene Cherie Witarsah; Saw San San; Lim Chiak Lee; Stephen Yeoh Di Zhuan; Choo Chen Liang; Tneh Sau Keong
Nina	Breath of Fire	July 1, 2021	Abby Trott; Kyoko Hikami	Stephen Yeoh Di Zhuan; Adam Wong Chee Yuen; Eilene Cherie Witarsah; Liaw Cheng Yi; Chong Fei Kang; Wong Yee Foong; Tneh Sau Keong
Sengoku Machine Armor	Sengoku Basara	January 11, 2022	Laura Bailey; Mamiko Noto	Chew Qing Yue; Chong Fei Kang; Esther Yong; Eilene Cherie Witarsah; Stephen Yeoh Di Zhuan; Wong Yiing Yi
Cammy	Street Fighter	July 5, 2022	Caitlin Glass; Miyuki Sawashiro	Tan Yu Chi; Chong Fei Kang; Wong Tuck Wai; Rocky Wong; Wong Yiing Yi
Vergil	Devil May Cry	January 12, 2023	Daniel Southworth; Hiroaki Hirata	Jeremy Chong; Suranaki; Satoru Senda
Ruiner Felicia	Darkstalkers; Monster Hunter	July 6, 2023	G.K. Bowes; Kana Asumi	Temosi
Strider Hiryu	Strider	January 5, 2024	T.J. Storm; Yūji Ueda	Temosi
Iris	Mega Man X	July 1, 2024	Unknown; Aya Endo	Temosi
Bass.EXE	Mega Man Battle Network	December 26, 2024	Matt Hill; Keiko Nemoto	Temosi
Juri	Street Fighter	July 12, 2025	Jessica Straus; Eri Kitamura	Jeremy Chong
Ref(s)				

=== Expansion List ===
Name	Franchise(s) Introduced	Date added
Core Card Pack	Darkstalkers; Devil May Cry; Mega Man X Monster Hunter; Resident Evil; Street Fighter	Included upon release
DAY OF NIGHTMARES	N/A	September 2, 2019
The Devils Awaken	N/A	October 31, 2019
The Force Seekers	N/A	January 7, 2020
Haunted by Memories	N/A	March 2, 2020
Adventures of a Tiny Hero	N/A	July 1, 2020
The Tale of Amatsu no Kuni	Ōkami; Sengoku Basara	October 1, 2020
The Battle of Amatsu no Kuni	N/A	January 5, 2021
A Dark Agenda	Strider	March 1, 2021
Ace vs. The People	Ace Attorney; Dead Rising	April 30, 2021
Dragons of War	Breath of Fire	July 1, 2021
Island of Fear	N/A	September 1, 2021
Mission of Ruin	N/A	November 5, 2021
Breath of Resistance	Red Earth	January 5, 2022
Defying the Light	N/A	March 1, 2022
Genma Onslaught	Onimusha	April 28, 2022
Super Spooky Village	Ghosts 'n Goblins	July 1, 2022
Jurassic Rampage	Dino Crisis	September 1, 2022
Operation Cannon Spike	Bionic Commando; Cannon Spike	November 1, 2022
Sigma's Invasion	CROSSxBEATS	January 5, 2023
Turnabout Festival	Haunting Ground; Oto Ranger	March 1, 2023
Demon Dogfight	N/A	April 28, 2023
30_MINUTES.EXE	Mega Man Battle Network	July 3, 2023
The Daymare Diary	N/A	September 1, 2023
THE BEAUTIFUL 8	Cyberbots; Megami Meguri	November 1, 2023
Absolute Zero	Lost Planet; Mega Man Zero	December 27, 2023
Schoolyard Royale	Rival Schools	April 1, 2024
The Desperate Jailbreak	N/A	July 1, 2024
Metro City of the Dead	N/A	October 1, 2024
Metal Suit Mafia	DmC: Devil May Cry	January 1, 2025
The Great Steam Trial	The Great Ace Attorney	April 1, 2025
World Domination	Mega Man (Original Series); Mega Man Legends; Exoprimal; Dragon's Dogma	July 1, 2025
Eternal Heroes	Captain Commando; Viewtiful Joe; Gaia Master; SonSon; Quiz Nanairo Dreams; Last Ranker; Star Gladiator; Power Stone; Ghost Trick; Under the Skin; Gaist Crusher; Asura's Wrath; E.X. Troopers	October 1, 2025

== Esports ==
Teppen World Championship is an official esports event organized by GungHo Online Entertainment. The finals of the 2019 championship was held at the Tokyo International Forum on December 21, 2019 with a prize pool of 50,000,000 Japanese yen total. Its 2020 championship was held online due to the COVID-19 pandemic, the prize pool was 5,000,000 Japanese yen.

The Teppen World Championship Series 2021 took place throughout 2021. Seven different small tournaments took place for seven different months of that year. The total prize pool was 1,000,000 Japanese yen for each individual tournament. The tournaments were sponsored by ZONe, Meiji Dairies, BookLive, 桃屋 (Momoya), UNO, BS11 and Hyperice.

In 2022, the Teppen World Championship Series 2022 was organized with a prize pool of 1,000,000 yen for the finals and an additional 100,000 yen for its second tournament for those placed between 33rd to 64th place in the qualifiers.

== Discontinuation ==
On December 22, 2025, Capcom and GungHo announced that the game will be discontinued on March 30, 2026 at 11:30 PM with an offline version to be implemented. Story Mode and Battle Tab will be available in the offline version while Ranked Match, Point Match, Free Match, Room Match, the Grand Prix options, Tourney, Missions, Quest Board, Chronicles, and Challenge will be taken out of the app.
