= Resident Evil: Revelations =

2012 video game

- Developer: Capcom
- Publisher: Capcom
- Director: Koshi Nakanishi
- Producers: Masachika Kawata; Tsukasa Takenaka
- Artists: Yoshizumi Hori; Satoshi Takamatsu
- Writer: Dai Satō
- Composers: Kota Suzuki; Takeshi Miura
- Series: Resident Evil
- Engine: MT Framework
- Platforms: Nintendo 3DS; PlayStation 3; Wii U; Windows; Xbox 360; PlayStation 4; Xbox One; Nintendo Switch
- Release: January 26, 2012: Nintendo 3DS; JP: January 26, 2012; EU: January 27, 2012; NA: February 7, 2012; PS3, Wii U, Windows, X360; NA: May 21, 2013; JP: May 23, 2013; EU: May 24, 2013; PlayStation 4, Xbox One; WW: August 29, 2017; JP: August 31, 2017; Nintendo Switch; WW: November 28, 2017
- Genre: Survival horror
- Modes: Single-player, multiplayer

Resident Evil: Revelations (Note: Known in Japan as Biohazard Revelations (Japanese: バイオハザード リベレーションズ, Hepburn: Baiohazādo Riberēshonzu)) is a 2012 survival horror game developed and published by Capcom for the Nintendo 3DS. Set shortly after Resident Evil 4, it follows counter-terrorism agents Jill Valentine and Chris Redfield as they try to uncover the truth behind a bioterrorist organization that plans to infect the Earth's oceans with a virus. In the single-player mode, the player must complete a series of episodes that involve solving puzzles and defeating enemies. In the multiplayer, players may fight their way through altered single-player scenarios.

Revelations emphasizes survival, evasion, and exploration over fast-paced combat by providing the player with limited ammunition, health, and movement speed. It was designed to bring back the content and horror of the Resident Evil roots, while at the same time trying to modernize the gameplay. Revelations was also the first game to support the Nintendo 3DS Circle Pad Pro outside Japan. The game was a moderate commercial success and received generally positive reviews from critics, who praised its spooky setting, sound direction, and presentation. Criticism was targeted at its inconsistent gameplay between episodes. The game received three nominations at the Golden Joystick Awards, including Ultimate Game of the Year, and was nominated for Handheld Game of the Year at the 16th Annual D.I.C.E. Awards.

A high-definition (HD) version was released for Windows, PlayStation 3, Wii U, and Xbox 360 in 2013, and for PlayStation 4, Xbox One, and Nintendo Switch in 2017. This version does not support the 3D capabilities of the Nintendo 3DS but features enhanced graphics and additional content, including a new difficulty setting. Across all platforms, the HD version sold more than two million copies worldwide, but was criticized for its dated graphics and uneven controls. Resident Evil: Revelations 2 was released in 2015.

== Gameplay ==
The player controls Jill Valentine from a third-person perspective on the top screen of the Nintendo 3DS. Weapons and an automap feature are displayed on the bottom screen.

Resident Evil: Revelations is a survival horror game where the player must complete a series of scenarios collected together into episodes. Although most scenarios involve the player controlling Jill Valentine aboard a ghost ship, some require the player to control other characters in different settings. To progress through a scenario, the player must complete a number of objectives, ranging from solving puzzles to defeating bosses, collecting keys that open doors to new areas, and reaching a specific point.

As a survival horror game, Revelations emphasizes survival, evasion, and exploration over fast-paced combat by providing the player with limited ammunition, health, and movement speed. The player has the ability to run, climb ladders, swim and dive underwater for a limited period of time. Up to three firearms can be carried at one time, in addition to grenades and the standard combat knife. Firearms range from handguns to shotguns, submachine guns and rifles. The game is played from a third-person perspective, but switches into a first-person or over-the-shoulder perspective—depending on which platform the game is played on—when aiming a firearm to shoot enemies.

As Jill, the player can upgrade firearms by finding special items. The player may also perform melee attacks when an enemy has been stunned after being shot at the right time. Ammunition and health items are dispersed to help players manage their resources. A device called Genesis can be used to scan and find hidden items in nearby environments. An automap feature is available to help players navigate.

In addition to the single-player campaign, Revelations features a more action-oriented mode, called Raid Mode, where one or two players may fight their way through a selection of altered scenarios from the single-player campaign. These usually feature enemies of varying power for the player to defeat. Once a scenario has been completed, the player is rewarded with experience and battle points that can be exchanged for various weapons and items at a store. Gaining experience and acquiring new equipment allow players to progress to higher and more challenging scenarios. As they progress, the player may also unlock numerous characters for use in both the single-player campaign and Raid Mode, with each character having a different set of abilities and melee attack. The game supports a StreetPass functionality that allows different players to exchange items for use in the game.

== Plot ==
Shortly after the events of Resident Evil 4 in 2004, bioterrorist organization Il Veltro launches an attack on the Mediterranean city of Terragrigia, using biological organic weapons (BOWs), in opposition to the city's development of a solar energy relay system that provides it with power via an orbital satellite. The Federal Bioterrorism Commission (FBC), an American government agency created after the destruction of Raccoon City, attempts to maintain control over the city as it is plunged into chaos, but the overwhelming attack prompts FBC director Morgan Lansdale to use the satellite to torch the city in intense solar energy. FBC agents Parker Luciani and Jessica Sherawat oversee the evacuation of the FBC's base and escape before Terragrigia is destroyed by solar rays. A year later, Parker and Jessica join an international NGO, the Bioterrorism Security Assessment Alliance (BSAA).

After BSAA agent Jill Valentine and Parker investigate a possible resurgence of BOWs near the ruins of Terragrigia, BSAA head Clive R. O'Brian reports that their colleagues Chris Redfield and Jessica went missing while investigating rumors of Veltro's possible reappearance. The pair are sent to investigate their last known position, which is an abandoned cruise ship called the Queen Zenobia. Searching the ship, the pair are tricked into believing Chris is being held in a room, and are rendered unconscious. Meanwhile, Chris and Jessica confirm that Veltro is operating at an airstrip in the mountains. O'Brian then orders the pair to track down Jill and Parker after discovering that he had given them false intel regarding their colleagues, and sends two other BSAA agents, Quint Cetcham and Keith "Grinder" Lumley, to investigate the airstrip.

After awakening in separate rooms, Jill and Parker reunite and encounter FBC agent Raymond Vester, who refuses to explain his presence on the ship. The pair also witness a video from Veltro, who reveal their plan to infect one-fifth of the Earth's oceans with the T-Abyss—a new strain of T-virus—in retaliation for the destruction of their forces in Terragrigia by the FBC. Chris and Jessica reach the Zenobia and reunite with Jill and Parker. They are confronted by Raymond disguised as a Veltro agent, but Jessica shoots him. The group separates, with Jill and Chris working together to find the laboratory used to manufacture the T-Abyss aboard the ship. In the laboratory, they neutralize the virus and are confronted by Lansdale via a video uplink, revealing that he worked with Veltro in the Terragrigia panic to increase the FBC's funding and international influence. Meanwhile, Parker turns his gun on Jessica after he secretly learned from Raymond that she is a mole for the FBC, prompting her to trigger the ship's self-destruct sequence and escape.

Although Jill and Chris escape the ship before its destruction, Parker falls off a catwalk. O'Brian reveals that he had orchestrated the events they had been through to uncover evidence of Lansdale's involvement in the attack on Terragrigia. Data recovered by Keith and Quint reveals that Lansdale sank a sister ship within the ruins of Terragrigia to eliminate any incriminating evidence. Lansdale arrests O'Brian, while Jill and Chris go to the sister ship, where they find Veltro's leader Jack Norman and learn he survived the solar ray blast by injecting himself with T-Abyss, plotting to expose Lansdale by releasing video footage of his meetings with Veltro, but had grown delusional. The pair defeat Norman and take his video evidence to broadcast. As a result, O'Brian is released, while Lansdale is taken into custody and the FBC is dissolved. In an epilogue, it is revealed that Parker is found a month later in Malta, after Raymond was found to have faked his death and saved him from the ship's destruction and O'Brian voluntarily resigns as BSAA director to save the organization. The epilogue ends with Chris and Jill about to infiltrate the mansion of Umbrella founder Oswell E. Spencer, leading into the Resident Evil 5 prequel DLC "Lost in Nightmares." In a post-credits scene, Raymond gives Jessica a sample of the T-Abyss at a cafe. When asked why he saved Parker, he responds, "I have my reasons."

== Development ==
A cruise ship was chosen as the main setting of the game due to its claustrophobic corridors and isolation in the middle of the ocean. This concept art depicts Jill navigating the ship's corridors.

Revelations was developed by Capcom and directed by Koshi Nakanishi, who had worked as a game designer for Resident Evil 5. The game was developed simultaneously with Resident Evil: The Mercenaries 3D and the team in charge of the project was not involved in the production of Resident Evil 6. The team chose to develop for the Nintendo 3DS because they felt that its 3D capabilities could produce a "tense, scary experience with a realistic atmosphere that could make players feel like there could be something lurking around every corner." They decided to use an episodic structure with short and varied chapters to make it suitable for playing on a handheld game console. The Raid Mode was designed so that players could "bring the game to their friend's house and enjoy it with friends face to face, as they talk".

The developer's main goal was to bring back the content and horror of the Resident Evil roots, while at the same time trying to modernize the gameplay. A cruise ship was chosen as the main setting because it could provide claustrophobic corridors and make the player helpless in the middle of the ocean. The ship's main hall was inspired by the Palais Garnier opera house in Paris. Enemies were designed to moan and emit terrifying sounds before being spotted by the player. Nakanishi remarked that this mechanic allows players to determine which enemies are coming for them from their sound alone. Although zombies are the main enemies in the first Resident Evil games, the team opted to create "water-logged" creatures with deformed structures for Revelations to widen the variety of enemies of the franchise.

Revelations runs on a ported and downsized version of Capcom's proprietary MT Framework engine, which was originally designed for high-definition (HD) games such as Devil May Cry 4 and Lost Planet 2. Capcom's previous experience with The Mercenaries 3D helped the development team improve the technical and graphical aspects. According to Nakanishi, "It was thanks to the tremendous efforts of our technical team that we were able to get console-quality graphics from portable hardware." Some techniques were used to reduce performance costs. For example, the Genesis scanner reduces the on-screen display complexity, while some creatures were designed to have simplistic skeletal physics and no HD textures. A pair of glasses for Jill was originally suggested as the Genesis scanner.

Unlike in previous Resident Evil games, the developers designed Revelations so that the player could move and shoot at the same time. Producer Masachika Kawata explained that the reason why the mechanic was not adopted earlier was that it would make the game too fast for a survival horror game. Nevertheless, the developers balanced the gameplay by slowing down the speed of the player movement and by making enemies move in a complex and spooky manner, "as if they're trying to avoid your attack." The developers decided to support the Circle Pad Pro accessory as soon as it was conceived because improving the controls was a priority.

In December 2010, it was reported that only 20% of the game was complete. Numerous features were not included in the final product due to time and budget constraints. The developers originally planned to add a special weapon designed to be used underwater and acquired from Chris at the end of the eighth episode, but the plot changed during development and the team had to discard it. Additionally, the land in the distance that can be seen from the ship in the first episode was originally going to be the setting of the last episode, where Jill would have found something from her past.

== Marketing and release ==
Revelations was announced at E3 2010 in June 2010, while a playable demonstration was showcased at the Nintendo World 2011 event in January 2011. A short demo, allowing players to control Jill on the cruise ship for a brief period, was included with the release of The Mercenaries 3D in the following months. In June 2011, Revelations was presented at E3 2011, receiving a nomination for Best 3DS Game at the Best of E3 2011 awards by IGN. The publication later listed it as one of the 30 most anticipated games of 2012. A second demo was made available for download from the Nintendo eShop service in North America and Europe in January 2012. Shortly before Revelations was released, Capcom shipped the first North American copies with the title misspelled as "Revelaitons" on the spine. Capcom offered buyers the option to replace the cover with a corrected version.

Revelations was released in Japan on January 26, 2012, in Europe on January 27, 2012, and in North America on February 7, 2012. It was the first Nintendo 3DS game to support the Circle Pad Pro outside Japan. A bundle containing the accessory and the game was exclusively released in Europe. In Europe and Australia, Nintendo handled distribution sales and marketing.

According to Media Create, the game sold 296,040 copies in Japan in 2012. In the United States, it was among the 25 best-selling video games of February 2012 and sold 122,000 units in March 2012. Although sales of Revelations were considered successful for a Nintendo 3DS game, Capcom wanted it to sell "a little more" given the large development costs.

== Reception ==
Reception (3DS)

Aggregate score
Aggregator	Score
Metacritic	82/100

Review scores
Publication	Score
Edge	6/10
Eurogamer	8/10
Famitsu	39/40
G4	3/5
Game Informer	9/10
GameRevolution	4.5/5
GameSpot	8.5/10
GameTrailers	9.0/10
IGN	8.5/10

Revelations received "generally favorable reviews" from critics, according to the review aggregator website Metacritic. GameSpot described it as "a thoroughly successful crossbreeding of old-school chills and new-school action", highlighting its tense atmosphere and slow-paced combat. In a positive review, GameRevolution praised its spooky setting and sound direction, stating that the game can be more effective than old-school Resident Evil games. IGN reviewer Richard George considered Revelations "a great handheld game, one that not only pushes the boundaries and standards of the Nintendo 3DS but one that recaptures a long-forgotten spirit of a classic franchise." However, he criticised the scenarios not involving the cruise ship setting and remarked that the constant alterations of characters and gameplay between scenarios hold the game "back from true greatness", concluding that it "doesn't understand its strengths".

Several critics declared the graphics some of the best on the Nintendo 3DS. Eurogamer praised the environments for their lighting and particle effects, while GameSpot credited the highly detailed character models, especially those of Jill and certain monsters. The sound design was also highlighted, with IGN saying that "Capcom has mastered the ability to play up a soundtrack when appropriate, sometimes completely cutting to isolated noises in order to focus a player on something truly haunting." GameRevolution stated similar pros, noting that the game is best experienced when played in the dark and with headphones on. Game Informer praised the story for its episodic structure and pacing, but admitted that BSAA agents Quint and Keith are the worst characters in the series' history. The fact that the game supports the Circle Pad Pro was seen as a valuable feature, as it gives players the ability to move, shoot and control the camera at the same time.

In a mixed review, Edge felt that Revelations features the best and worst of the series' past and present, and criticised its episodic structure for breaking the engrossing exploration. GameSpot praised the gameplay for its stop-and-shoot action and use of the Genesis scanner, saying that it "nicely complements the resource scavenging that underpins your survival." Game Informer felt that the weapon customization allows for different playstyles, but criticised the lack of enemy variety in comparison to other games in the series. Jonathan Deesing of G4 praised the exploration of the cruise ship setting, comparing it favorably to Super Metroid. However, he criticised the controls for being frustrating and the computer-controlled companions for being useless. Similarly, IGN remarked that the fact that the player is accompanied by a partner makes the game less scary. The Raid Mode was seen as a valuable addition. Eurogamer stated that the mode "is a great concept for 3DS" and the game "executes it with conviction" due to its unlockable features, challenge, and replayability.

=== Accolades ===
Revelations received multiple year-end nominations from certain publications and award ceremonies. At the 2012 Golden Joystick Awards, it received nominations in the Best Handheld Game, Ultimate Game of the Year, and Top Gaming Moment categories. At the 16th Annual D.I.C.E. Awards, the Academy of Interactive Arts & Sciences nominated Revelations for Handheld Game of the Year, but ultimately lost to Paper Mario: Sticker Star. At the NAVGTR Awards, the game was nominated in the Graphics, Technical and Game, Franchise Adventure categories, losing to Far Cry 3 and Assassin's Creed III, respectively. GameSpot editors nominated Revelations for Handheld Game of the Year at their Best of 2012 Awards, while IGN editors awarded it Best 3DS/DS Graphics, and nominated it in the Best 3DS/DS Sound, Best 3DS/DS Story, and Best 3DS/DS Game categories. Pocket Gamer awarded the game Best Action/Arcade Game and 3DS/DS Game of the Year.

== HD version ==
An HD version of Revelations, also referred to as the "Unveiled Edition", was released for Microsoft Windows, PlayStation 3, Wii U, and Xbox 360 in North America on May 21, 2013, and in Europe on May 24, 2013. It features enhanced HD graphics and lighting, additional Raid Mode content such as weapons and characters, and a new difficulty mode which remixes enemy and item placement in the single-player campaign. The additional graphical fidelity on home consoles also allowed developers to increase the level of details on enemies. Although the HD version does not support the 3D capabilities of the Nintendo 3DS, the Wii U version supports Miiverse functionality and offers additional features for the Wii U GamePad, including dual screen gameplay and Off-TV Play. The HD version was released for PlayStation 4 and Xbox One in Japan on August 31, 2017, and in North America and Europe on August 29, 2017. A Nintendo Switch version was released on November 28, 2017.

Critical reception towards the HD version was not as positive. IGN criticised it for its dated graphics and uneven controls, saying that it is "simply out of its element", while Eurogamer criticised the slow character movement, but acknowledged that the game stands out compared to earlier entries in the main Resident Evil series. In 2016, readers of the Japanese video game magazine Famitsu selected Revelations as the sixth most memorable game for PlayStation 3. Upon release, the HD version topped the UK charts for the week ending May 25, 2013. As of March 2019, the PlayStation 3, Xbox 360, Wii U, and Microsoft Windows versions combined had sold 1.9 million copies worldwide. As of February 2018, the PlayStation 4, Xbox One, and Nintendo Switch versions combined had sold 500,000 copies. A sequel, Resident Evil: Revelations 2, was released in 2015.
