= Chris Redfield =

Resident Evil character

- Chris Redfield in Resident Evil Village (2021)
- First appearance: Resident Evil (1996)
- Created by: Shinji Mikami; Isao Ohishi
- Designed by: Jun Takeuchi; Isao Ohishi
- Portrayed by: Various: Charlie Kraslavsky (Resident Evil live-action cutscenes) Wentworth Miller (Afterlife) Geordie Dandy (Resident Evil 7, Village) Robbie Amell (Welcome to Raccoon City)
- Voiced by: English: Scott McCulloch (Resident Evil) Michael Filipowich (Code: Veronica); Joe Whyte (Resident Evil remake); Kevin Dorman (The Umbrella Chronicles, Vendetta, Death Island); Roger Craig Smith (Resident Evil 5 and 6, The Darkside Chronicles, Marvel vs. Capcom series, The Mercenaries 3D, Revelations); David Vaughn (Resident Evil 7); Jeff Schine (Village) Bryce Buckley (State of Survival); Japanese: Hiroki Tōchi (Afterlife, Marvel vs. Capcom 3, Ultimate Marvel vs. Capcom 3, Revelations, Project X Zone series, Resident Evil 6 and 7, Resident Evil HD Remaster, Revelations 2, Vendetta, Village, Death Island); Subaru Kimura (Welcome to Raccoon City)
- Motion capture: Various: Tetsuya Matsui (Resident Evil remake) Reuben Langdon (Resident Evil 5 and 6, Vendetta); Geordie Dandy (Resident Evil 7, Village)

In-universe information
- Family: Claire Redfield (sister)
- Nationality: American

Chris Redfield (Note: Japanese: クリス・レッドフィールド, Hepburn: Kurisu Reddofīrudo) is a character in Resident Evil (Biohazard in Japan), a survival horror series created by the Japanese company Capcom. He was introduced as one of the two playable characters of the original Resident Evil (1996), alongside his partner Jill Valentine, as a member of the Raccoon Police Department's Special Tactics and Rescue Service (S.T.A.R.S.) unit. Chris and Jill fight against the Umbrella Corporation, a pharmaceutical company whose bioterrorism creates zombies and other bio-organic weapons. Later, the pair became founding members of the United Nations' Bioterrorism Security Assessment Alliance (BSAA).

Chris is the protagonist in several Resident Evil games, novels, and films, and has also appeared in other game franchises, including Marvel vs. Capcom, Project X Zone, and Dead by Daylight. In later games, such as Resident Evil 7: Biohazard (2017) and Resident Evil Village (2021), his features were based on New Zealand model Geordie Dandy. Several actors have portrayed Chris, including Wentworth Miller and Robbie Amell in the Resident Evil live-action films.

Critics have been polarized in their critiques of the character, with a focus on the frequent modifications and inconsistency in his design. Several publications have referred to Chris as one of the sexiest video game characters. Some critics have referred to a scene of his punching a boulder in Resident Evil 5 (2009), which became an internet meme, as one of the most memorable within the Resident Evil series.

== Concept and design ==
Chris was introduced as one of the two playable protagonists, alongside his partner Jill Valentine, in Capcom's 1996 survival horror video game Resident Evil. He was created by director Shinji Mikami and designer Isao Ohishi. Designer Hideki Kamiya described Chris as a "blunt, tough-guy type", admitting that he was a fan of this archetype. Of white American descent, Chris served in the United States Air Force and later joined the Special Tactics and Rescue Service (S.T.A.R.S.), a special operations unit of the Raccoon Police Department. Although their storylines progress similarly, the gameplay differs for Jill and Chris; Chris cannot carry as many items in his inventory, but he can run quicker and withstand more damage.

Chris continued to be redesigned over the course of the series. In Resident Evil 5 (2009), modeler Yosuke Yamagata said that they "made a new design that retained their signature color—green for Chris, blue for Jill—to carry over the same look from the past". The character's facial features are mainly based on the visuals in the 2002 remake of Resident Evil, with various details added to arrive at a "realistic structure". The game features Chris as a protagonist; designers opted to focus on how the character had aged since the original game. His increased muscle mass was to show that he had trained intensely to fight the series' powerful villain, Albert Wesker, bare-handed. Resident Evil 5's producer Jun Takeuchi said that the series' fans want a video game featuring both Leon S. Kennedy and Chris as the protagonists at the same time, due to their popularity. Takeuchi opined that it would be "pretty dramatic" if the two characters never met before the series ended; the meeting happened in Resident Evil 6 (2012), where Chris has a slightly disheveled look due to his alcoholism and post-traumatic amnesia. Character designer Tsutomu Kawade noted that the team was aware of Chris' powerful arms being his most distinctive feature. Their design thus accentuated his arms, with attire in blue-tinted green that continued his concept color.

For Resident Evil 7: Biohazard (2017), Takeuchi said Chris was being proposed as the main character at that time and had to be written as the hero since his last appearance. However, Takeuchi realized that making a Resident Evil game was not the same as creating Chris into a hero character. According to producer Masachika Kawata, the main playable character would be "totally new" rather than a "macho superhero" like Chris from Resident Evil 5. Director Kōshi Nakanishi thought that Chris' appearance in Resident Evil 6 would be "not suitable for Resident Evil 7's game engine or aesthetic". Nakanishi reasoned that "[a]lthough it is a fairly realistic impression, even if it mixes with the character of 7, it seems that a sense of incongruity will come out." Producers wanted to give the character a more "photorealistic depiction" with an entirely new design. Nakanishi felt that if Chris looked the same as in previous titles, players would get a sense of "incongruity", although commentators and players held that the changes made the character unrecognizable.

Chris appears as a major supporting character in Resident Evil Village (2021); however, he is instead shown as more nefarious in the game's trailers due to killing protagonist Ethan Winters' wife Mia Winters and kidnapping his daughter Rosemary Winters, which surprised longtime fans. Chris' actions served as a major mystery to the game before its release, which director Morimasa Sato felt was an opportunity to showcase the character's progression to fans who were already familiar with him. His appearance was again redesigned, with a new outfit incorporating a coat.

=== Voice-over and live-action actors ===
In the original Resident Evil, which uses live-action cinematics, Chris is played by Charlie Kraslavsky. Scott McCulloch voiced Chris in the original Resident Evil; Michael Filipowich voiced him in Resident Evil – Code: Veronica; Joe Whyte in the 2002 remake of Resident Evil; Kevin Dorman in Resident Evil: The Umbrella Chronicles, Resident Evil: Vendetta, and Resident Evil: Death Island; and Roger Craig Smith in Resident Evil 5 and Resident Evil 6. David Vaughn voiced him in Resident Evil 7, while Jeff Schine took the role in Resident Evil: Village. In Japanese, Subaru Kimura voiced Chris in Resident Evil: Welcome to Raccoon City.

Reuben Langdon performed Chris' motion capture in Resident Evil 5 and Resident Evil 6, while Geordie Dandy acted as Chris for motion capture in Resident Evil 7 and Village. Wentworth Miller portrayed him in Resident Evil: Afterlife, while Robbie Amell played him in Resident Evil: Welcome to Raccoon City.

== Appearances ==
=== In the Resident Evil series ===
Resident Evil games featuring Chris Redfield
1996	Resident Evil
1997	Resident Evil: Director's Cut
1998–1999
2000	Resident Evil – Code: Veronica
2001
2002	Resident Evil (remake)
2003–2006
2007	Resident Evil: The Umbrella Chronicles
2008
2009	Resident Evil 5
2009	Resident Evil: The Darkside Chronicles
2010
2011	Resident Evil: The Mercenaries 3D
2012	Resident Evil: Revelations
2012	Resident Evil 6
2013–2016
2017	Resident Evil 7: Biohazard
2018–2020
2021	Resident Evil Village
2022	Resident Evil Re:Verse
2023–2026
2027	Resident Evil Veronica (remake)

Every game in the series is set in the fictional American metropolitan area of Raccoon City until its destruction at the end of Resident Evil 3: Nemesis. Subsequent games featuring Chris take place on an international scale, namely in Russia, Antarctica, China, Louisiana, Romania, Africa, and the Mediterranean Sea. The original game is set in July 1998 in a mansion on the outskirts of Raccoon City, which Chris and his team enter while searching for lost colleagues. Working with fellow S.T.A.R.S. member Rebecca Chambers, Chris discovers the property is a façade for a biological warfare laboratory operated by the Umbrella Corporation, and its undead occupants are the scientists who developed the T-virus mutagen. His commander, Albert Wesker, is revealed to be a double agent for Umbrella. Chris and Jill are among the five survivors of the incident, who form a strong friendship and become passionate opponents of bioterrorism.

Chris did not appear in Resident Evil 2 (1998), as the production team used new protagonists (Leon S. Kennedy and Claire Redfield) to preserve the original game's horror elements. Mikami believed Chris and Jill would be too experienced to be scared by the events in the sequel. Set three months after the events of Resident Evil 2, Resident Evil – Code: Veronica (2000) sees Chris return as the protagonist in the second half of the game. He attempts to rescue his younger sister, Claire, from the Umbrella Corporation's research facilities on Rockfort Island, a fictional island in the South Pacific Ocean. Upon discovering she is in Antarctica, Chris is briefly confronted by Wesker, who is revealed to have survived the events of the first game and also to have gained enhanced strength, speed, and agility. Eventually, Chris defeats antagonist Alexia Ashford and escapes with Claire before the Antarctic facility self-destructs. After that, the siblings vow to put an end to the Umbrella Corporation.

The Umbrella Chronicles occurs in 2003, when Chris and Jill join a private organization to expose Umbrella's biological warfare activities and ultimately destroy Umbrella's only remaining research facility. (Note: Albert Wesker: "It was the year 2003. Umbrella had a base of operations in Russia, where they were working on new B.O.W. (bio-organic weapons). They were preparing to arm the unstable regions of the world with their bio weaponry. Chris and Jill had joined a regional biohazard containment unit and had heard rumors about this nightmarish facility.") After the fall of the corporation, the pair become founding members of the United Nations' Bioterrorism Security Assessment Alliance (BSAA). In Revelations – set two years later – Jill and her new partner Parker Luciani are sent on a mission to rescue Chris, who is allegedly being held hostage on a ghost ship in the Mediterranean. Jill and Chris then unravel a political conspiracy involving an earlier mutagenic outbreak and a botched investigation by a rival agency.

Resident Evil 5 takes place in 2009 in the fictional African town of Kijuju, where terrorists are turning local residents into zombies. Chris is the protagonist and is sent to Africa by the BSAA. In the game, he investigates while looking for Jill, who is missing and declared dead. Over the course of the investigation, he finds that she has been taken hostage by Wesker, who used her as a test subject in his biological experiments. Accompanying Chris is his new partner, Sheva Alomar. Working together, the two manage to find and free Jill, and ultimately defeat and destroy Wesker, who was planning to spread the Uroboros virus across the world.

In Resident Evil 6 (2012), Chris leads a squad of BSAA soldiers to investigate a bioterrorism attack in Edonia, a fictional country in Eastern Europe. Ambushed by Carla Radames, posing as Ada Wong, they suffer severe casualties, with Chris and Piers Nivans the only survivors. They travel to China to investigate bio-terror activity and find themselves in another C-virus outbreak. While attempting to work with Jake Muller, the illegitimate son of Albert Wesker, who possesses the antibodies needed to stop the outbreak, Chris and Piers encounter Haos, a powerful bioweapon. Piers is grievously injured during the battle and injects himself with the C-virus to gain superhuman powers. He saves Chris, but sacrifices himself to ensure Haos is destroyed.

At the end of Resident Evil 7: Biohazard (2017), a man identifying as "Redfield" arrives to rescue Ethan. While the credits refer to the character as Chris Redfield, the helicopter he arrives in is branded with the Umbrella Corporation logo. This initially caused people to question the person's identity; Capcom later confirmed him to be Chris, albeit with a noticeable change in appearance. (Note: "Response to Chris Redfield's appearance in the DLC from Resident Evil fans has been mixed. The biggest point of contention appears to be his character design, with some fans sounding skeptical that it's actually Chris. In their defense, he looks remarkably different in Resident Evil 7: Biohazard than he did in Resident Evil 5 and Resident Evil 6, in which he was considerably beefier.") Chris appeared in the downloadable content campaign Not a Hero. This subchapter focuses on Chris and his team attempting to apprehend antagonist Lucas Baker, and although he fails to save his squad, he confronts and kills Lucas.

Chris returned for the eighth main installment in the series, titled Resident Evil Village (2021). During the events of Village, Chris and his Hound Wolf squad learn that antagonist Mother Miranda is capable of shape-shifting and had posed as Mia. They promptly shoot her to protect Ethan and the Winters' daughter Rosemary, though these efforts are foiled. After revealing the nature of his mission to Ethan, Chris saves the real Mia, learns Miranda's connection to the late Oswell E. Spencer – the founder of the Umbrella Corporation – and helps plant a bomb to destroy the infested village. During extraction, a dying Ethan gives the recently rescued Rosemary to Chris before sacrificing himself to ensure the village's destruction. Mia and Rosemary are rescued, and Chris and his team head to the BSAA's European headquarters to demand explanations for the BSAA's using bio-organic weapons as frontline soldiers.

=== Other appearances ===
Chris features in several Resident Evil films. In the rejected Resident Evil film script written by George A. Romero in 1998, Chris is a Native American civilian and ultimately one of the few survivors. In director Paul W. S. Anderson's live-action Resident Evil film series, Chris appears in Resident Evil: Afterlife (2010), where he is found trapped in a maximum security cell in Los Angeles. Wentworth Miller said that he requested that the filmmakers put together a montage of noteworthy video-game scenes that elaborated on Chris' experiences and background, as this would help him understand the character. He did not appear in the final film, Resident Evil: The Final Chapter (2016), apparently dying offscreen. According to actress Milla Jovovich, Chris was excluded because there were too many other Resident Evil characters. In the reboot film Resident Evil: Welcome to Raccoon City (2021), Chris is played by Robbie Amell. Chris also appears in the animated adult Resident Evil films, which, unlike the live-action films, are continuations of the games. Chris is one of the main characters in Resident Evil: Vendetta (2017). He is asking Rebecca and Leon for assistance in preventing a psychopath from spreading "The Trigger Virus" throughout New York City. Chris returns in the sequel, Resident Evil: Death Island (2023). He is a BSAA agent who investigates an outbreak of zombies in San Francisco caused by a new strain of virus.

Chris is a playable character in several non-canonical Resident Evil games. The character appears in a number of Resident Evil mobile games. He appears in three games in the Marvel vs. Capcom franchise and the crossover tactical role-playing game Project X Zone 2 (2015). He is a playable character in the digital collectible card game Teppen (2019) and State of Survival (2019). He is an alternate skin in the asymmetric online multiplayer game Dead by Daylight (2016), Tom Clancy's The Division 2 (2019), and in the Dead Rising Deluxe Remaster (2024) for Frank West. He has a non-playable cameo in the Fortnite Battle Royale (2017), Nintendo crossover video game Super Smash Bros. Ultimate (2018) as one of the 'Spirit' power-ups, Dying Light 2 (2022), and a robot dressed as Chris in Astro's Playroom (2020) and Astro Bot (2024).

Chris features in novels of the films and games and plays a main role in the third novel in a series by S. D. Perry, Resident Evil: City of the Dead (1999). Additionally, he makes an appearance in the prequel manga for Resident Evil 6, which describes Chris' activities prior to the events of that game. Several comic books based on the games were released, and he is a character in Bandai's Resident Evil Deck Building Card Game (2011) and Steamforged Games' Resident Evil 3: The Board Game (2021). The character was featured in a Resident Evil–themed attraction at Universal Studios Japan's Halloween Horror Nights. Merchandise featuring Chris includes outfits, perfumes, gun replicas, watches, and figurines.

== Critical reception ==
Chris' appearance in Resident Evil 5 (left) was carried forward into its sequel, Resident Evil 6 (center). His redesigned appearance for Resident Evil 7 (right) confused commentators and players, who found the character to be unrecognizable.

Chris has received criticism for inconsistent design and characteristics. Several game publications have noted the character's lack of consistent visual design throughout the Resident Evil franchise. Other critics have suggested that Chris used steroids. Polygon's Cass Marshall noted his variations in body mass throughout the games repeatedly changing from lean to muscular and back again. GameSpy compared his design in Resident Evil 5 and said that "he look[s] a little bit like a cross between Colin Farrell and Hugh Jackman". Several Kotaku writers have referred to Chris as one of the worst of the Resident Evil heroes, calling him "bland" and "boring", and criticizing the majority of his redesigns, while Ian Walker from Kotaku compared his appearances in Resident Evil 7 and Resident Evil Village as "transition[ing] from global bio-terrorism agent to [...] someone's henchman in a British crime comedy written and directed by Guy Ritchie."

Chris has also been praised by gaming journalists. He has been named by IGN, Inverse, and in a Famitsu reader survey as one of the popular Resident Evil characters. His professional relationship with Jill was celebrated for its basis in loyalty rather than romance. Noting previous criticism for being a "one-dimensional" character, PC Gamer's Andy Kelly praised Chris as "finally a person" in Village, opining that, as a result of the game's design, he has been "given some depth".

Chris has often been recognized for his sex appeal, particularly since his more muscular appearance debuted in Resident Evil 5. Some critics have described him as one of the sexiest video game characters. Video game critic Veerender Singh Jubbal stated in a Kotaku interview that Chris, as he appears in Resident Evil 5, "allowed [him] to understand [his] bisexuality" better; noting that his design was "different than previous iterations", Jubbal described Chris as a "large muscle-bound hunk [and] something [he] was attracted to".

Near the climax of Resident Evil 5, Chris punches a large boulder until it falls into lava. The scene became recognized as one of the most memorable within the Resident Evil series, largely due to its ridiculousness. The scene inspired fans to create internet memes that highlighted Chris' masculinity and strength. Wes Fenlon of PC Gamer said that Chris punching a boulder inside an active volcano "gave us what is truly one of the greatest moments in the history of video games" and "as a quick time event. It is perfect." In Resident Evil Village, antagonist Karl Heisenberg calls Chris a "boulder-punching asshole" during his boss fight, a reference to the aforementioned scene. In Pragmata (2026), an unclaimed website, aweskerproduction.com, referenced in the billboards, was filled with Resident Evil memes, including Chris' mid-boulder punch after a Russian player capitalized it.
