= Albert Wesker =

Resident Evil character

- Resident Evil character
- Albert Wesker in Resident Evil 5 (2009)
- First appearance: Resident Evil (1996)
- Created by: Shinji Mikami; Isao Ohishi
- Designed by: Jun Takeuchi; Kenichi Iwao
- Portrayed by: Various: Eric Pirius (Resident Evil live-action cutscenes) Jason O'Mara (Extinction) Shawn Roberts (Afterlife, Retribution, The Final Chapter) Tom Hopper (Welcome to Raccoon City) Lance Reddick (TV series)
- Voiced by: English: Pablo Kuntz (Resident Evil) Richard Waugh (Code: Veronica, Resident Evil Zero and 4, Wesker's Report) Peter Jessop (Resident Evil remake) D. C. Douglas (The Umbrella Chronicles, Resident Evil 5, The Darkside Chronicles, Marvel vs. Capcom 3, Ultimate Marvel vs. Capcom 3, The Mercenaries 3D, Revelations 2, Resident Evil Zero HD Remaster (Wesker Mode only), Umbrella Corps, Teppen) Connor Fogarty (Dead by Daylight) Craig Burnatowski (Resident Evil 4 remake); Japanese: Fumihiko Tachiki (Extinction, Afterlife, Retribution, The Final Chapter) Jōji Nakata (Marvel vs. Capcom 3, Ultimate Marvel vs. Capcom 3, Resident Evil HD Remaster, Revelations 2, Resident Evil Zero HD Remaster, Teppen, Resident Evil 4 remake) Satoshi Hino (Welcome to Raccoon City)
- Motion capture: Various: Junichi Kawamoto (Resident Evil remake) Ken Lally (Resident Evil 5) Craig Burnatowski (Resident Evil 4 remake)

In-universe information
- Children: Jake Muller
- Nationality: American

Albert Wesker (Note: Japanese: アルバート・ウェスカー, Hepburn: Arubāto Wesukā) is a character created by the Japanese game designers Jun Takeuchi and Isao Ohishi. He is one of the main antagonists of Capcom's Resident Evil video game franchise. Wesker is a virologist for the Umbrella Corporation, a pharmaceutical company that secretly develops biological weapons. Initially focused on advancing human evolution, he becomes a bioterrorist obsessed with eradicating humanity. His presence is mostly limited to cutscenes where he manipulates story events from the background.

Wesker first appears in the original Resident Evil (1996), where he was conceived as a cyborg police officer, before being redeveloped by the writer Kenichi Iwao, who envisioned him as arrogant, intelligent, and unsympathetic. Wesker is initially depicted as the captain of the Raccoon Police Department special forces unit, before his villainy is revealed in a plot twist. He seemingly dies in the finale, but returns in Resident Evil – Code: Veronica (2000), having gained superhuman abilities. In Resident Evil 5 (2009), Wesker, appearing as the final boss, attempts to trigger an extinction event but is killed by Chris Redfield and Sheva Alomar. His plans continue to drive the overarching Resident Evil narrative, causing many of the disasters in subsequent games.

Outside of the Resident Evil games, Wesker appears in novelizations and films, and has also appeared in other game franchises, including Marvel vs. Capcom, Teppen, and Dead by Daylight. Jouji Nakata has voiced Wesker in Japanese since the original Resident Evil. In English, Wesker was first voiced by Pablo Kuntz, while D. C. Douglas has voiced him in most of his other appearances. Several actors have portrayed Wesker, including Jason O'Mara, Shawn Roberts, Tom Hopper, and Lance Reddick, in the live-action Resident Evil films and television series.

Wesker has received mostly positive reviews from video game publications. Critics have called him one of the most memorable video game villains, highlighting his connection to eugenics, and praised his death scene. Some publications have criticized his character as lacking depth. Reddick's portrayal of Wesker in Netflix's series was lauded by critics.

== Concept and design ==
"I imagined that he was in a special forces setting. Unmarried with no siblings, but was born into an ordinary American middle-class family. However, he was already too formed and believed the world to be worthless. He was a genius with scant feelings. He enjoyed ordinary family vacations, even displayed excellent grades in sport, but his heart was always cold and he was acting to blend himself into society. He was a clear-headed but tragic individual lacking human emotions. The only way he could live was to self-affirm his intense elitism."

— Kenichi Iwao on designing Wesker's character, Crimson-Head.com

Albert Wesker is an American of European descent. He was created by director Shinji Mikami and designer Isao Ohishi. The main characters were originally intended to be cyborg police officers, until writer Kenichi Iwao discarded the idea and completely redesigned the characters and the game's backstory. He envisioned Wesker as a former special forces member who possessed exceptional intelligence and physical prowess, with a cold demeanor that matched his egotistical mindset. His co-workers suggested making the character a traitor who betrays the protagonist. The game's designers ultimately developed Wesker into the commander of the protagonists' elite police task force, who is secretly employed as a virologist for the Umbrella Corporation. His drive to develop viral agents and engineer the ultimate lifeform is a central plotline in the Resident Evil series. Wesker is depicted as a white male with blonde hair in the video games and movies. Designer Jun Takeuchi helped create Wesker's in-game character model in the first Resident Evil. He suggested giving Wesker a pair of black sunglasses to help differentiate him from the other characters, which became a staple of his appearance throughout the series.

During the finale of Resident Evil 5, Wesker fully sheds his human appearance when he infects himself with the Uroboros virus, a volatile and mutagenic viral agent. The Uroboros virus grants him more strength while also transforming his arms into tentacles that allow him to absorb and wield metallic objects as weapons. The early concept sketches of his Uroboros mutation differed significantly from the final version. In the initial design, his combat style would have relied solely on his mental powers to manipulate Uroboros. This concept was shaped by the one-on-one battle between Wesker and Chris Redfield, without a co-op partner. However, with the addition of Sheva Alomar as a co-op partner, adjustments were made to bolster Wesker's abilities and provide him with additional makeshift weaponry for the final boss battle. Following Wesker's demise, longtime series producer Masachika Kawata stated that there was no possibility of the character returning.

=== Voice-over and live-action actors ===
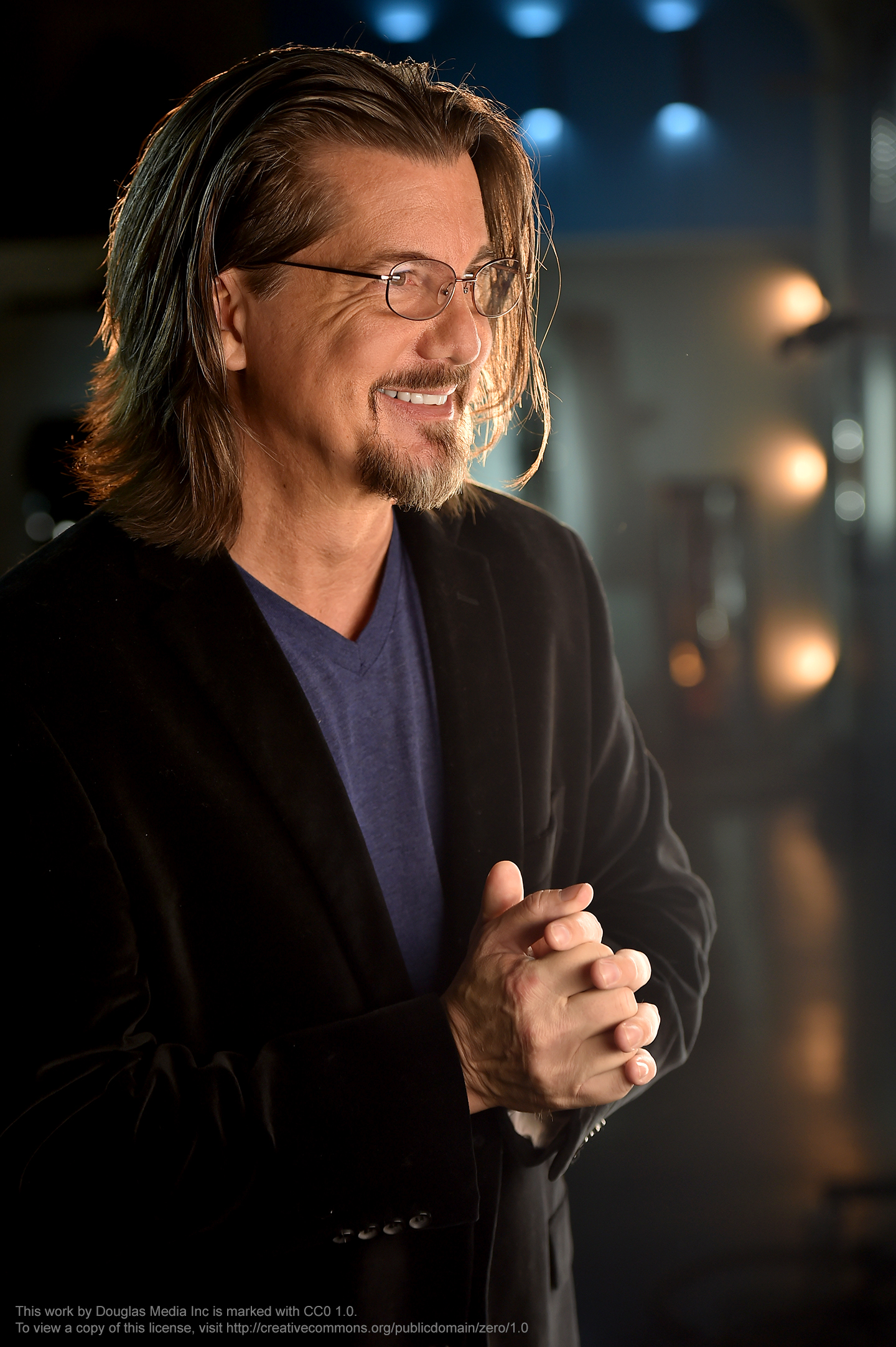
Wesker has been voiced by several actors, including D. C. Douglas.

Wesker was originally voiced by Pablo Kuntz, who said that Capcom's staff gave him limited direction and that he did not fully understand the game's plot at the time of recording. He later reflected on his performance, stating: "I know the acting was slightly over-the-top, but you know, the more we played RE1, the more the voices seemed to harmonize with everything the gameplay offered". Being largely unaware of the following his performance gained over the years, he was also surprised at the character's popularity among fans, commenting that it was "a wonderful experience" to voice him.

Peter Jessop voiced the character in the 2002 remake of Resident Evil and a recreational arcade game released solely in Japan. Wesker was next voiced by Richard Waugh in Resident Evil – Code: Veronica. His performance of Wesker was influenced by George Sanders, particularly his role as Shere Khan in The Jungle Book. He wanted to give the character a "precise and inhuman" speech pattern by speaking with a "military-type" tone and never using contractions. He reprised his role in Wesker's Report, a fictional documentary detailing Wesker's backstory, as well as Resident Evil Zero and Resident Evil 4. He also provided voice recordings in Resident Evil: The Umbrella Chronicles, but they were replaced by D. C. Douglas's recordings before launch.

Douglas then voiced Wesker in Resident Evil: The Umbrella Chronicles, Resident Evil 5, Resident Evil: The Darkside Chronicles, Resident Evil: The Mercenaries 3D, Resident Evil Zero HD Remaster, Resident Evil: Revelations 2, Umbrella Corps, Marvel vs. Capcom 3: Fate of Two Worlds, and Ultimate Marvel vs. Capcom 3.

Ken Lally provided a motion capture for Wesker in Resident Evil 5. In the 2023 remake of Resident Evil 4, he was voiced and motion captured by Craig Burnatowski. Burnatowski would also voice and motion capture the character of Zeno in Resident Evil Requiem (2026), a character with visual and behavioral similarities to Wesker. Eric Pirius portrayed Wesker in the Resident Evil live-action cutscenes. In Resident Evil: Extinction, Jason O'Mara portrayed Wesker, and Shawn Roberts portrayed him in Resident Evil: Afterlife, Resident Evil: Retribution, and Resident Evil: The Final Chapter. Tom Hopper portrayed Wesker in Resident Evil: Welcome to Raccoon City. He explained that the filmmakers did not want Wesker "to be a stereotypical villain, we wanted him to be likable. We're seeing who he really is underneath the sunglasses."

In the 2022 Resident Evil Netflix series, Lance Reddick portrayed the character; he was the first person of color to do so. The series' showrunners did not want to limit themselves to actors who resembled Wesker's in-game appearance; showrunner Andrew Dabb stated that "you're making the show weaker by going with someone that may be more aesthetically a match to the game." Reddick did not know that the character was from a video game series, stating: "When I was doing it, I didn't think of having to play an already established iconic character, I just kept trying to bring what was on the page to life". He further said, "This Wesker, although very very much based on the Wesker in the games, isn't exactly him".

== Appearances ==
=== In the Resident Evil series ===
Resident Evil games featuring Albert Wesker
1996	Resident Evil
1997	Resident Evil: Director's Cut
1998–1999
2000	Resident Evil – Code: Veronica
2001
2002	Resident Evil (remake)
2002	Resident Evil Zero
2003–2004
2005	Resident Evil 4
2006
2007	Resident Evil: The Umbrella Chronicles
2008	Resident Evil: Genesis
2009	Resident Evil 5
2009	Resident Evil: The Darkside Chronicles
2010
2011	Resident Evil: Mercenaries Vs.
2011	Resident Evil: The Mercenaries 3D
2012–2014
2015	Resident Evil: Revelations 2
2016–2022
2023	Resident Evil 4 (remake)
2024–2026
2027	Resident Evil Veronica (remake)

Every game in the series is set in the fictional American metropolitan area of Raccoon City until its destruction at the end of Resident Evil 3: Nemesis. Wesker's presence was initially limited to cutscenes in the main Resident Evil games, where he manipulates the series' events from the background. He leverages his genius-level intellect to engineer mutagenic viruses to forcefully advance human evolution. Wesker's backstory was largely left undeveloped until the release of The Wesker Report, a fictional documentary that details his virology research and role within the Umbrella Corporation. Resident Evil 5 reveals the Umbrella Corporation raised Wesker as part of a eugenics program, which offers him the best education but also indoctrinates him into developing misanthropic views and a superiority complex.

Wesker debuted in the original Resident Evil (1996), where he is the captain of the Special Tactics and Rescue Service (S.T.A.R.S.), a special forces police unit in Raccoon City. He initially helps the player by providing supplies and useful information. However, the protagonists learn Wesker is secretly working with the Umbrella Corporation to develop mutagenic viruses and bio-organic weapons (BOWs). Wesker is seemingly killed after releasing his latest BOW, the Tyrant, which unexpectedly impales him during the game's finale.

He returned to the franchise after a two-game hiatus in Resident Evil – Code: Veronica (2000) as the game's secondary antagonist. He survives his apparent death due to an experimental virus that not only resurrected him after suffering grievous injuries but also endowed him with enhanced strength, speed, and agility. Wesker, now working for an unnamed rival to the Umbrella Corporation, conducts a raid on a secret research facility in Antarctica. He encounters Chris Redfield, who arrives at the facility while searching for his missing sister, Claire. Wesker overpowers Chris but spares him as the facility begins to self-destruct. Wesker makes a cameo appearance in Resident Evil 4 (2005), where he is revealed to be working with Ada Wong to obtain a specimen sample for further BOW research.

Wesker is the main antagonist of Resident Evil 5 (2009), where he conspires to release the Uroboros virus across the world and trigger an extinction event. He appears as a nigh-invincible boss, effortlessly dodging and parrying most of the player's attacks. Chris and his partner Sheva halt Wesker's plans and kill him in an active volcano. The Resident Evil producer Masachika Kawata said that Wesker's death would be permanent and there was "no chance" he would return. Nonetheless, Wesker's plans continue to drive the overarching Resident Evil plot, as his research causes many of the disasters and outbreaks in subsequent games. Resident Evil Requiem (2026) introduces Zeno, a high-ranking member of the Connections crime syndicate who shares Wesker's appearance, mannerisms, and powers. The main antagonist Victor Gideon refers to Zeno as an "imitation", which GameSpot interpreted as implying that Zeno is a clone of Wesker.

=== Other appearances ===
Wesker appears in several of the Resident Evil live-action film series. His character was adapted for the 2007 live-action film Resident Evil: Extinction. This version of Wesker is the head of the Umbrella Corporation, unlike Wesker's role in the games as a renegade high-ranking Umbrella researcher. He runs Umbrella's operations from behind the scenes, holding meetings via hologram with his underground board of directors in Tokyo. Originally, Wesker's character was not intended to be in the film, with his role and lines in the script being given to Commander Okamoto. He reappears in 2010's Resident Evil: Afterlife as the main antagonist of the film. He later appears in Resident Evil: Retribution (2012) as a defector from Umbrella, who sends Ada to rescue Alice from an underground Russian Umbrella outpost run by the Red Queen, who has taken over the rest of Umbrella. Wesker returns in the sixth film, Resident Evil: The Final Chapter (2016), where he betrays Alice. She then tracks him down to the Hive and kills him. His death triggers a dead man's switch, which destroys the Hive and everyone within, including Alicia Marcus, the Umbrella High Command, and thousands of others held in stasis. In the reboot film Resident Evil: Welcome to Raccoon City (2021), he is portrayed as a more sympathetic police officer for the Raccoon Police Department and serves as a secondary antagonist. Notwithstanding his appearance in the Resident Evil Netflix series (2022), which delves into his backstory and personal experiments with human cloning.

Wesker is a playable character in several non-canonical Resident Evil games. (Note: Sources that cite Wesker as a playable character in several non-canonical Resident Evil games include:) He features in numerous Resident Evil mobile games. He appears in two games in the Marvel vs. Capcom franchise and in the asymmetrical survival horror game Dead by Daylight (2016). He also makes a cameo appearance as an unlockable alternate skin in Lost Planet 2 (2010), Street Fighter V (2016) for Urien as an alternate skin, as a spirit in the Nintendo crossover video game Super Smash Bros. Ultimate (2018), in the digital collectible card game Teppen (2019), and Astro Bot (2024). In Pragmata (2026), an unclaimed website, aweskerproduction.com, referenced in the billboards, was filled with Resident Evil memes, including Wesker after a Russian player capitalized it.

Wesker features in novelizations of the first game and Code: Veronica. In the former, titled The Umbrella Conspiracy, Wesker is attacked by multiple Chimeras and fatally wounded; he manages to awaken the Tyrant, which kills him. Several comic books based on the games were released, and he is a character in Bandai's Resident Evil Deck Building Card Game (2011). Merchandise featuring Wesker includes action figures and gun replicas.

== Reception ==
Wesker has often been described as one of the best and most memorable villains in video game history by various gaming publications. (Note: Sources that cite Wesker as one of the best and most memorable villains:) In 2013, Guinness World Records named Wesker among the 50 greatest video game villains of all time. Kat Bailey of VG247 viewed Wesker is the perfect horror game villain, describing him as "the overarching antagonist through much of the series". Jesse Schedeen of IGN discussed his appearances across the franchise and also said that "even if the games start over from square one, we highly doubt Wesker will be left out of the party". GamesRadar+ staff described him among the "best characters in the three decades of Capcom's history", writing that despite his death in Resident Evil 5, "Wesker shows no signs of stopping, which is just the way we like it".

Kazuma Hashimoto of Polygon noted that Wesker's light skin and blonde hair evoke the aesthetic of the Übermensch, the Nazi conception of the ideal human being; he argued that Wesker's resemblance to the Nazi Übermensch reflected the franchise's "core" theme of eugenics. Hashimoto also noted that Wesker's monologue in Resident Evil 5 drew on standard Social Darwinist talking points from Friedrich Nietzsche's Übermensch theory, which helped to fully illustrate both the visual metaphor and ideology that Wesker embodies. Together with other themes from the series, Hashimoto viewed Wesker's monologue as creating a sense of terror that is intensely political and genuinely unsettling.

Wesker has also received negative critical reviews for his perceived lack of depth and being a stereotypical villain. Obi Anyanwu of Complex described him as the "second-douchiest" video game character, stating that "Wesker has a following, yes, but there's something very Agent Smith, a villain in The Matrix, about him that makes us shake our heads." Andy Kelly of PC Gamer commented that Wesker lacked the depth of a complex villain and instead embodied the over-the-top antagonist trope, surmising the character as "a comically evil asshole who can do cool Matrix moves and transform into a monster." Ben Yahtzee Croshaw of The Escapist said that he cannot stand Wesker and described him as "emotionless shithead", "grating", and "boring cunt." Bob Mackey of 1UP.com has called him one of the least scary things in Resident Evil, suggesting that "[t]o accentuate his alleged nefariousness, we suggest that Wesker grow a zombie mustache — that twirls itself."

Wesker's demise in Resident Evil 5's final boss fight has received praise.

The final boss battle involving Wesker and his death in Resident Evil 5 was praised by critics. Matt Cundy of GamesRadar+ praised Wesker's death scene in Resident Evil 5, as it showed the character's strength. Brandon Trush of Bloody Disgusting and Luke McKinney of Den of Geek both echoed a similar sentiment and regarded Weskers' death scene as one of the most outstanding and over-the-top moments of the Resident Evil series. Shubhankar Parijat of GamingBolt lamented that "Resident Evil hasn't had an overbearing villainous presence since Wesker died", but noted that "his arc was wrapped up very well, and bringing him back might not be the best idea." Rich Stanton of Eurogamer, while viewing the final battle against Wesker as a "terrible boss fight" did also described it as "unforgettable" as it manages to "showcase a certain mindset about what an ultimate action climax should be". Andy Kelly of PlayStation Official Magazine described the battle with Wesker in Resident Evil 5 as one of the worst boss fights in a PlayStation 3 game.

Lance Reddick's portrayal of Wesker in the 2022 Resident Evil Netflix series was lauded by critics. Zosha Millman of Polygon described his performance as the "perfect balance of menacing and mannered." Charles Pulliam-Moore of The Verge offered a mixed review of the series but cited Wesker as the show's best character, which they attributed to Reddick's "steely, menacing energy". Taylor Lyes of IGN noted that the Netflix series' portrayal and characterization of Wesker diverged from his video game counterpart, but commended the character's revised backstory and story arc.
