= Under the Skin (video game) =

2004 video game

- North American box art
- Developer: Capcom Production Studio 4
- Publisher: Capcom
- Director: Hiroki Kato
- Producer: Hiroyuki Kobayashi
- Writer: Hiroki Kato
- Composers: Chamy Ishi; Marika Suzuki; Shusaku Uchiyama
- Platform: PlayStation 2
- Release: JP: August 5, 2004; NA: October 12, 2004; EU: October 22, 2004; AU: October 28, 2004
- Genre: Action-adventure
- Modes: Single-player, multiplayer

Under the Skin, known in Japan as Meiwaku Seijin: Panikku Mēkā, (Note: Japanese: めいわく星人 パニックメーカー; lit. Annoying Alien: Panic Maker) is an action-adventure stealth video game by Capcom. It was developed by the company's Production Studio 4, and released in 2004 for the PlayStation 2. Containing science fiction and comedy elements, the main character of the game's story is an alien named Cosmi, sent from the fictional Planet Mischief to Earth to play pranks on humans.

== Gameplay ==
As Cosmi, players are vulnerable in his alien form. Players zap humans with Cosmi's ray gun in order to trap their identity, which they can then take on by standing on UFO icons marked on the mini-map. Each human has a different ability that can be used for causing mischief, such as boomboxes, vacuum cleaners or bazookas. Successfully knocking over humans yields coins that are required to complete the goals set in each level. Once pranked, humans will become hostile towards Cosmi and try to attack him. While disguised, Cosmi can take two hits, the first leaving him in underwear—which Dan Whitehead of Eurogamer described as "a Capcom fetish dating back to Ghosts 'n Goblins"—while the second one reverts him to his vulnerable alien form. Earthlings will continue to chase and attack Cosmi, forcing him to lose coins, until he can find another UFO to change into another disguise. At certain points in the level, a Panic Time will occur where chaos ensues for a short amount of time.

== Plot ==
The story revolves around Cosmi, a small, blue, three-year-old alien from the Planet Mischief, where there is a tradition that, once someone turns three years old, they must travel to a planet and learn how to perform "Mischief" and cause panic on that planet. Cosmi travels to Earth for his mission, in order to impress his father, the Master of Mischief, Cosmi Sr., mostly because Earth is considered the greatest challenge. Cosmi crashes with a TV satellite from a town called Coco Town. When crash landing, he manages to hide in an alley on Coco Town, where he is saved by Earth's Mischief Master, Master Itazura. He takes him to his Dojo to train, and lets Cosmi move on with his mission, in eight different locations: Coco Town, High Stakes Hill, Pranksylvania, Pharaoh Island, Big Booty Bay, Frontiersville, Raccoon City and finally Cosmopolis. It is revealed that Cosmopolis is a trap for anti-alien forces to capture all of the aliens on Earth by disguising themselves as aliens. Itazura uses their trap as the final challenge for Cosmi, and challenges him personally there. Cosmi wins and travels back to Planet Mischief to celebrate, but crashes into another TV station and crash lands again in the middle of Coco Town square. Panic arises and reporters try to get a picture of Cosmi, who accidentally pushes one of their cameras around. The ensuing photo of the crowd reveals that several of them are also aliens.

== Production ==
Under the Skin was created by the Capcom division Production Studio 4, and was the second-to-last game to be made by the division behind Resident Evil 4 before it was absorbed into Capcom. The game opens with the 1969 George Baker Selection song "Little Green Bag", which previously became notable for soundtracking the 1992 film Reservoir Dogs. It also features a level that takes place in Raccoon City, a locale in the Resident Evil franchise, which also prominently features the series' character Nemesis.

== Reception ==
Reception

Aggregate score
Aggregator	Score
Metacritic	55/100

Review scores
Publication	Score
Edge	6/10
Electronic Gaming Monthly	4.5/10
Eurogamer	4/10
Famitsu	31/40
Game Informer	5/10
GameRevolution	D+
GameSpot	6.1/10
GameSpy	2.5/5
GameZone	6/10
IGN	6/10
Official U.S. PlayStation Magazine	3.5/5
The Sydney Morning Herald	2/5

Under the Skin received "mixed" reviews according to the review aggregation website Metacritic. In a retrospective review for Eurogamer in 2021, Dan Whitehead wrote that the game was "fun ... in small doses" but not "particularly good", criticizing its "unhelpful camera", "confusing action", "exhausting" and "over the top" tone and characters, but also remarking that it was "hard not to wish the big publishers would still roll the dice of daft experiments like Under the Skin".
