= Resident Evil (2002 video game) =

Survival horror game

- North American cover art
- Developer: Capcom Production Studio 4
- Publisher: Capcom
- Director: Shinji Mikami
- Producer: Hiroyuki Kobayashi
- Designers: Kouji Kakae; Joesuke Kaji; Shigenori Nishikawa
- Programmer: Hideaki Motozuka
- Artist: Naoki Katakai
- Composers: Shusaku Uchiyama; Makoto Tomozawa; Misao Senbongi
- Series: Resident Evil
- Engine: MT Framework (HD remaster)
- Platforms: GameCube; Wii; PlayStation 3; PlayStation 4; Windows; Xbox 360; Xbox One; Nintendo Switch
- Release: March 22, 2002: GameCube; JP: March 22, 2002; NA: April 30, 2002; EU: September 13, 2002; AU: September 20, 2002 Wii; JP: December 25, 2008; NA: June 23, 2009; AU: June 25, 2009; EU: June 26, 2009 PS3, PS4, Win, Xbox 360, Xbox One; JP: November 27, 2014; WW: January 20, 2015 Nintendo Switch; WW: May 21, 2019; JP: May 23, 2019
- Genre: Survival horror
- Mode: Single-player

Resident Evil (Note: Known in Japan as Biohazard, stylized as biohazard (Japanese: バイオハザード, Hepburn: baiohazādo). The Japanese version of the remake has the title spelled entirely in lowercase letters, as opposed to the uppercase style used in the original game.) is a 2002 survival horror game developed and published by Capcom for the GameCube. It is a remake of the 1996 PlayStation game Resident Evil, the first installment in the Resident Evil video game series. The story takes place in 1998 near the fictional Midwestern town of Raccoon City where a series of bizarre murders have taken place. The player takes on the role of either Chris Redfield or Jill Valentine, S.T.A.R.S. officers sent in by the city and the R.P.D. to investigate the murders.

Resident Evil was developed over the course of fourteen months as part of an exclusivity deal between Capcom and Nintendo for the series in their Capcom Five partnership. It was directed by Shinji Mikami, who also designed and directed the original Resident Evil. Mikami decided to produce a remake because he felt that the original had not aged well enough and that the GameCube's capabilities could bring it closer to his original vision. The game retains the same graphical presentation, with 3D models superimposed over pre-rendered backgrounds. However, the quality of the graphics was vastly improved. The remake also features new gameplay mechanics, revised puzzles, additional explorable areas, a revised script, and new story details including an entire subplot cut from the original game.

Upon release, Resident Evil received acclaim from video game journalists, who praised its graphics and improved gameplay over the original game. It is often described as one of the best, scariest, and most visually impressive entries in the Resident Evil series. However, the game sold worse than expected, leading Capcom to change the direction of the series to a more action-oriented approach. In 2008, the game was ported to the Wii, featuring a new control system. In 2015, a high-definition remaster was released to critical and commercial success for PlayStation 3, PlayStation 4, Windows, Xbox 360, and Xbox One, then later for Nintendo Switch in 2019. Retrospectively, critics and fans regard Resident Evil as one of the greatest game remakes ever made.

== Gameplay ==
The player, controlling Chris Redfield, can use defensive weapons such as daggers when grabbed by zombies. The game features 3D models over pre-rendered backgrounds.

Resident Evil is a survival horror game where the player controls the on-screen character from a third-person perspective to interact with the environment. To advance, the player must explore a mansion and its surrounding areas while avoiding, outsmarting and defeating monsters including zombies and giant spiders. The player can open doors, push certain objects, climb obstacles, and pick up items. When an item is collected, it is stored in an inventory that the player can access at any time. Items in the inventory can be used, examined, and combined to solve puzzles and gain access to areas that were previously inaccessible. The inventory is limited to a certain number of slots, and the player must often move items from the inventory to storage boxes located in certain areas to manage space.

Although the player can use firearms to kill monsters, Resident Evil emphasizes evasion over fast-paced combat by providing the player with limited ammunition. The player has a limited amount of health, which decreases when attacked by monsters. Players can regain health by collecting and using herbs, which can be mixed with other herbs to increase their healing effect. Some monsters can also infect the player with a poisoning effect, which gradually depletes the player's health over time until the poison is cured with serum or special herbs. Zombies that are defeated but not beheaded or burned eventually revive and mutate into faster and deadlier forms.

The player can control either Chris Redfield or Jill Valentine, each with advantages and disadvantages. For example, Chris can take and deal more damage than Jill, but Jill can carry more items and unlock certain doors with a lock pick. Both characters can equip defensive weapons that can save them from taking damage when seized by an enemy. These defensive weapons include a dagger and a unique special weapon: Jill can use a taser, while Chris can shove stun grenades into zombies' mouths and detonate them with a pistol shot. Defensive weapons are limited and can only be used when the player is grabbed by a monster.

The game features an automap to help players navigate the different areas of the game. Additionally, the player can pick up maps of certain sections to reveal unexplored areas. To save their progress, players need to find ink ribbons and use them with a typewriter; the game features a limited supply of ink ribbons, so players cannot save their progress as many times as they want. The story is slightly altered by the character the player chooses to play as, and certain choices the player makes in the game can impact the direction of the game and its ending. Upon completing the game under a certain difficulty setting and time limit, the player may unlock secret costumes for the main characters, bonus weapons, and special difficulty modes.

== Plot ==
On July 24, 1998, a series of bizarre murders occur on the outskirts of the Midwestern town of Raccoon City. The Raccoon City Police Department's Special Tactics And Rescue Service (S.T.A.R.S.) are assigned to investigate. After contact with Bravo Team is lost, Alpha Team is sent to locate their whereabouts. Finding Bravo Team's crashed helicopter in a forest, they descend to investigate, but are attacked by a pack of monstrous dogs, killing one of them. After Alpha Team's helicopter pilot, Brad Vickers, panics and flies off alone, remaining members Chris Redfield, Jill Valentine, Albert Wesker, and Barry Burton retreat inside a nearby abandoned mansion, where they decide to split up.

While exploring the mansion, the player-controlled character (either Chris or Jill) finds several members of Bravo Team, including Kenneth J. Sullivan, who is devoured alive by a zombie; Richard Aiken, who is either killed by a giant snake or eaten by a large shark; Forest Speyer, who is found dead and reanimates as a zombie; and Bravo Team leader Enrico Marini, who reveals there is a traitor among Alpha Team before being killed by an unseen shooter. Rebecca Chambers, a survivor from Bravo Team, joins Chris. The player character then learns about a series of illegal experiments conducted by a clandestine research team under the authority of biomedical company Umbrella Corporation. The mansion teems with monstrous creatures resulting from these experiments, which have exposed both personnel and wildlife to a highly infectious and mutagenic biological agent known as the T-virus.

The player character discovers a secret underground laboratory housing Umbrella's experiments. Inside, they find Jill or Chris (depending on the player's character choice) in a cell and witness Wesker programming a Tyrant, a humanoid bioweapon. Wesker reveals that he is a double agent working for Umbrella, and plans to use the Tyrant to kill the S.T.A.R.S. members. In the ensuing confrontation, Wesker is seemingly killed and the player character defeats the Tyrant. After activating the lab's self-destruct mechanism, the player character reaches the heliport and contacts Brad for extraction. The game's ending varies depending on the player's actions at key points: in the best ending, Chris, Jill, Barry, and Rebecca all escape via helicopter after defeating the Tyrant once more; in the worst ending, the mansion remains intact and the player character emerges as the sole survivor.

== Development ==
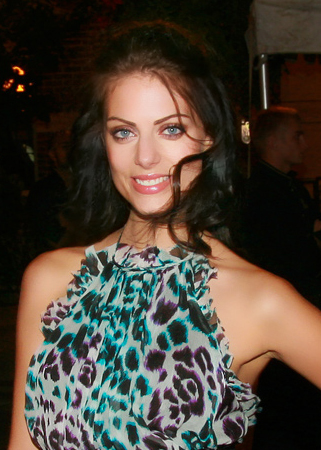
Canadian model Julia Voth served as the basis for Jill Valentine's facial and physical appearance.

Resident Evil was developed by Capcom Production Studio 4 and directed by Shinji Mikami, who designed and directed the original Resident Evil for the PlayStation console. The game was part of an exclusivity agreement between Capcom and Nintendo to bring previous and new Resident Evil games to the GameCube. Unlike Resident Evil 2, Resident Evil 3: Nemesis, and Resident Evil – Code: Veronica, which were simply ported to the GameCube, Mikami decided to produce a remake of the original game because he felt its graphics had not aged well, making it hard for new players to appreciate it. Programmer Yasuhiro Anpo also cited the original game's poor localization as another reason for the remake. Mikami and producer Hiroyuki Kobayashi agreed the GameCube would allow them to bring the game closer to the original vision the team had for the series. As Capcom's marketing director Todd Thorson said, the main goal was to "achieve motion picture-quality visuals and create even more suspense and fear than the original".

Production started at the beginning of 2001 with a team of only four programmers. Because Resident Evil was one of the first Capcom games developed for the GameCube, the development team had to study the system's performance during the first stages of development. In the process of development, the team wanted to make sure that those who had already played the 1996 version would find things to enjoy in the remake. Initially, the team considered creating the environments with computer graphic animation but then realized that this approach would require too much hardware capacity and processing to achieve realistic graphics. As a result, the graphical style of the remake features 3D models on top of pre-rendered backgrounds like early Resident Evil games. Despite this, the camera is more dynamic and can track the player at varying angles. The backgrounds also make use of particle effects and full motion video layers to simulate effects such as rushing water or swaying tree branches. Creating fear in players was a priority, and many of the game's backgrounds were designed to have a high contrast between dark and light so that enemies could appear unexpectedly.

Originally, the developers planned to only upgrade the graphics and tweak the gameplay. However, as the game approached completion, Capcom started making more substantial changes. For example, the inventory was expanded so that players could carry a standard item like Jill's lockpick, while defense items, which were initially included in the main inventory, were introduced to make the game easier than the original. Several new weapons were also added in order to expand the range of approaches to combat. Enemies in the game were rebalanced to accommodate for this. The developers originally planned to make all enemies invisible but the idea was discarded because it would have made the remake very different from the original game. However, they designed the zombies so that they could eventually come back to life after being killed, in the form of more dangerous Crimson Heads. The developers added new areas for the player to explore, changed most of the puzzle designs, and included an additional control scheme whereby players move their characters by pressing the R button of the GameCube controller and steer them with the analog stick. Another addition is a subplot involving the character Lisa Trevor. Instead of using adjectives to describe difficulty levels, Mikami decided to have unique questions so that the player would pick the hard one. In a later interview Kobayashi stated that many of these additions and substantial changes were a deliberate effort to attract veteran players.

Capcom auditioned actors to be used as references by the character designers. The faces of the protagonists were based on real people and motion capture was used to animate their models. About 60 percent of the character motions were animated based on the captured data, while the rest was created from scratch. The developers initially struggled to develop a system for computer graphic animation. However, Nintendo provided Capcom with assistance and the problems were eventually solved. Capcom also hired new voice actors and rewrote the game's script to make the plot more convincing. The game was developed over the course of one year and two months. Final development was very intense, as programmers had to work for two straight months with no days off to meet the deadline. Resident Evil was released in 2002 on March 22 in Japan, April 30 in North America, and September 13 in Europe, and September 20 in Australia.

== Reception ==
Reception (GameCube)

Aggregate score
Aggregator	Score
Metacritic	91/100

Review scores
Publication	Score
AllGame	4.5/5
Edge	8/10
Famitsu	10/10, 9/10, 10/10, 10/10
GamePro	4.5/5
GameRevolution	A−
GameSpot	8.9/10
GameSpy	4.5/5
IGN	9.0/10
NGC Magazine	89/100

Upon its release on the GameCube, Resident Evil received critical acclaim. IGN reviewer Matt Casamassina felt that the game is "a triumph as a stand-alone adventure and a major accomplishment as a remake", calling it "the prettiest, most atmospheric and all-around scariest game we've ever played." Similarly, GameSpot reviewer Shane Satterfield described the remake as "one amazing game that clearly stands as the best the series has to offer", while Edge magazine remarked that the game's unforgiving gameplay and technical artistry improve the tension and anxiety that the original offered.

The game was widely praised for its graphics. GameSpot credited the attention to detail, realistic gore, volumetric fog, and integration of real-time lighting and shadows with pre-rendered backgrounds, commenting that Capcom had "finally perfected the art of mixing prerendered scenery with ambient animations and polygonal objects, and the result is the most visually impressive video game ever released." IGN highlighted the complex geometry of the character models, stating that "close shots of Chris or Jill look almost photo-realistic." Writing for NGC Magazine, Jes Bickham remarked that, unlike in the original Resident Evil, the contrast between character models and backgrounds is seamless. He also noted that the game is "so visually rich that simply seeing the next area is an experience to be treasured."

The game's suspenseful and cinematic atmosphere received praise, with GameRevolution going so far as to say that the game makes the original Resident Evil look like Pong. Resident Evil was also praised for its realistic sound. AllGame reviewer Scott Alan Marriott felt that the game "[creates] a constant sense of dread without relying too much on obvious shock values", while GameSpot highlighted the quality and variety of sound effects, noting that "there seem to be dozens of sound effects for footsteps alone." However, some publications considered the voice acting to be weak due to its exaggerated delivery.

Although the game's limiting controls and inventory management were criticized, changes to many aspects of the gameplay were positively viewed. Mike Weigand of GamePro wrote, "It's like playing Resident Evil for the first time." GameSpot remarked that the defensive weapons add a new layer of strategy to the game. However, the controls were criticized for their lack of analog precision, a feature that was previously available in the Nintendo 64 version of Resident Evil 2. Hector Guzman of GameSpy criticized the fact that the original game's "laborious" tank controls, whereby the analog stick moves the player character in the direction they are facing, was not changed, stating that it can cause unnecessary difficulties when players try to evade monsters. IGN's criticism was similar but considered the game's alternative control schemes a welcome addition.

GameSpot editors named Resident Evil the best video game of April 2002. At the GameSpot's Best and Worst of 2002 awards, Resident Evil was nominated for Best Story on GameCube, Best Graphics (Technical) on GameCube, and Best Action Adventure Game on GameCube. As of November 2003, 445,176 copies of the game had been sold in the United States. In May 2008, Capcom revealed that a total of 1.35 million copies of the game were sold.

=== Legacy ===
Resident Evil is often regarded as one of the greatest and most visually impressive games in the series. According to IGN, the game's graphics "became the new standard by which all future installments in the series would be compared." In 2009, Official Nintendo Magazine ranked the game 43rd in a list of greatest Nintendo games. Digital Spy writer Liam Martin remarked that the game is "the definitive version of a true classic" and that it still looked "fantastic" nearly 13 years after it was first released. In Capcom's 2003 Annual Report the company stated that the game had "made good sales" and viewed the game's commercial performance favorably. Despite this, Mikami was disappointed with sales numbers which drove the decision that subsequent games in the Resident Evil series would shift away from the survival horror genre and incorporate more action-based elements, starting with Resident Evil 4 in 2005. Before that happened, Capcom developed Resident Evil Zero, a direct prequel using the same graphics engine and released in late 2002.

== Re-release and remaster ==
=== Wii version ===
On December 25, 2008, Resident Evil was ported to the GameCube's successor, the Wii, along with Resident Evil Zero. The port, Resident Evil Archives: Resident Evil, features a control system that supports both the Wii Remote and the GameCube controller. Although Capcom originally had no plans to release the Wii version outside of Japan, arguing that the game would not sell very well, the game was eventually released in North America on June 23, Australia on June 25, and in Europe on June 26, 2009, due to the commercial success of Resident Evil 5. The Wii version received generally favorable reviews from critics, but some publications criticized it for its outdated controls, lack of new features, and lack of widescreen support.

=== HD remaster ===
Reception

Aggregate scores
Aggregator	Score
Metacritic	PC: 82/100; PS4: 83/100; XONE: 82/100; NS: 80/100
OpenCritic	79% recommend

Review scores
Publication	Score
Eurogamer	7/10
Game Informer	9.5/10
GameRevolution	4/5
GameSpot	7/10
IGN	8.0/10

A high-definition (HD) version, Resident Evil HD Remaster, was released for PlayStation 3, PlayStation 4, Windows, Xbox 360, and Xbox One in January 2015. The HD version supports 5.1 surround sound as well as a resolution of 1080p and a widescreen aspect ratio of 16:9. Although the original pre-rendered backgrounds have a 4:3 format, the developers decided against re-rendering them in 16:9 because it would allow players to see more of the environment than intended, reducing the sense of immersion and danger. As a result, the developers added vertical scrolling to the backgrounds, which respond to the movement of the character, to fit the remaster's widescreen aspect ratio. A new control scheme was also included, allowing players to move their character in the direction of the analog stick.

The remaster was a commercial success, breaking sales records. It became the PlayStation Network's biggest launch game and Capcom's fastest-selling digital game across North America and Europe. Capcom announced that the remaster exceeded sales of one million copies by April 2015. Its commercial success resulted in Capcom's announcement of a similar edition of Resident Evil Zero in 2015. Critical reception towards the remaster was generally favorable. Several critics noted that some features like the inventory system and the insistence on having to revisit previously explored areas have not aged very well, but generally agreed that the remaster was a solid revival of a classic. The new control scheme was also considered more intuitive and satisfying, especially for new players. As of September 2022, the remaster had sold 3.7 million copies worldwide across all platforms.

==== Resident Evil: Origins Collection ====
Resident Evil Zero and Resident Evil became a compilation called Resident Evil: Origins Collection, which was released on multiple consoles in 2015 and 2016, and on the Nintendo Switch in 2019.
