= Winters (name) =

Winters is a surname, and may refer to the following people:

== People ==
=== Men ===
- L. Alan Winters (born 1950), British development economist
- Alex Winters (born 1977), Welsh children's television presenter and actor
- Ben H. Winters (born 1976), American author, journalist, teacher and playwright
- Bernie Winters (1930–1991), English comedian
- Bill Winters (born 1961), American banker
- Bob Winters (fl. 1940s–1970s), American comic juggler and occasional actor
- Brendan Winters (born 1983), American basketball player
- Brian Winters (born 1952), American basketball player and coach
- Charles Winters (1913–1984), American who smuggled B-17 bombers to Israel in 1948
- Chet Winters (born 1960), running back in the National Football League
- Chuck Winters (born 1974), Canadian football player
- Clarence Winters (1899–1945), American baseball pitcher
- Dan Winters (born 1962), American portrait photographer, illustrator, filmmaker, and writer
- David Winters (disambiguation), multiple people
- Dean Winters (born 1964), American television actor
- Dee Winters (born 2000), American football player
- Eddie Winters (fl. 2010s), American police officer and politician
- Efrem Winters (1963–2025), American collegiate basketball player
- Eric Winters (1921–1968), English sculptor
- Eric Winters (American football) (born 2006), American football player
- Frank Winters (ice hockey), known as Frank "Coddy" Winters (1884–1944), American ice hockey player
- Frank Winters (born 1964), American NFL football player
- Fred Winters (born 1982), Canadian male volleyball player
- Frederick Winters, American weightlifter and Olympic medalist
- Ian Winters (1921–1994), Scottish footballer
- Jeffrey A. Winters, American political scientist
- Jesse Winters (1893–1986), American baseball player
- Joel Winters, American politician
- John D. Winters (1916–1997), American historian
- John Winters (footballer) (born 1960), English footballer
- Jonathan Winters (1925–2013), American comedic actor
- Joseph Winters (1824–1916), African-American abolitionist and inventor
- Kenneth W. Winters (born 1934), Kentucky legislator
- Larry Winters (1956–2015), American professional wrestler and trainer
- Lawrence Winters (1915–1965), American opera singer
- Leo Winters (1922–2005), Oklahoma politician
- Mark Winters (born 1971), boxer from Northern Ireland
- Matt Winters (born 1960), baseball player from Buffalo, New York
- Michael Sean Winters, American journalist and writer
- Michael Winters (disambiguation), multiple people
- Mike and Bernie Winters (Mike 1930–2013, Bernie 1932–1991), double-act of British comedians
- Nathan Winters (born 1978), American politician from Wyoming
- Nip Winters (1899–1971), pitcher in Negro league baseball
- Patrick Winters (1904–1994), Irish-born Pallottine priest
- Paul Winters (American football) (born 1958), American college football coach
- Paul Winters (hurler) (born 1994), Irish hurler
- Philip C. Winters (born 1937), Republican politician
- Ralph E. Winters (1909–2004), Canadian-born film editor
- Richard Winters (1918–2011), officer with the 506th Parachute Infantry Regiment during World War II
- Robbie Winters (born 1974), Scottish footballer
- Robert Winters (1910–1969), Canadian politician
- Robin Winters (born 1950), American conceptual artist and teacher
- Roland Winters (1904–1989), American actor
- Roy Winters (born 1975), English rugby union player
- Scott William Winters (born 1965), American actor
- Theodore H. Winters Jr. (1913–2008), American Navy flying ace during World War II
- Yvor Winters (1900–1968), American literary critic and poet

=== Women ===
- Amy Winters (born 1978), Australian Paralympic athlete
- Anne Winters (actress) (born 1994), American actress
- Anne Winters (poet), leftist American poet
- Charlotte Winters (1897–2007), last surviving female American veteran of The First World War
- Deborah Winters (born 1953), American actress and realtor
- Gloria Winters (1931–2010), American television actress
- Ivy Winters (born 1986), American drag performer, singer, and actor
- Jackie Winters (1937–2019), American politician
- Jane Winters (born 1970), British professor of digital humanities
- Joan Winters (1909–1933), American Broadway dancer
- Kari-Lynn Winters (born 1969), Canadian children's author and literacy researcher
- Kathleen Winters (1949–2010), American author and aviator
- Keelin Winters (born 1988), American footballer and daughter of Brian Winters
- Lisa Winters (born 1937), American model and December 1956 Playmate of the Month
- Marian Winters (1920–1978), American dramatist and actress
- Michelle Winters, Canadian writer and artist
- Mickey Winters (born 1940), American model and September 1962 Playmate of the Month
- Pepper Winters, American novelist born in Hong Kong
- Rebecca Winters, pseudonym of Rebecca Burton (1940–2023), American novelist
- Ruby Winters (1942–2016), American soul singer
- Shelley Winters (1920–2006), American actress
- Topaz Winters (born 1999), Singaporean writer

== Fictional characters ==
- Cher Winters, from the British Channel 4 soap opera Hollyoaks
- David Winters, portrayed by Paul Petersen in the 1958 film Houseboat
- David Winters, portrayed by Christopher Plummer in the 2008 film Emotional Arithmetic
- Delores Winters, a DC Comics character
- Drucilla Winters, from the American CBS soap opera The Young and the Restless
- Ethan Winters, from Capcom's survival horror game Resident Evil 7 & Resident Evil 8
- Malcolm Winters, from the American CBS soap opera The Young and the Restless
- Maggie Winters character portrayed by Faith Ford in the American CBS sitcom of the same name
- Max Winters character in the 2007 CGI Superhero film "TMNT"
- Neil Winters, from the American CBS soap opera The Young and the Restless
- Norah Winters, from Marvel Comics
- Olivia Winters, from the CBS Daytime soap opera, The Young and the Restless
- Talia Winters, on the science fiction television show Babylon 5
- Victoria Winters, in the cult classic series Dark Shadows
- Arthur Coleman Winters, portrayed by Colin Stinton from the British Series, "Doctor Who"

== See also ==
- Vinters
- Winter (surname)
- Winterson
- De Winter (surname)
- Winters (disambiguation)
