= Baker family =

Fictional family in a video game series

The Bakers
- Resident Evil family
- Select members of the Baker family. From left to right: Lucas, Jack, and Marguerite.
- First appearance: Resident Evil 7: Biohazard (2017)
- Created by: Capcom
Family members
- Jack Baker; Marguerite Baker; Lucas Baker; Zoe Baker; Joe Baker; Eveline

The Baker family consists of fictional characters featured in Capcom's Resident Evil video game series. First appearing in Resident Evil 7: Biohazard, its main family members are a nuclear family consisting of married couple Jack and Marguerite and their two adult children, Lucas and Zoe. Inspired by characters from seminal films in horror cinema such as The Shining, The Evil Dead, and The Texas Chain Saw Massacre, the Bakers reside within their bayou estate in the fictional parish of Dulvey, Louisiana in the United States.

Within the game's narrative, they are under the influence of Eveline, a biologically engineered being who "adopted" herself into the Baker family, granting the family superhuman powers at the expense of twisting most of them into insane and murderous individuals prior to the events of Resident Evil 7, with the exception of Zoe who retains a benevolent personality. The 2017 Resident Evil 7: End of Zoe DLC features Joe Baker, Jack's brother who is unaffected by Eveline, as its protagonist.

The Baker family has had a mostly positive reception from video game publications. Most commentators praised members of the Baker family as effective antagonists in Resident Evil 7, as well as the tragic backstory behind the descent of its members into villainous roles.

== Concept and creation ==
Concept art sketches depicting early iterations of the Bakers

Producer Jun Takeuchi made the decision to delay script writing during the development of Resident Evil: Biohazard to give the art design team more freedom to explore character designs, which resulted in the Baker family undergoing a variety of design changes. Numerous concept art sketches of the Bakers were produced in search for an image of the "terrifying family". The Bakers originally had a pet dog named Diane which would appear at the dinner table cutscene, but was ultimately cut from the game. Game director Kōshi Nakanishi noted that Takeuchi wanted to bring horror back to the forefront for Resident Evil 7, with The Evil Dead as its motif for a "compact but deep" experience; Takeuchi cited its intimate atmosphere set in a singular location, as well as its small cast of characters as inspirations for the game.

According to writer Morimasa Sato, Jack's namesake, as well as some of his mannerisms and personality, were inspired by actor Jack Nicholson's portrayal of Jack Torrance in Stanley Kubrick's The Shining. Tasked with explaining the character and giving him a role in the game, Sato developed Jack as a stalking antagonist with regenerative abilities, which enables him to repeatedly return and attack the player. A decision was made late in the game's development to create a duality with Jack as both a person and a creature; Takeuchi and Nakanishi ordered a rewrite of the dinner cutscene as they perceived the depicted behavior of Jack and his wife Marguerite to be overly normal.

The developers designed each Baker antagonist around a horror subgenre theme: Jack is an archetypal slasher film killer; Marguerite conveys body horror through her mutated body and power over insects; and Lucas, who does not kill his victims outright but physically or psychologically tortures them through dangerous and potentially fatal puzzles, represents psychological horror as depicted in the Saw film franchise.

== The Baker family ==
The Bakers are introduced in Resident Evil 7 as a close-knit family of grimy and grotesque individuals, with their personalities characterized as crude amalgamations of various backcountry stereotypes, ranging from a "hillbilly father and verbally abusive mother to a comatose grandmother and a son who is as deranged as The Joker". With the exception of Lucas and slight dysfunction in the family, the Bakers were previously compassionate towards one another and strangers in need before Eveline's infection turned most of them into violently sadistic psychopaths with a taste for human flesh.

Within the game, the Bakers were thought to have vanished from the local community in Dulvey, Louisiana and their estate falls into a derelict state of disrepair. This eventually leading to rumors of paranormal activity which prompted an investigation of the estate from media journalist Peter Walken and his crewmates Clancy Jarvis and Andre Stickland, where they fall victim to the Bakers. The family is noted for their enthusiasm for American football, with bobblehead figurines of football players littering the estate's premises. Their in-game roles bear some similarities to Nemesis from Resident Evil 3 as they have a tendency to make recurring and oft-times unexpected appearances to confront Ethan Winters, the main protagonist, throughout its narrative. As a result of the presence of a biologically engineered mold infecting their bodies, the villainous members of the Baker family gradually mutate into monstrous creatures when they are severely damaged.

Post-launch story-based DLC for Resident Evil 7 further explore the backstories and exploits of individual members of the Baker family. The "Bedroom scenario" in the Banned Footage Vol. 1 DLC follows Clancy's attempts to escape from the bedroom he is confined in and evade Marguerite. The "21" scenario from Banned Footage Vol. 2 sees Clancy being forced to play a sadistic card game orchestrated by Lucas, while Daughters explores the Bakers' past prior to their encounter with Eveline and her caretaker Mia Winters which leads to the events of the base game. Lucas serves as the main antagonist of Not A Hero, while Jack's brother Joe Baker appears in End of Zoe to rescue his niece Zoe Baker, the only member of the nuclear family mentally unaffected by Eveline.

=== Jack Baker ===
Voiced by (English): Jack Brand (RE7)
Voiced by (Japanese): Kazuhiro Yamaji (RE7)

Jack Baker is one of the primary antagonists of Resident Evil 7: Biohazard. Jack is a middle-aged man who is the head of the Baker family, the husband of Marguerite, and the father of Lucas and Zoe. After Ethan manages to "kill" Mia, Jack knocks him out (Note: In Resident Evil: Village, it is revealed that Jack actually killed Ethan, and that Ethan was actually revived by the mold for the rest of the game.), and brings him to a macabre dinner with the rest of the Baker family. He serves as a recurring threat throughout the game, as he relentlessly pursues Ethan using a variety of weapons and is able to survive grievous bodily harm, even after being set ablaze when a car bursts into flames inside a garage after brutally murdering a policeman who had come across Ethan. To prove to Ethan he is no longer a normal human being, he also takes his gun and seemingly dies after blowing his own head off, only to rise again and continue pursuing Ethan. Later on, Ethan has a chainsaw duel with Jack, which culminates with Jack's upper torso being obliterated, only for Jack to yet again return, albeit as a large grotesque creature with eyes on his legs, whom Ethan defeats by injecting Jack with a serum meant to neutralize Eveline's powers and influence in others, which calcifies him in the process. Jack later appears to Ethan in a dream like sequence as a seemingly normal man, with Ethan acknowledging his victimhood by Eveline along with the rest of the Bakers.

Jack returns as a major enemy in End of Zoe which is a downloadable content chapter that takes place after the main game. His poisoned cells mutating out of control, Jack reconstituted as a decayed but near invincible creature nicknamed the "Swamp Man" acting on his own accord following Eveline's death. He stalks after Zoe and abducts her from his estranged brother Joe Baker who tries to cure her, with Joe eventually killing Jack for good and completely obliterating his upper body.

Jack appears as a playable character in the 2021 multiplayer game Resident Evil RE: Verse, which is a companion game to Resident Evil Village.

=== Marguerite Baker ===
Voiced by (English): Sara Coates (RE7)
Voiced by (Japanese): Maki Izawa (RE7)

Marguerite Baker is the wife of Jack and the mother of Lucas and Zoe. Whilst her husband and son's powers are limited to regeneration and super-strength, Marguerite possesses the ability to control insects, to the point that multiple of them start to reside within her body. She was first shown in various footage that was unveiled during 2016, including a clip featuring the scene where her family have the main protagonist Ethan Winters seated at the dinner table. Marguerite was more prominently featured in the Lantern demo, following Mia, Ethan's wife. Like her other family members, she spouts a lot of profanity. Marguerite is depicted as preoccupied with preparing meals for her family and guests, although the food she serves under the influence of Eveline has an unappetizing appearance and of questionable hygiene or origin.

During the story, she is seen pursuing Mia as she attempts to record information for Ethan's benefit. When Ethan first encounters her, she summons swarms of oversized insects to attack Ethan. Ethan would face Marguerite one more time at a nearby greenhouse, where she mutates and develops elongated, spindly limbs, a mutated insect hive within her lower torso, and behavior akin to an insect queen. Despite this, Ethan is ultimately able to kill her, and she ends up calcifying and dying.

=== Lucas Baker ===
Voiced by (English): Jesse Pimentel (RE7)
Voiced by (Japanese): Setsuji Satō (RE7)

Lucas Baker is the son of Jack and Marguerite and Zoe's brother, a mentally unstable genius. Unlike his parents, Lucas was sadistic and psychotic before being infected by Eveline, as he received a serum from The Connections that allowed him to retain his free will and powers from the Mold in return to observe Eveline for them. Lucas ultimately betrays his benefactors with the intent of using Eveline for his own agenda. Lucas also weaponized a series of areas with traps and monsters in the family's barn, which Ethan managed to survive in part of watching a recording of Lucas's previous victim Clancy. Unlike his parents, who actively chase after and mutate in their pursuit of Ethan, Lucas is rarely physically seen, instead appearing on TV screens as he forces Ethan to play his games. Lucas's fate is dealt with in a new sub-chapter entitled Not a Hero, which follows Chris Redfield and is set following the events of the base game. After losing three soldiers to Lucas's deadly machinations and traversing gas filled tunnels in the salt mines, Chris eventually locates Lucas and shoots him, who mutates into a powerful creature before being slain by Chris. Chris then destroys the computers to prevent the data on Eveline from being transferred to an unknown client. Lucas also appears in the downloadable content "Banned Footage" chapters, which predates the main story.

=== Zoe Baker ===
Voiced by (English): Giselle Gilbert (RE7)
Voiced by (Japanese): Yū Kobayashi (RE7)
Face model: Ananda Jacobs (RE7)

Zoe is the youngest child of Jack and Marguerite who retained her mental faculties despite being infected by Eveline like the rest of her family. In the Daughters downloadable content sub-chapter in which Zoe is playable, it depicts the events that lead to Eveline taking control of her family one by one. There are two possible endings: Zoe can either enter the trailer after finding out the passcode number from the attic to learn of the location of a key item, and finds Mia in her trailer, as well as an important note she wrote, or she can use the car keys given to her by her mother, which results in a poor ending due to the player choosing the "wrong path" for Zoe.

In the End of Zoe DLC, Zoe was found by her uncle Joe along with two Umbrella operatives who claim they are trying to save her. He takes one hostage, but the operative later gets killed by a horribly mutated Jack. Joe fights his way through a marsh to locate a cure. He injects Zoe with some serum he took off a dead soldier, but it only partially heals her. Out in the swamp, he has to get the other half, and ultimately kill his brother. Zoe is eventually completely cured after Jack is killed once and for all, and Ethan contacts her, revealing he kept his promise to send her help.

=== Joe Baker ===
Voiced by (English): Gage Maverik (RE7)

Joe Baker is the main protagonist in the End of Zoe DLC chapter for Resident Evil 7: Biohazard. The brother of Jack Baker, he lives in the nearby swamplands near the Baker estate, though is isolated from the rest of the family and unaffected by Eveline's control. During the chapter, Joe discovers his niece, Zoe, shortly after the events of the main game and tries to find a cure to free her from Eveline's influence. To do so, he battles against the remnants of the molded creatures created by the Bakers and a mysterious creature chasing after them, later revealed to be a resurrected Jack. Joe ultimately kills his brother and is able to cure Zoe, after which they are found and extracted by the Umbrella Corps. Although he can use firearms, Joe mostly fights with his bare hands, though later acquires an Umbrella Corps glove to increase his strength prior to his final battle with Jack.

=== Eveline ===
Voiced by (English): Patricia McNeely (RE7 (Old Woman)), Paula Rhodes (RE7 (Young))
Voiced by (Japanese): Yuri Tabata (RE7 (Old Woman)), Sumire Morohoshi (RE7 (Young))

Eveline is the main antagonist of Resident Evil 7: Biohazard. Initially presented to the player as the catatonic elder of the Baker family, Eveline is later revealed to be a genetically enhanced human, an "E-Class" bio organic weapon (B.O.W.) codenamed "E-001" and the first successful E-Class prototype. She infects her victims using mold and fungus, allowing her to create a legion of people that she perceives as her "family", and thereby command and convert them into the "Molded". Years before the game begins, Eveline is transported overseas by Mia and the terrorist group known as the Connections, only for her to go rogue, infect most of the ship's population, and crash the ship near the Baker estate. After Jack rescues Mia and Eveline, she uses her power to take control over Mia and the Bakers as her adopted family, making them regard her as a child even though she is now old. In addition to turning all of them, save for Zoe, into sociopathic monsters, Eveline has the Bakers kidnap people and drag them to the Baker estate, where they are either killed, or transformed into Molded.

Once Ethan arrives at the Baker estate, he is assisted by Zoe. When he finally learns of Eveline's origins, he used the equipment in the lab deep in the nearby Salt Mines to develop a necrotoxin using Eveline's DNA to kill her. He succeeds in injecting Eveline with the necrotoxin, disrupting the hallucination concealing the aged woman she became before mutating into a giant grotesque form as her powers spiral out of control. With the help from Chris Redfield and Blue Umbrella, Ethan kills Eveline.

A ghostly apparition of Eveline appears before Ethan during the events of Resident Evil Village after Miranda ripped his heart, tormenting Ethan by revealing that he was killed by Jack Baker and only survived because he was infected with her mold. She later appears years later before Rose within the Mutamycete, a fungus, during events of Shadows of Rose, attempting to kill the teen out of jealousy towards her.

== Reception ==
The Bakers have had a positive reception as characters. Andy Kelly of PC Gamer considered the Bakers to be "instantly, disgustingly iconic" monsters who are not only the entire franchise's most realized villains to date, but also "the vast majority of horror games in general". Polygon staff described both Jack and Marguerite Baker as among the best video game characters of the 2010s. In his review of Resident Evil 7 for Game Informer, Andrew Reiner remarked that the Bakers are as equally important to the game's story as they are to the Resident Evil franchise's re-establishment of its traditional conventions and lore. He felt that while none of the Bakers stood out to him as particularly important or iconic villains for the franchise, they were nevertheless "interesting in their own disturbing ways" and emphasized that the "threat they pose is greater than their personalities" given their capabilities and their persistent reappearances. IGN staff named Marguerite as one of the best Resident Evil bosses of all time. Reid McCarter of GameSpot praised a jump scare scene involving Jack as one of the scariest moments in video game history, with Tamoor Hussain calling it "a fantastic set-piece that built tension and then expertly leveraged it for a cinematic moment".

Some video game journalists credit Ethan's struggles against the Bakers, as well as the effective use of negative stereotypes of White Southerners to be effective factors behind the critical acclaim and commercial success of Resident Evil 7. Ray Porreca from Destructoid in particular described the Bakers to be the "heart" of the game, and posited that "it's not difficult to picture them sitting around on a Sunday, chomping on raw flesh while bickering about chores", and that "Jack, Marguerite, and Lucas come across as the personification of Southern country evil". Susan Arendt from GamesRadar+ opined that the developers subverted preconceived notions among North Americans of a common fear of rural areas and a "Southern accent with behavior that defies reason" to deliver an "immediate sense of dread and fear" with a compelling narrative twist.

Audric Figueroa from The Escapist and Zoe Delahunty-Light from GamesRadar+ found themselves moved by the late-game reveal of the Bakers as originally sympathetic figures who only commit acts of depravity as a result of Eveline's influence on their minds. Both applauded an important cutscene which recasts Jack as a mild-mannered man who pleads for forgiveness and asks Ethan not to judge their tormentor too harshly. Figueroa noted that the game's focus on the theme of family made its horror personal, and the empathy generated for a character players originally thought of as "an abusive, backwoods cannibal" became a catalyst for anguish and increases the player's emotional investment in the story. Arendt noted that the game feeds the player's fears about unsavory Southern stereotypes by setting up the horrible realization that the Bakers are themselves fellow victims of Eveline due to their hospitable attitude towards strangers. Delahunty-Light remarked that genuine horror is beyond the immediate threat of death, and argued that one has to be complicit in things that terrify them to be truly immersed in it. She remarked that when the player as the hunted Ethan turns the tables on his hunters Jack and Marguerite, they themselves become part of the "cycle of evil".

Some commentators also described the Baker's bayou estate as an essential core element of the game. Calling the Bakers' property a "disgusting, oppressive house" littered with filth, junk, dried blood, and dirt stain faded wallpaper, Porreca praised the developers' attention to detail through the "stark contrast" between Ethan's smart attire and the Bakers' "chaotic existence" Reid McCarter from PC Gamer said the level of detail which went into the presentation of the Baker home amplified Jack's effectiveness as a formidable and scary villain. Reiner said that "part of the fun of the house is getting to know the Bakers from their possessions and hobbies". He considered the prominent depiction of the Bakers' love of football to be the game's "weirdest bit of fiction", noting the jarring sight of "a vibrant, purple bobblehead toy sitting in a room full of gore". Alice Bell of VideoGamer.com considered the game's best character to be the house, moreso than the Baker family themselves; she opined that it is easy to interpret it as sentient, with the Bakers as its "immune system defense" against intruders. However, she also noted an alternate interpretation, that the Bakers are merely symptoms of the virus attacking the house, with the safe rooms being the house's attempt to cure itself. Gareth Damian Martin of Eurogamer noted that the house echoes Spencer Mansion with its layout as well as various Easter eggs that could be found within. Calling the similarities "eerie", he noted that the game deliberately subverted the player's expectations of what would happen when navigating its hallways and rooms.

The dinner table scene with the Baker family has been described as the most overt example of the game's narrative mirroring specific scenes from the 1974 film The Texas Chain Saw Massacre.

== Bibliography ==
- Capcom (2020). Resident Evil 7: Biohazard Document File. Dark Horse Books. ISBN 978-1-5067-2166-8.
- McGreevy, Alan; Fawcett, Christina; Ouellette, Marc (2020). Arno Görgen; Stefan Heinrich Simond (eds.). Krankheit in Digitalen Spielen: Interdisziplinäre Betrachtungen. transcript-Verlag. The House and the Infected Body: The Metonymy of RESIDENT EVIL 7. ISBN 978-3-8376-5328-1.
