= Winter (disambiguation) =

Winter is one of the four temperate seasons.

Winter may also refer to:

== Places ==
- Winter, Saskatchewan, Canada
- Winter, West Virginia
- Winter (town), Wisconsin, U.S.
  - Winter, Wisconsin, U.S., a village within the town
- Winters, California, U.S.
- Winters, Michigan, U.S., a former post office in Rock River Township, Michigan
- Winters, Texas, U.S.
- Winter (MBTA station), a station in Downtown Crossing
- Winter Building, a historic building in Montgomery, Alabama, U.S.

== People ==
- Winter (given name)
- Winter (surname)
- Winters (name), a surname
- Winter (programmer), freelance software programmer and consultant Rafael Antonio Lozano Jr. (born 1972), legally changed his name to Winter
- Winter (singer), stage name of Kim Min-jeong (born 2001), a member of the South Korean girl group Aespa
- Winter (wrestler), a ring name of Katarina Waters (born 1980), German-born English professional wrestler

== Animals ==
- Winter (dolphin), a dolphin with a prosthetic tail, subject of the 2011 movie Dolphin Tale
- Winter (horse), a racehorse who won the 2017 1000 Guineas Stakes
- Winter (llama), a Belgian llama used in antibody research

== Art, entertainment, and media ==
=== Fictional entities ===
- Winter, a planet in Ursula K. Le Guin's novel The Left Hand of Darkness (1969)
- Winter (Star Wars), a character in the Star Wars universe
- Winter Anderson, from American Horror Story: Cult played by Billie Lourd
- Winter Santiaga, the main character in the 1999 novel The Coldest Winter Ever by Sister Souljah
- Winter Schnee, a minor character from the web series RWBY

=== Films ===
- Winter (1930 film), a Silly Symphonies animated Disney short
- Winter (2002 film), an Italian romance-drama film
- Winter (2009 film), a Malayalam horror film
- The Winter (2013 film), Greek film with Vangelis Mourikis
- El invierno, The Winter 2016 Argentine film

=== Literature ===
- "Winter" (poem), by Mehdi Akhavan-Sales
- Winter, a 1974 book by Morley Callaghan
- Winter (Deighton novel), 1987, by Len Deighton
- Winter (Marsden novel), 2000, by John Marsden
- Winter (Meyer novel), 2015, by Marissa Meyer
- Winter (Smith novel), 2017, by Ali Smith
- Winter: Five Windows on the Season, the 2011 Massey Lectures by Adam Gopnik

=== Music ===
==== Groups and labels ====
- Winter (metal band), a death/doom metal band
- Winter (indie rock band), an American pop band fronted by Samira Winter
- Winter & Winter Records, a record label

==== Albums ====
- Winter (Akdong Musician album), 2017
- Winter (New Model Army album), 2016
- Winter (Steeleye Span album), 2004
- Winter/Reflections, by Boyz II Men, 2005
- The Winter. From 2001, by Nowfolk (Ishkan and Moka Only), 2016

==== EPs ====
- Winter (Jon Foreman EP), 2008
- Winter (MBLAQ EP), 2014
- Winter, by Subtle, 2002

==== Songs ====
- "Winter" (Amebix song), 1983
- "Winter" (Love and Money song), 1991
- "Winter" (Rolling Stones song), 1973
- "Winter" (Tori Amos song), 1992
- "Winter" (U2 song), 2009
- "Winter" (Unheilig song), 2010
- "Winter (Winter Rose / Duet)", by Tohoshinki, 2011
- "Winter", signature song of Iranian singer Afshin Moghaddam
- "Winter", by Bayside from Acoustic
- "Winter", by Benee from Hey U X, featuring Mallrat, 2020
- "Winter", by Dreamcatcher from Apocalypse: Save Us, 2022
- "Winter", by The Fall from Hex Enduction Hour
- "Winter", by Joshua Radin from We Were Here
- "Winter", by Judas Priest from Rocka Rolla
- "Winter", by K's Choice from The Great Subconscious Club
- "Winter", by Khalid from American Teen
- "Winter", by Pvris from All We Know of Heaven, All We Need of Hell
- "Winter", by Teenage Fanclub from Songs from Northern Britain
- "Winter", by TV on the Radio from Seeds
- "Winter" ("L'inverno"), a concerto from Vivaldi's The Four Seasons

=== Television ===
- Winter (Australian TV series), a 2015 mystery thriller, a spin-off from the telemovie The Killing Field
- Winter (British TV series), a 2026 police procedural, an adaptation of the French series Balthazar
- "Winter" (Big Love), a 2011 episode

=== Other art, entertainment, and media ===
- Winter (video game), a survival horror game for the Wii
- Winter (Purvītis), a 1910 painting by Vilhelms Purvītis
- Winter (sculpture), cast by Jean-Antoine Houdon

== Other uses ==
- Winter (Fabergé egg), a jeweled Easter egg designed in 1913
- Winter, a complexion type in skin tone color matching
- Winter, the brand name of a 1900s British automobile manufactured by W.W.

== See also ==
- Category:Winter, Wikimedia category
- de Winter, a surname
- Wynter (disambiguation)
- Winters (disambiguation)
- Vinter (disambiguation)
