= Stiletto Spy School =

- Founded: May 2008
- Founder: Alana Winter
- Headquarters: New York City, Las Vegas, United States
- Website: www.stilettospyschool.com

Stiletto Spy School is an espionage training school for women. Established in May 2008 by Alana Winter, the school has locations in New York City and Las Vegas. The school teaches self-empowerment for women, covering survival skills, self-defense, and gun handling, along with less combat-oriented courses, such as mixing martinis, poker playing and "seduction skills". The same company also runs an equivalent school for men, the MI6 Academy.
