= Geoffrey Winters =

English composer and music educationalist

Geoffrey Walter Horace Winters (born 17 October 1928) is a British composer and music educationalist. His works span from large-scale orchestral and concertante pieces (including two symphonies and the Violin Concerto), to chamber and instrumental works and pedagogical music for children.

== Early life and career ==
Born in Chingford, Winters is the son of carver and letter designer Leo Hill Winters, and he served a brief apprenticeship with his father from the age of 17. (His brother, Eric Winters, became a sculptor). As a child, however, he showed promise as a pianist, and in 1945 he was accepted as a student at the Royal Academy of Music, where his tutors were Felix Swinstead (piano) and Priaulx Rainier (composition), and later Alan Bush. A trio of early works - the Wind Quartet, Op. 1, the symphonic, three movement Yorkshire Suite, Op. 2, and the Toccata for piano, Op. 3 - give an indication of his future range as a composer. In 1952 Winters took up the position of music teacher at Larkswood School, Chingford. He continued teaching and lecturing, including spells at Gipsy Hill College and Hertfordshire College of Higher Education, until his retirement in 1977.

During the 1950s Winters became interested in 12 tone music. The Piano Sonata, Op. 12, first performed by Eric Parkin at the Macnaghten Concerts in 1958, came out of this period. Within a few years, however, from the Variations for Two Pianos, Op. 19, he had returned to a more tonal, neo-classical style, with Prokofiev and Shostakovich among the influences. The First Symphony, composed in 1961, was performed by Owain Arwel Hughes with the New Philharmonia Orchestra at the Royal Festival Hall on 4 October 1973, and lasts 16 minutes. The more expansive Second Symphony was first performed by the Guildhall School of Music Graduate Orchestra in 1978.

== Freelance composer ==
While in Chingford Winters lived at 4, Victoria Road. After retirement from teaching he moved to the village of Semer, near Hadleigh in Suffolk, to concentrate on freelance composition. The Violin Concerto, composed in 1974, received its premiere a decade later in Lavenham Church, on 16 September 1984, performed by Jessie Ridley with the Lavenham Sinfonia Orchestra, conducted by Frederick Marshall. Other works composed in Suffolk include the Studies from a Rainbow for piano, Op. 70, the Tributaries for solo harp, Op. 79, Mutations for two trumpets (1988) and Summer Songs for chorus, Op. 90.

Winters has also composed pieces and written course work for educational use, published by Longman, such as Sounds and Music, Books 1-3 and (from the mid-1980s) Listen, Compose, Perform, produced to support the new GCSE Music examination. He is the author of Musical Instruments in the Classroom (1972). He wrote about educational music for Tempo magazine in the 1960s and 1970s. The Variations for Two Pianos Op. 19 was given its world premiere by Claire and Antoinette Cann in Cambridge on 2 October 2008, nearly fifty years after it had been composed.

== Personal life ==
Winters met his wife, the pianist Christine Ive, at the Royal Academy, and they married in 1947. There are two sons (Alan, an economist, and John) and a daughter Anne. His wife died in 2006. His memoirs were published in 2008.

== Selected works ==
- 24 Preludes for piano (1947)
- Wind Quartet, Op. 1 (1949)
- Yorkshire Suite for orchestra, Op. 2 (1949)
- A River Pastoral for orchestra, Op. 7 (1954)
- Viola Sonata No. 1, Op. 8 (1955)
- String Quartet No. 1, Op. 10 (1956)
- Piano Sonata, Op. 12 (1958)
- Concertino for piano, horn and strings, Op. 18
- Variations for two pianos, Op. 19 (1960)
- String Quartet No. 2, Op. 21 (1960)
- Symphony No. 1 Op. 23 (1961)
- Aspects for flute, clarinet, horn and harp (1961)
- Flute Sonatina (1965)
- Piano Sonatina (1966)
- Thames Journey, song cycle for junior voices and ensemble, Op. 31 (1967)
- Violin Sonata (1967)
- Violin Concerto, Op. 51 (1974)
- The Mind of Man for chorus and orchestra, Op. 52 (1975)
- Symphony No. 2, Op. 55 (1977)
- Viola Sonata No. 2, Op. 57 (1978)
- Five Epigrams for string quartet, Op. 62 (1978)
- Studies from a Rainbow for piano, Op. 71 (1981)
- Mutations for two trumpets (1988)
- Summer Songs for chorus and piano, Op. 90 (1990)
