= De Winter =

De Winter is a Dutch surname. Notable people with the surname include:

De Winter or de Winter:

- Alfons De Winter (1908–1997), Belgian footballer
- Allister de Winter (born 1968), Australian cricketer
- Arie de Winter (1915–1983), Dutch football player
- August De Winter (1925–2005), Belgian politician
- Bernard de Winter (1924–2017), South African botanist
- Brenno de Winter (born 1971), Dutch technology and investigative journalist
- Jan Willem de Winter (1761–1812), Dutch admiral of the Napoleonic Wars
- Jo De Winter (1914–2004), American television actress
- Koni De Winter (born 2002), Belgian footballer
- Leon de Winter (born 1954), Dutch writer and columnist
- Ludwig De Winter (born 1992), Belgian racing cyclist
- Melise de Winter (born 1968), Dutch voice actress
- Solomonica de Winter (born 1997), Dutch writer
- Yves De Winter (born 1987), Belgian football goalkeeper

Dewinter or deWinter:

- Filip Dewinter (born 1962), Belgian Flemish nationalist politician
- Simon Dewinter (1908–1972), Belgian boxer

== Fictional characters ==
- Milady de Winter, antagonist in the novel The Three Musketeers (1844) by Alexandre Dumas
- Three characters in Daphne du Maurier's 1938 novel Rebecca, its 1940 film adaptation, and Susan Hill's 1993 sequel novel Mrs de Winter:
  - Maximillian de Winter, owner of Manderley
  - Rebecca de Winter, unseen titular character and Max's deceased first wife
  - Mrs. de Winter, narrator of the original novel and Max's second wife

== See also ==
- Winter (disambiguation)
- Winter (surname)
- Winters (surname)
