= Vinter =

Vinter is the Danish, Norwegian and Swedish word for winter. It is also a surname derived from the word.

== Notable people with the surname ==
- Aleksander Vinter (born 1987), known as Savant, Norwegian electronic musician
- Alexander Vinter (1878–1958), Russian scientist and engineer
- Endri Vinter (born 1993), Estonian swimmer
- John Alfred Vinter (1828–1905), British painter
- Gilbert Vinter (1909–1969), English conductor and composer
- Julie Vinter Hansen (1890–1960), Danish astronomer
- Mick Vinter (1954–2020), English footballer
- Robert Vinter (fl. 1388), English politician
- Ülo Vinter (1924–2000), Estonian composer

== See also ==
- Vinter's Theatre, the name used for the Private Opera in Moscow between 1896 and 1899
- Lorenzo Vintter (1842–1915), Argentinian military officer
- Vinters, a surname
- Vinther, a surname
- Vintner (winemaker)
- Winter (disambiguation)
