= Vinters =

Vinters is a Latvian surname. Notable people with the surname include:

- Edgars Vinters (1919–2014), Latvian painter
- Jānis Vinters (born 1971), Latvian motorcycle racer and farmer

== See also ==
- Vinter
- Vintner (winemaker)
- Winters (disambiguation)
