= Wynter (disambiguation) =

Wynter Gordon (born 1985) is an American singer.

Wynter may also refer to:

== People ==
- Wynter (surname)

== Other ==
- Wynter, a Marvel Comics character who is part of Gene Nation

== See also ==
- Winter (disambiguation)
