= David Winter =

David Winter may refer to:

- David A. Winter (1930–2012), Canadian kinesiologist
- David Alexandre Winter (born 1943), Dutch-born pop singer
- David Winter, character in 2007 American horror film The Reaping
- David Winter (sculptor) (born 1958), English miniature building sculptor
- David Winter (actor) (born 1979), German actor

== See also ==
- David Winters (disambiguation)
