= William Gurnall =

English author and Anglican clergyman

William Gurnall (1616 – 12 October 1679) was an English author and Anglican clergyman born at King's Lynn, Norfolk, where he was baptised on 17 November 1616.

He was educated at the free grammar school of his native town, and in 1631 was nominated to the Lynn scholarship in Emmanuel College, Cambridge, where he graduated BA in 1635 and MA in 1639. He was made rector of St Peter and St Paul's Church, Lavenham in Suffolk in 1644; and before he received that appointment he seems to have officiated, perhaps as curate, at Sudbury.

At the Restoration he signed the declaration required by the Act of Uniformity 1662, and on this account he was the subject of a libellous attack, published in 1665, entitled Covenant-Renouncers Desperate Apostates.

== Christian in Complete Armour ==
Gurnall is known by his Christian in Complete Armour, published in three volumes, dated 1655, 1658 and 1662. It consists of sermons or lectures delivered by the author in the course of his regular ministry, in a consecutive course on Ephesians 6: 10–20. It is described as a magazine whence the Christian is furnished with spiritual arms for the battle, helped on with his armour, and taught the use of his weapon; together with the happy issue of the whole war. It is thus considered a classic on spiritual warfare. (Note: The subtitle of the book is: The saint's war against the Devil, wherein a discovery is made of that grand enemy of God and his people, in his policies, power, seat of his empire, wickedness, and chief design he hath against the saints; a magazine opened, from whence the Christian is furnished with spiritual arms for the battle, helped on with his armour, and taught the use of his weapon; together with the happy issue of the whole war.) The work is more practical than theological; and its style and its fervent religious tone continued to render it still popular with some readers. Richard Baxter and John Flavel both thought highly of the book. Toplady used to make copious extracts from it in his common-place book. John Newton, the converted slave trader, said that if he were confined to one book beside the Bible, he'd choose Christian Armour. Richard Cecil spent many of the last days of his life in reading it, and repeatedly expressed his admiration of it. Charles Haddon Spurgeon commented that Gurnall's work is "peerless and priceless; every line full of wisdom. The book has been preached over scores of times and is, in our judgment, the best thought-breeder in all our library." In 1988 Banner of Truth Trust published a revised and abridged version in contemporary English.

== Works ==
- The Christian in Complete Armour, Diggory Press, ISBN 978-1-84685-795-9
- Gurnall, William (1964). The Christian in Complete Armour. Banner of Truth Trust. ISBN 0-85151-196-1.
- The Christian's Labour and Reward
- " The Christian in Complete Armour", Daily readings in Spiritual Warfare, Edited by James S Bell, Jr. Moody Publishers, ISBN 978-0-8024-1177-8

== Sources ==
- H. Keon, An Inquiry into the Life of the Rev. W. Gurnall, 1830
- John Charles Ryle, Introduction to the Christian in Complete Armour, 1865
