= David Winters =

David Winters may refer to:

== People ==
- David Winters (footballer) (born 1983), Scottish footballer
- David Winters (choreographer) (1939-2019), British-born American film director, producer, choreographer, and actor
- Dave Winters (born 1952), American politician
- David Winters, American naval officer and technologist who introduced Over-the-air rekeying

== Characters ==
- David Winters, fictional character portrayed by Paul Petersen in the 1958 film Houseboat
- David Winters, fictional character portrayed by Christopher Plummer in the 2008 film Emotional Arithmetic

== See also ==
- David Winter (disambiguation)
