= Eric Winters =

British sculptor (1921–1968)

- Born: Eric Lee Winters; 21 January 1921; London, England
- Died: 1968 (aged 46–47); London, England
- Occupation: Sculptor

Eric Lee Winters (21 January 1921 – 1968) was a British sculptor, the son of carver and letter designer Leo Hill Winters. He studied at Saint Martin's School of Art and won a scholarship to attend the Royal Academy Sculpture School in 1939. This was interrupted by the war, but Winter resumed his course there from 1947 until 1952.

== Life and career ==
Winters was part of the sculpture event in the art competition at the 1948 Summer Olympics. His work was mostly focused on portrait busts, including sports personalities such as the Northern Ireland football player Danny Blanchflower. He lived in Suffolk, and fashioned the figures of St Peter and St Paul over the porch at Lavenham Church.

His brother, the composer Geoffrey Winters, dedicated his Violin Concerto to the memory of Eric Winters
