= Winter, West Virginia =

Winter
- Unincorporated community
- Location within the state of West Virginia Winter (the United States)
- Coordinates: 38°30′34″N 81°44′50″W
- Country: United States
- State: West Virginia
- County: Putnam
- Elevation: 709 ft (216 m)
- Time zone: UTC-5 (Eastern (EST))
  - Summer (DST): UTC-4 (EDT)
- GNIS ID: 1556012

Winter is an unincorporated community in Putnam County, West Virginia, United States.
