= Melise de Winter =

Dutch voice actress

Melise de Winter (born 18 February 1968) is a Dutch voice actress. She plays Disney's Minnie Mouse, Pinkie Pie in My Little Pony: Friendship is Magic, Mandy in Totally Spies! and Shin Chan in the Japanese anime Shin Chan.

== Biography ==
Melise de Winter was born on 18 February 1968. After attending a dance academy in Arnhem, de Winter moved to Amsterdam. Since 2002, she has been working as a voice actress, mainly dubbing adverts and cartoons, but also providing the Dutch-language voiceovers for popular toys.

== Filmography ==
Animation

- Mickey Mouse Clubhouse - Minnie Mouse
- My Little Pony: Friendship is Magic - Pinkie Pie
- PAW Patrol - Zuma
- Totally Spies! - Mandy, Phoebe, Normy, additional roles
- W.I.T.C.H. - Elyon
- Winx Club - Chimera
