= Vinther =

Origin
- Origin: 1273
- Meaning: Vintner, a person who makes wine
- Region of origin: England

Other names
- Variant form: Numerous

Vinther (also spelled Winther) is a common Anglo-Germanic surname dating back to the 13th century. The name developed from the Anglo-French word Vintner, meaning someone who is involved with winemaking. The surname is used worldwide, but is mainly found in Europe and the United States.

== Etymology ==
=== History ===
The surname Vinther dates back to 13th century England and derives from the Anglo-French word Vintner, meaning a person engaged in winemaking. In Denmark and Norway, it was originally given to people considered to possess a frosty or gloomy temperament.

== Usage ==
Vinther is the 141,009th most common surname in the world. It is most prevalent in Denmark and the highest density is in the Faroe Islands.

Country	Incidence	Frequency	Rank in Nation	Ref.
Denmark	4,239	1,330	106	
United States	142	2,255,424	144,605	
England	75	720,000	50,317	
Faroe Islands	49	987	130	
Norway	39	131,394	17,488	
Switzerland	27	302,256	36,547	
Sweden	22	440,645	42,407	
Canada	9	3,936,392	212,166	
New Zealand	5	909,350	46,707	
Spain	2	23,253,900	131,225	
India	2	624,010,000	1,500,361	
Israel	2	4,103,200	34,572	
Poland	1	38,496,000	58,885	
El Salvador	1	6,401,240	3,993	
France	1	65,959,000	277,603	
South Africa	1	54,002,000	107,212	
Russia	1	146,068,400	897,276	
Germany	1	80,716,000	172,258	
Hong Kong	1	7,219,700	16,640	
Australia	1	23,566,200	279,271	
United Arab Emirates	1	9,446,000	83,428	
Tunisia	1	10,886,500	14,644	
Netherlands	1	16,863,800	118,015	
Belgium	1	11,202,066	91,024	

== Notable people with the surname ==
Name	Country	Years	Notes	Ref.
Ingeborg Vinther	Faroe Islands	b. 1945	Politician	
Johannes Vinther	Denmark	b. 1893 d. 1968	Gymnast	
Troels Vinther	Denmark	b. 1987	Cyclist	
Aage Winther-Jørgensen	Denmark	b. 1900 d. 1967	Actor	
Andrine Winther	Sweden	b. 1977	Politician	
Birgitte Winther	Denmark	b. 1751 d. 1809	Opera singer	
Christian Winther	Denmark	b. 1796 d. 1876	Lyric poet	
Christopher Winther Scheen	Norway	b. 1809 d. 1950	Clergyman and politician	
Felix Winther	Denmark	b. 2000	Footballer	
Gregers Winther Wulfsberg	Norway	b. 1780 d. 1846	Jurist and politician	
Gregers Winther Wulfsberg Gram	Norway	b. 1846 d. 1929	Jurist, politician and international arbitrator	
Lars Winther	Norway	b. 1983	Pianist composer	
Ludwig Franz Alexander Winther	Germany	b. 1812 d. 1871	Pathologist and ophthalmologist	
Oscar Osburn Winther	United States	b. 1903 d. 1970	History professor	
Sophus Keith Winther	United States	b. 1893 d. 1983	Professor and novelist	
Eva Winther	Sweden	b. 1921 d. 2014	Politician	
Torben Winther	Denmark	b. 1949	Handball coach	

== See also ==
- Nielsen & Winther Type AA
- Winther (automobile)

== Sources ==
=== Printed ===
- Hirschberg, Julius (1986). The History Of Ophthalmology. Wayenborgh. ISBN 0-79232-053-0.
- Holme, Jørn (2014). They Came from Everywhere: The Eidsvoll Men And Their Houses. Cappelen Damm. ISBN 978-82-02-44564-5.
- Kurath, Hans (1999). Middle English Dictionary. University of Michigan. ISBN 978-0472012251.
- Nauright, John; Parrish, Charles (2012). Sports Around The World: History, Culture, And Practice. ABC-CLIO. ISBN 978-1598843002.
- Thomsen, Mads (2008). Mapping World Literature: International Canonization And Transnational Literatures. A&C Black. ISBN 978-1847061232.

=== Online ===
- "Aage Winther-Jørgensen". Danish Film Institute.
- "Christopher Winther Scheen" (in Norwegian). Norwegian Social Science Data Services. Archived from the original on March 5, 2016.
- "GP Herning Winner Troels Vinther Signs One Year Deal With Saxo Bank SunGard". Velonation.
- "Gregers Winther Wulfsberg" (in Norwegian). Grand Norwegian Encyclopedia.
- "Ingeborg Vinter (1945 - )". Dansk kvindebiografisk leksikon.
- "Nordic By Nature By Lars Winther". Jazz Review.
- "Sophus Keith Winther Collection". Danish-American Archive and Library.
- "Vinther Surname Meaning & Statistics". Forebears.
- "Vinter". The Internet Surname Database.
