= Ethan Winters =

Character in Resident Evil

- Ethan as he appears in Resident Evil Village (2021)
- First appearance: Resident Evil 7: Biohazard (2017)
- Created by: Capcom
- Voiced by: English Todd Soley; Japanese Hidenobu Kiuchi
- Motion capture: Yaya Chamki

In-universe information
- Spouse: Mia Winters
- Children: Rosemary Winters

Ethan Winters (Note: Japanese: イーサン・ウィンターズ, Hepburn: Īsan Wintāzu) is a character in Resident Evil (Biohazard in Japan), a survival horror video game series created by the Japanese company Capcom. Ethan was introduced as the main playable character in the 2017 video game Resident Evil 7: Biohazard, in which he is depicted as an ordinary civilian searching for his missing wife within a ruined estate in Louisiana. He returned in the 2021 sequel Resident Evil Village, where he searches for his kidnapped daughter in a mysterious European village.

Originally designed as an unseen "everyman" protagonist to represent the player's viewpoint, the character's story was expanded for his return in Village. He is voiced by Hidenobu Kiuchi in Japanese and Todd Soley in English. Ethan has received a mixed reception from video game publications. Several journalists have praised his relatability, while others have criticized him for a lack of emotional range and character development.

== Conception and creation ==
In Resident Evil 7: Biohazard (2017), players take Ethan's viewpoint from a first-person perspective. While the Resident Evil series had become more action-oriented in some releases, Resident Evil 7: Biohazard was designed as a return to survival elements with limited resources. According to Morimasa Sato, who was a writer for Resident Evil 7 and the director of Resident Evil Village (2021), the development team initially thought of Ethan as merely "a camera for the player" and "transparent", while scriptwriter Antony Johnston said "It's a balancing act between giving Ethan his own personality, but also helping the player imagine that it could be them, reacting in the same way."

Towards the end of development for Resident Evil 7: Biohazard, its developers began planning for the next mainline Resident Evil game. The developers decided to make it a direct continuation of Resident Evil 7 and Ethan's story arc, having developed an attachment to him and seeing potential in his character. Producer Peter Fabiano stated that the team wanted players to experience Village from Ethan's perspective. Sato described "Village" as the story of Ethan and "the entirety of who he is."

Ethan's face is never shown within the gameplay for Resident Evil 7 or Resident Evil Village due to players controlling Ethan from a first-person perspective. However, the team did create facial features for his character model, which can be seen by other artists and modders. An unused version of Ethan's character model, hidden within the game's assets, has fully developed facial features. In the expansion "Shadows of Rose" for Resident Evil Village, Ethan appears in a third-person mode and despite attempts to obscure his face, players could see it by performing certain actions. (Note: In 2022, despite third-person mode being included in the chapter, Ethan's face is still hidden.)

Ethan was voiced by American actor Todd Soley for Resident Evil 7: Biohazard and Resident Evil Village and by Hidenobu Kiuchi in the Japanese versions of the games. Ethan's appearance was based on Tunisian model Yaya Chamki.

== Appearances ==
=== Resident Evil 7: Biohazard ===
Ethan first appears in Resident Evil 7: Biohazard (2017), where he searches in Louisiana for his wife, Mia, after her abduction by the Baker family. After he finds Mia, they attempt to flee, but she abruptly becomes violent and dismembers Ethan's hand with a chainsaw. He is captured by Jack Baker and forced to join a family dinner, after which he escapes and kills Jack and his wife Marguerite. Ethan later discovers that the Baker family has been under the control of the game's main antagonist, Eveline, a powerful genetically engineered bio-weapon. Later, he crafts a necrotoxin then stabs it into Eveline before she mutates into a giant monster. Ethan finally destroys Eveline with assistance from a paramilitary company led by Chris Redfield. Ethan and Mia then escape the plantation.

=== Resident Evil Village ===
Ethan returns in Resident Evil Village (2021) as its central character. Three years after the events of the previous game, Ethan and Mia are living in Europe with their newborn daughter, Rosemary. Chris Redfield storms the house suddenly and kills Mia while taking Ethan and Rosemary into custody. While Ethan and Rosemary are being transported in a van, a mysterious entity crashes it just outside the village. Ethan ends up in a remote village, where he looks for his daughter. Ethan soon discovers that the person shot was not Mia, but a disguised cult leader known as Mother Miranda. Miranda appears and kills Ethan after he beats the village's four Lords. She tells him that she intends to use Rosemary to bring back her daughter, Eva, who died from the Spanish flu. Later, Ethan discovers that he had died during his initial meeting with Jack Baker in Resident Evil 7, but the mold—a kind of fungus used to create humanoid creatures—had given him the capacity to regenerate. After regaining consciousness, Ethan kills Miranda and saves his daughter. As Ethan's body begins to deteriorate, he sacrifices himself and gives Rosemary to Chris, who makes it to a helicopter before Ethan detonates a bomb to destroy the village.

Sixteen years after the events of Resident Evil Village, the DLC expansion Shadows of Rose focuses on Rosemary's teenage experience with her molded powers as the result of the mutated fungus, Megamycete. Ethan, who initially appears to her as golden lettering, helps her on her mission. He takes physical form during Rosemary's battle with Eveline, in a scene filled with swift cuts that hide his face from the player. At the end, Rosemary expresses her gratitude for her father and his sacrifice, and Ethan sees that his daughter has grown up safely. Rose later visits Ethan's grave on his birthday before heading off in a car with an unnamed organization.

=== Promotion and merchandise ===
To promote Village, Capcom featured a discussion of Ethan in a September 2020 developer diary titled "The Making of Resident Evil Village: Winter Comes for Ethan", wherein staff members discuss Ethan's role within the game. The Resident Evil Village Deluxe Edition is bundled with an art book titled "The Tragedy of Ethan Winters". In addition, Epic Games included Ethan in a 2021 fan survey about potential crossover characters to be featured in Fortnite (2017).

== Critical reception ==
Ethan has received positive reviews from critics for his role as a relatable "everyman". Chris Moyse from Destructoid and Liana Ruppert from Game Informer credited the character's role in Resident Evil 7 as a factor behind the video game's popularity and ongoing commercial success. Josh West from GamesRadar+ noted that Ethan became the first Resident Evil protagonist to return for a direct sequel, hailing the move as unprecedented. Ray Porreca of Destructoid thought that Ethan's clean-cut attire was a sharp contrast with the "murky" environments of Resident Evil 7, praising his markedly different style compared to previous protagonists of the series. Porreca described Ethan as at odds with conventional Resident Evil protagonists, being an unskilled everyman who survives against overwhelming odds and thereby subverting player's expectations of "a game Resident Evil 7". The Escapist's Audric Figueroa also compared the character with past entries, highlighting Ethan's personal connection to Mia rather than another protagonist connected to law enforcement. Figueroa suggested that a mundane family man who is eager to rescue his wife is the "perfect protagonist" for the story, where domestic violence both "literal and metaphorical" forms the core of the game's "encounter philosophy".

In contrast, several reviewers have criticized Ethan for his lack of personality and character development. Game Informer's Andrew Reiner criticized the mismatch between Ethan's occasional reactions versus his otherwise silent nature, calling him "as transparent as the specters he encounters". Gene Park of The Washington Post called Ethan an "idiot" for his reactions to the events of Village, arguing that Ethan "has no character arc" and "isn't likely to enter the pantheon of great video game characters." Hannes Rossow from GamePro felt that Ethan lacked personality and dampened his enjoyment of the games, expressing desire for a protagonist with more character. Ashley Bardhan from Kotaku compared Ethan to James Sunderland from Silent Hill, criticizing both characters for being "bumbling" and "regrettably uninteresting" to the extent that she was unable to find anything about them to care about compared to their missing wives. Matthew Bryd of Den of Geek felt Ethan was the worst protagonist of a Resident Evil title and even gaming in general, citing "bad voice acting, bad writing, and questionable lore", as well as further character flaws. Conversely, Andy Kelly from PC Gamer, Josh Broadwell from Polygon, and Jade King from TheGamer opined that being "boring" or "generic" is Ethan's most positive contribution to the player's gameplay experience, given the context of the dangerous environments and characters he faces.

As a result of Ethan's faceless presentation and lack of background information provided by Capcom, he is often discussed in fan theories about his true nature. Ian Walker from Kotaku was amused by Capcom's persistent attempts to hide Ethan's face behind the weapons he wields within promotional art. GamePro's Hannes Rossow called the attempts to maintain the illusion of Ethan as a faceless character absurd, as the character's actual face is known to exist within the game assets of Resident Evil 7. Moises Taveras of Paste did not feel that Ethan belonged in the game world due to his lack of physical appearance.

Some journalists have noted a tendency throughout the games for Ethan to suffer from serious injury or complete dismemberment of his limbs, particularly his hands, then quickly heal or re-attach them with little effort. In her discussion of allusions between Resident Evil 7 and horror cinema as part of the former's use of intertextuality, Dawn Stobbart described multiple instances where Ethan's journey mirrors that of scenes from the 1974 film The Texas Chain Saw Massacre. Ethan's predicament during the dinner table scene with the Baker family is analyzed as the most overt example: like recurring The Texas Chain Saw Massacre franchise character Sally Hardesty, Ethan is seated at the foot of the table as he awakens to a grotesque feast seemingly made from human entrails.
