= Winters =

Winters may refer to:

- Winters (name), a surname
- Winters, California, a town in California, U.S.
- Winters, Texas, a town in Texas, U.S.
- Winter, a season

== See also ==
- Winter (disambiguation)
