= St Peter and St Paul's Church, Lavenham =

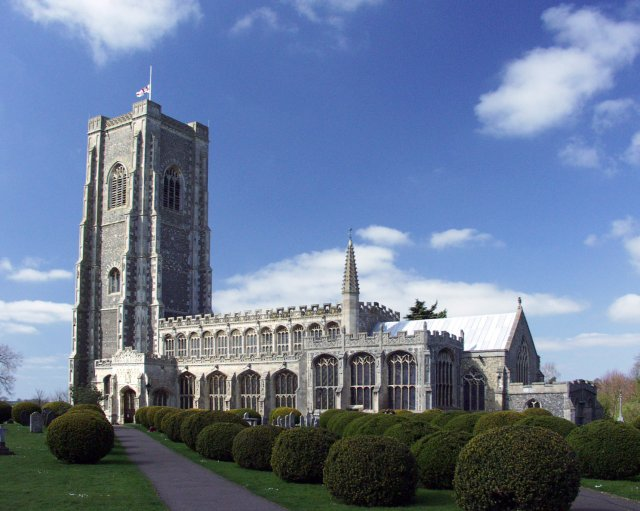
- St Peter and St Paul's Church, Lavenham
- St Peter and St Paul's Church, Lavenham
- 52°6′22.83″N 0°47′29″E
- Location: Lavenham
- Country: England
- Denomination: Church of England
- Website: lavenham.church

History
- Dedication: St Peter and St Paul

Architecture
- Heritage designation: Grade I listed
- Architect: John Wastell
- Style: Late Perpendicular
- Completed: 1525

Specifications
- Length: 156 feet (48 m)
- Height: 138 feet (42 m)

Administration
- Province: Canterbury
- Diocese: Diocese of St Edmundsbury and Ipswich
- Archdeaconry: Sudbury
- Deanery: Lavenham
- Parish: Lavenham with Preston

Clergy
- Rector: Reverend Canon Simon Pitcher

St Peter and St Paul's Church, Lavenham is a Grade I listed parish church in the Church of England in Lavenham, Suffolk. It is a notable wool church and regarded as one of the finest examples of Late Perpendicular Gothic architecture in England.

== History ==
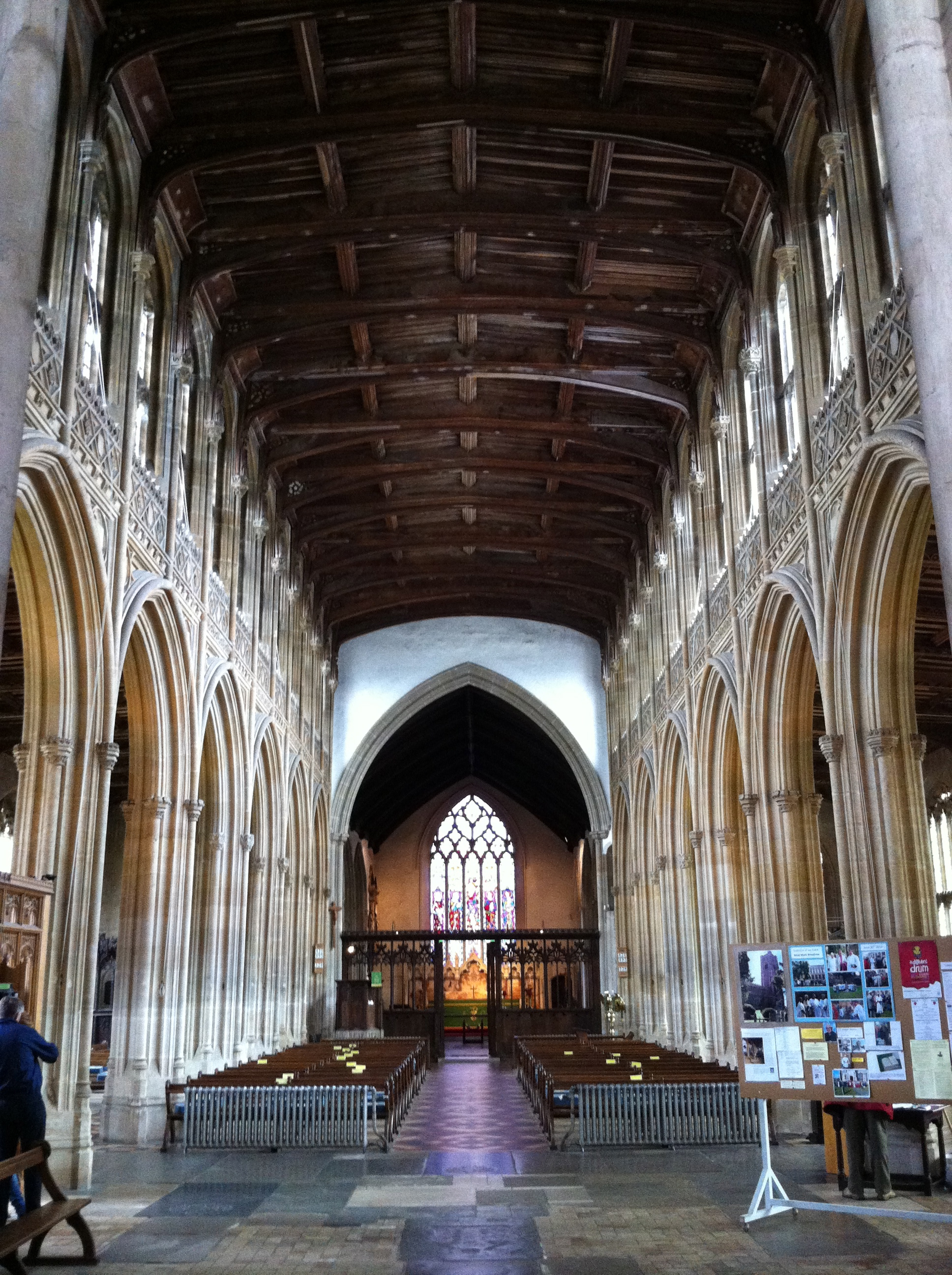
The nave

A church has existed on the current site, in a prominent position to the west of the town, since Anglo-Saxon times. The original church, which was probably wooden, was rebuilt in stone in the 14th century. The chancel is the oldest part of the current church, having been constructed in c. 1340 and decorated with money from wealthy citizens, including Thomas Spring II. In the decades following the Black Death the town of Lavenham grew rich as a result of the booming wool trade. The 14th-century church was added to and modified several times in order to convey the new wealth of its religious community. The eastern vestry, built in 1440, is the only other remaining part of the previous church building. Following the victory of Henry VII at the Battle of Bosworth Field in 1485, the Earl of Oxford, a major local landowner and commander of Henry's army, suggested that the church should be rebuilt in the latest style to celebrate the new Tudor king. However, it is likely that plans were already underway to rebuild the church in order to reflect the growing prosperity of Lavenham.

The reconstruction of the church took place mainly between 1485 and 1525. The architect is thought to have been John Wastell, who built the Church of St Mary the Great, Cambridge, which is very similar. The building is late perpendicular in its design, and regarded as one of the finest churches built in that style. It was also one of the last churches to be completed before the English Reformation. The extraordinary cost of the work was paid for by the local merchant families, who had become amongst the wealthiest in England. The same families continued to pay for the upkeep of the building, in some cases for centuries after its completion.

The two principal donors for church were the 13th Earl of Oxford and the cloth merchant, Thomas Spring of Lavenham. As such, the building is decorated with the coat-of-arms of the Spring and de Vere families. The Spring arms, as well as the merchant's mark of Thomas Spring, appears over thirty times on the exterior of the building, while the star of the de Vere family surrounds the top of the tower. A screen in the south aisle was possibly intended as a chantry chapel for the clothier Thomas Spourne, although his remains do not lie here, whilst the parclose screen in the north aisle was to the chantry of the Spring family, later ennobled by Charles I. The remains of Thomas Spring lie in the church and there are several monuments erected to his descendants, such as Francis Spring. North of the chancel is the Branch Chapel dating from around 1500 and south of the chancel is the Spring Chapel dating from around 1525.

The church was extensively restored by Francis Penrose between 1861 and 1867. The diplomat, Sir Cecil Spring Rice, gave substantial funds for repair work to the tower in the 20th century.

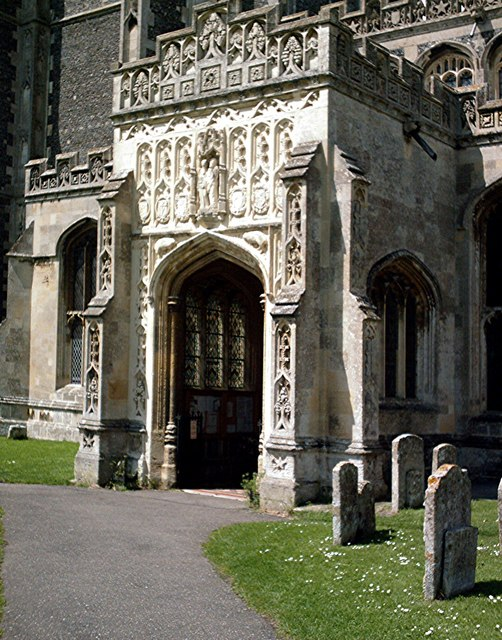
The porch and its patron saints

Today, the church is one of the most visited in East Anglia. It was awarded four stars by Simon Jenkins in his 1999 book England's Thousand Best Churches. Jenkins writes:

"Many enthusiasts prefer it to Long Melford, finding it less ostentatious, more serene. To the purist, its tower is more original, its nave more Perpendicular, and its chancel arch more majestic. Against this must be set the dire Victorian glass but for that at least there is an easy answer. ... Lavenham's interior is one of the most dramatic in Suffolk."

== Furnishings ==
The church contains five 15th-century misericords featuring imagery such as composite creatures; one, half-woman, half beast playing a viol, and another, half-man with the hindquarters and tail of a beast, mimicking her by playing a pair of bellows with a crutch. Another shows a pelican with her chicks, and another depicts a man holding a pig.

There are numerous other outstanding fittings, including a painted rood screen dating from c. 1330–1340 and an octagonal font also from the 14th century which is much worn. Parclose screens front both the Branch and Spring chapels. The wonderfully carved Spourne parclose screen protects the tomb of John Ponder (d. 1520). Funeral monuments range from the 15th to 17th centuries and include one small memorial brass to an infant, showing the child wrapped in blankets. The carved figures of St Peter and St Paul above the porch were sculpted by Eric Winters and installed in 1965.

The wrought-iron gates at the entrance to the porch were made by local blacksmith Edgar Clark Lingley (1822–1888) as were the latch and handle on the doors, which date from 1865. The porch gates were made previously.

== Tower and bells ==
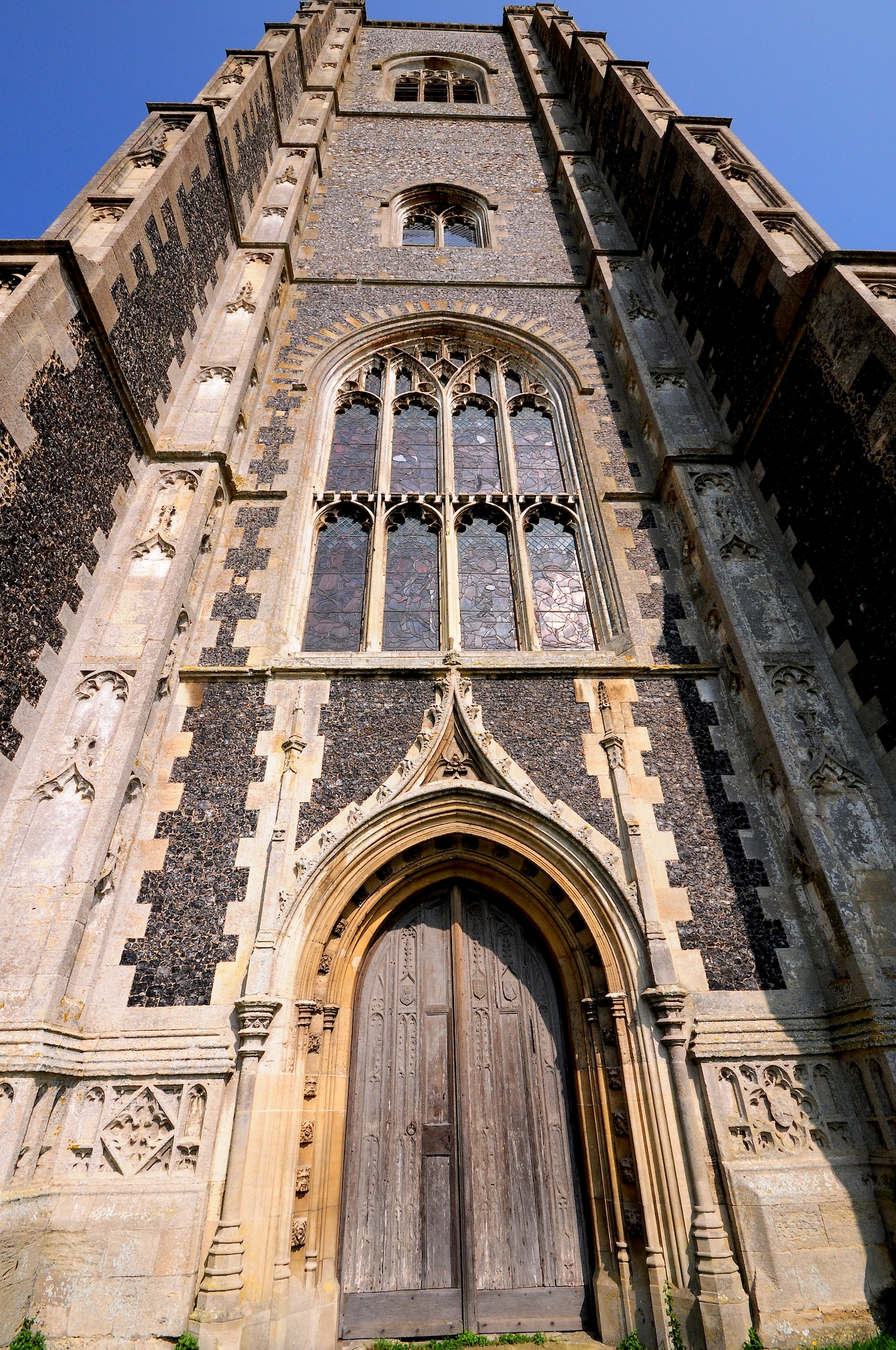
The tower from the west

Work started on the tower in 1486 and was completed in 1495. However, due to a large sum of money being left in the will of Thomas Spring, further work was undertaken in the early 16th century, resulting in the unusual size and grandeur of the tower today. It is built in four stages, of knapped flint and stone with rare clasping buttresses. The tower ring comprises eight bells. The tenor weighs 21 cwt 7 lb, and was cast by Miles Graye of Colchester in 1625. The Lavenham Deanery guidebook says the bell has been described as "the finest toned bell in England, probably in the world". The bell is rung whenever a member of the royal family dies.

The church clock, which has no external dial, was made by Thomas Watts in 1775; an hour strike and quarter chimes were installed to mark Queen Victoria's Golden Jubilee.

The tower is 138 feet (42 metres) high.

== Clergy ==
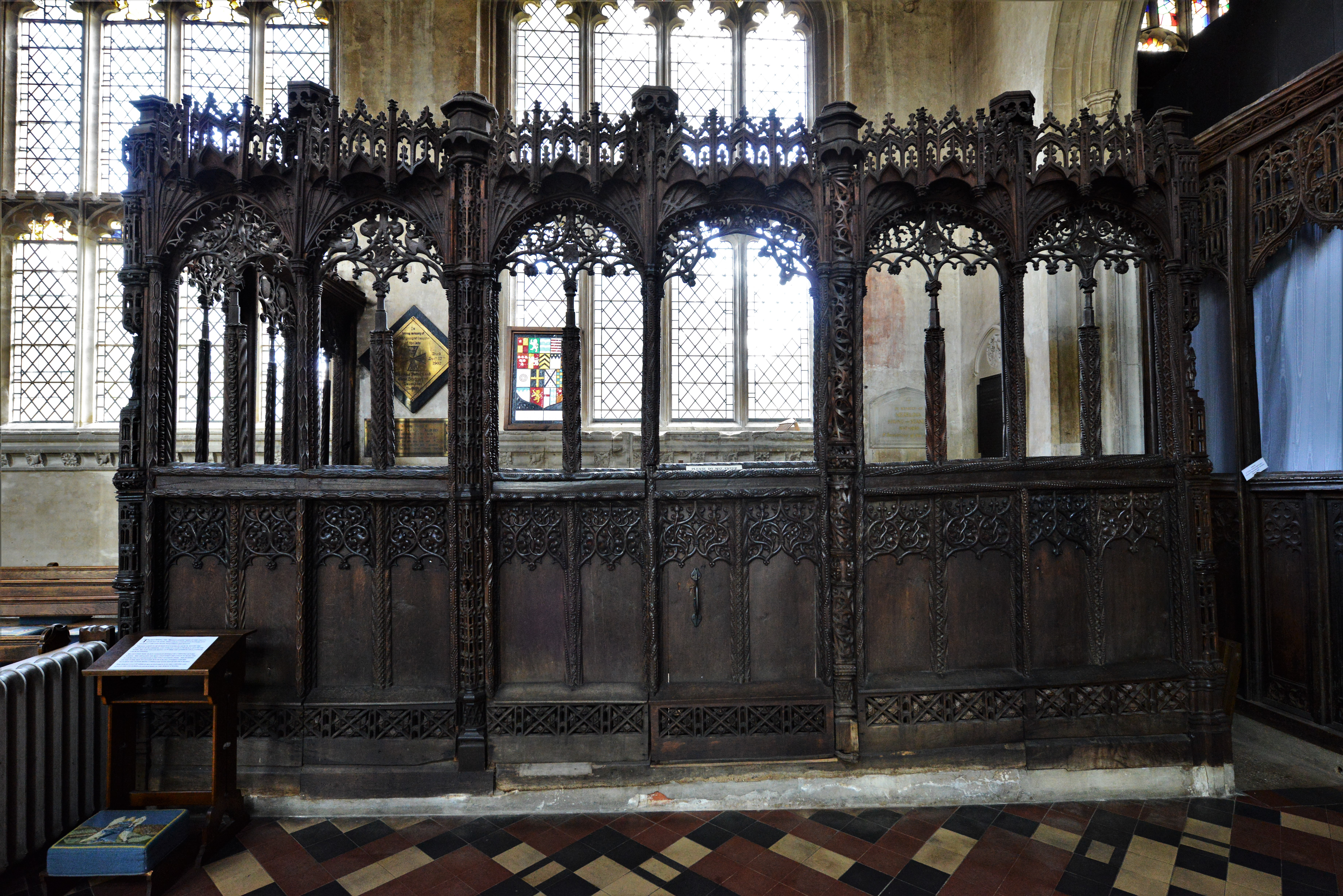
Parclose screen, as specified in the will of Thomas Spring (d. 1523)

The Puritan divine, William Gurnall, known for his 1655–62 literary work The Christian in Complete Armour, and also as one of the few Puritans who conformed to the Act of Uniformity 1662, was Rector of St Peter and St Paul from 1644 until his death in 1679.

- Godfrey de Merk 1260
- Godfried 1280
- Nicholas de Wytcherch 1302
- Robert de Elmham 1312
- Robert de Stoke 1334
- William de Lavenham 1354
- John de Pelham 1361
- John Poland 1386
- John Pygot 1400
- John Saddle 1416
- William Fallam 1444
- William Morton 1453
- George Vere 1459
- John Walter 1462
- Henry Boost 1475
- Thomas Ashby 1477
- John Gigles 1486
- Thomas Appleton 1497
- Thomas Stackhouse 1508
- William Basse 1529
- Christopher Chapman 1558
- William Day DD 1569
- William Reynolds 1571
- Henry Copinger DD 1578
- Ambrose Copinger DD 1622
- William Gurnall MA 1644
- Roger Young MA 1679
- William Turner MA 1688
- Thomas Kinnersley MA 1710
- Robert Wright MA 1729
- John Squaire MA 1730
- John Davy MA 1763
- James Buck MA 1792
- William Okes MA 1825
- Richard Johnson 1825
- Joseph Morrison Croker MA 1855
- Thomas Scott MA 1891
- Alex Tweedie MA 1907
- William Bonner Leighton Hopkins MA 1907
- George Hugh Lenox Conyngham MA 1917
- Martin Fountain Page MA 1933
- Henry Cotton MA 1952
- Rex Bird 1965
- Harry Crichton 1976
- Dennis Pearce 1986
- Derrick Malcolm Stiff 1994
- Nicholas Woodcock 2003
- Stephen Earl
- Simon Pitcher
