= Resident Evil Village =

2021 video game

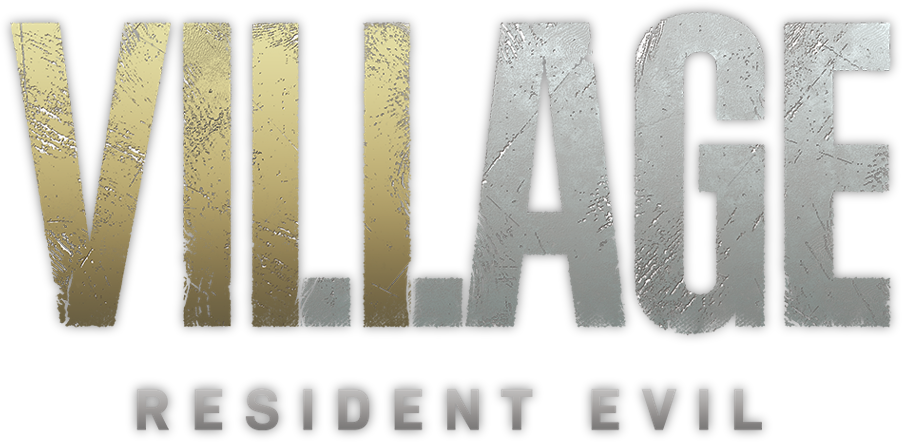
- Developer: Capcom
- Publisher: Capcom
- Director: Morimasa Sato
- Producers: Tsuyoshi Kanda; Peter Fabiano; Masachika Kawata
- Designer: Isamu Hara
- Programmers: Tetsuro Noda; Masaharu Kamo
- Artist: Tomonori Takano
- Writer: Antony Johnston
- Composers: Shusaku Uchiyama; Nao Sato; Kota Suzuki; Azusa Kato
- Series: Resident Evil
- Engine: RE Engine
- Platforms: PlayStation 4; PlayStation 5; Stadia; Windows; Xbox One; Xbox Series X/S; macOS; Nintendo Switch; iOS; iPadOS; Nintendo Switch 2
- Release: May 7, 2021: PS4, PS5, Stadia, Windows, Xbox One, Xbox Series X/S; May 7, 2021; macOS, Switch; October 28, 2022; PlayStation VR2; February 22, 2023; iOS, iPadOS; October 30, 2023; Switch 2; February 27, 2026
- Genre: Survival horror
- Mode: Single-player

Resident Evil Village (Note: Known in Japan as Biohazard Village (Japanese: バイオハザード ヴィレッジ, Hepburn: Baiohazādo Virejji) and commonly referred to as Resident Evil 8 or Resident Evil 8: Village) is a 2021 survival horror game developed and published by Capcom. It is the sequel to Resident Evil 7: Biohazard (2017). Players control Ethan Winters, who searches for his kidnapped daughter in a mysterious European village filled with mutant creatures, which also holds secrets around the Umbrella Corporation. Village maintains survival horror elements from previous games, with players scavenging environments for items and managing resources while adding more action-oriented gameplay, with higher enemy counts and a greater emphasis on combat.

Resident Evil Village was announced at the PlayStation 5 reveal event in June 2020 and was released for PlayStation 4, PlayStation 5, Stadia, Windows, Xbox One, and Xbox Series X/S on May 7, 2021. This was followed by a macOS version and a cloud version for Nintendo Switch in October 2022, a PlayStation VR2 version in February 2023, an iOS version in October 2023, and a Nintendo Switch 2 version in February 2026.

Resident Evil Village received generally positive reviews, with praise for its gameplay, setting, and variety, but criticism for its puzzles, boss fights, and performance on the Windows version. The increased focus on action divided opinions. The game won year-end accolades including Game of the Year at the Golden Joystick Awards. It had sold over 16.27 million units by October 2024. A sequel, Resident Evil Requiem, was released on February 27, 2026.

== Gameplay ==
In this gameplay screenshot, the player character is exploring Lady Dimitrescu's castle.

Like its predecessor, Resident Evil 7: Biohazard, Resident Evil Village uses a first-person perspective, and has the option for a third-person perspective. It is set in a snowy explorable European village, described as "pulled straight from the Victorian era" and much larger and more immersive than its predecessor. Structures and buildings in the central village can be climbed and used to fight enemies. Compared to Biohazard, the game is more action focused, with protagonist Ethan Winters equipped with more combat skills due to military training. The game's primary enemies, the werewolf-like Lycans, are agile and intelligent and can wield weapons and attack in packs, forcing the player to rethink their strategy on whether to use sparse ammunition, use melee combat, or run away. Similar to Resident Evil 4 (2005), makeshift barricades can be used to fend off enemies.

The inventory management mechanic is similar to that of Resident Evil 4, featuring a briefcase and the ability to move and rotate items for better storage space. Players can buy supplies, weapons, upgrades, and items from a merchant called the Duke. The players can hunt animals in the village and have them cooked into dishes by the Duke. Eating side dishes allows the player to gain certain advantages such as decreasing the damage taken while blocking. Treasures and collectibles can be found around the village, and sold to the Duke for currency.

Players can manually save the game progress by locating and using typewriters, which replaces the tape recorders in Resident Evil 7 and marks their first appearance in a mainline game since Resident Evil 4. A map of the village can be accessed from the pause menu, as well as a diary with sketches recapping the player's progress in the story so far. Two features added to the game were photo mode, which allow to screenshot in-game moments, and a button to skip cutscenes.

The Mercenaries Mode, an arcade-style game mode of past Resident Evil games, returns in Village. In this mode, players fight through timed stages, and purchase items and upgrades from the Duke's Emporium. Players who purchased Village also received Resident Evil Re:Verse, a six-player online multiplayer third-person shooter. After nearly a year and half delay, Re:Verse was activated in October 2022. IGN criticized the balancing of the game, lack of content, and aggressive monetization, while GamingBolt stated that Re:Verse is the worst Resident Evil game. Re:Verse was shut down on June 29, 2025.

== Synopsis ==
=== Setting and characters ===
Resident Evil Village is set four years after the events of Resident Evil 7, largely on February 9, 2021. Ethan Winters returns as the protagonist, having defeated bioweapon Eveline in Resident Evil 7. Since then, Ethan has been living with his wife Mia and six-month-old daughter Rose in an unnamed mountainous region of Eastern Europe. On the night of February 8, 2021, Chris Redfield—the protagonist of many previous Resident Evil entries—and his men suddenly appear at the Winterses' home, murder Mia in cold blood, and kidnap Ethan and Rose. While they are being transported in a van, a mysterious entity crashes it just outside the titular village, and separates the two. Ethan begins to search the village to rescue Rose, but finds that it is swarmed by werewolf-like mutants called Lycans. He comes to discover that the village is governed by four mutant lords, each controlling their own forces from within strongholds scattered throughout. The first, Lady Dimitrescu, is a tall aristocrat vampire, and resides at Castle Dimitrescu with her three daughters Bela, Cassandra, and Daniela, as well as their mutated female attendants. The second, the hallucination-inducing and ghostly Donna Beneviento, rules from her mansion, House Beneviento, and acts through her puppet Angie. The third, Salvatore Moreau, is a grotesque "merman" who operates from a reservoir near the village. The last, Karl Heisenberg, is a man of average stature who can manipulate electromagnetic fields, and leads an army of cybernetic mutant humanoids (known as Soldats) from a contemporary factory. All four houses respond to a supreme leader figure called Mother Miranda, the witch-like ruler of the village who is a "presence worshipped by the villagers."

=== Plot ===
Three years after the events of Resident Evil 7, Ethan and his wife Mia have been relocated to Europe by Chris Redfield to start a new life with their newborn daughter Rose. One night, Chris and his Hound Wolf Squad raid the house, assassinate Mia, and abduct Ethan and Rose. The next morning, an unconscious Ethan awakens beside the crashed transport truck and discovers that Rose is missing. Making his way through a dark forest, he finds a mysterious village being terrorized by werewolf-like creatures called Lycans. Ethan finds surviving villagers holed-up in a house but fails to save them during an attack and is captured by Karl Heisenberg and brought before the village priestess Mother Miranda and her lords: Alcina Dimitrescu, Donna Beneviento, Salvatore Moreau and Heisenberg himself. Ethan evades a death trap set by Heisenberg and ventures into Dimitrescu's castle in hopes of finding Rose, with help from a mysterious merchant known as the Duke. Ethan eliminates Dimitrescu and her daughters, finding a flask containing Rose's head. The Duke explains that Miranda placed Rose's body parts in four different flasks for a special ritual, and that she can be restored if Ethan recovers the other flasks, held by the remaining lords.

While killing Beneviento and Moreau for their flasks, Ethan learns that the Hound Wolf Squad and Chris are also present in the village. Ethan passes a test from Heisenberg for the fourth flask and is invited to the lord's factory, where Heisenberg proposes they defeat Miranda together, revealing that Miranda was deliberately killing the lords through Ethan. Ethan refuses once he learns Heisenberg intends to weaponize Rose, and escapes. Venturing through the factory, Ethan encounters and confronts Chris over Mia's death, and Chris reveals that "Mia" was actually Miranda in disguise. Chris reveals that Miranda possesses the power of mimicry and was attempting to abduct Rose, succeeding when she crashed the transport truck. Chris destroys Heisenberg's factory while Ethan uses a makeshift armored tank to kill a mutated Heisenberg. After the battle, Miranda reveals herself and mocks Ethan, revealing her plans to take Rose as her own. She then rips his heart out, killing him.

Witnessing Ethan's death, Chris leads his Hound Wolf Unit to extract Rose while a Bioterrorism Security Assessment Alliance (BSAA) assault force distracts Miranda. Chris enters a cave beneath the village and discovers the Megamycete, (Note: Called the "fungal root" (菌根, kin kon) and the "Black God" (黒き神, kuroki kami) in the Japanese game) the source of the mold. He plants a bomb on the Megamycete lair and finds Miranda's lab, learning that she has lived a century since coming into contact with the fungus, and was a mentor to the Umbrella Corporation's founder Ozwell E. Spencer; Ozwell used her knowledge to develop the T-Virus. Miranda experimented with the fungus in an attempt to revive her deceased daughter, Eva, who had succumbed to the Spanish flu a century ago; the four lords, Lycans, and Eveline were all failed experiments. Rose, however, is a suitable host, due to her special abilities inherited from Ethan and Mia. Chris rescues the imprisoned Mia, who reveals that Ethan should still be alive, due to his "special" nature.

Ethan revives after encountering Eveline in limbo, who reveals that he had died in his first encounter with Jack Baker in Dulvey three years ago but was revived by her mold, which gave him regenerative powers. The Duke brings Ethan to the ritual site where Miranda attempts to revive Eva, but ends up reviving Rose instead. Enraged, she battles Ethan, who kills her, before the Megamycete emerges from the ground. Ethan, with his regenerative powers finally having reached their limit, sacrifices himself to detonate the bomb planted on the Megamycete, while Chris transports Mia and Rose to safety. As Mia mourns Ethan's death, Chris learns that the BSAA soldiers sent to investigate the village were organic bioweapons and orders his squad to head for the BSAA's European headquarters to find those responsible.

==== Shadows of Rose ====
Rose, now sixteen years old, has been separated from Mia while under Chris's protection. She has become a social outcast due to her abilities gained from the Megamycete, and resents her powers. Canine, a member of the Hound Wolf Squad, informs her that, according to Miranda's research, there is a Purifying Crystal within the realm of the Megamycete that can remove Rose's abilities. He proposes that Rose finds the rest of Miranda's research within the sea of consciousnesses stored within the Megamycete fragment that the team has salvaged. Rose uses her powers for her consciousness to enter the Megamycete, where she discovers herself in a realm similar to Dimitrescu's castle. She finds it covered in spewing mold, with monsters led by a masked version of the Duke hunting and killing clones of herself. She encounters a guiding spirit whom she names Michael. Despite Michael's advice to leave the Megamycete, Rose persists, wanting to rid herself of her powers. With Michael's help, Rose escapes the castle but falls into a deeper stratum within the Megamycete.

Rose finds herself in a replica of Beneviento's house, where she relives her traumatic childhood of constant bullying by her schoolmates, and the realm's leader tells her it is her father's fault she received her undesired powers. To comfort Rose, Michael shows her a realm similar to her house as a baby, where she finds a letter for her written by her father, saying that he loves her and will always be by her side. She is immediately pulled out of the realm and brought back to the previous one by the realm's perpetrator who reveals herself to be Eveline, seeking to kill Rose out of jealousy over being a failed and unloved experiment. Michael once again helps Rose escape.

Rose finds herself in yet another deeper stratum that resembles the village where she was kidnapped. There, she discovers and uses the Purifying Crystal, which absorbs her powers. Miranda's consciousness appears, who reveals that the man "Canine" Rose spoke with was an illusion to lure her into the Megamycete. Still determined to revive her daughter Eva, Miranda intends to use Rose's consciousness as a vessel now that she is powerless. Michael immediately manifests, revealing himself to be Ethan's consciousness within the Megamycete, and helps Rose escape, but Miranda catches up to them. Ethan encourages Rose to leave and battles Miranda himself. Seeing her father in danger, Rose is reluctant to leave, but when she hears his cries, she breaks the crystal and regains her powers before defeating Miranda. She embraces her father, who apologizes for not being there during her upbringing, but says that he is proud of her. Rose's consciousness then leaves the Megamycete. Rose later visits Ethan's grave before being called away on a mission for the BSAA. As she and her escort drive off into the distance, an unknown figure approaches the vehicle.

== Development ==
Resident Evil Village was in development for approximately three and a half years before its announcement in June 2020. Capcom asked the Resident Evil team to start development on August 8, 2016, while Resident Evil 7 was still about a half a year from release, according to director Morimasa Sato. Without having RE7's release to judge its success, the team kept the initial designs around the core survival horror gameplay roots that had been in Resident Evil 4 (RE4) and had been a return to form in RE7. During this early period they came up with the concept of the village as the central theme, inspired by RE4, where its village was also a central location as well as many of the gameplay mechanics established by the title. The team used RE4's approach to create "a balance of combat, exploration, and puzzle solving". Sato said that for the new game, "we're bringing the essence of Resident Evil 4, while Resident Evil 7 functions as the base for the game". Looking back at the use of horror of RE7, producer Tsuyoshi Kanda said, "One of the lessons we took away is that this isn't something that is black and white, it's always going to have some variation or modification, and figuring out, OK, this worked for [RE7], but rather than replicating it, let's find a variation that works for a wider audience." The development team opted for a more balanced take on action and horror for Village.

RE7 was released in January 2017 and was well received by critics and players, so the team decided to make the next game a direct sequel to RE7, keeping its protagonist Ethan Winters as the main character and retaining the same style of gameplay. According to Kanda, this also helped to complete Ethan's story that was left open in RE7. The team had become attached to his character, and worked to devise a story for him with the other Resident Evil teams within Capcom.

=== Art design ===
As they continued to develop the village, Sato said they wanted to give players more freedom toward solving problems, and make it "a horror movie that you can play". Kanda said that like with RE4, they were able to incorporate a variety of different themes of horror within the village, leading Capcom to describe the village as "a theme park of horror". In contrast to past Resident Evil games that generally have been linear progressions, the team created a more open world-style village, with optional and secret areas, designed to reward the player for exploration. The main story remained in a pre-set order that the team felt best for how the player should experience it. He said that compared to the claustrophobic feeling of the Baker mansion in RE7, the horror in the game came from the uncertainty on what lurks in the "openness" of the village, while easing the "tension curve" compared to the previous game through quiet moments such as save points. Sato also stated that the village's snowy weather was inspired by the team's trip to Europe for research for the game, where they were met by an "unseasonable cold snap, the scenery was covered in snow. This inspired us to implement snowscapes into our game. We use snow not just for visual presentation, but as gameplay elements as well." While it is recognized by Capcom as the eighth main game in the series, and its logo is stylized to include the Roman numeral "VIII" for 8, the producers stylized the title to emphasize the "village" aspect rather than the "8". In a Famitsu interview, producers Kanda and Peter Fabiano said that they considered the village a character, and wanted to reflect that in the stylization of the title so that players would remember it. Development on the game was hampered by the COVID-19 pandemic in Japan, at one point bringing the development process to a halt for a month.

"You'll find that many of the enemies that appear in Resident Evil Village are inspired by many figures you might find in classic or gothic horror. However, in order for them to make sense in the Resident Evil universe, it was imperative that the daughters be "living beings". No matter how supernatural something may appear, there's always some kind of scientific explanation as to why things are happening. This approach isn't just specific to Resident Evil Village, but the franchise as a whole, and was something we were sure to address. When we were constructing the narrative and the full scope of the game, it was an aspect that we were very conscious of."

— Morimasa Sato, Resident Evil Village: Meet Lady Dimitrescu's three daughters.

According to art director Tomonori Takano, the developmental team drew inspiration from Resident Evil 4 as they wanted memorable characters to populate the village. Takano said the developers wanted to continue the same approach that started with Resident Evil 7 in that they wanted to move away from simply using elements like zombies to scare players but created unique situations and characters that would create fear in new ways. Capcom had considered populating the game's castle and village with hundreds of witches but found this difficult to conceptualize. The team decided to switch directions from witches to vampires for Lady Dimitrescu and her daughters, albeit avoiding stereotypical tropes of vampires in popular culture. Castle Dimitrescu was also inspired by Peleș Castle in Romania.

The other three Houses in the villages drew from other classic gothic horror themes of simulacra, mermen, and ghosts for Heisenberg, Moreau, and Beneviento, respectively. Karl Heisenberg is characterized as an engineer with an extravagant dress sense inspired by men's fashion from the 1960s; his base of operations is not covered in snow unlike the other lords', likely due to the lower altitude of its location. Salvatore Moreau was conceived as "the most repulsive character on Earth"; his domain was originally inspired by a frozen lake the team sighted during a research trip in Eastern Europe. House Beneviento furthered some of the ideas that the team had used in Resident Evil 7, with Sato noting that the fully veiled Donna Beneviento and her puppet Angie are considered to be the scariest of the four lords by his American colleagues, even though the team approached Angie's design with an instant impact in mind rather than being purely frightening. For major antagonist Mother Miranda, Takano stated that crows were the primary motif of her design, noting them being symbolic in the game's village, as well as functioning as an overarching design theme for the game.

The Lycans' werewolf-like design was developed with the game's gothic horror setting in mind, with Sato explaining, "[They] very much spawned from the fact that we wanted to create an enemy that represented the village...We designed it very much where this is kind of the twisted outcome of a human being where we draw a lot of inspiration from werewolves, being able to tap into that gothic horror visual."

Chris Redfield, a prominent protagonist in several Resident Evil entries since the first game, appears as a major supporting character in Village; however, he is instead shown as more nefarious in the game's trailers due to killing Mia and kidnapping Rose, which surprised longtime fans. Kanda described Chris's appearance in the game as "a much darker, more sinister role," in contrast to his previous heroic portrayal in the series. Chris's actions serve as a major mystery to the game, which Capcom felt was an opportunity to showcase the character's progression to fans who were already familiar with him. Chris eventually becomes playable towards the end of Village, where the game briefly transitions from survival horror gameplay into a more action-heavy segment due to Chris's veteran experience in fighting bioweapons, which Andy Kelly of PC Gamer saw as a "cathartic moment for players who have been carefully conserving ammunition up until that point."

Similar to Resident Evil 3 (2020), Resident Evil Village included a six-player online multiplayer third-person shooter game titled Resident Evil Re:Verse, developed by NeoBards Entertainment. Originally meant to launch on the same day as the main game, the game was delayed until summer 2021, and was delayed again before releasing on October 28, 2022, for PlayStation 4, Windows, and Xbox One.

=== Technology ===
==== Graphics ====
Resident Evil Village was developed using Capcom's own RE Engine as a cross-generation title including Xbox One and PlayStation 4 along with the new Xbox Series X/S and PlayStation 5 consoles that released six months earlier. Initially, Capcom did not want to commit to a release on Xbox One and PlayStation 4 following the game's announcement in June 2020 until they could ensure they could make the game run at a sufficient quality on those consoles. Producer Tsuyoshi Kanda said that they "developed Village as a game for next-gen hardware" and had to undergo "a lot of trial and error to somehow provide a comparable experience on last-gen hardware". The Xbox One and PlayStation 4 versions were announced in January 2021. On PC, PlayStation 5 and Xbox Series X/S, Village includes optional ray tracing effects while older eighth generation consoles rely on traditional forms of rasterization such as screen-space. Ray traced global illumination (RTGI) is used for indirect lighting. RTGI contributes warmer single bounce lighting in indoor scenes and enables softer shadows with correct falloff properties. When RTGI is enabled, it also replaces screen-space ambient occlusion with ray traced ambient occlusion. The game supports ray traced reflections, allowing materials such as polished floors to accurately reflect their surroundings. However, these reflections are rendered at as low as one eighth of the primary resolution.

Volumetric fog and volumetric lighting are used in outdoor scenes to create atmosphere. Ambient animation gently moves trees in the breeze. Post-processing effects in Village have been toned down compared to the heavy film grain and light bleed used to evoke found-footage films in Resident Evil 7: Biohazard. Resident Evil Village instead provides cleaner image with greater clarity.

Resident Evil Village integrates hardware-based Tier 2 variable rate shading. Variable rate shading is a DirectX 12 Ultimate feature where shading performance is improved by varying the shading rate across different pixel groups within a frame according to its level of visual importance such as motion. It is supported on Xbox Series X/S, Nvidia GeForce RTX 20 series GPUs and AMD Radeon RX 6000 series GPUs. Tier 2 variable rate shading offers higher granularity in specifying different shading rates for pixel groups within a single draw call.

As an AMD-sponsored title, Capcom included AMD graphics features in Village. They integrated AMD's FidelityFX Single Pass Downsampler (SPD) for accelerating texture mapping and post-processing using asynchronous compute. FidelityFX Contrast Adaptive Sharpening (CAS) selectively increases the sharpness of pixels in certain areas of a frame, intended to reduce TAA blur. An alternative to the RE Engine's default screen-space ambient occlusion included is AMD's FidelityFX CACAO, an adaptive compute-based form of ambient occlusion that is higher quality than the screen-space solution. AMD's FidelityFX Super Resolution upscaling solution was added in a July 2021 update.

On Xbox Series X/S and PlayStation 5, the game runs at 45 frames per second when ray tracing is enabled and 60 frames per second when disabled. On PlayStation 5, loading screens have been entirely eliminated with just a short dip to black due to the console's solid-state drive offering over 5 GB/s sequential read speeds. The less capable solid state drive in Xbox Series X/S does not entirely eliminate loading screens, though they are reduced from eighth generation consoles. A high frame-rate mode was added for PlayStation 5 Pro was added targeting 120 frames per second if ray tracing is disabled. This mode was temporarily removed in the February 2, 2026 update 1.320 before being restored in update 1.231.

Resident Evil Village was ported to macOS with Apple silicon in 2022. The ray tracing effects featured in the Xbox Series X/S, PlayStation 5 and PC versions are missing. The 2023 port to iOS also forgoes ray tracing in spite of the iPhone 15 Pro's A17 Pro SoC featuring hardware acceleration for ray tracing. Village was one of the first titles to integrate Apple's own MetalFX upscaling solution. MetalFX uses temporal upscaling in quality mode and spatial upscaling in performance mode. MetalFX is able to keep disocclusion artifacting minimal but struggles with aliasing and image stability. The port also suffered from shader compilation issues. In their Metal API, Apple allows shader precompilation to be done when building game projects which was not done with Village. The Gold Edition of Village was ported to Nintendo Switch 2 on February 27, 2026, after being available on the Switch via cloud gaming.

== Release and promotion ==
Lady Dimitrescu, a character who rose in popularity prior to the game's release, was featured extensively in promotional material and merchandise prior to the game's launch. To promote the game, Capcom announced that a special lottery event would be held to give away a free Resident Evil Village acrylic jigsaw puzzle which could be entered by tweeting the hashtag #VILLAGE予約. On March 3, AMD announced that the PC version would feature ray tracing and AMD FidelityFX. Resident Evil Village was the featured cover game in the April 2021 issue of Game Informer. On April 30, 2021, a puppet show featuring the four lords was released on YouTube, with each puppet claiming that they are not scary. On May 11, 2021, Capcom released a video that showed a behind-the-scenes on their YouTube channel on working on the game's theme song, "Village of Shadows".

Maiden, the first of two demos, was released exclusively for the PlayStation 5 on January 21, 2021. For PS4 and PS5 users, an early access demo Village was released on April 15, 2021. It allowed players 30 minutes to explore the village and was playable only once and live for eight hours. The Castle demo was released for PlayStation early access users on April 24, 2021. It allowed players to explore the castle for 30 minutes, it was also playable once and live for 8 hours. A multi-platform demo released on May 1, 2021, for all platforms. It allowed players to explore both the Village and Castle for 60 minutes and it was live for a seven-day period.

Village was released for PlayStation 4, PlayStation 5, Stadia, Windows, Xbox One, and Xbox Series X/S on May 7, 2021. In celebration of the release, Capcom commissioned a large chalk artwork of a Lycan creature to be drawn on a hillside at Somerset. The artwork was 58 meters high and over 100 meters long. In Japan, the game was released in two versions to comply with local regulations, a CERO Z version that is legally restricted to ages 18 and up, and a CERO D version with less violence that is available to ages 17 and up with no legal restrictions. Both versions contain less violence than the international releases. A collector's edition was made available for the console versions, featuring extras such as a Chris Redfield figurine, a hardcover art book, and a village map poster. A macOS version and a cloud version for Nintendo Switch were both released on October 28, 2022. A virtual reality mode for the PlayStation 5 version was released alongside the PlayStation VR2 headset on February 22, 2023 as free DLC. A version of the game for select iPad and iPhone models was released on October 30, 2023. A Nintendo Switch 2 version was released on February 27, 2026, alongside Resident Evil 7 and Resident Evil Requiem.

=== Downloadable content ===
At E3 2021, Capcom announced that downloadable content for the game was in development. At the Capcom Showcase in June 2022, the Winters' Expansion was revealed. It includes a new story expansion titled Shadows of Rose, featuring Rosemary "Rose" Winters as the playable protagonist, alongside a third-person camera mode for the main story, and two new stages and Chris Redfield, Lady Dimitrescu, and Karl Heisenberg as additional playable characters for the Mercenaries mode. The expansion released for the PlayStation 4, PlayStation 5, Windows, Xbox One, and Xbox Series X/S versions on October 28, 2022, for the Nintendo Switch cloud version on December 2, 2022, and for the macOS version on January 13, 2023.

== Reception ==
Reception

Aggregate scores
| Aggregator | Score |
|---|---|
| Metacritic | PC: 83/100; PS4: 81/100; PS5: 84/100; XSXS: 83/100 |
| OpenCritic | 92% recommend |

Review scores
| Publication | Score |
|---|---|
| Destructoid | 9/10 |
| Electronic Gaming Monthly | 4/5 |
| GameSpot | 9/10 |
| GamesRadar+ | 3.5/5 |
| IGN | 8/10 |
| Jeuxvideo.com | 16/20 |
| PC Gamer (US) | 85/100 |
| Push Square | 9/10 |

=== Critical reception ===
Resident Evil Village received "generally favorable" reviews from critics, according to review aggregator website Metacritic.

Some critics noted the more action-centered gameplay in comparison to Resident Evil 7, and compared the switch in direction to that of Resident Evil 4. Phil Hornshaw of GameSpot wrote that while he felt Resident Evil 7 leaned towards the "dark and creepy haunted house" setting akin to Resident Evil, Village took cues from the "faster, panickier" Resident Evil 4. IGN's Tristan Ogilvie saw the game as successfully taking the best elements of the action from Resident Evil 4 and combining it with the modern design from Resident Evil 7. Hornshaw praised the new direction, feeling its notable departure from Resident Evil 7 made it work as a sequel and opined that the game provided an excellent balance of action and scares. Conversely, Leon Hurley of GameRadar was critical of the new approach, lamenting that the title was "one of the 'not a horror game' Resident Evils" and concluded that whilst the game was fun, it had undone the redefining work of Resident Evil 7. Later sections of the game received mixed opinions for their emphasis on action. Ogilvie praised the final chapters for their "chaotic levels of carnage" that reminded him of a run-and-gun Call of Duty campaign, whereas both Hornshaw and Hurley criticised the sections for being too action-heavy, negatively comparing them to Call of Duty and "the worst action-heavy portions" of Resident Evil 6.

Critics praised the variety of gameplay throughout the game's sections. Hornshaw commended the diversity of horror ideas and was impressed by how the game switched between them, calling each area "fun, intense, and, naturally, frightening in its own way." Hurley lauded the sections in the game's first half as "full of atmosphere and intrigue", particularly one for being "one of the best horror moments I've played in a long time", but thought that the game's latter half felt average. Despite this, he opined that the shifting of ideas throughout the game created excitement for what was coming next. Ogilvie noted the changes in gameplay for each section, with one catered towards stealth, while another leaned towards psychological horror over combat. He praised the increased variety of enemies compared to Resident Evil 7, saying that it added "depth and decision making" to crafting. The more open-world style of exploration was well received by critics. Hurley wrote that Resident Evil Village was the first time the series had experimented with open-world, and that a lot of his time was spent exploring areas with new skills and discovering surprises. Ogilvie concurred, writing that the focus on exploration distinguished it from previous installments, and felt rewarding and motivating from new discoveries and the inclusion of a merchant character.

The game's boss fights and puzzles drew criticism. Hurley thought that the quality of the puzzles was "consistently low", particularly criticizing an example in which a map is given to find a locked door that the player passes previously in the game, and another that had the solution next to it. Ogilvie similarly criticised the puzzles, saying that the solutions were either "exceedingly straightforward" or spoiled by instructional notes nearby. Hornshaw noted the movement system was unchanged from Resident Evil 7 and as a result felt "a little slow and clunky"; they opined it was better suited when surrounded by enemies rather than during boss battles. Hurley similarly thought that boss fights did not feel designed for first-person combat because of the slower movement, and that dodging attacks in large open spaces meant the player was often forced to move the boss out of their field of view. Ogilvie found that many of the battles fell "surprisingly short" and amounted to little more than dodging and shooting an enemy's weak points, noting that he would have preferred them to be more engaging and "epic-sized". Hornshaw wrote that the game's narrative was not one of the better Resident Evil stories, and was disappointed it did not resolve all of the plot threads from Resident Evil 7 or sufficiently tie the games into the series at large. Hurley opined that the pacing of the story was "inconsistent", and that due to how much time the player spent exploring, key story sections could either feel "weirdly short, or artificially extended." On the other hand, Ogilvie praised the story as "a compelling mystery" that engaged him throughout his entire playthrough."

The arcade mode "The Mercenaries", which is unlocked on completion of the main game, was praised by Hornshaw for "demonstrat[ing] how tight the combat in Village can be" and for being fun in its own right. Ogilvie also praised the mode as "addictive" and "the most valuable bonus to unlock".

=== Windows performance ===
The Windows version of the game had performance problems, particularly during intense combat. Richard Leadbetter of Digital Foundry noted the "tremendously high frame times" and "extraordinary" stuttering, especially during encounters with the maidens and other enemies with certain animations. Leadbetter attributed this to a combination of Denuvo along with Capcom's own anti-tamper software. In July 2021, a pirated version of the game by an independent cracker was released, effectively stripping away the Denuvo and Capcom digital rights management (DRM) software. Leadbetter tested this version against the original release and was able to confirm that the crack improved upon the game's performance, stating that "By stripping out what the hackers call Capcom's entry points for the DRM... the game is absolutely transformed in those areas." A similar problem where Capcom had added additional DRM atop Denuvo had affected Devil May Cry 5 for Windows, and after Capcom's official update that removed Denuvo and its DRM, Devil May Cry 5's performance was improved. Capcom released a patch for Village later that July that, among other changes, altered how the game used Denuvo. Leadbetter found that the patch improved performance, running equivalent to the pirated version.

=== Alleged plagiarism ===
Shortly after release, film director Richard Raaphorst accused Capcom of plagiarism, citing close similarities between a monster that was featured in his film Frankenstein's Army and the "Sturm" creature in Resident Evil Village.

=== Sales ===
Resident Evil Village shipped over three million units in its first four days of release, becoming the third-fastest-selling title in the Resident Evil series, tied with 2019's Resident Evil 2. At the same time, Capcom announced the series had sold a total of 100 million units since its debut in 1996. From May 3 to May 9, 2021, Famitsu rated the PlayStation 4 version at first place in the Japanese gaming charts, selling 111,171 units in a week. The PlayStation 5 version sold 38,713 units, reaching fourth place in the charts. Resident Evil Village was also the best-selling game across the United States and the United Kingdom during the month of May 2021. It went on to become the eighth best-selling game of 2021 in the US. The game sold 6.1 million units worldwide by May 2022, and reached 6.4 million units by June 2022. By January 2023, it had sold 7.4 million units. By June 2023, it had sold 8.3 million units. At the end of 2023, it had sold 9.3 million units. By November 2024, it had sold over 10.5 million units. By April 2025, it had sold over 11 million units. By January 2026, it had sold 13.589 million copies. By May 2026, it had sold 14.93 million copies.By October 2026, it has sold 16.27 million copies.

=== Accolades ===
| Year | Award | Category | Result | Ref. |
|---|---|---|---|---|
| 2021 | Golden Joystick Awards 2021 | Ultimate Game of the Year | Won | |
| 2021 | Golden Joystick Awards 2021 | PlayStation Game of the Year | Won | |
| 2021 | Golden Joystick Awards 2021 | Best Audio | Won | |
| 2021 | Golden Joystick Awards 2021 | Best Performance (Maggie Robertson) | Won | |
| 2021 | The Game Awards 2021 | Game of the Year | Nominated | |
| 2021 | The Game Awards 2021 | Best Action/Adventure Game | Nominated | |
| 2021 | The Game Awards 2021 | Best Audio Design | Nominated | |
| 2021 | The Game Awards 2021 | Best Performance (Maggie Robertson) | Won | |
| 2021 | The Game Awards 2021 | Players' Voice | Nominated | |
| 2021 | Steam Awards 2021 | Game of the Year | Won | |
| 2021 | Steam Awards 2021 | Outstanding Story-Rich Game | Nominated | |
| 2022 | 11th New York Game Awards | Great White Way Award for Best Acting in a Game (Maggie Robertson) | Won | |
| 2022 | 25th Annual D.I.C.E. Awards | Adventure Game of the Year | Nominated | |
| 2022 | 25th Annual D.I.C.E. Awards | Outstanding Achievement in Animation | Nominated | |
| 2022 | 25th Annual D.I.C.E. Awards | Outstanding Achievement in Art Direction | Nominated | |
| 2022 | 25th Annual D.I.C.E. Awards | Outstanding Achievement in Character (Lady Dimitrescu) | Won | |
| 2022 | 22nd Game Developers Choice Awards | Game of the Year | Nominated | |
| 2022 | 2022 SXSW Gaming Awards | Video Game of the Year | Nominated | |
| 2022 | 2022 SXSW Gaming Awards | Excellence in Audio Design | Won | |
| 2022 | 18th British Academy Games Awards | Artistic Achievement | Nominated | |
| 2022 | 18th British Academy Games Awards | Technical Achievement | Nominated | |
| 2022 | 18th British Academy Games Awards | Performer in a Supporting Role (Maggie Robertson) | Nominated | |
| 2022 | Japan Game Awards | Award for Excellence | Won | |
| 2023 | Apple Design Awards | Visuals and Graphics | Won | |
| 2023 | The Game Awards 2023 | Best VR / AR Game | Won | |
