= Resident Evil 7: Biohazard =

2017 video game

- Developer: Capcom
- Publisher: Capcom
- Director: Koshi Nakanishi
- Producers: Masachika Kawata; Tsuyoshi Kanda
- Designers: Hajime Horiuchi; Keisuke Yamakawa
- Programmers: Yosuke Noro; Tomofumi Ishida
- Artists: Tomonori Takano; Toshihiko Tsuda; Hiroyuki Chi
- Writer: Richard Pearsey
- Composers: Akiyuki Morimoto; Miwako Chinone; Satoshi Hori; Cris Velasco; Brian D'Oliveira
- Series: Resident Evil
- Engine: RE Engine
- Platforms: PlayStation 4; Windows; Xbox One; Nintendo Switch; PlayStation 5; Xbox Series X/S; iOS; iPadOS; macOS; Nintendo Switch 2
- Release: PS4, Windows, Xbox One: WW: January 24, 2017; JP: January 26, 2017; Nintendo Switch: JP: May 24, 2018; WW: December 16, 2022; PS5, Xbox Series X/S: WW: June 13, 2022; iOS, iPadOS, macOS: WW: July 2, 2024; Nintendo Switch 2: WW: February 27, 2026
- Genre: Survival horror
- Mode: Single-player

Resident Evil 7: Biohazard (Note: Known in Japan as Biohazard 7: Resident Evil (Japanese: バイオハザード7 レジデント イービル, Hepburn: Baiohazādo Sebun Rejidento Ībiru)) is a 2017 survival horror game developed and published by Capcom. A main installment in the Resident Evil series, it puts the player in control of Ethan Winters as he searches for his missing wife in a derelict Louisiana plantation occupied by an infected family. Resident Evil 7 diverges from the more action-oriented Resident Evil 5 and Resident Evil 6, returning to the franchise's survival horror roots, emphasizing exploration. It is the first main Resident Evil game to use a first-person view.

Resident Evil 7 is the first full-length game to use Capcom's in-house RE Engine. The development was led by Koshi Nakanishi, director of Resident Evil: Revelations. A year prior to its announcement at E3 2016, it was presented as a virtual reality demo called Kitchen. The team took inspiration from the films The Texas Chain Saw Massacre (1974), The Evil Dead (1981), and Saw (2004), scaling back the game to one location, and used a first-person perspective to immerse players. Two downloadable content scenarios were released, Not a Hero and End of Zoe.

Resident Evil 7 was released in January 2017 for PlayStation 4, Windows, Xbox One, followed by a cloud version for the Nintendo Switch in May 2018 in Japan and December 2022 worldwide. Versions for the PlayStation 5 and Xbox Series X/S released in June 2022, with iOS, iPadOS and macOS versions following in July 2024, and a Nintendo Switch 2 version releasing in February 2026. It also supports the PlayStation VR headset. The game received generally favorable reviews and was considered a return to form for the series; critics praised Capcom's new RE Engine, gameplay, puzzles, atmosphere, and virtual reality option, but the boss battles, limited enemy variety, and the slower pace of the final chapter drew some criticism. As of October 27, 2026, the game has sold 18.87 million units, making it the 2nd best-selling game in the franchise. It was nominated for several end-of-year accolades. A sequel, Resident Evil Village, was released on May 7, 2021.

== Gameplay ==
Resident Evil 7: Biohazard is a survival horror game viewed from the first-person – the second game in the series and the first main line game to use such a perspective. The player controls new protagonist Ethan Winters as he explores the Baker family's abandoned rural estate in Dulvey, Louisiana, to try and save his wife Mia. Ethan can freely rotate the camera around to view his surroundings, move in any direction, alternate between walking and sprinting to cover more ground, and interact with his surroundings to find helpful items such as weapons, ammunition, and healing items. New commands include guarding, allowing Ethan to block attacks to reduce damage, and crouching, which lets him fit through confined spaces or use stealth to evade enemies.

In this gameplay screenshot of Resident Evil 7, Ethan Winters attempts to fend off Jack Baker with a handgun.

Throughout the game, Ethan confronts various members of the Baker family, as well as humanoid fungal creatures called "Molded", that will attack and attempt to kill him on sight. While Ethan is a civilian with relatively little combat experience, he is nonetheless able to find and use various weapons from around the estate, from melee weapons like pocket knives and chainsaws, to stronger firearms such as handguns, shotguns, and a makeshift flamethrower. Ethan can shoot from the hip or aim by focusing through the scope, and move while shooting, but firearms are less powerful than those from previous action-oriented titles – enemies are tougher, can sidestep and block to avoid taking damage, and will not stay down forever, emphasizing use of stealth and fleeing encounters when necessary. Damage taken is shown by the amount of blood visible on-screen, and by a codex on Ethan's wrist shown while navigating the inventory. Items such as herbs and first aid solution can be used to heal.

Ethan has eight inventory slots (plus four slots connected to the D-pad which he can assign weapons to) but can obtain more space by finding backpacks. Safe rooms scattered throughout the game, which enemies cannot enter, provide item boxes, where Ethan can store excess items to retrieve them later, and tape recorders used to save the player's progress. Items can be examined in the inventory, which may reveal a hidden purpose or detail, discarded, or combined with others to produce key items or craft consumables like first aid solution, ammo, and psychostimulants which show the location of uncollected items for a short time. Exploration is key in the game, as puzzles scattered around the estate must be solved to open up routes, obtain key items, and advance the story, some of which may require specific items to complete. Ethan can also find VHS tapes around the estate and place them in VCRs to play through a short section as the character filming – while optional, these tapes provide insight into the story and can reveal puzzle solutions, and is similar in concept to the "Zapping System" from Resident Evil 2.

The player can also choose one of three difficulty settings: Normal (the default), Easy, and Madhouse (unlocked after beating the game). These affect the strength of enemies, abundance of items, and how often the game autosaves – Madhouse also requires Ethan to use a cassette tape in order to save at a tape recorder. Various bonus items unlocked by beating the game in a specific time limit or difficulty, for example, can also be added to the item boxes for all subsequent runs, such as infinite-ammo weapons or special items that grant buffs – e.g. glasses that provide a permanent psychostimulant effect, shoes that raise Ethan's speed, etc. The PS4 version is playable in virtual reality via PlayStation VR.

== Plot ==
In 2017, systems engineer Ethan Winters is drawn to a derelict plantation in Dulvey, Louisiana, by an email from his wife Mia, who has been missing for the past three years. Exploring a seemingly abandoned house, Ethan finds Mia imprisoned in the basement. During their escape, Mia suddenly becomes extremely violent and attacks Ethan, forcing him to kill her. After receiving a call from a woman named Zoe offering assistance, Ethan is attacked again by a revived Mia, cutting his left hand off, and then subdued by Jack Baker, patriarch of the Baker family. He is then dragged to another house where Zoe staples his hand back on. Ethan is held captive by Jack, his wife Marguerite, their son Lucas, and an elderly wheelchair-using woman. Although Ethan escapes his captors, he is repeatedly confronted by Jack, who demonstrates the ability to regenerate from fatal wounds and dismemberment.

Zoe again contacts Ethan, revealing she is the Bakers' daughter. Zoe informs Ethan that she, her family, and Mia are all infected with the same ailment, but can be cured with a special serum. Ethan makes his way to an old house to retrieve the serum ingredients, where he manages to kill Marguerite. After recovering the ingredients, Ethan experiences visions of an unknown young girl. Lucas captures Zoe and Mia before Ethan's return, and forces him to navigate a booby-trapped barn to find them. Ethan outwits Lucas, causing him to flee, and frees Zoe and Mia. Zoe then develops two serum doses, but Jack, now heavily mutated, attacks Ethan, who uses one dose to permanently kill him.

Ethan must then choose to cure either Mia or Zoe. Choosing Zoe leaves Mia heartbroken, despite Ethan's promise to send help. As he and Zoe escape on a boat, Zoe reveals that the Bakers were infected after Mia arrived with a young girl named Eveline when the wreck of a tanker ship ran aground in Dulvey. To prevent their escape, Eveline kills Zoe, and knocks Ethan from the boat. If Ethan chooses Mia, Zoe gives a bitter farewell to him and Mia. As he and Mia escape on the boat, they come across the tanker where they are attacked by Eveline and knocked from the boat.

Following either choice, Mia ends up on the wrecked ship and searches for Ethan while experiencing visions of Eveline, who refers to Mia as her mother. Eventually, Mia's memory is restored, revealing that she was a covert operative for a mysterious corporation that developed Eveline as a bioweapon. Mia and another agent, Alan Droney, were to escort Eveline as she was being transported aboard the tanker when Eveline escaped containment and grounded the ship. After killing Alan, she infected Mia in an effort to force her to be her mother. After finding Ethan, Mia gives him a vial of Eveline's genetic material. If Ethan cured Zoe, Mia succumbs to Eveline's control and attacks Ethan, forcing him to permanently kill her. If Ethan cured Mia, she resists her control long enough to seal Ethan out of the ship to save him.

After leaving the shipwreck, Ethan discovers a hidden laboratory inside an abandoned salt mine. There, he learns that Eveline is a bio-organic weapon capable of infecting people with a psychotropic mold that gives her control over her victims' minds, resulting in their insanity, superhuman regenerative abilities, and various mutations. Eveline grew up obsessed with having a family, influencing her to infect Mia and the Bakers, and lure Ethan to the Bakers' home. Lucas is also revealed to have been immunized against Eveline's control by the corporation in exchange for providing observations on her. Using the lab equipment and Eveline's genetic material, Ethan synthesizes a toxin to kill her, and proceeds through a series of tunnels that lead back to the Baker Ranch. Eveline assaults Ethan with hallucinations, but he overcomes them and injects Eveline with the toxin; she is revealed to be the elderly woman in a wheelchair, who has been rapidly aging since her escape. Eveline then mutates into a large monster but, aided by the arrival of a military squad, Ethan is able to kill her. With Eveline dead, the squad and their leader, Chris Redfield, extracts Ethan by helicopter. If Ethan did not cure Mia, he throws his phone containing her last message to him from the helicopter, saying "goodbye". If Mia was cured, she is found alive aboard Redfield's helicopter. As the helicopter flies away, it is revealed to be branded with a variation of the Umbrella Corporation logo.

=== Banned Footage ===
The first three scenarios in the Banned Footage DLC feature alternate protagonist Clancy Jarvis, who appears in some of the VHS tapes in the main game. Clancy was a cameraman who worked with "Sewer Gators", a web series where producer Andre Stickland and presenter Peter Walken explored haunted houses. In June 2017, Sewer Gators came to the estate to film the abandoned guest house, but were found and kidnapped by Jack Baker. While Andre and Peter were killed, Clancy was taken down to the processing area underneath the main house and locked inside for the night. During Nightmare, Clancy attempts to survive against Jack and hordes of Molded using weapons and traps scavenged throughout the area until dawn. Shortly afterwards, Clancy was caught and knocked out by Marguerite, awakening locked in the master bedroom in the main house, where Marguerite served Clancy her Mold-infected cooking in an effort to convert him into one of them. Bedroom shows Clancy attempting to find a way out while being checked on periodically by Marguerite, which he eventually manages to do after stabbing Marguerite in the neck with a knife to incapacitate her and unlocking a hidden tunnel underneath the bed.

However, Clancy is then caught and knocked out by Lucas, leading to the events of 21. Clancy awakens in an unknown room with his left hand strapped into a finger guillotine – opposite him, stuck in the same predicament, is an unknown man whose face is covered by a burlap sack – Lucas simply refers to him as "Hoffman". Lucas forces both men to play a modified game of blackjack, but the loser has their fingers sliced off by the guillotines. Clancy eventually wins the round after Hoffman loses all his fingers, but he refuses to give up and demands another round. Lucas then straps both men into a torture device that administers varying electrical shocks to the loser, the current going up with each loss. Clancy wins again after Hoffman's current goes so high he receives a seemingly-lethal shock, but Lucas puppeteers Hoffman's body using strings and demands a third round – he then places a makeshift buzzsaw (or a bomb in the Japanese version) that moves closer to the loser. Despite Lucas' cheating, Clancy wins – Hoffman, who turns out to be unconscious, awakens just as the buzzsaw slices his head open and kills him. However, Lucas is impressed by Clancy so much that he takes him away to play another game – the tape in the main game confirm that Clancy was killed in one of Lucas' deathtraps in the barn.

In Daughters, which takes place on October 10, 2014, three years prior to the game, a tropical cyclone causes a tanker ship, the SS Annabelle, to go missing off the coast of Louisiana. Jack carries in an unconscious girl, Eveline, found nearby. Jack places her in Lucas' room and orders Zoe to get her fresh clothes. Zoe retrieves the clothes when a lightning strike knocks out the house's power, and Eveline disappears. While Zoe searches for Marguerite, she finds an unconscious Lucas and discovers Marguerite rambling in the bathroom, before she suddenly turns violent. Jack restrains her and orders Zoe to get some rope. Returning with the rope, Zoe discovers Jack attempting to drown Marguerite, and then deliberately stabs himself before Zoe. Zoe flees, witnessing Jack dragging Lucas towards the bathroom. Downstairs, Zoe encounters an apologetic Marguerite, who claims that she had heard voices in her head. Marguerite hands Zoe the car keys and tells her to leave. If the player completed optional objectives earlier in the game, they have the option of escaping to the camper van trailer. If the player tries to escape using the car, they will be confronted by Marguerite and Jack, the latter of whom savagely beats Zoe. If the player attempts to hide in the trailer, they will discover a letter written by Mia that thanks the Bakers for their kindness and warns them about Eveline. Zoe then wakes up at the dining table with everything seemingly back to normal, but soon starts seeing visions of Eveline.

=== Not a Hero ===
Moments after extracting Ethan and Mia, BSAA agent Captain Chris Redfield teams up with the now reformed Umbrella Corporation, also known as Blue Umbrella, in order to apprehend Lucas Baker and uncover evidence on the mysterious group that created Eveline, called "The Connections". After Ethan and Mia are rescued and sent away in a helicopter during the conclusion of the main story, Chris proceeds into Lucas' lab in the salt mine, where he accidentally runs into one of Lucas' traps and has a bomb attached to his left wrist. Undeterred, Chris continues his pursuit. He tries to rescue several captured Umbrella soldiers, but they are killed by Lucas' traps. Eventually, Lucas activates a timer on Chris' bomb. Chris is forced to freeze the bomb in liquid nitrogen, disabling it long enough for him to remove it.

With the bomb removed, Chris battles his way through more of Lucas' Molded and traps. He then finds his way into a secret Connections research lab, where Lucas had killed all of the Connections researchers and plans to betray the organization. Chris manages to corner and shoot Lucas, which triggers a mutation in his body. Chris battles and eventually kills the mutated Lucas, and stops him from transferring all of his data on Eveline to an unknown party. With his mission done and Eveline's infection contained, Chris returns to the Umbrella base camp for an urgent call.

=== End of Zoe ===
Following the canon story in which Ethan cures Mia instead of Zoe, Zoe wanders into the swamp and is apparently killed by Eveline; however, a pair of Umbrella soldiers find her body and discover she is still alive. They are ambushed by Joe Baker, Zoe's uncle, who lives in the Dulvey swamps and has not been affected by Eveline's mold. Joe initially believes Umbrella is responsible for Zoe's condition, but a surviving Umbrella soldier claims they have a cure for Zoe stored in a nearby shack. Joe goes to the shack, finding a partial cure, and returns to find the Umbrella soldier killed by a Molded.

Joe initially flees with Zoe on a boat to find the Umbrella base but is soon forced to search for the base on foot. A powerful and seemingly immortal Molded called the "Swamp Man" pursues them along the way. Joe and Zoe find the Umbrella base abandoned. They learn that the cure has been moved to a nearby paddle boat. Joe boards the boat and, after encountering the Swamp Man once again, uncovers a full dose of the cure. The Swamp Man captures Zoe before Joe can administer the cure. Joe gives chase into a heavily infected portion of the swamp and finds Zoe in an abandoned church. Inside, Joe is ambushed by the Swamp Man, who is revealed to be Jack, having survived Ethan's injection. Jack knocks Joe unconscious and throws him into the swamp water to die.

Joe washes up near the Baker mansion and finds himself in the midst of a battle between the Molded and Umbrella forces. He recovers an Umbrella power gauntlet and enters the mansion, where he permanently kills Jack and administers the cure to Zoe just as Umbrella reinforcements arrive, including Chris Redfield. Chris assures Joe and Zoe that they are there to help, and Zoe is fully cured of her infection. She then receives a phone call from Ethan, and thanks him for keeping his promise to send help for her.

== Development ==
Taking inspiration from the films The Texas Chain Saw Massacre (1974), The Evil Dead (1981), and Saw (2004), the developers decided to scale back the game to one location and use a first-person perspective to immerse players and return the series to its roots of survival horror following the criticized reception of Resident Evil 6 and its action-oriented style. Development began around February 2014. According to producer Masachika Kawata, the main playable character would be "totally new" rather than a "superhero" type like Chris from Resident Evil 5 or Leon S. Kennedy from Resident Evil 6. The game is built on a custom game engine, named the RE Engine, which includes virtual reality (VR) development tools. The decision to make the game first-person was made well before VR was considered; VR development started in October 2015, for which a separate team was created. The introduction of VR demanded that textures be more detailed, discarding flat textures and inaccurate object sizes that had previously been used.

A year before the game's announcement, Capcom presented to attendants of E3 2015 a first-person horror-themed VR demo, KI7CHEN, which ran on the same engine. While Resident Evil 7 had been in development long before, KI7CHEN was seen as an opportunity to evaluate how the RE Engine and its VR capabilities would be received. As a hint to the demo's relation to Resident Evil 7, the logo of KI7CHEN had the letter "T" designed so that it resembled a "7", but it went largely unnoticed. In the company's Integrated Report of 2015, the Resident Evil development division of Capcom was stated to focus on creating experiences for the VR market, which included the new VR engine and games for the eighth generation of consoles.

The game was directed by Koshi Nakanishi, who previously helmed Resident Evil: Revelations, leading a development team numbering at about 120 staff. For the first time in the series, the narrative designer is a westerner—Richard Pearsey, writer of the two expansion packs of F.E.A.R. and one of the narrative designers of Spec Ops: The Line. At the time of the game's reveal, development was around 65% complete. Some of the creature models in Resident Evil 7 were first created in physical form—a number of them from actual meat—by make-up artists, to then be scanned through the employment of photogrammetry. This technology developed over half of the general assets of the game, but posed a problem in researching the setting of Louisiana because its considerable demand for equipment made it unviable for transport, which required Capcom to model by hand.

According to Jun Takeuchi, the high-ups at Capcom wanted Resident Evil 7: Biohazard to be a live service game with online multiplayer and microtransactions. This was putting pressure on the development team until Takeuchi was asked to join the project and scrapped those plans.

The game's score was composed by Capcom's lead composer Akiyuki Morimoto, Miwako Chinone, and Satoshi Hori, with additional contributions from Cris Velasco and Brian D'Oliveira. Its theme song, an arranged version of the traditional American folk song "Go Tell Aunt Rhody", was written by Michael A. Levine and performed by Jordan Reyne. Levine's step-daughter Mariana Barreto was the original choice, but ended up doing the background vocals. The song went through about 20 versions until completion. A soundtrack was released digitally by Sumthing Else Music Works alongside the game on January 24.

== Release and marketing ==
In October 2016, Capcom launched a 10 part video series called The World of Resident Evil 7, teasing pieces of the game's contents. A cross-save feature between Windows and the Xbox One was confirmed in November 2016. If bought on either PC through the Windows Store or on the Xbox One digitally, it is playable on both platforms through the Xbox Play Anywhere program, making it the first game published by a third-party to be a part of the program.

The internal marketing team at Capcom collaborated with creative agency iam8bit to produce an escape room called Resident Evil Escape Room Experience, in which groups of six are guided through a series of rooms by Umbrella Corporation employees. It was held at a gallery space in Echo Park, Los Angeles. In London, a similar event was hosted in concurrence with the release.

Purchase of a GameStop-exclusive Collector's Edition included an eight-inch model of the Baker mansion, which when opened functions as a music box playing the main theme rendition of "Go Tell Aunt Rhody", a mannequin finger-shaped 4 gigabyte USB flash drive contained within a VHS tape box, a SteelBook case containing the game, a lithograph of the Baker family, and a note. The UK version added the Survival Pack: Action Set DLC, a 20th anniversary artbook and a seven-inch replica of the mansion, but did not feature the music box. U.S. pre-orders on the PlayStation 4 and Xbox One came with a code for a free download of Resident Evil: Retribution. A 4D candle with the scent of the Baker House Mansion was made to enhance the virtual reality experience. The Gold Edition, released on December 12, 2017, includes previously released downloadable content (DLC) as well as the End of Zoe DLC.

Resident Evil 7: Biohazard was released for PlayStation 4, Windows, and Xbox One in North America, Europe, Australia, and New Zealand on January 24, 2017, and in Japan on January 26. For the first 12 months of its release, the virtual reality format was exclusive to PlayStation VR. Over 4,700,000 players have accumulated worldwide, over 750,000 of them being VR users. The PC version was tamper-protected by anti-piracy software Denuvo, which was hacked within five days of release. A cloud version for the Nintendo Switch, titled Biohazard 7: Resident Evil Cloud Version, was released in Japan on May 24, 2018. Players may access the first 15 minutes of the game for free, and continue playing it afterwards by purchasing a pass allowing unlimited play for 180 days. This version received a worldwide release on December 16, 2022.

Versions for PlayStation 5 and Xbox Series X/S were announced on March 2, 2022, and released digitally on June 13, 2022, alongside upgrades for Resident Evil 2 (2019) and Resident Evil 3 (2020). These versions include visual enhancements including ray-tracing and high-framerate modes, with the PlayStation 5 version also supporting haptic feedback and adaptive triggers. Owners of the game on PlayStation 4 and Xbox One are able to upgrade for free, and a free upgrade patch for the Windows version was released simultaneously.

Versions for iOS, iPadOS, and macOS were released on July 2, 2024. It is also available in iPhone 15 Pro, iPhone 15 Pro Max, iPad, and Mac. A Nintendo Switch 2 version was released on February 27, 2026, alongside Resident Evil Village and Resident Evil Requiem.

=== Playable demonstrations ===
Shortly after the game's reveal, a playable teaser named Resident Evil 7 Teaser: Beginning Hour was released on the PlayStation Store. The demo takes place in a dilapidated house, which the unnamed male player character needs to escape. Depending on the actions taken by the player, the teaser may have three different outcomes. Capcom later revealed that the teaser was a standalone experience and not a segment of the game, which has more variety in its environments, and additional mechanics, such as combat. By July 2016, the demo had been downloaded over 2 million times. An update called the "Twilight Version" was released on September 15, 2016, and gave access to new rooms and items to find. Along with the new version, Capcom released a trailer for the game. Another update called the "Midnight Version" was released on December 3, which unlocked additional areas of the house, along with several new items to find and a puzzle concerning a riddle in the Twilight Version. The demo was released for Xbox One on December 9 and for PC on December 19.

A playable demo called Lantern was made available for attendees at Gamescom 2016, as part of revealing the first Resident Evil 7 story trailer. It makes use of found footage and first-person narrative as it tells the story of a young woman by the name of Mia hiding from an agitated old lady holding a lantern. The old lady is Marguerite Baker, who was first mentioned in Beginning Hour.

=== Downloadable content ===
Resident Evil 7 contains several DLC packs for use in the game. Several pre-order packs were available for the game, including the Recovery Set, Handgun Set, Shotgun Set, Action Set, Chem Fluid Set, and Burner Set. Each pack would add an Item Box item containing a bundle of related items (herbs and first aid meds for the Recovery Set, gunpowder and handgun ammo for the Handgun Set, shells and a first aid med for the Shotgun Set, ammo, a herb, and a lockpick for the Action Set, chemical fluid for the Chem Fluid Set, and solid and burner fuel for the Burner Set) that could be taken and used.

The first DLC pack was the Banned Footage, a series of bonus modes where the player controls Clancy Jarvis, a camera operator who was abducted by the Bakers some time prior to the main game. The Footage is split into two packs: Vol. 1 was released on January 31, 2017, for $9.99 and contains the scenarios "Nightmare", a survival mode where Clancy must hold out in the processing area against Jack Baker and an army of Molded until dawn, and "Bedroom", an escape room where Clancy must find a way out of a locked room while evading Marguerite – Vol. 1 also includes "Ethan Must Die", an extremely difficult mode where the player must unlock the greenhouse and defeat Marguerite inside while utilizing randomized weapons and items found throughout the main house to deal with enemies and booby traps along the way. Vol. 2 was released on February 14, 2017, for $14.99 and contains two more scenarios – "21", where Clancy must play a deadly game of blackjack overseen by Lucas, and "Daughters", a prequel to the main game where the player controls Zoe on the night Eveline was taken in and infected the Bakers. Vol. 2 contains "Jack's 55th Birthday", a joke game mode where the player must search the house for food to feed Jack and fill him up as fast as possible.

On December 12, 2017, Capcom released five DLC packs for $0.49 each (or $1.49 for all five in a bundle), each containing a special coin that granted a buff while in the inventory, such as enhanced damage, reload time, or health. Purchasing any of the coins would also unlock the "Madhouse" difficulty option from the start. Later, on December 14, 2017, Capcom released two new post-game scenarios: Not A Hero, which was delayed from its Q2 2017 release date, has the player control Chris Redfield as he and Blue Umbrella attempt to find Lucas and bring him to justice, and End of Zoe, released for $14.99, where the player controls Joe Baker as he tries to save Zoe from a calcified state brought on by Eveline as punishment for helping Ethan and Mia escape. While End of Zoe was developed by Capcom, development duties for Not a Hero were outsourced to HexaDrive.

The Season Pass, released on launch, contains both volumes of Banned Footage, End of Zoe, and the Recovery Kit – it was included with the Gold Edition of the game.

== Reception ==
=== Pre-release ===
Due to its first-person presentation, the game has drawn comparisons to Konami's cancelled Silent Hills game and its P.T. demo. Capcom responded to this by pointing out that Resident Evil 7 was in development long before the reveal of P.T., and dispelled any rumors about staff of P.T. having been hired to work on the game. Shacknews noted that Beginning Hour had several similarities with Sweet Home (1989), the Capcom horror game that inspired the original Resident Evil (1996). These similarities to Sweet Home include the plot of a film crew going to an abandoned house, a paranormal female presence in the house, and a tragic tale involving a family that once lived there. Eurogamer found the element of survival horror in Lantern reminiscent of Alien: Isolation. Resident Evil 7 was well-received for the dissimilarity to its polarizing predecessor, in particular the change from action-oriented combat and effects to an approach more grounded in horror.

=== Post-release ===
Reception

Aggregate score
Aggregator	Score
Metacritic	(PC) 83/100 (PS4) 86/100 (XONE) 86/100

Review scores
Publication	Score
Destructoid	10/10
Electronic Gaming Monthly	9.5/10
Famitsu	9/10, 9/10, 9/10, 9/10
Game Informer	8.5/10
GameSpot	8/10
GamesRadar+	4.5/5
Giant Bomb	4/5
IGN	7.7/10
PC Gamer (US)	90/100
Polygon	9/10

Resident Evil 7: Biohazard received "generally favorable reviews" from critics, according to review aggregator Metacritic.

Destructoid's Zack Furniss felt that the primary accomplishment of Resident Evil 7 concerned its pacing, which was praised as "masterful". Furniss' apprehensive expectations of how the story would unfold were subverted to his liking, deeming the result a blend similar to the horror and comedy found in The Evil Dead films. He found a sense of finality in the combat and lauded it for having produced lasting tension. What held more sway, however, was the priority of survival horror, with the management of limited resources meeting a positive response. Furniss considered the boss fights to be "harrowing" and welcomed the consistent surreality of the game. His playthrough with the PlayStation VR inspired unease, unpredictable jump scares and ultimately an "intuitive" experience. Ray Carsillo of EGMNow favored the atmosphere's constant mood of anxiety, which was partly impacted by the interiors of the main setting. The sound design was also thought to complement this sense of dread, increasing the level of player involvement. He noted the slow narrative build as the game's most substantial achievement, and likened its efficacy to that of earlier games in the series. Like Furniss, Carsillo expressed appreciation for the pacing, and opined that it brought considerable intrigue, accommodating lengthy play sessions. Playing with the virtual reality headset was "even more frightening than doing it normally", according to Carsillo, echoing Furniss' view that it made the game more immersive.

Writing for Game Informer, Andrew Reiner commended the "tense, unsettling, overly gory" atmosphere for providing a competent introduction to Resident Evil 7. The Baker house and the nature of exploring it posed significant interest to him, for together, they would present new aspects regarding the occupants and be enhanced by the first-person perspective. Scott Butterworth at GameSpot enjoyed the narrative overall, valuing its memorable moments and the thematic consistency of the writing. He was impressed with the reliance of atmosphere as opposed to jump scares to heighten the feeling of danger. Using the Baker family to multifarious ends of gameplay was complimented as a logical extension of the established world; the interactive VHS tapes were approved of for the same reason, said to serve "beautifully as both a narrative device and a way to break up Ethan's exhausting mission". On PlayStation VR, Butterworth mentioned that, in its employment, the element of horror appeared more realistic.

Leon Hurley, writing for GamesRadar+, was of the opinion that, while the "gore and guts" were sparingly effective, a number of his most favorite moments had to do with investigating the "beautifully designed" Baker house. As for the VR, it was dubbed as a terrifying experience "where the mildewy atmosphere gets into your soul". Giant Bomb's Dan Ryckert referred to Resident Evil 7 as the reinvigoration of earlier components in the series while at the same time yielding a fresh outlook with a yet-unrivaled story. The main antagonists bore substantial weight to Ryckert's cause for worry, and gave way to thrills when prompted to flee them. He viewed the first-person perspective as "bold", and attributed to the PlayStation VR, an earnest addition to the "scare factor". Chloi Rad of IGN endorsed the pervading tone of eeriness in the game, owed entirely to the plantation, which she thought was "one of the creepiest single settings since the Spencer Mansion". Also, she observed that the game world gave off a robust sense of place with unwavering exploration. To her, the Baker family were the most compelling of the characters because of the consequent emotional strain felt in their presence. Andy Kelly at PC Gamer began his review, writing, "It's a return to the atmospheric, slow-burning horror of the original". He disagreed with Ryckert's assessment that the first-person was a bold reinvention, instead praising it for being "classic Resident Evil through and through". Kelly saw the regular state of vulnerability he was faced within the game as one of its greatest strengths, giving credit to the visuals and audio for adding to the "rumbling sense of dread". He considered flashbacks via VHS tapes to be one of his favorite features. Polygon's Philip Kollar applauded Resident Evil 7's return to form, declaring that "no Resident Evil game since the first has done as good a job as RE7 at making me feel scared and helpless".

Conversely, Furniss observed the final boss fight and ending as disappointing. He cited issues with the PlayStation VR, including the prospect of sacrificing graphics for improved aim and immersion, as the resolution would decrease while in virtual reality. Carsillo disliked the inventory system because its restricted capacity left weaponry and ammunition with the same amount of space as other items critical to story progression. The lack of character development for the protagonist Ethan Winters was disparaged as well, with Reiner stating that the plot suffered flaws of inconsistency from this approach. Also subject to criticism was the required body movements while in seated VR mode, which were described as stomach-churning. Butterworth felt a loss of excitement by the end, blaming the repetition of certain assignments to be carried out. He faulted enemies for exerting less of a threat than was preferred in the given difficulty level. Unlike with other platforms, Butterworth detected inferior visual performance on the Xbox One with degraded colors and textures. Hurley expressed disapproval of the decision one comes across near the end of the game, calling into question its relevance by arguing that it could be quickly resolved in the event of regret. Rad criticized Resident Evil 7 for its dependence on "overplayed tropes about rural America" which came to resemble a cartoon, and the puzzles were appraised as the sole shortcoming of the setting. Kollar said the boss battles interrupted the inherent suspense.

The game won the Gold Prize, User's Choice Prizes, and the PlayStation VR Special Award at the PlayStation Awards. It was also nominated for "Best Setting" in PC Gamer's 2017 Game of the Year Awards, and won the award for "Best VR Game" in Destructoid's Game of the Year Awards 2017. It also won the People's Choice Award for "Best VR Experience" for which it was a runner-up in IGN's Best of 2017 Awards; its other nominations were for "Best Xbox One Game", "Best PlayStation 4 Game", "Best Action/Adventure Game", and "Best Graphics".

=== Sales ===
Capcom's pre-release sales projection for the game's launch window, through the end of March 2017, was 4 million units. The game had shipped over 2.5 million units worldwide days after the release, while the demo exceeded 7.15 million downloads. The modest shipment figure had an effect on Capcom's stock price, which fell more than three percent following the Tokyo Stock Exchange. It was the best-selling video game in the UK during its week of release according to Chart-Track, amounting to the third-best debut in Resident Evil history behind Resident Evil 5 (7.1 million) and Resident Evil 6 (6.6 million). 200,000 units had also been sold through Steam during that time. It ranked first in the Japanese charts for the week ending January 29; the PS4 sales totalled 187,306 units, 58.9 percent of its initial shipment. In the month of January in the United States, Resident Evil 7 sold the most out of any video game.

On February 1, Capcom communicated to its investors that the game had recouped its budget, while it remained at the top of the UK sales chart in its second week and ranked as the second-best-selling video game in the United States, behind For Honor. By April 2017, Resident Evil 7 had sold 3.5 million units worldwide, short of Capcom's expectation of 4 million. In May 2017, Capcom gave the game a lifetime sales forecast of ten million units, citing favorable reviews, marketing and downloadable content as contributing factors. The game entered the top 10 of "Capcom Platinum Titles" that passed 1 million sold units, and by September 2018, total sales reached 5.7 million, which rose to 6 million by that December, 7.5 million by March 2020, 7.9 million by June 2020, 8.5 million by December 2020, and 9 million units by March 2021. By June 2022, the game had sold 11 million units. By March 2023, it had sold 12 million units. By December 2023, it had sold 13 million units. By November 2024, the game sold 14 million units. By April 2025, it had sold 15 million units. By January 2026, it had sold 16.471 million copies. By May 2026, it had sold 17.40 million copies.By October 2026, it has sold 18.87 million copies.

=== Accolades ===
Resident Evil 7 was included in numbered lists of the best video games in 2017: 1st place for "Best Horror Game of All Time" and 6th place in the 25 Best Games of 2017 list at GamesRadar+ and 5th place at Business Insider. Vulture.com listed it among the best video games of the year. PlayStation Official Magazine – UK listed it as the fourth-best PlayStation VR game. Entertainment Weekly ranked the game 3rd on their list of the "Best Games of 2017", Polygon ranked it 5th on their list of the 50 best games of 2017, and EGMNow ranked it 7th on their list of the 25 Best Games of 2017, while Eurogamer ranked it 14th on their list of the "Top 50 Games of 2017". The Verge named it as one of their 15 Best Games of 2017. In Game Informer's Reader's Choice Best of 2017 Awards, it came in the lead for "Best VR Game", receiving the award for "Best VR Action" in their 2017 Action Game of the Year Awards.

Year	Award	Category	Result	Ref.
2016	Game Critics Awards	Best VR Game	Nominated	
2016	Golden Joystick Awards 2016	Most Wanted Game	Nominated	
2017	Golden Joystick Awards 2017	Best VR Game	Won	
2017	Golden Joystick Awards 2017	Ultimate Game of the Year	Nominated	
2017	Golden Joystick Awards 2017	Best Gaming Performance (Jack Brand)	Nominated	
2017	Ping Awards	Best International Game	Nominated	
2017	Japan Game Awards 2017	Award for Excellence	Won	
2017	The Game Awards 2017	Best Game Direction	Nominated	
2017	The Game Awards 2017	Best Audio Design	Nominated	
2017	The Game Awards 2017	Best VR/AR Game	Won	
2018	New York Game Awards 2018	Big Apple Award for Best Game of the Year	Nominated	
2018	New York Game Awards 2018	Coney Island Dreamland Award for Best Virtual Reality Game	Won	
2018	National Academy of Video Game Trade Reviewers Awards	Animation, Technical	Nominated	
2018	National Academy of Video Game Trade Reviewers Awards	Camera Direction in a Game Engine	Nominated	
2018	National Academy of Video Game Trade Reviewers Awards	Control Design, VR	Won	
2018	National Academy of Video Game Trade Reviewers Awards	Direction in a Game Cinema	Nominated	
2018	National Academy of Video Game Trade Reviewers Awards	Game, Franchise Action	Nominated	
2018	National Academy of Video Game Trade Reviewers Awards	Graphics, Technical	Nominated	
2018	National Academy of Video Game Trade Reviewers Awards	Performance in a Drama, Supporting (Katie O'Hagan)	Nominated	
2018	National Academy of Video Game Trade Reviewers Awards	Sound Effects	Won	
2018	National Academy of Video Game Trade Reviewers Awards	Sound Mixing in Virtual Reality	Won	
2018	National Academy of Video Game Trade Reviewers Awards	Use of Sound, Franchise	Won	
2018	Italian Video Game Awards	People's Choice	Nominated	
2018	Italian Video Game Awards	Game of the Year	Nominated	
2018	SXSW Gaming Awards	Excellence in SFX	Nominated	
2018	SXSW Gaming Awards	Excellence in Technical Achievement	Nominated	
2018	SXSW Gaming Awards	VR Game of the Year	Won	
2018	Game Developers Choice Awards	Best VR/AR Game	Nominated	
2018	Game Audio Network Guild Awards	Best VR Audio	Won	
2018	Famitsu Awards	Excellence Prize	Won	

== Sequel ==
A sequel, titled Resident Evil Village, was officially revealed during the PlayStation 5 reveal event. The game was released on May 7, 2021. Set a few years after the events of Resident Evil 7: Biohazard, it continues the first-person perspective and follows Ethan Winters.
