= L. Alan Winters =

Leonard Alan Winters CB (born 1950) is a professor of economics at the University of Sussex and former chief economist at the Department for International Development (DFID). His father is the composer Geoffrey Winters. His speciality is the empirical and policy analysis of international trade. He was director of the Development Research Group of the World Bank (2003–07), and had worked at the bank intermittently in a range of posts since 1994. He is a fellow at the Centre for Economic Policy Research and the IZA and a former Programme Director at the former. In the United Kingdom his previous posts have included spells at Cambridge, Bristol, Wales and Birmingham universities. He has served on several editorial boards including the World Bank Economic Review, The Economic Journal, and The World Trade Review. He has acted as a consultant for the Organisation for Economic Co-operation and Development, the Commonwealth Secretariat, the European Commission and Parliament, the United Nations Conference on Trade and Development (UNCTAD), the World Trade Organization, and the Inter-American Development Bank.

Winters was appointed Companion of the Order of the Bath (CB) in the 2012 Birthday Honours.
