= Luis Sera =

- Resident Evil character
- Luis in Resident Evil 4 (2023)
- First appearance: Resident Evil 4 (2005)
- Created by: Masaki Yamanaka
- Voiced by: English: Rino Romano (Resident Evil 4) André Peña (remake of Resident Evil 4); Japanese: Kenjiro Tsuda (remake of Resident Evil 4)
- Motion capture: Keiichi Wada (Resident Evil 4); Meddy (remake of Resident Evil 4)

In-universe information
- Nationality: Spanish

Luis Sera Navarro (Japanese: ルイス・セラ・ナヴァッロ) is a character in the Resident Evil survival horror video game series created by the Japanese company Capcom. He was introduced as a supporting character in Resident Evil 4 (2005) and later appeared in its 2023 remake. He is a biologist who assists protagonist Leon S. Kennedy on his assignment to rescue the President's daughter Ashley Graham.

Because of Peter Jackson's adaptation popularity during the game's development, artist Masaki Yamanaka created and designed Luis to look like J. R. R. Tolkien's Aragorn from The Lord of the Rings. Luis has received mixed reviews from video game publications, but his redesign and recharacterization in the 2023 remake of Resident Evil 4 received praise from critics. Several journalists have criticized his original dialogue where he sexualized Ashley; the targeted lines were removed in the remake.

== Concept and design ==
Luis Sera was one of several characters created by artist Masaki Yamanaka for the game Resident Evil 4 (2005). According to Yamanaka, Peter Jackson's adaptations were still popular during the development of Resident Evil 4, and as such, he wanted Luis to resemble Aragorn from J. R. R. Tolkien's The Lord of the Rings to rival protagonist Leon S. Kennedy as "the game's hottest man." In an interview with producer Hiroyuki Kobayashi, he stated that Leon saves Luis, but he remains a muddled figure.

Luis was voiced by American actor Rino Romano in Resident Evil 4 and by André Peña in the 2023 remake of Resident Evil 4. In Japanese, Kenjiro Tsuda voiced him in the remake of Resident Evil 4. He was motion captured by Keiichi Wada in Resident Evil 4. Luis' appearance is based on a face model Meddy in the remake of Resident Evil 4.

== Appearances ==
Luis first appeared in Resident Evil 4 (2005) as a Spanish investigator, who is familiar with the village where the game takes place. He previously worked with cult leader Osmund Saddler, researching and developing the mind-controlling parasites known as "Las Plagas". After discovering Saddler's evil intentions regarding parasites, Luis attempts to vandalize the cult's plans. He encounters Leon after they are both captured by villagers, and claims that he is a former Madrid policeman who became dissatisfied with his job. Despite assisting Leon throughout the game, Luis is ultimately killed by Saddler before he can deliver a sample of Las Plagas. Luis also appears in the expansion Separate Ways included on later ports of the game. He appears in cutscenes as contact with Ada Wong, having been promised rescue from Los Iluminados in return for a dominant plaga sample.

In the 2023 remake of Resident Evil 4, Luis' past is expanded upon by in-game files. Orphaned at birth when his mother dies in childbirth, he was brought up by his parental grandfather in a cabin on the banks of the village's lake. After his grandfather is attacked by a wolf infected with a Plaga, the village kills him due to him being infected with a plaga and burn their house to prevent it from spreading. Luis subsequently joined the Umbrella Corporation's European branch as a researcher, being involved in the team that created the Nemesis. He left Umbrella prior to investigations into the company, becoming involved with research into Las Plagas for Saddler and Los Iluminados.

Luis also appears on cards for mobile game Teppen (2019), added to the game in its "Haunted by Memories" expansion. In printed trading card media, he appears in the Bandai-produced game Resident Evil: The Deck Building Game.

== Reception ==
In academic analysis, scholar Adriana Falqueto Lemos argued that Luis Sera's exaggerated appearance, accent, and speech are all part of the fictional representation of what a Spanish guy can be, with nothing extraneous. She further said that "there are ideological projects, even if unintended, that make certain ideas of the social and the real prevail through the manufacturing of video games, so why choose to portray a Spaniard in one way and not in another?" The construction of the non-playable characters is one example of how Resident Evil 4's "spatial and temporal diegetic inconsistency" is represented in its locations, according to scholar Andrei Nae. As stated by Nae, Luis is a Madrid-based police officer and a skilled biologist who embodies the stereotypical Mexican of the nineteenth century in twentieth-century American Western films.

A line of Luis sexualizing Ashley Graham's appearance during their first encounter—"I see that the President's equipped his daughter with ballistics, too"—achieved generally unfavorable reactions from journalists. In the 2021 Resident Evil 4 VR, Luis' line in the cutscene were removed. Jons Holstrom of Dread Central described it as "cringey" and "gross". As Holstrom points out that it is not appropriate for Luis to casually sexually harass the daughter of the president, or anyone else. He added that Luis makes "suave" remarks, "but that character trope is overused and not effective. He can be cool without being a casual womanizer".

Luis' physical appearance in the 2023 remake of Resident Evil 4 divided fans. Some appreciated the redesign, while other found it notably different from Luis' prior appearance, comparing him to WWE wrestler Seth Rollins and labelling him "ugly".
