= Resident Evil 2 (2019 video game) =

Video game remake

- Cover art depicting the two main characters, Leon S. Kennedy and Claire Redfield
- Developer: Capcom
- Publisher: Capcom
- Directors: Kazunori Kadoi; Yasuhiro Anpo
- Producers: Yoshiaki Hirabayashi; Tsuyoshi Kanda
- Designer: Hidehiro Goda
- Programmer: Masatoshi Fukazawa
- Artists: Gez Fry; Satoshi Takamatsu
- Writer: Brent Friedman
- Composers: Shusaku Uchiyama; Zhenlan Kang; (Note: Others composers who worked on the soundtrack are Sakiko Sakuragi, Tadayoshi Makino, Masami Ueda, Yuichi Tsuchiya, Kentaro Nakashima, Syotaro Nakayama, Taisuke Fujisawa, Mana Ogura, Masahiro Ohki, Cody Matthew Johnson and Shimon Moore)
- Series: Resident Evil
- Engine: RE Engine
- Platforms: PlayStation 4; Windows; Xbox One; PlayStation 5; Xbox Series X/S; Nintendo Switch; iOS; iPadOS; macOS; Nintendo Switch 2
- Release: PS4, Windows, Xbox One; January 25, 2019; PS5, Xbox Series X/S; June 13, 2022; Nintendo Switch; November 11, 2022; iOS, iPadOS, macOS; December 10, 2024; Nintendo Switch 2; October 16, 2026
- Genre: Survival horror
- Mode: Single-player

Resident Evil 2 (Note: Known in Japan as Biohazard RE:2 (Japanese: バイオハザード RE:2, Hepburn: Baiohazādo Āru Ī Tsū) and commonly referred to as Resident Evil 2 Remake) is a 2019 survival horror game developed and published by Capcom. A remake of the 1998 game Resident Evil 2, it was released for PlayStation 4, Windows, and Xbox One in January 2019 and for Amazon Luna, PlayStation 5, Xbox Series X/S in June 2022, with a cloud version for Nintendo Switch released the following November. Versions for iOS, iPadOS, and macOS were released in December 2024, and a version for Nintendo Switch 2 released in October of 2026. The player controls rookie police officer Leon S. Kennedy and college student Claire Redfield as they attempt to escape Raccoon City during a viral outbreak that turns ordinary citizens into zombies and other monsters.

Capcom considered remaking Resident Evil 2 following the release of the remake of the first Resident Evil in 2002, but the producer, Shinji Mikami, did not want to divert development from Resident Evil 4 (2005). Capcom announced the Resident Evil 2 remake in 2015 and released the first trailer and gameplay footage at E3 2018. It was built on the RE Engine, which was also used for Resident Evil 7: Biohazard.

Resident Evil 2 received acclaim for its presentation, gameplay and faithfulness to the original. It won the Golden Joystick Award for Game of the Year and was nominated for the Game Award for Game of the Year. It is the highest-selling Resident Evil game, having sold more than 20.38 million copies as of October 2026. It was followed by remakes of Resident Evil 3 in 2020 and Resident Evil 4 in 2023.

== Gameplay ==
Resident Evil 2 is a survival horror third person shooter game – unlike the remake of the first game, which sought to update and improve the original experience, this remake reimagines the gameplay and story for modern audiences. The game is set in Raccoon City, a fictional mountain city in the Midwest, during a zombie apocalypse. Players choose from one of two characters, Leon S. Kennedy or Claire Redfield. Their choice affects the weapons, areas, items, subplot, supporting characters (Leon has Ada Wong, a mysterious federal agent investigating the Umbrella Corporation, and Claire has Sherry Birkin, the young daughter of an Umbrella executive being pursued by a monster) and the final boss.

Gameplay of the remake. The player, as Claire Redfield, fights a "Licker" zombie in the underground portion of the police station. The grenade launcher's Flame Rounds allow Claire to light enemies on fire.

The player is able to freely explore the environment around them while scavenging for resources such as healing items, ammunition, and key items used to solve puzzles and advance the story. Due to the technical and graphical upgrades offered by the RE Engine, the environment is rendered in full 3D using photorealism, improving its appearance and allowing for the tank controls of the original version to be replaced with a more flexible control scheme similar to Resident Evil 7: Biohazard. The player can move in any direction, rotate the camera around their character, alternate between walking and sprinting, and move around while shooting (however, standing still while aiming will tighten the crosshair, improving the accuracy and power of gunshots). Many areas are dark, requiring use of a flashlight to see in and adding an element of horror.

As the player explores, they encounter zombies and other hostile creatures that attack and attempt to kill them. The player is armed with various weapons – both Leon and Claire have their own handguns, their other weapons differ (Leon has a shotgun, magnum, and flamethrower, while Claire has a grenade launcher, submachine gun, and the "Spark Shot" stun gun). Knives and grenades, both regular and stun grenades can be found and used as sub-weapons – if an enemy pins the player, they can use a sub-weapon to push them off and save themselves from taking damage, albeit at the cost of decreased effectiveness. Zombies are much stronger than in the original, able to take more bullets before going down, get back up after being knocked down unless their head was blown off, and chase the player into different rooms. The damage model has been greatly improved, with enemies reacting to damage from gunshots in real-time and capable of having limbs blown off. Taking damage decreases the player's health, shown by a heart rate monitor in the inventory menu. If the player takes too much damage, they will die, forcing the player to restart from their last save point. Health items such as herbs and first aid spray cans can be used to heal.

The player has an inventory with eight slots which they can use to store their items and equipment. The space available can be expanded by finding hip pouches. Items in the inventory can be examined in a 3D model viewer, often used to reveal the purpose of key items, combined with others to produce beneficial items, such as combining gunpowder to create ammunition or herbs to create stronger herbal blends, or discarded if they have served their purpose. Safe rooms cannot be entered by enemies and contain item boxes, which can store spare items to be retrieved later. Safe rooms also contain typewriters, which can be used to save the player's progress – unless playing on Hardcore difficulty, the ink ribbons have been removed, allowing the player to save as much as they want (though the number of saves is still tracked).

The player frequently encounters the Tyrant, a mysterious B.O.W. developed to hunt down and kill survivors. The Tyrant cannot be killed, only momentarily brought down or stunned, and will follow the player throughout the environment except into safe rooms. This forces the player to incorporate stealth tactics to evade him as they search for puzzles and items required to progress. Both protagonists have a section where their supporting partner briefly becomes playable – Ada can use an EMF gun to hack and overload electronic devices, while Sherry can crouch to fit through small gaps and focuses more on stealth. Beating the game unlocks the "2nd Run" for the other protagonist, which remixes item locations and contains the true final boss and ending to the story. The remake adds difficulty modes - Assisted, Standard, and Hardcore - which determine the abundance of items, strength of enemies, and whether the game autosaves or requires ink ribbons to use typewriters.

Both of the bonus modes, "The 4th Survivor" and "The Tofu Survivor", return – the former is unlocked after beating the 2nd Run and follows an Umbrella Security Service mercenary codenamed Hunk as he attempts to go from the lower waterway of the sewers to a rescue helicopter outside the police station while battling through a large gauntlet of enemies. Beating it unlocks "The Tofu Survivor", which replaces Hunk with a block of tofu that only has knives – however, the remake adds characters to this mode, who have a unique item loadout. Completing specific in-game objectives, or "Records", will reward the player with concept art, 3D models of characters and items, or in some cases, special weapons with unlimited ammunition or durability.

=== The Ghost Survivors ===
"The Ghost Survivors" is a free bonus mode that is available from the beginning, and focuses on a series of "what-if" scenarios – each scenario depicts an alternate timeline where a side character who dies in the main story survives, and the player can control them as they attempt to reach a specific area in a manner similar to "The 4th Survivor" – unlike that mode, however, "The Ghost Survivors" contains special zombie types, zombies with backpacks that can be looted after killing them, and resupply machines from which the player can choose one of three items to take. The modes contain a "Training" difficulty, which gives the player an increased starting inventory and the benefits of Assisted difficulty but does not track the player's completion time.

- "No Time to Mourn" features gun shop owner Robert Kendo, who must get from the gun shop to the proposed water purification room in the sewers to reach a rescue helicopter. His mode features poison zombies, who can poison the player with their bite and release a cloud of poison after dying, and zombies wearing propane tanks that can be shot to cause a damaging explosion.
- "Runaway" features Katherine Warren, the mayor's daughter, who must get from the director's room of the orphanage to the jail in the police station to save her boyfriend Ben, another side character who dies in the main story. Her mode features "Pale Heads", which are faster than regular zombies and have regenerative abilities.
- "Forgotten Soldier" features Ghost, a special ops agent like Hunk, who must get to the cable car of the laboratory to escape before the self-destruct sequence activates. His mode features the Tyrant and zombies wearing bulletproof armor.
- "No Way Out", unlocked by clearing the main story, features Sheriff Daniel Cortini. Cortini is the only character who has different gameplay from the others – here, he must hold out in the gas station against waves of zombies breaking in and kill 100 (70 in Training) to be rescued by Leon and complete the scenario. His mode features every special zombie type seen in the previous modes.

"The Ghost Survivors" has its own set of Records separate from the main story, which unlock cosmetic hats the player can wear. While these have no effect on gameplay, one, the cat ears, grants infinite ammo.

== Synopsis ==
=== Plot ===
On the night of September 29, 1998 two months after the events of the Spencer Mansion Incident, (Note: As depicted in Resident Evil (1996 video game) and Resident Evil (2002 remake)) rookie police officer Leon S. Kennedy makes his way toward Raccoon City to start his first shift at the Raccoon City Police Department. At a gas station on the city outskirts, he meets Claire Redfield who is looking for her brother, Chris Redfield. The gas station is suddenly overrun by zombies, as well as the rest of Raccoon City, after a strain of the T-virus contaminated the city's water supply. The two reach the police station but are forced to separate when a truck crashes and explodes, and later discover the station to be swarming with zombies. The player character (either Leon or Claire) meets an infected Lieutenant Marvin Branagh, who reveals a secret passage leading out of the station before later succumbing to his bite. The player character (Note: The game features multiple scenarios where the player character faces most of the same bosses.) eventually reaches the underground passage, where they are attacked by a mutated William Birkin, Umbrella's leading scientist, whom they fight off before escaping.

In the parking garage, Leon is attacked by zombie dogs, but is saved by Ada Wong. Ada claims to be an FBI agent sent to retrieve an incriminating sample of the G-virus, the virus responsible for Birkin's mutation, which he developed with his wife and coworker Annette. Meanwhile, Claire finds paperwork revealing her brother had left Raccoon City weeks prior to investigate Umbrella overseas. She runs into a lost Sherry Birkin, the young daughter of William and Annette, and resolves to protect her.

After investigating Umbrella, journalist Ben Bertolucci is detained in a holding cell by the corrupt police chief and serial killer Brian Irons, who has been covering up Umbrella's activities. Ben tries to convince Leon to release him, but is attacked and killed by the Tyrant, a humanoid bioweapon created and programmed by the Umbrella Corporation to eliminate everyone within the station. Leon and Ada flee and reach Robert Kendo's gun shop, where they find Robert and his infected daughter Emma. Witnessing Robert put down his daughter before committing suicide, Leon decides to help Ada retrieve the G-virus sample to expose Umbrella's corruption. After killing a giant, mutated alligator in the sewers, the two encounter Annette, who shoots Leon in the back before escaping to Umbrella's underground lab, NEST, unwilling to give up the G-virus sample. Leon recovers; he and Ada kiss as they descend into NEST.

Meanwhile, Sherry is abducted by Irons and taken to the Raccoon City Orphanage. William arrives and injects Irons with a "G-embryo", which bursts from Irons' stomach, killing him. He incapacitates Claire and deliberately infects Sherry, confident that her body will accept the G-virus and allow it to replicate.

Finding Sherry and descending underground into NEST, Claire retrieves a vaccine for the G-virus, which Annette administers to her daughter. Meanwhile, Leon retrieves the G-virus sample and runs into Annette again, who outs Ada as a mercenary intending to sell the sample to the highest bidder. William kills Annette; Ada demands the sample from Leon at gunpoint, but is knocked off into the abyss below NEST, along with the sample, as the facility starts to self-destruct. Leon then defeats the mutated and deadlier "Super Tyrant" after Ada, having survived her fall, throws him a rocket launcher before departing. He, Claire, and Sherry escape on a train out of the facility, where they are attacked by William once more in his final mutated form. They manage to decouple the train cars and William is destroyed in the lab's destruction. As the three reach safety, Leon and Claire vow to continue their fight against Umbrella.

=== The Ghost Survivors ===
In No Time to Mourn, the player controls Robert Kendo, the owner of gun shop Kendo. While Robert survived the initial fallout, he lost his will to live after both his wife and his daughter Emma succumbed to the T-virus. Robert is encountered briefly in Leon's campaign after Leon escapes the police station, putting down his daughter before committing suicide. In this alternate scenario, before Robert can pull the trigger on his shotgun, he receives a radio message from a longtime friend, who managed to call a rescue helicopter for them both to escape in. Bidding goodbye to his daughter, Robert reaches the helicopter in the sewers and escapes from Raccoon City unharmed.

In Runaway, the player controls Katherine Warren, the mayor's daughter, who was invited to the orphanage by Chief Irons to see her boyfriend Ben, only to be attacked by Irons and killed. Her corpse can be found on a table in the director's room. In the alternate scenario, Katherine manages to grab a knife off the table and stab Irons in the throat, killing him. Taking the prison keys off his corpse, Katherine makes her way back to the police station, where she reaches Ben's cell and frees him. The two lovers then embrace each other in a hug, though their fate is left uncertain.

In Forgotten Soldier, the player controls Ghost, a special ops agent who was killed by William Birkin after he mutated into G. In this alternate scenario, Ghost narrowly survives the encounter and makes his way to NEST to finish his mission in securing the G-Virus sample. Searching the facility moments before it self-destructs, he retrieves the G-Virus sample dropped after Ada's fall. Ghost manages to escape on a cable car and sets off for safety, but is then held at gunpoint by Ada, who takes the sample off him. Ghost's fate is left uncertain.

In No Way Out, the player controls Daniel Cortini, a local sheriff who investigates the gas station following reports of cannibalistic murders in the area - he is killed by the first zombie the player encounters and turns soon after. In the alternate scenario, Daniel manages to overpower and kill the zombie but becomes trapped inside the station as it goes under siege. Fending off numerous waves of zombies, Daniel is eventually saved by Leon just as he is overpowered, and the two set off for Raccoon City in the same manner as the beginning of the game. Their fate is left uncertain, although it is implied that Cortini would take Claire's place in the story.

== Development ==
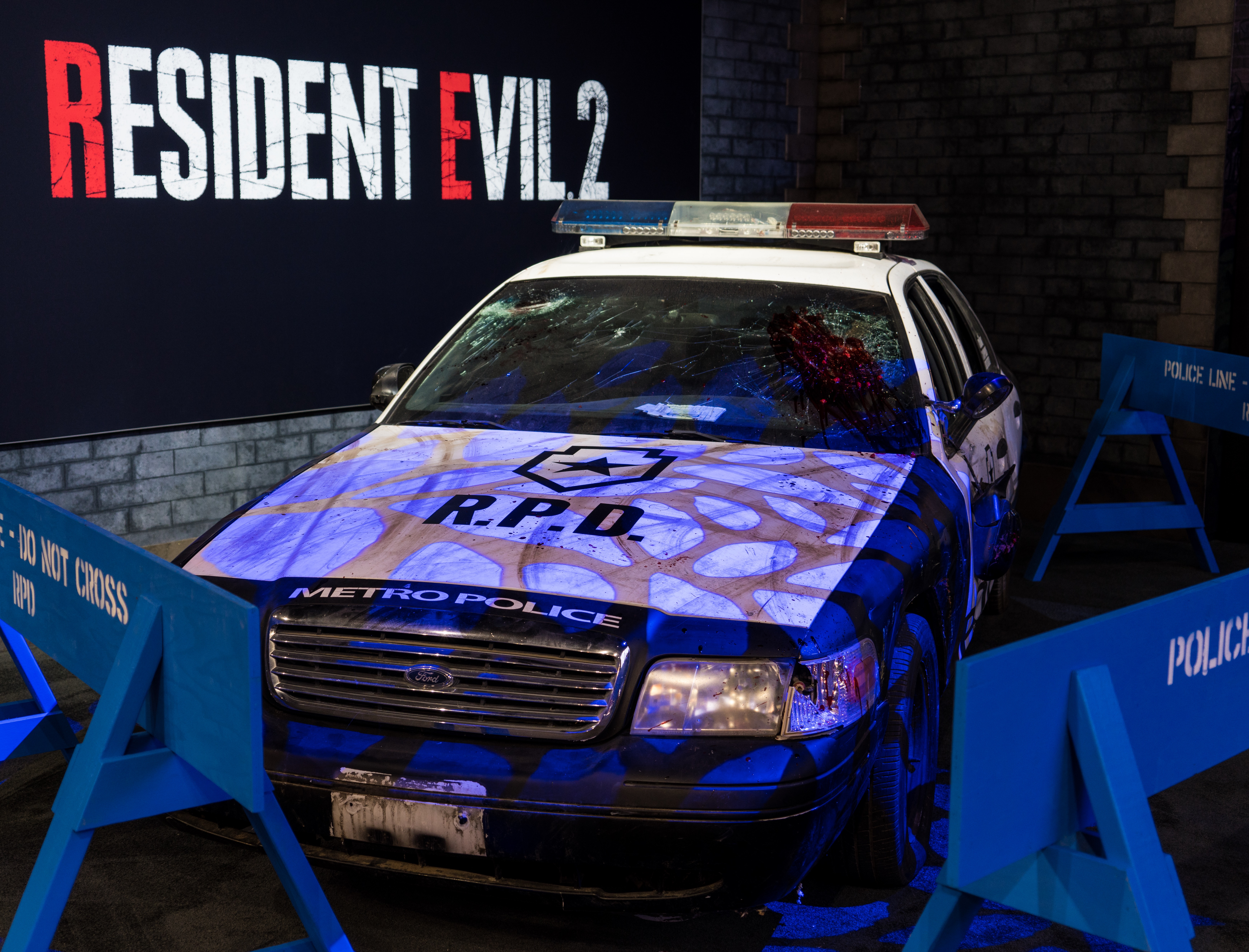
Promotional booth at E3 2018

Following the release of the 2002 remake of the first Resident Evil for the GameCube, Capcom considered a similar remake of Resident Evil 2, which was released for the PlayStation in 1998, but series creator Shinji Mikami did not want to divert development away from Resident Evil 4. In August 2015, producer Yoshiaki Hirabayashi announced in a video that the remake had been approved and was in active development, ending the video with the phrase "we do it". No further details were released until Sony's E3 2018 press conference, when Capcom released the debut trailer and gameplay footage and removed "Remake" from the title. Hideki Kamiya, director of the original Resident Evil 2, said that he had pushed Capcom to create a remake for years. Hirabayashi said the team was striving to capture the spirit of the original game, and that the team incorporated feedback received about Resident Evil 6, a game he also produced.

To meet modern expectations, the team altered some character designs to better match the more photorealistic setting; for example, Leon no longer wears large shoulder pads, which were added to distinguish his original, low-polygon model. Though they strove to make a "modern, accessible" game, they focused on horror over action, hoping to preserve a claustrophobic feel. The game uses the RE Engine, the same game engine used for Resident Evil 7: Biohazard (2017), which allowed Capcom to modernize the gameplay. Producer Tsuyoshi Kanda acknowledged the difficulty of making zombies seem scary and threatening, as they had become ubiquitous in entertainment media since the release of the original Resident Evil in 1996. By removing the fixed camera angles, the team had to use different ways to conceal enemies, using elements such as room layout, lighting, and smoke. The new camera system affected the sound design, as it no longer made sense for sound to come from a fixed source. The faces of several character models are based on scans of real people - for example, Leon S. Kennedy is based on the model Eduard Badaluta, Claire Redfield is based on the model Jordan McEwen, and Marvin Branagh is based on the music producer Patrick Levar.

The game features a Dolby Atmos soundtrack. Due to Capcom's decision to use non-union voice actors, the majority of the characters in the game were recast from their prior appearances, with TJ Rotolo and Keith Silverstein (William Birkin and HUNK's voice actors respectively since 2007's Resident Evil: The Umbrella Chronicles) being the only exceptions The game was censored in Japan. It received a "CERO D" rating, as well as an uncensored "Z rating".

== Release ==
Before the game came out, a demo known as the 1-Shot Demo was released on January 11, 2019. The demo was released on all major platforms and had a hard time limit of 30 minutes, ending after the timer ran out. The demo sees the player in the beginning stages of the game as Leon Kennedy and ends with a cinematic trailer promoting the full release. The 1-Shot Demo received over 4.7 million downloads worldwide. Although players criticized the 30 minute timer, the same demo would eventually be released as the R.P.D. Demo without the timer (and a Nemesis easter egg to promote the upcoming Resident Evil 3 remake).

Resident Evil 2 was released on PlayStation 4, Windows, and Xbox One worldwide on January 25, 2019. It supports enhancements on the PlayStation 4 Pro and Xbox One X, offering either 4K resolution or 60 frames per second. A collector's edition was made available for the console versions, featuring extras such as a Leon S. Kennedy figurine, a hardcover art book, a R.P.D. renovation poster, and a digital soundtrack.

On December 12, 2019, a final update was introduced to the Resident Evil 2 remake where the protagonist of Resident Evil 3, Jill Valentine, has written a letter to Kendo. This letter can be found at Kendo's gun shop right after Leon and Ada escape from the police station. Reading this letter also unlocks an achievement called "Chasing Jill".

Versions for PlayStation 5 and Xbox Series X/S were announced on March 2, 2022, and released digitally on June 13, 2022, alongside upgrades for Resident Evil 7: Biohazard (2017) and Resident Evil 3 (2020). These versions include visual enhancements including ray-tracing and high-framerate modes, with the PlayStation 5 version supporting haptic feedback and adaptive triggers. Owners on PlayStation 4 and Xbox One can upgrade free, and a free upgrade patch for the Windows version was released simultaneously. A version for Amazon Luna was announced on May 26, 2022, and was subsequently released on June 9, 2022. A Nintendo Switch cloud version was released on November 11, 2022. Versions for iOS, iPadOS, and macOS were released on December 10, 2024. A Nintendo Switch 2 version was announced during the September 2026 installment of Nintendo Direct and released for a digital release on October 16, 2026 alongside ports of the Resident Evil 3 and Resident Evil 4 remakes, with a physical version set to follow in January 2027.

=== Other versions ===
In October 2022, Capcom Japan and Universal Entertainment released a Pachislot for casinos, PACHI-SLOT BIOHAZARD RE:2. The characters fate in battle is decided according to the result obtained in a roulette. It also features bonus modes where players must defend themselves from enemies.

A spin-off game for arcade systems, Resident Evil 2: Arcade, known in Japan as Biohazard RE:2: Arcade (Baiohazādo Āru Ī Tsū Ākēdo), was announced by Bandai Namco in 2025. It is a rail shooter where players gain points using light guns to aim at the screen shooting enemies similar to the House of the Dead series, featuring realistic recoil gun controllers, 2-player co-op, floor vibration/air blast effects and 5.1 surround sound speakers with a built-in subwoofer. The game includes two modes: story and survival, the latter challenges players to test their accuracy while managing limited ammunition. It is slated to be released in spring 2027.

=== Downloadable content ===
Resident Evil 2 contains various downloadable content (DLC) packs. It includes five DLC costumes for Leon and Claire: Leon has a sheriff outfit and a noir outfit, while Claire has a military outfit, a noir outfit, and the motorcycle suit worn by Elza Walker, the protagonist of the original game's development build - the noir outfits allow the player to play using a black-and-white filter. There are also three different variations of the "Samurai Edge" handgun, based on the models used by Chris Redfield, Jill Valentine, and Albert Wesker in the first Resident Evil game, which were also released - the Chris and Jill models were included as bonus for players who pre-ordered the game. Finally, the Original Ver. Soundtrack Swap, allowed the player to replace the soundtrack with the original.

Later, on February 15, 2019, Capcom released the original models for Leon and Claire from the 1998 release as free DLC. A third bonus mode, The Ghost Survivors, features four bonus missions: "No Time to Mourn", "Runaway", "Forgotten Soldier", and "No Way Out". The mode centers around side characters who die in the main story, and depicts alternate, non-canon scenarios where they survive. "No Time to Mourn" (featuring gun shop owner Robert Kendo, who commits suicide after putting down his infected daughter), "Runaway" (Katherine Warren, the mayor's daughter who is normally murdered by Chief Irons), and "Forgotten Soldier" (Ghost, a special ops agent who survives G's assault) require the player to reach a destination as they make their way through waves of special enemies, while "No Way Out" (Sheriff Daniel Cortini, who is normally killed by a zombie at the beginning of the game), which is unlocked after completing the other three missions, requires the player to defeat a wave of a hundred zombies inside the gas station from the beginning of the game.

== Reception ==
Reception

Aggregate scores
Aggregator	Score
Metacritic	(PC) 89/100 (PS4) 91/100 (XONE) 93/100
OpenCritic	97%

Review scores
Publication	Score
Destructoid	9/10
Electronic Gaming Monthly	5/5
Famitsu	37/40
Game Informer	9.5/10
GameRevolution	10/10
GameSpot	9/10
IGN	9.0/10
USgamer	4.5/5

Resident Evil 2 received "universal acclaim" for the PlayStation 4 and Xbox One versions, and "generally favorable reviews" for the Windows version from critics, according to review aggregator Metacritic. OpenCritic reports that 97% of 205 critic reviews recommend the game, with critics praising its scariness, gameplay, and faithfulness to the original. The consensus on the website states: "Resident Evil 2 is a gold-standard for how to do a remake, combining the original's nostalgia with modernized and fresh gameplay to bring an awesome experience for players old and new. This may be the best Resident Evil game ever released."

Ben Reeves of Game Informer wrote that "Resident Evil 2 not only looks great, it plays well, and it forces you into a series of dark encounters that are a total rush." Keith Stuart of The Guardian wrote that it was "a reminder of how beautifully crafted survival horror games were in their heyday." The Daily Telegraph's Tom Hoggins described the game as a "thrilling return to the legacy of the 1998 original".

IGN's Daemon Hatfield originally gave the game an 8.8 in their review, increasing it to a 9.0 after being made aware of the unlockable second playthrough that presents the story from another point of view. He stated in his review that "Capcom did a fantastic job of resurrecting all the best parts of the classic Resident Evil 2 and making it look, sound, and play like a 2019 game."

Chris Carter of Destructoid called the game "A hallmark of excellence. There may be flaws, but they are negligible and won't cause massive damage." Aoife Wilson of Eurogamer described it as "a masterly reimagining of a modern classic". Polygon's Michael McWhertor wrote that Resident Evil 2 showcases "the very best of survival horror"; similar praise was expressed by Heather Alexandra of Kotaku, who wrote that the game "provides some of the best moments in the franchise". Alessandro Fillari of GameSpot said that with Resident Evil 2 "the classic survival horror franchise embraces its past in a new, exciting way".

=== Sales ===
Three million copies of Resident Evil 2 were shipped in its first week of release and four million in its first month, with more than one million on Windows. It became Capcom's second biggest launch on Steam after Monster Hunter: World from 2018. Resident Evil 2 debuted at number two on the Japanese charts with 252,848 retail sales, after Kingdom Hearts III. As of March, it was among the top 20 bestselling video games in Japan with more than 352,000 sold copies. Resident Evil 2 also topped the UK charts, becoming Capcom's biggest UK launch since Resident Evil 7: Biohazard (2017) in physical retail sales. It was the UK's best-selling game in January 2019, despite being available for only two days.

By December 2019, Resident Evil 2 had sold over 5.8 million copies, overtaking the sales of the original. It had sold more than 10 million copies by July 2022, and 13.9 million copies by March 2024. By April 2025, it had sold 15.8 million copies. In July 2026, it became the highest-selling Resident Evil game at 19.75 million copies, ahead of Resident Evil 5 (2009). The game had sold over 20 million copies by September 2026, partially attributed to a 50% surge in sales for the PlayStation 5 version ahead of the release of the film Resident Evil that month.By October 2026, it has sold 20.38 million copies.

== Awards ==
Year	Award	Category	Result	Ref.
2018	Game Critics Awards	Best of Show	Won	
2018	Game Critics Awards	Best Console Game	Nominated	
2018	Game Critics Awards	Best Action/Adventure Game	Nominated	
2019	Japan Game Awards	Award for Excellence	Won	
2019	Golden Joystick Awards	Best Audio	Won	
2019	Golden Joystick Awards	Ultimate Game of the Year	Won	
2019	Hollywood Music in Media Awards	Original Song - Video Game ("Saudade")	Won	
2019	The Game Awards 2019	Game of the Year	Nominated	
2019	The Game Awards 2019	Best Game Direction	Nominated	
2019	The Game Awards 2019	Best Audio Design	Nominated	
2019	The Game Awards 2019	Best Action/Adventure Game	Nominated	
2020	23rd Annual D.I.C.E. Awards	Adventure Game of the Year	Nominated	
2020	23rd Annual D.I.C.E. Awards	Outstanding Achievement in Art Direction	Nominated	
2020	23rd Annual D.I.C.E. Awards	Outstanding Achievement in Audio Design	Nominated	
2020	SXSW Gaming Awards	Excellence in SFX	Nominated	
