= Resident Evil 4 (2023 video game) =

Video game remake

- Cover art featuring Leon and Ashley
- Developer: Capcom (Note: With additional work and development support from K2 Inc)
- Publisher: Capcom
- Directors: Yasuhiro Anpo; Kazunori Kadoi
- Producer: Yoshiaki Hirabayashi
- Designer: Hidehiro Goda
- Programmer: Masatoshi Fukazawa
- Artist: Hirofumi Nakaoka
- Writer: Matthew Costello
- Composer: Kota Suzuki (Note: Others composers who worked in the soundtrack are Shusaku Uchiyama, Nozomi Ohmoto, Misao Senbongi, Craig McConnell, Ayaki Mori and Tamayo Kawamoto)
- Series: Resident Evil
- Engine: RE Engine
- Platforms: PlayStation 4; PlayStation 5; Windows; Xbox Series X/S; PlayStation VR2; iOS (Note: Compatible exclusively with devices using the Apple A17 Pro or newer); iPadOS; macOS; Nintendo Switch 2
- Release: PS4, PS5, Win, XSX/S; March 24, 2023; PlayStation VR2; December 8, 2023; iOS, iPadOS, macOS; December 20, 2023; Nintendo Switch 2; October 16, 2026
- Genre: Survival horror
- Mode: Single-player

Resident Evil 4 (Note: Known in Japan as Biohazard RE:4 (Japanese: バイオハザード RE:4, Hepburn: Baiohazādo RE:4) and commonly referred to as Resident Evil 4 Remake) is a 2023 survival horror game developed and published by Capcom. A remake of the 2005 game Resident Evil 4, it was released for PlayStation 4, PlayStation 5, Windows, and Xbox Series X/S on March 24, 2023. Versions for iOS, iPadOS, and macOS were released on December 20, 2023, and a version for Nintendo Switch 2 released on October 16, 2026.

Players control the US agent Leon S. Kennedy, who must save Ashley Graham, the daughter of the US president, from a mysterious cult in rural Spain. The remake has an updated plot, new visuals, characters, cast, and modernized gameplay, in line with Biohazard (2017), Village (2021) and other Resident Evil remakes. The team expanded Ashley's characterization and relationship with Leon and used Capcom's RE Engine. Two pieces of downloadable content were released: the minigame Mercenaries, in which players battle waves of enemies, and the side story Separate Ways, in which players control the agent Ada Wong.

Resident Evil 4 received critical acclaim and was nominated for the Golden Joystick Award for Ultimate Game of the Year and The Game Award for Game of the Year. It had sold over 10 million copies by April 2025, making it the fastest-selling Resident Evil game, until being surpassed by Resident Evil Requiem in 2026. As of October 2026, Resident Evil 4 has sold a total of 17.15 million copies.

== Gameplay ==
Resident Evil 4 is a remake of the 2005 game Resident Evil 4. It features "over-the-shoulder" third-person shooter gameplay similar to the original, while drawing other design aspects from the remakes of Resident Evil 2 (2019) and Resident Evil 3 (2020). Resident Evil 4 features redesigned visuals, designed to create a tenser atmosphere, along with new character designs and backgrounds. It offers six control schemes, including one styled after the original game. Occasionally the player must solve puzzles to reach certain areas. In some sequences, Leon must protect the president's daughter, Ashley. She uses a simpler health system than in the original, and can be instructed to stay close or far.

As in the original game, the player organizes their inventory with an attaché case. New to the remake, a crafting system enables the player to create items and ammunition using collected resources. The Merchant returns, allowing the player to buy, upgrade, and trade items while providing new side quests that can be completed during the main story. Similarly to the original, the focus of combat is shooting enemies and reloading. However, Leon can now move and use weapons at the same time, allowing him to evade attacks while firing and reload while on the move. Leon can use melee attacks to injure enemies and push them away. A new parrying mechanic allows him to block, counterattack, and kill downed enemies with his knife. Unlike the original, Leon's knife has a durability meter; if broken, the player will have to speak to the Merchant to get it repaired or increase its durability. Leon can carry multiple types of knives with various attributes.

The gameplay remains largely the same in the Separate Ways DLC, with the addition of a grappling hook mechanic, that allows Ada to reach previously inaccessible locations and perform melee attacks on enemies from a distance. Attaching a specific charm allows Ada to use her grappling hook to rip shields away from certain enemies. Additionally, Ada possesses an Internal Retinal Inquiry System (I.R.I.S) that allows her to see clues invisible to the naked eye, aiding her in her mission.

== Plot ==
Following the destruction of Raccoon City in 1998, (Note: As depicted in Resident Evil 2 and Resident Evil 3) Leon S. Kennedy (Nick Apostolides / Toshiyuki Morikawa) participates in a special programme and undergoes training with Major Jack Krauser (Mike Kovac / Kengo Tsuji) after agreeing to become an agent for the United States government. Six years later, in 2004, Leon is sent by the president to rescue his kidnapped daughter, Ashley Graham (Genevieve Buechner / Akari Kito), from a village in rural Spain with the remote assistance of Ingrid Hunnigan (Raylene Harewood / Yu Sugimoto). Soon after arriving, Leon finds his escorts brutally murdered by the villagers, who are being controlled by the parasite Las Plagas and have pledged their loyalty to the Los Illuminados cult. Searching for Ashley, Leon meets Luis Serra (André Peña / Kenjiro Tsuda), a scientist on the run from the cult whom Ingrid confirms once worked for the Umbrella Corporation. Leon and Luis are captured by the village head, Chief Bitores Méndez (Jon Bryant / Takeshi Oda), who injects Leon with a Plaga parasite. After escaping captivity, the pair separate.

Leon learns that Ashley is being kept inside the village's old church and rescues her. She has also been infected with a Plaga. They are pursued by Méndez and a horde of villagers until Leon kills him inside an abandoned warehouse. With their rescue helicopter delayed by inclement weather, the pair retreat to a castle to seek shelter but Lord Ramón Salazar's (Marcio Moreno / Chō) forces capture Ashley. Leon briefly re-encounters Ada Wong (Lily Gao / Junko Minagawa) following their last encounter in Raccoon City. Leon battles his way throughout the castle before reuniting with Luis underground, who provides suppressants for the Plagas and reveals he wants to atone for his actions while working as an Umbrella researcher and for Los Illuminados. The pair use mining tunnels to reach the surface, but Luis is fatally stabbed by Krauser, who engages Leon in combat until Luis forces him to retreat. Before he dies, Luis gives Leon the key to his personal lab so the latter can cure himself and Ashley. Upon returning to the castle, Leon battles and kills Salazar before receiving Ada's help in pursuing Krauser, who has taken Ashley to an island facility.

Fighting through the island, Leon reunites with Ashley, but they encounter Osmund Saddler (Christopher Jane / Hōchū Ōtsuka), Los Illuminados' leader who intends to send the infected Ashley back to the United States to infect her father so he can take over the world. Saddler uses their Plagas to control Ashley and incapacitate Leon, separating them again. While moving through the facility, Leon discovers Krauser kidnapped Ashley and brought her to the village out of resentment against the United States government for their handling of "Operation Javier", a mission he narrowly survived two years prior that resulted in his entire unit being killed. (Note: As depicted in Resident Evil: The Darkside Chronicles) Desiring power, Krauser uses a Plaga to mutate himself and fight Leon, who reluctantly kills him. Leon reunites with Ashley again but Saddler returns and attempts to kill Leon until Ada intervenes, allowing Leon to take Ashley to Luis's lab and remove their parasites. While searching for a means of escape, Leon rescues Ada from Saddler before joining forces with her to kill him, who drops a vial of Plaga amber. Ada takes the vial and leaves in a helicopter while Leon and Ashley escape the exploding island on a jet ski.

=== Separate Ways ===
Prior to Leon's arrival, Ada frees Luis from Salazar's dungeon so he can procure a vial of Plaga amber he had hidden for her, but gets infected with a unique Plaga by one of Salazar's enforcers, Pesanta. While attempting to rendezvous with Luis and evading Pesanta, Ada covertly assists Leon in his fight against Los Illuminados. As her infection worsens, Ada's increasingly impatient boss, Albert Wesker (Craig Burnatowski / Jouji Nakata), periodically checks in on her. She eventually reunites with Luis, who realizes she is infected and convinces her to collect ingredients for a suppressant to slow her, Leon, and Ashley's infections. Complicating matters, Ada's condition worsens further in the amber's presence, forcing the pair to separate once more until her suppressant takes hold. While Luis helps Leon and Ashley, Ada kills Pesanta, which causes her to vomit her parasite. After killing it, she tries to find Luis again, only to learn Krauser killed him for the amber.

Ada helps Leon reach Los Illuminados' island facility before secretly placing a tracker on him and breaking off to find Krauser. She witnesses him give the amber to Saddler before Wesker provides a device to help her bypass the facility's security. Upon learning Wesker also intends to detonate the island, regardless of Ashley's survival, Ada uses Luis's files to sabotage the bombs before using Leon's tracker to locate Saddler. She rescues Leon and Ashley and defeats Saddler, but he catches her off-guard and captures her. Leon eventually rescues Ada, who joins him in killing Saddler before retrieving the amber. As she leaves, she contacts Wesker to inquire about his intentions for the amber. When he promises a "new dawn will break" at the cost of billions of casualties, a disgusted Ada forces her pilot to change course.

Wesker learns of Ada's betrayal and that the island is still intact due to the bombs not detonating correctly. Having obtained Krauser's body, an undeterred Wesker proclaims the "age of man" will soon end.

== Development ==
Capcom brought the development in-house in early 2021, led by the Division 1 team, with many staff members who worked on the 2019 remake of Resident Evil 2 returning for Resident Evil 4. Producer Yoshiaki Hirabayashi said he found the idea of remaking Resident Evil 4 challenging as a result of its popularity. Kazunori Kadoi and Yasuhiro Anpo, who worked on the Resident Evil 2 remake, were selected as directors. Kadoi supervised gameplay elements, most notably how to use Leon's knife and its durability after encounters with enemies. Capcom minimized the use of quick time events in comparison to the original game. The development team was split into three groups that worked on three areas: the village, the castle and the island.

The team aimed to expand Ashley's characterization and relationship and make the story more horror-focused. The visuals were developed to improve the idea of horror. The game was developed using the RE Engine. While the Japanese voice actors for Leon and Ada in the Resident Evil 2 remake returned to reprise their roles, Nick Apostolides returned from Resident Evil 2 remake to voice Leon in English. The English-language voice of Ada was recast to Lily Gao (who previously portrayed the character in the 2021 film Resident Evil: Welcome to Raccoon City), replacing Jolene Andersen. Gao deleted her Instagram posts after she was harassed online, later responding to critics with: "My Ada is a survivor. She is unpredictable, resilient, and absolutely not a stereotype." D.C. Douglas, the long time English voice of Wesker, did not return; he was instead portrayed by Craig Burnatowski. As with previous Resident Evil remakes, an additional cast provided likenesses, 3D modeling and performance capture. The Dutch model Ella Freya provided the face model for Ashley, while Genevieve Buechner provided her voice.

The team modernized the gameplay to be in line with Resident Evil Village (2021) and the remakes of Resident Evil 2 and Resident Evil 3. To assist in aiming, the original game used a laser sight on each weapon; this was replaced with a reticule. To appease fans preferring the laser, Capcom included it as an attachment early on. As with Resident Evil 2, the knife has limited durability and becomes worn with use, but can be modified. A new addition is the bolt thrower, a crossbow which can be used to stealthily kill enemies. The Ganados were reworked as more dangerous, forcing the player to use the environment against them, such as igniting flammable objects or barricading doors and windows. Changes to the environment are saved in the game, so return visits to the area will acknowledge the moved or destroyed objects. When grabbed by an enemy, the player can press buttons or use the knife to escape. As the Ganados' signature move is for their Plaga parasites to erupt from their bodies, work was done to incorporate this into gameplay, with them dropping to the floor and convulsing instead of them immediately erupting; this action forces the player to ignore nearby enemies and prioritise killing the downed Ganado, putting themselves at risk.

The team aimed to expand Ashley's characterization and relationship with Leon. In contrast to the original, Ashley cannot be left alone and will always follow Leon, though she can be told to stay close or maintain distance. Yasuhiro Ampo, co-director of the remake, explained the change: "As a character, we wanted to have her by your side so she left an impression, and as a game, having her hide while you went and fought in the original was fun in some ways. But having a character like Ashley and then having her basically disappear for a while felt like a waste. We wanted to avoid that in the remake." To maintain the challenge, Ashley's health bar has been removed and can no longer be boosted with the use of yellow herbs. When she takes severe damage, she falls and must be revived to avoid a game over, a similar idea used in Resident Evil 6. She can also be picked up and carried away by enemies, and if carried too far away from Leon without being saved, the game ends. Her outfit and overall design were altered to look and act more like a true partner than a damsel in distress. Like the original game, Ashley can be sent out at times, with the player being able to lead her through holes to unlock doors. Unlike the original game, Ashley can descend a ladder on her own, rather than force the player to assist her.

While conducting their replays of the 2005 game for ideas, the developers took notice of the Blue Medallion mini-quest in the village, which was not replicated elsewhere in the game. New mini-quests were added to the village, with Leon being rewarded for finding certain items and hunting target enemies to the Merchant.

== Release and marketing ==
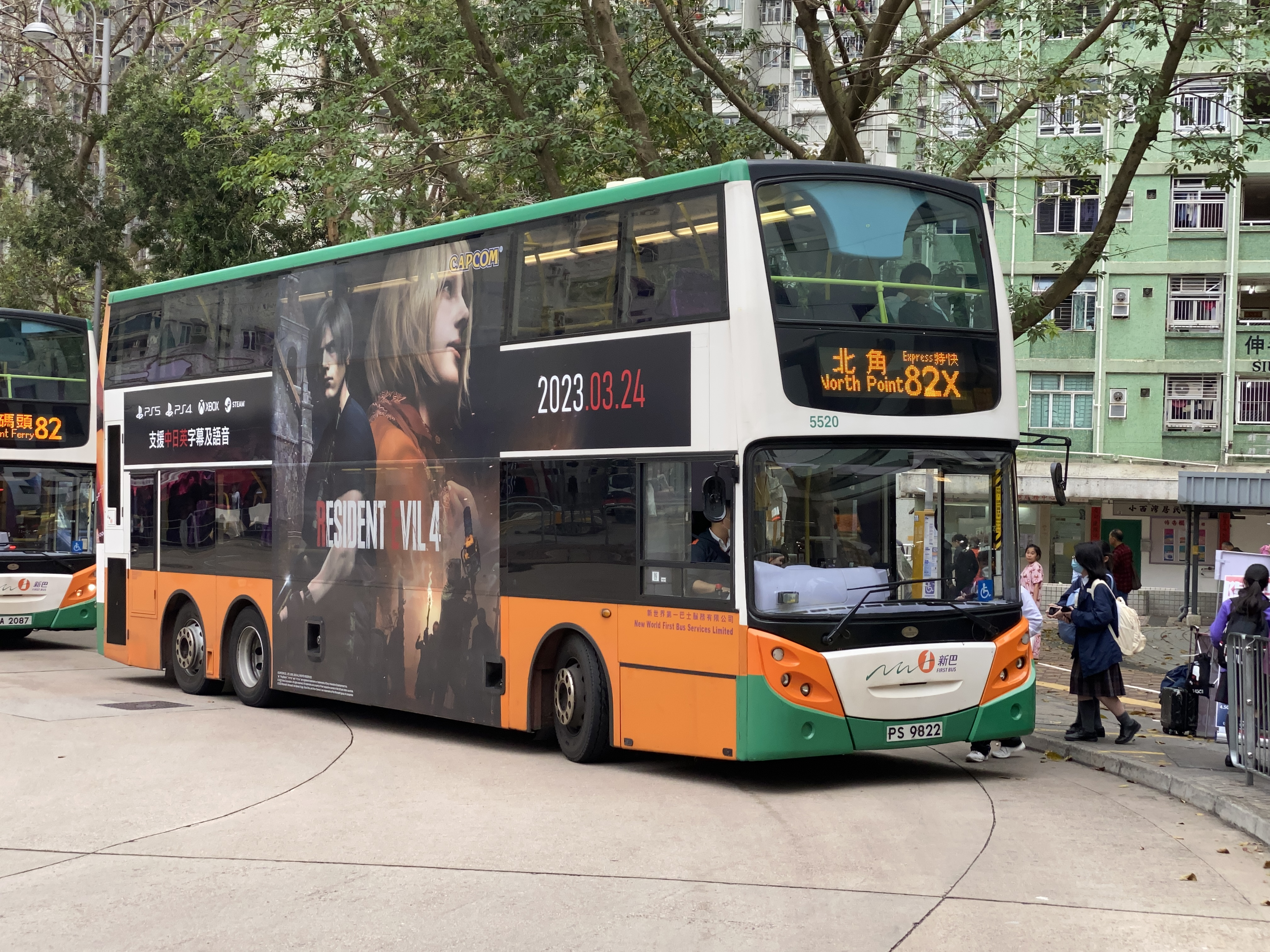
Promotion of Resident Evil 4 featuring Leon and Ashley

The first teaser trailer was released as a part of the PlayStation State of Play presentation on June 3, 2022. It was released for PlayStation 4, PlayStation 5, Windows, and Xbox Series X/S on March 24, 2023, with upcoming support on PS VR2. A version for macOS and iOS on select iPad, Mac and iPhone models was released on December 20, 2023. A Nintendo Switch 2 version was announced during the September 2026 installment of Nintendo Direct, and released digitally on October 16, 2026 alongside ports of the Resident Evil 2 and Resident Evil 3 remakes, will be followed by a physical release in January 2027.

A second trailer and additional gameplay were shown during a showcase in October 2022. Preorders include Leon's briefcase and Leon's handgun ammo as charms. A third trailer debuted as a part of PlayStation's State of Play on February 23, 2023. After the rain effects in preview footage drew criticism, Yoshiaki said Capcom would release a patch on the day of the game's release to modify it.

A playable demo was announced during a Capcom Spotlight livestream on March 9, 2023, and released immediately afterwards for PlayStation 4, PlayStation 5, Windows, and Xbox Series X/S. On March 20, 2023, Capcom released a series of three television commercials in Japan that parodies the anime series World Masterpiece Theater, created in collaboration with Nippon Animation, the studio that produced the animation for the series. A collector's edition was made available for the console versions, featuring extras such as a Leon figurine, a hardcover artbook, a village map poster, and a digital soundtrack. Lily Gao, who provided the voice of Ada Wong, was harassed on social media by players who were unhappy with her performance.

=== Downloadable content ===
On April 7, 2023, The Mercenaries, a minigame from the original game in which players must kill as many enemies as possible in a time limit, was released as a free DLC. On the same day, Capcom added microtransactions to allow players to pay extra to upgrade weapons faster.

On September 14, 2023, during a PlayStation State of Play presentation, Separate Ways, a side story from the original game featuring Ada Wong, Luis, and Albert Wesker was announced as paid DLC along with a title update for The Mercenaries. Both were released on September 21, 2023. Capcom featured Separate Ways during Tokyo Game Show 2023.

On December 8, 2023, Capcom released a VR mode as a free DLC.

== Reception ==
=== Critical reception ===
Reception

Aggregate scores
Aggregator	Score
Metacritic	(PC) 91/100 (PS5) 93/100 (XSXS) 91/100
OpenCritic	98%

Review scores
Publication	Score
Destructoid	7.5/10
Easy Allies	10/10
Edge	8/10
Famitsu	9/9/10/9 (Note: Each of the four reviewers in Famitsu scored the game on a ten point scale.)
Game Informer	9.5/10
GameRevolution	9/10
GameSpot	10/10
GamesRadar+	4.5/5
Giant Bomb	5/5
Hardcore Gamer	4.5/5
IGN	10/10
NME	5/5
PC Gamer (US)	80/100
PCGamesN	8/10
PCMag	5/5
Push Square	10/10
Shacknews	10/10
The Telegraph	5/5
The Guardian	5/5
Video Games Chronicle	5/5
VG247	5/5

Resident Evil 4 received "universal acclaim" from critics, according to review aggregator website Metacritic. The website states that it "modernizes the graphics, controls, and story while retaining much of what made the original a survival horror classic." 98% of 193 critic reviews recommend the game on OpenCritic. The director of the original Resident Evil 4, Shinji Mikami, said on Twitter that he had enjoyed the remake very much. He commended the remake team saying that they were able to take the "half-assed scenario" that he wrote in just two weeks, really fleshed it out, and improved upon it.

Several critics gave it a perfect score with focus on how Capcom improved the original Resident Evil 4; VG247 praised the improved gameplay mechanics from the original, mainly due to the new handling of weapons and the escort missions with Ashley. The Guardian also gave it a perfect score, addressing several improvements such as the camera and the handling of weapons the player can give Leon by interacting with the merchant. Among other improvements, Shacknews praised Capcom’s handling of the boss Krauser, noting that the remake replaces the original boss fight, which was defined by its heavy use of quick-time events, with a fully player-controlled knife battle that further develops the characters’ stories. The Daily Telegraph praised the redesign of the Regenerators enemies who come across as scarier creatures than in the original while balancing the original's pacing of fights with puzzles. PCMag enjoyed how Capcom not only improved the combat in both the original Resident Evil 4 and the remake, but also added more horror elements that would appeal to most gamers. GamesRadar+ said that the combat still had some problems and that most bosses were easy to defeat.

When it comes to the presentation, GamesRadar+ in general found the visuals to be impressive thanks to the RE Engine. VG247 praised the more mature narrative the remakes provided while toning down the action focus in favor of more classic horror scenes. They noted Capcom heavily improved the gameplay mechanics from the original, mainly due to the new handling of weapons and the escort missions with Ashley, Writing for IGN, Tristan Ogilvie praised the updates to the gameplay and story, writing that "at every step of the journey there are enhancements, both big and small". GameSpot's Kurt Indovina lauded the improved characterizations of Leon, Ashley, and the Merchant, writing that Leon now "acts like a human being". GameRevolution said that not only Ashley's characterization was improved due to being the weakest point from the original, but the remake's narrative allows to properly develop her bond with the protagonist. Game Informer claimed that while the narrative remains intact, Capcom made changes to the characters, the execution made all characters more likable with Ashley's redesign helping to reduce her original sexualization. Among other characters, Push Square enjoyed the designs of the Ganados who also feel creepier. Giant Bomb found Leon's characterization intact as he keeps making jokes when fighting while performing ridiculously overpowered techniques. Conversely, Destructoid's, Zoey Handley criticized the remake for not improving on some of the weaker aspects of the original, writing "it's just as atonal as it was originally" and that "the best section of the game is when you first enter the village, and it never reaches that height again".

==== Separate Ways ====
Separate Ways reception

Aggregate scores
Aggregator	Score
Metacritic	(PC) 89/100 (PS5) 88/100 (XSX) 89/100
OpenCritic	96%

Review scores
Publication	Score
4Players	92/100
Destructoid	8.5/10
IGN	9/10
Push Square	8/10
VideoGamer.com	8/10

The Separate Ways DLC received "generally favorable" reviews from critics, according to Metacritic. 96% of 57 critic reviews recommend the expansion on review aggregator website OpenCritic.

=== Sales ===
Resident Evil 4 sold more than 3 million copies in its first two days. It sold 4 million copies in the first two weeks, making it one of the fastest-selling Resident Evil games. By July 2023, it had sold over 5 million copies. By December, it had sold 6.48 million copies, making it the fastest-selling Resident Evil game, until being surpassed by Resident Evil Requiem in 2026. By March 2024, it had sold 7 million copies. By October, it had sold over 8 million copies. By December, it had sold over 9 million copies. In Japan, it was the best-selling retail game in its first week, selling 89,662 copies on PlayStation 5 and 85,371 on PlayStation 4. By April 2025, it had sold 10 million copies. It was the 13th best-selling video game in the US in 2023. It had sold 12.255 million copies by December 2025 and 13.6 million copies by March 2026. The game had sold over 16.8 million copies by September 2026, partially attributed to a 50% surge in sales for the PlayStation 5 version due to the upcoming release of the film Resident Evil coming out in said month.By October 2026, it had sold 17.15 million copies.

=== Accolades ===
Award	Date of ceremony	Category	Recipient(s) and nominee(s)	Result	Ref.
The Game Awards	December 8, 2022	Most Anticipated Game	Resident Evil 4	Nominated	
Japan Game Awards	September 21, 2023	Award for Excellence	Resident Evil 4	Won	
Golden Joystick Awards	November 10, 2023	Ultimate Game of the Year	Resident Evil 4	Nominated (Note: Voted #4 out of twenty nominees for Ultimate Game of the Year)	
Golden Joystick Awards	November 10, 2023	PlayStation Game of the Year	Resident Evil 4	Won	
The Game Awards	December 7, 2023	Game of the Year	Resident Evil 4	Nominated	
The Game Awards	December 7, 2023	Best Audio Design	Resident Evil 4	Nominated	
The Game Awards	December 7, 2023	Best Action/Adventure Game	Resident Evil 4	Nominated	
The Steam Awards	January 2, 2024	Game of the Year	Resident Evil 4	Nominated	
The Steam Awards	January 2, 2024	Outstanding Story-Rich Game	Resident Evil 4	Nominated	
New York Game Awards	January 23, 2024	Freedom Tower Award for Best Remake	Resident Evil 4	Won	
New York Game Awards	January 23, 2024	NYC GWB Award for Best DLC	Resident Evil 4: Separate Ways	Nominated	
