= Resident Evil: Retribution =

2012 film by Paul W. S. Anderson

- Theatrical release poster
- Directed by: Paul W. S. Anderson
- Written by: Paul W. S. Anderson
- Based on: Resident Evil by Capcom
- Produced by: Jeremy Bolt; Paul W. S. Anderson; Robert Kulzer; Don Carmody; Samuel Hadida
- Starring: Milla Jovovich; Michelle Rodriguez; Kevin Durand; Sienna Guillory; Shawn Roberts; Aryana Engineer; Colin Salmon; Johann Urb; Boris Kodjoe; Li Bingbing
- Cinematography: Glen MacPherson
- Edited by: Niven Howie
- Music by: Tomandandy
- Production companies: Constantin Film; Davis Films; Impact Pictures
- Distributed by: Sony Pictures Releasing/Screen Gems (Worldwide); Constantin Film Verleih (Germany); Metropolitan Filmexport (France)
- Release dates: September 3, 2012 (Tokyo); September 14, 2012 (United States); September 20, 2012 (Germany); September 26, 2012 (France)
- Running time: 96 minutes
- Countries: Germany; United States; Canada; France
- Language: English
- Budget: $65 million
- Box office: $240.2 million

Resident Evil: Retribution is a 2012 action horror film written and directed by Paul W. S. Anderson. A sequel to Resident Evil: Afterlife (2010), it is the fifth installment in the Resident Evil film series, loosely based on the video game franchise of the same name. It is also the third to be written and directed by Anderson after the first film and Afterlife. The film focuses on Alice (Milla Jovovich) captured by the Umbrella Corporation, forcing her to make her escape from an underwater facility in the Extreme North, used for testing the T-virus.

Written and directed by Anderson, Retribution was planned to be filmed back to back with the sixth installment, but Anderson decided to focus on the fifth film. Filming took place in Toronto, Ontario from mid-October to December 23, 2011. The film has many returning actors and characters, along with new characters from the video games not featured in the previous films, including Leon S. Kennedy, Ada Wong, and Barry Burton.

The film was released in 2D, 3D and IMAX 3D to box-office success, grossing over $240 million worldwide, but received generally negative reviews from critics, who criticized the characters, plot and acting, while praising the 3D, visual effects and fight choreography. The DVD and Blu-ray for the film was released on December 21, 2012, in the U.S. A sixth film, Resident Evil: The Final Chapter, was released in 2016.

== Plot ==
Alice and the survivors on board the Umbrella Corporation freighter Arcadia are attacked by a fleet of Umbrella gunships led by Alice's brainwashed former ally, Jill Valentine; Alice is captured during the attack. An Alice clone awakens in the suburbs, living with her husband, Todd, and their deaf daughter, Becky. Zombies attack, revealing the suburbia as Raccoon City during the initial outbreak. (Note: as depicted in Resident Evil: Apocalypse.) As Alice and Becky drive away from the undead with the help of Rain Ocampo, they are hit by a truck, knocking Rain unconscious. Alice hides Becky inside another house but is killed by a zombified Todd.

Meanwhile, the captured Alice awakens in an underwater facility and is interrogated by Jill. During a power failure, Alice escapes, rearms, and finds herself in a simulation of Shibuya Square, Tokyo. Fighting her way against zombies, she enters a control room filled with dead Umbrella employees and encounters Ada Wong, one of Albert Wesker's top agents.

Wesker appears on a screen, explaining that both no longer serve Umbrella, and the power outage was staged by him. The Red Queen, one of Alice's arch-enemies, was reactivated after the Hive was contaminated (Note: as depicted in Resident Evil.) and now controls Umbrella. The underwater facility, formerly a Soviet naval outpost in Kamchatka, Russia, was designed by Umbrella for manufacturing clones and creating simulated outbreaks to show the effect of the T-virus. Ada and Alice aim to rendezvous with a rescue crew organized by Wesker, which includes Leon S. Kennedy, Barry Burton, and Luther West. Leon's team plants explosives near the entrance of the facility, which will detonate in two hours to ensure its destruction. The group plans to meet with Alice and Ada in the Raccoon City suburbia area. In a New York simulation, Alice and Ada defeat two Executioners; Leon's team enters a Moscow simulation but is surrounded by an armed Las Plagas undead horde.

In the suburban simulation, Alice and Ada encounter Becky, who mistakes Alice for her clone mother and becomes attached to her. They also find Jill and the clones of Alice's deceased allies: James "One" Shade, Rain Ocampo, and Carlos Oliveira, who are sent to capture them. During a shootout, Ada stays behind so Alice and Becky can find their way out. The two encounter a "good" clone of Rain in the Moscow simulation. Alice gives her a weapon to help keep Becky safe. She then rescues Leon's surviving crew from the Las Plagas zombies and a giant Licker. The group reaches the submarine pens in the facility exit, but are ambushed by Jill's team.

During the ensuing fight, Becky is captured by the Licker, and "good" Rain is killed. Alice rescues Becky and kills the Licker. Barry sacrifices himself, holding the Umbrella operatives off long enough to ensure the others' escape. The explosives at the entrance go off: Leon and Luther escape flooding while Alice and Becky survive through the ventilation system.

On the surface, their snowmobile is knocked over by Jill's submarine. Jill and "evil" Rain confront the group, holding Ada as a hostage. During the fight, Alice tears the mind-controlling scarab off Jill's chest, returning her to normal. Meanwhile, Rain—now enhanced with superhuman strength and healing, thanks to the Las Plagas parasite—joins the fight, kills Luther, and knocks out Leon. Realizing she is too powerful to fight, Alice shoots the ice under Rain, who is dragged underwater by swimming zombies.

Alice, Jill, and the remaining survivors travel to Wesker's headquarters, a heavily fortified White House, staffed by the remainders of the U.S. military. Alice meets Wesker in the Oval Office, where he injects her with another strand of the T-virus, returning her superhuman abilities. On the roof, he explains that the Red Queen is trying to wipe out humanity; the remaining uninfected humans are in the base. The soldiers prepare to defend the White House against hordes of T-virus abominations.

== Cast ==
- Milla Jovovich as Alice, a former Umbrella security officer turned rogue fighter
- Sienna Guillory as Jill Valentine, a former S.T.A.R.S. member and police officer of Raccoon City
- Michelle Rodriguez as Rain Ocampo, a member of the original Umbrella strike team that was sent into the Hive
- Aryana Engineer as Becky, a child clone who plays the role of suburban Alice clone's deaf daughter
- Li Bingbing as Ada Wong, a former operative of Umbrella who was one of Wesker's top agents
  - An uncredited Sally Cahill dubbed over Li's voice in the film, reprising her role as the voice of Ada Wong from several Resident Evil games.
- Boris Kodjoe as Luther, one of Alice's former allies
- Robin Kasyanov as Sergei
- Johann Urb as Leon S. Kennedy, the leader of the rescue team sent by Wesker to help Alice escape from the Umbrella test facility
- Kevin Durand as Barry Burton, a member of the rescue team
- Oded Fehr as Todd / Carlos, a former U.B.C.S mercenary turned rogue fighter
- Ofilio Portillo as Tony
- Colin Salmon as One, the leader of the original Umbrella strike team sent into the Hive
- Shawn Roberts as Albert Wesker, former head of Umbrella Corporation
- Mika Nakashima as J-Pop Girl, a "Patient one" biohazard creature
- Megan Charpentier as the Red Queen, an on-and-off-again, renegade artificial intelligence who controls the Umbrella facility
  - Voiced by Ava Merson-O'Brian

== Production ==
=== Development ===
After the release of Resident Evil: Afterlife, director Paul W. S. Anderson was in discussion with Screen Gems of filming the fifth and sixth film back to back. But Anderson later decided to just focus on Resident Evil: Retribution. Anderson returned as writer and director, Glen McPherson serves as director of photography, Kevin Phipps as production designer and Nick Powell as both a fight choreographer and second-unit director.

=== Influences ===
When Ada and Alice encounter each other the first time, they recreate a scene from the game Resident Evil 4 in their brief fight. Another element they featured was Las Plagas parasite. Las Plagas plays a part in the film and allows the undead to "run around, ride motorbikes, and shoot machine guns." An action scene inspired by Resident Evil 5, where the characters are driving a Hummer while being chased by zombies, is featured, but for the film the Hummer was changed to a Rolls-Royce Phantom. The metal bug on Jill Valentine's chest can also be seen in Resident Evil 5.

Aside from the video games, writing for the film was heavily influenced by science-fiction films. "I think Inception had a huge impact on everyone," says Bolt, "and I think Westworld is an important film to Paul. Everybody knows, because he talks about it enough, the Alien series, Blade Runner, all these things are inspirations."

Makeup effects supervisor Paul Jones stated that he wanted the makeup on the zombies to look realistic. He took inspiration from Day of the Dead.

The film's fight sequences were influenced by Asian cinema. "We watched a lot of Thai movies this time around because of the movies (Powell) has done," says Anderson. "He did The Last Samurai as well. He has worked with a lot of Japanese stuntmen and he has worked with a lot of Hong Kong stuntmen. But we felt the area that hadn't been mined by western cinema much was that whole kind of high impact Thai style of fighting. So we just watched a lot of action sequences from a lot of Thai movies. There were moves and just a general feel that we thought we could infuse the movie with. You know, that kind of bone crunch where you really feel the impact. We tried to bring that into the movie, which is also good for 3D because obviously 3D makes it harder to sell those kind of fake phony punches because you see the distance between the fist and the face. So that kind of Thai style of fighting where you actually make contact is a lot stronger."

=== Casting ===
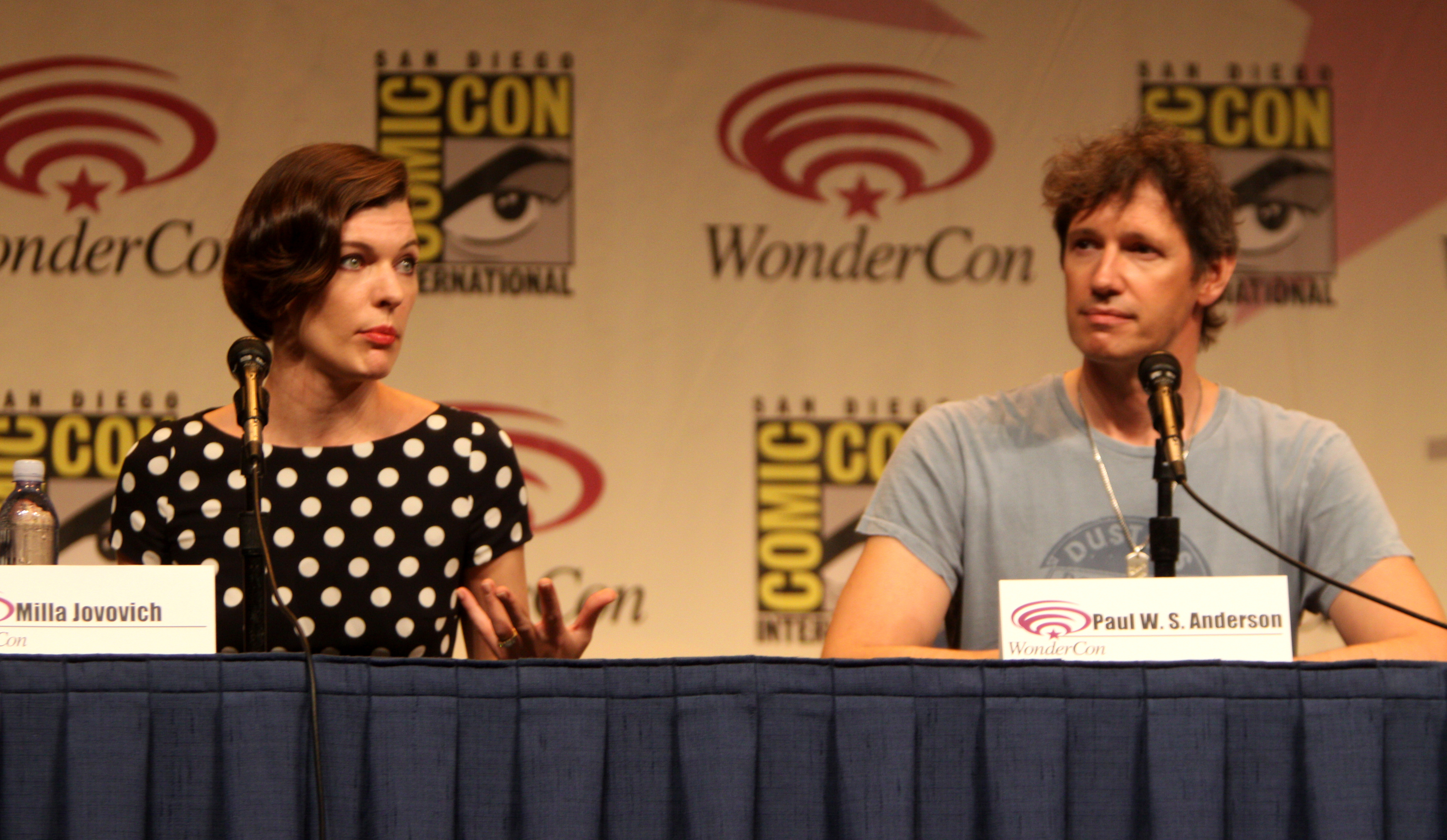
Jovovich with Paul W. S. Anderson at the 2012 WonderCon in promotion of Resident Evil: Retribution

Returning from the previous film are: Milla Jovovich as Alice, Sienna Guillory (Jill Valentine) and Boris Kodjoe (Luther West). Shawn Roberts (Albert Wesker) makes a cameo appearance. Colin Salmon who played James "One" Shade and Michelle Rodriguez who played Rain Ocampo in the first film return. Oded Fehr who portrayed Carlos Oliveira in the second and third film also returns. There are two "versions" of Rain and Carlos; one being portrayed as "evil" and one as "good". The characters Ada Wong (played by Li Bingbing), Leon S. Kennedy (Johann Urb) and Barry Burton (Kevin Durand) appear in the film. Ali Larter (Claire Redfield), Wentworth Miller (Chris Redfield) and Spencer Locke (K-Mart) do not return and they are presumed to have died in the attack on Arcadia or held captive elsewhere by Umbrella. Also, a new character portrayed by Aryana Engineer has been added to the franchise cast.

Anderson said that casting Leon was a challenge, due to his "extreme look": "Firstly, he's a major action hero. But also he has the floppy hair, and you have no idea how hard it is to find someone who looks like that. They're usually mutually exclusive. It's like the guys with floppy hair are all kind of doing British period movies, like Brideshead Revisited, and the guys who are top action heroes usually have buzz cuts. But I think after a long and very exhaustive search, we've finally found the right guy in Johann Urb."

=== Filming ===
Principal photography commenced on October 10 and wrapped on December 23, 2011, for a 55-day shoot. Filming locations included Toronto at Cinespace's Kipling studio facility, Times Square in New York City, Tokyo and Red Square in Moscow. Resident Evil: Retribution is the second film in the series to be shot in 3D, the first being Resident Evil: Afterlife. It was also filmed in 4K resolution. The Red Epic camera system was used, which producer Jeremy Bolt said is 50% smaller than the Sony F35 that was used for Resident Evil: Afterlife.

On October 11, a platform collapsed during the second day of filming and injured 16 people on the set. According to Toronto police, ten people were taken to the hospital for emergency treatment. Injuries included bruises and broken bones. Emergency workers had a difficult time determining which injuries were real, since the people were dressed in zombie costumes with fake blood.

The streets of Red Square were cleared for a day and background filming was done in the Russian subway after it was cleared for five hours (although the subway station scene is actually the Lower Bay abandoned station of Toronto subway). Most of the streets were built into sets. The car chase scene was filmed in late November in Moscow.

Durand and Roberts wrapped filming in the first week of December and Li wrapped on December 14. A fight scene between Jill and Alice that involved over 200 moves began filming December 14 until the end of production.

=== Music ===
The music group Tomandandy, who performed the Afterlife score, returned to score Resident Evil: Retribution. Anderson explained that the score for the film is a progression of Afterlife's, stating that he "wants to kind of mesh their more electronic stuff with an orchestra this time. It still has that cool Tomandandy feel, but it has a more epic scope to it." The official soundtrack was released on September 11, 2012, under Milan Records, which included Tomandandy's score for the film, as well as the film's end credits song "Hexes" produced by Bassnectar featuring Chino Moreno (of the Deftones) on vocals. Singer Mika Nakashima sings the theme song for the Japanese version of the film, "Ashita Sekai ga Owarunara."

No.	Title	Length
1.	"Hexes" (featuring Chino Moreno)	3:00
2.	"Flying Through the Air"	3:48
3.	"First Blood"	1:12
4.	"Tokyo Revisited"	2:05
5.	"Corridor"	2:52
6.	"Planting"	4:05
7.	"Axemen"	2:47
8.	"Fall Back"	1:51
9.	"Imprinted"	0:57
10.	"Suburbia"	2:50
11.	"Phantom Chase"	2:48
12.	"End of the World"	1:26
13.	"Drive Away"	1:10
14.	"Ice Pack"	2:04
15.	"Zombies Under Ice"	2:03
16.	"It's Help"	2:08
17.	"Flying Through the Air" (T-Mass Remix)	3:55
18.	"Origin" (bonus track)	2:59
19.	"The End" (bonus track)	1:24
Total length:		45:24

=== Marketing ===
The first teaser trailer of the film was attached to Underworld: Awakening, an installment from Resident Evil's rival film series, and released in January 2012, featuring product placement promoting Sony products such as the Xperia phone, the PlayStation Vita and the Tablet S, underscored by narration from Patrick Stewart, before transitioning into a post-apocalyptic Washington, D.C., with Alice standing on the roof of the White House, in similar fashion to the promotion for previous installments, Apocalypse and Extinction.

A viral website, UmbrellaCorporation.net, supposedly informed about Umbrella, reported that it was on a recruitment tour all over the world, with stops in Cancun, Mexico and San Diego, United States. While navigating the website, a video of Alice (Milla Jovovich) appeared, telling the viewer not to trust Umbrella. At the same time, an actual mobile tour for the film was launched, travelling to Cancún, Barcelona, Poznań, Warsaw and Rome. Furthermore, a black, tinted SUV with the Umbrella Corporation symbol and name on its doors and license plate was seen in Atlanta in June.

A second trailer premiered online on June 14, following a live Q&A with Milla Jovovich in New York City and was attached to prints of That's My Boy.

Milla Jovovich, Michelle Rodriguez, Oded Fehr, Boris Kodjoe, Mika Nakashima and Paul W. S. Anderson appeared at the 2012 San Diego Comic-Con on Friday, July 13. A discussion for the film took place, and never-before-seen footage debuted.

On August 10, 2012, a group of 27 people dressed as zombies "invaded" the Shibuya shopping district and handed out leaflets to promote the film. The group marched across the crossing in front of the Shibuya Station and then moved on to Shibuya's underground shopping area "Shibuchika" and to the "Shibuya Cine Palace".

== Release ==
Resident Evil: Retribution was released worldwide on September 14, 2012, in 3D, IMAX 3D and 2D. The MPAA's official rating for the film is R for "sequences of strong violence throughout". It was not screened in advance for critics.

The film's world premiere took place in Tokyo, Japan (where the film was retitled Biohazard V: Retribution) on September 3. Originally, a promotional stunt was planned that involved Jovovich pretending to come out with a gun and shoot "zombies" in the theater. In response to the Aurora shootings, Jovovich declined the stunt, commenting that "There's absolutely no way I'm doing anything violent in a movie theater." Jovovich, Anderson, and Nakashima appeared at the premiere for a red carpet event.

Li Bingbing did not appear at the premiere, raising speculation from reporters that her absence was a demonstration against the escalating dispute between China and Japan over the Senkaku Islands. Li's agent Ji Xiang explained that Li had been informed of the premiere two months before but she was too busy in Beijing to attend at that time. However, Ji did not deny that politics were involved, saying: "We are in line with our government – the Diaoyu Islands belong to China. Bingbing will be attending movie premieres held in other places across the world and she skipped the Tokyo leg only."

=== Home media ===
The film was released on December 21, 2012, on DVD, Blu-ray and Ultraviolet Digital Copy. It was released in the United Kingdom on DVD, Blu-ray and Ultraviolet Digital Copy on January 28, 2013. Pre-order for was available in November 2012 on Amazon.

== Reception ==
=== Box office ===
==== United States and Canada ====
Resident Evil: Retribution opened at #1 in 3,012 theaters, beating out the 3-D re-release of Finding Nemo. During its opening weekend, the film grossed $21,052,227 domestically (an average of $6,989 for each theater), which makes the film the second lowest domestic opening weekend in the series, with the lowest being the original Resident Evil ($17.7 million), though it sold the fewest tickets. The audience in the opening weekend was 64% male, and 55% were 25 years of age or older. Regular 3D showings accounted for 48% of ticket sales, while IMAX 3D contributed 14% and other large format showings contributed 4%. In its second weekend, the film dropped to fifth place behind newcomers End of Watch, Jennifer Lawrence's House at the End of the Street, and Trouble with the Curve with $6.7 million on the domestic charts. With a 68% decline from its previous weekend, this makes the worst domestic drop so far for a Resident Evil film. Its third weekend grossed $2.9 million, making a lighter 55% decrease and putting it into the number eight spot.

==== International territories ====
Resident Evil: Retribution broke the series record for the highest worldwide opening with $49.6 million, beating out Afterlife's opening of over $39 million. In its opening weekend, the film was strongest in Asia, where it had the best 2012 Hollywood debut so far in Japan ($11.2 million), Taiwan ($4.4 million) and Malaysia ($2 million). Its premiere in South Korea ($2 million) was underwhelming, where it underperformed to the local film Masquerade ($7.3 million). It performed well in Russia ($8.5 million) and Brazil ($3.1 million), but was disappointing in Australia ($1.5 million). The film retained the number one spot in its second weekend, grossing $30.5 million for a new foreign total of $103.8 million. Its top market was once again Japan, where it eased 27% to $6.3 million. Its new debuts included Germany ($3.6 million) and Mexico ($3.5 million). In its third weekend, the film dropped to the number two spot behind Looper, making $21.1 million. It had its premiere in France ($2 million), Italy ($1.4 million), and the United Kingdom ($1.3 million). The film broke $200 million in its fourth weekend, notably due to its opening in Spain ($1.4 million).

Worldwide, the film grossed $240 million, after the movie opened in China on 17 March. Although this does not match its predecessor's gross of $300 million, it still ranks as the second highest grossing in the series, the highest grossing foreign film in Japan in 2012 (7th overall), and the highest grossing Canadian film of 2012, and second of all time (behind Afterlife).

=== Critical response ===
Review aggregator Rotten Tomatoes gives the film a score of 28% based on reviews from 74 critics, with an average rating of 4.3/10. The site's critical consensus reads: "Resident Evil: Retribution offers everything one might reasonably expect from the fifth installment in a heavily action-dependent franchise – which means very little beyond stylishly hollow CGI-enhanced set pieces." On Metacritic, the film received a weighted average score of 39 out of 100 based on reviews from 17 critics, indicating "generally unfavorable reviews". CinemaScore polls reported that the average grade moviegoers gave the film was a "C+" on an A+ to F scale.

Jim Vejvoda at IGN gave the film a six out of ten, saying: "Even with all of its dopey dialogue, wooden characters and 'been there, done that' elements, Resident Evil: Retribution is pretty amazing as far as entries in this series go. It certainly feels more like a video game and has a bit more emotion to it than some of the past Resident Evil sequels, but if you don't like this series then there's not much here to make you suddenly warm up to it." Clark Collis from Entertainment Weekly also gave the film a mostly positive review, stating that "writer-director W.S. Anderson's overseeing of the Resident Evil zombie franchise has proven to be both lunatically haphazard and dementedly enthusiastic."

Rotten Tomatoes lists the film on its 100 Best Zombie Movies, Ranked by Tomatometer.

=== Accolades ===
Awards
Award	Category	Recipients	Result
Canadian Screen Awards	Best Costume Design	Wendy Partridge	Nominated
Canadian Screen Awards	Best Sound Editing	Stephen Barden, Steve Baine, Kevin Banks, Alex Bullick and Jill Purdy	Nominated
Canadian Screen Awards	Best Visual Effects	Dennis Berardi, Jason Edwardh, Matt Glover, Trey Harrell, Leann Harvey, Jo Hughes, Ethan Lee, Scott Riopelle, Eric Robinson and Kyle Yoneda	Won
Canadian Screen Awards	Golden Reel Award	Resident Evil: Retribution	Won
Golden Raspberry Awards	Worst Actress	Milla Jovovich	Nominated

== Sequel ==
When Retribution outgrossed Afterlife Sony distribution's head, Rory Bruer, confirmed that there would be a sixth film. In an interview with Forbes, producer Samuel Hadida stated that a sixth and seventh installment were planned and a reboot of the series was possible.

On June 16, 2014, Anderson said he was in the process of writing the final film, tentatively titled Resident Evil: The Final Chapter and stated that no dates had been set for the start of production or its release in theaters. On September 18, 2015, filming in South Africa began, with Roberts reprising his role as Wesker and Iain Glen reprising his role as Dr. Alexander Isaacs. Joining the cast were Ruby Rose as Abigail, Eoin Macken as Doc, William Levy as Christian, Fraser James as Michael and Rola as Cobalt. The film was released on January 27, 2017.

== See also ==
- List of films based on video games
