= Ada Wong =

Resident Evil character

- Ada Wong in Resident Evil 4 (2005)
- First appearance: Resident Evil 2 (1998)
- Created by: Hideki Kamiya; Noboru Sugimura; Kazunori Kadoi
- Designed by: Isao Ohishi; Ryoji Shimogama
- Voiced by: English: Sally Cahill (Resident Evil 2 and 4, The Darkside Chronicles, Retribution) Megan Hollingshead (The Umbrella Chronicles) Courtenay Taylor (Operation Raccoon City, Resident Evil 6, Damnation, Teppen) Shannon Chan-Kent (Puzzle Fighter) Jolene Andersen (Resident Evil 2 remake) Vicky Psarakis (Dead by Daylight) Lily Gao (Resident Evil 4 remake, Goddess of Victory: Nikke); Japanese: Yūko Mizutani (Resident Evil 2 drama cd) Junko Minagawa (Operation Raccoon City, Resident Evil 6, Project X Zone 2, Damnation, Teppen, Goddess of Victory: Nikke, remakes of Resident Evil 2 and 4)
- Motion capture: Various: Michelle Lee (Resident Evil 6) Jolene Andersen (Resident Evil: Damnation, Resident Evil 2 remake) Lily Gao (Resident Evil 4 remake)
- Portrayed by: Li Bingbing (Retribution); Lily Gao (Welcome to Raccoon City)

In-universe information
- Nationality: Chinese-American

Ada Wong (Note: Japanese: エイダ・ウォン, Hepburn: Eida Won) is a character in Resident Evil (Biohazard in Japan), a survival horror video game series created by the Japanese company Capcom. Ada was first mentioned in the original Resident Evil (1996), before being introduced as a supporting character and antiheroine in Resident Evil 2 (1998). The character was initially conceived as a researcher named Linda for the prototype of the second game, but her name was changed to Ada and she was rewritten as a spy and mercenary for the final build to connect its story to that of the original. Over the course of the series, Ada is often hired to steal biological weapons for various organizations, although she betrays her employers on numerous occasions to save protagonist Leon S. Kennedy from dire situations.

Ada is featured in several Resident Evil games, novelizations, and films, and has also appeared in other game franchises such as Project X Zone, Teppen, and Dead by Daylight. Several actresses have portrayed the character. Sally Cahill, Courtenay Taylor, Jolene Andersen, and Lily Gao, among others, have provided Ada's voice for her video game and animated appearances, while Li Bingbing and Gao have played her in the live-action Resident Evil films.

Critics have positively responded to Ada as a character, highlighting her intelligence and resourcefulness as her key personality traits. Several journalists have praised Ada's portrayal as a femme fatale, and cited her as an example of a female character who is as competent and skilled as her male counterparts. However, due to Ada's Asian ethnicity, concerns that the character perpetuates the Orientalist trope of the "Dragon Lady" have also been raised. Ada's outfits—particularly her red dress from Resident Evil 4 (2005)—have been brought up in discussions pertaining to the male gaze and criticized for being overtly sexualized. Gao's performance as Ada in the 2023 remake of Resident Evil 4 received unfavorable reviews.

== Appearances ==
=== In the Resident Evil series ===
Ada Wong is the pseudonym of a Chinese-American spy and mercenary who recurs as an antiheroine in Capcom's survival horror video game series Resident Evil. Her real name and background before working in espionage remain unknown. Introduced as a supporting character in Resident Evil 2 (1998), Ada is hired by an unnamed organization to steal the G-virus mutagen developed by the Umbrella Corporation, a pharmaceutical company responsible for a zombie outbreak in the fictional American metropolitan area of Raccoon City. Ada meets and allies with rookie police officer Leon S. Kennedy to access Umbrella's underground biological warfare laboratory, where she is outed as a mercenary by scientist Annette Birkin. Despite being severely wounded, Ada helps Leon destroy the T-103 Tyrant and escapes from Raccoon City before its destruction by a nuclear strike as part of a U.S. government cover-up.

Ada returns in Resident Evil 4 (2005). She is sent to a rural Spanish village by Albert Wesker to retrieve a sample of the mind-controlling "Las Plagas" parasite from the Los Iluminados cult. During her mission, Ada encounters Leon as he attempts to rescue the U.S. president's daughter, Ashley Graham, who has been abducted by the cult. After helping Leon kill the cult's leader, Osmund Saddler, Ada steals the sample from Leon and makes her escape in a helicopter. Later ports of Resident Evil 4, beginning with the PlayStation 2 version, include a new scenario featuring Ada as the playable character. Entitled "Separate Ways", it depicts the events of the main game from her perspective and highlights her relationship with Leon.

In Resident Evil 6 (2012), Ada investigates National Security Advisor Derek C. Simmons, a former associate who is obsessed with her, and discovers that Simmons has transformed his assistant Carla Radames into her doppelgänger. Ada kills Carla, helps Leon defeat Simmons, and destroys the lab where her clone was created before accepting a new assignment.

=== Other appearances ===
Ada features in several Resident Evil films. She appears in the adult animated film Resident Evil: Damnation (2012), in which she poses as a Bioterrorism Security Assessment Alliance agent to infiltrate the Eastern Slav Republic and obtain a sample of the "Las Plagas" parasite used in the country's civil war. Ada made her live-action debut in Resident Evil: Retribution (2012), the fifth installment in director Paul W. S. Anderson's Resident Evil film series, as a former agent of Umbrella who teams up with Alice, an original character created specifically for the films, to escape from an underwater Umbrella facility. Ada also appears in the mid-credits scene of the live-action reboot film Resident Evil: Welcome to Raccoon City (2021). She was originally intended to have a larger role, but director Johannes Roberts believed that there were too many characters in the film.

Ada is a playable character in several non-canonical Resident Evil games. She features in the on-rails light-gun shooter game Resident Evil: The Darkside Chronicles (2009), the "Heroes Mode" of the third-person shooter game Resident Evil: Operation Raccoon City (2012), and the online multiplayer game Resident Evil Re:Verse (2022). She is a playable character in the asymmetric multiplayer game Dead by Daylight (2016), the competitive puzzle game Puzzle Fighter (2017), the digital collectible card game Teppen (2019), Arena Breakout (2019), and the mobile games Puzzles & Survival and State of Survival (both 2023). She is an alternate skin in the fighting game Street Fighter V (2016), adventure game Knives Out (2017), and Wuthering Waves (2024). She has a non-playable cameo in the browser-based hack and slash game Onimusha Soul (2013), tactical role-playing game Project X Zone 2 (2015), PUBG Mobile (2018), and has been announced as an additional character in Goddess of Victory: Nikke (2022).

Ada features in novelizations of the films and games. Capcom screenwriters created a series of Resident Evil 2 radio dramas, including one titled Ikiteita Onna Spy Ada (The Female Spy Ada Lives). The dramas were broadcast on Radio Osaka in 1999, with Suleputer later releasing the collection on two CDs as Biohazard 2 Drama Album. Set after the events of Resident Evil 2, they follow Ada's mission to retrieve Sherry Birkin's pendant with the G-virus sample from Umbrella enforcer HUNK. Comic books based on the game series have also been released, and Ada appears in Resident Evil: The Official Comic Magazine. She features in Bandai's Resident Evil Deck Building Card Game (2011) and Steamforged Games' Resident Evil 2: The Board Game (2017). Other merchandise featuring Ada include action figures, figurines, statues, plushies, and t-shirts.

== Concept and design ==
Initial concept designs for Ada for an early prototype of Resident Evil 2, which depicted her as an Umbrella researcher (left) before she was reinterpreted as a spy (right)

Ada was initially conceived as Linda, an Umbrella researcher tasked with retrieving the G-virus, for an early prototype of Resident Evil 2. The name "Ada" was conceived by Capcom designer Kazunori Kadoi and first mentioned in the original Resident Evil (1996). After the prototype was discarded and development for Resident Evil 2 was restarted, director Hideki Kamiya decided to turn Ada into a full character and invited Kadoi for a meeting, during which Kadoi said that he proposed Ada's name randomly and without much thought. Writer Noboru Sugimura gave Linda's role from the discarded prototype to Ada and reinterpreted her as an enigmatic corporate spy for the final build of Resident Evil 2 to connect its story to that of the first game. Artists Isao Ohishi and Ryoji Shimogama designed Ada's appearance.

In Resident Evil 2, Ada develops an ambiguous romance with Leon as they save each other's lives throughout the game. In the 2019 remake of Resident Evil 2, more time was spent developing Ada and Leon's relationship, as the creative team felt that it had progressed too quickly in the original game. Executive producer Jun Takeuchi suggested that the kiss between Ada and Leon occur earlier in the remake, which Kamiya believed "makes Ada feel more manipulative of Leon". Ada's red dress from the original version of the game is initially covered by a beige trench coat in the remake, which Kadoi said was a more "realistic" and "believable" look for a spy.

Ada and Leon's relationship is further explored in Resident Evil 4 and its "Separate Ways" minigame. As development of the PlayStation 2 release of the main game took longer than expected, it was decided that instead of simply porting the game from the GameCube, additional material would be added. Producer Masachika Kawata believed that Ada deserved "to really stand out" beyond her minimal screen time in the main campaign of Resident Evil 4, and developed "Separate Ways" as a means of further exploring the character. For the title screen of "Separate Ways", Ada strikes a pose inspired by the poster of the 1990 film La Femme Nikita. In the 2023 remake of Resident Evil 4, Ada's red side-split dress and choker from the original version of the game are replaced by a red woolly jumper and leather harness.

Ada can be unlocked as a playable character in Resident Evil 6 after completing the game's three main campaigns. Executive producer Hiroyuki Kobayashi believed this enhanced Ada's ambiguity and made her scenario "more enjoyable" because "one of the themes of Ada's story is a lone spy working in secret". Ada's outfit, which was designed by Yōsuke Yamagata and included a red blouse and black leather pants, was inspired by a previously rejected design for the character for Resident Evil 4.

Ada was intended to appear in Resident Evil Village (2021) as a mysterious masked figure in a plague doctor outfit who helps protagonist Ethan Winters, but she was ultimately cut from the game due to "conflicting scenarios". In Resident Evil Requiem (2026), director Koshi Nakanishi stated that Ada did not appear since "there weren't really many opportunities for her to appear, or rather, there weren't any scenes where it was necessary." Producer Masato Kumazawa also mentioned that they wanted to add a character, but they were satisfied with Leon and Federal Bureau of Investigation (FBI) agent Grace Ashcroft's story already.

=== Voice-over and live-action actresses ===
Sally Cahill voiced Ada for her initial appearance in Resident Evil 2, and reprised the role in Resident Evil 4 and Resident Evil: The Darkside Chronicles. Ada has also been voiced by Megan Hollingshead in Resident Evil: The Umbrella Chronicles, and Courtenay Taylor in Resident Evil: Operation Raccoon City, Resident Evil 6, and Resident Evil: Damnation.

Michelle Lee provided the motion capture performance for Ada in Resident Evil 6, while Jolene Andersen provided the voice and motion capture for Ada in the 2019 remake of Resident Evil 2. Lily Gao, who portrayed Ada in the live-action film Resident Evil: Welcome to Raccoon City, provided the character's voice and motion capture in the 2023 remake of Resident Evil 4. Chinese actress Li Bingbing played Ada in the live-action film Resident Evil: Retribution, and was dubbed by Cahill in English and Junko Minagawa in Japanese. Li took part in promoting the movie locally for their various audiences, as well as attending premiere screenings and conducting interviews for media coverage.

== Critical reception ==
Ada has received positive reviews from critics for her personality traits and defying gender conventions. Journalists from The Guardian and Larry Hester of Complex have praised her beauty, intelligence, and her tendency to be "numerous steps ahead of everyone else". Academic writer Jenny Platz opined that Ada fulfills gender fluidity as she possessed traits typically associated with males, such as "strength and intelligence", as well as female traits like "beauty and poise". Other critics have praised Ada as a femme fatale, such as The Escapist's Lara Crigger, who described her a "strong feminist role model". Scholar Andrei Nae noted that Resident Evil 4 is heavily influenced by film noir, a genre in which female characters are either "submissive" – such as Ashley Graham – or femmes fatales that challenge male authority and patriarchal conventions. According to Nae, in contrast to most examples of femmes fatales in film noir that eventually cease challenging male authority and submit to the male hero of the story—in the case of Resident Evil 4, Leon—Ada manages to remain out of the "ambit of the male protagonist's authority". In doing so, Ada challenges both gender and genre conventions of noir fiction.

Ada's characterization has received some criticism, owing to her status as an Asian woman. Praising her as challenging of noir conventions and independence, Nae felt that Ada's identity as a Chinese-American makes her accentuated sexuality as a femme fatale conform to Orientalist clichés of East-Asian erotic femininity. Similarly, although Polygon's Harri Chan praised Ada for complimenting the "schlocky action-movie energy" of Resident Evil 4, she criticized the character's portrayal for adhering to the stereotypical "Dragon Lady" trope and not providing Ada with any other path for character growth.

Ada's sexualization has repeatedly been brought into broader analyses of the character in video games. Critics have argued that the in-game cinematics in Resident Evil 4 focused on Ada's slit dress – noted as unrealistic and unsuitable for a combat role – and body, holding that her appearance was intended to appeal to male audiences. In Tropes vs. Women in Video Games, feminist media critic Anita Sarkeesian criticized Ada's outfit, particularly her use of high heels in combat roles, and argued that the attire was designed to attract men. Conversely, digital media scholar Esther MacCallum-Stewart stated that Resident Evil's female characters possess unique qualities that make them viable choices for players to select over their male counterparts, with alternate combat attire that helps avoid pandering to the male gaze. Researcher Stephanie Jennings argued in Feminism In Play that Ada's sexualization is reframed to enhance meaning in play, with her chapter in Resident Evil 6 offering a "transgressive gender performance that effectively critiques and condemns traditional patriarchal power structures". She suggested that Ada's presence as one of the series' few multiracial characters demonstrates the intersectional potential of the feminine gaze, albeit undermined by the limited exploration of the character's racial identity.

Lily Gao's vocal performance as Ada in the 2023 remake of Resident Evil 4 was criticized by fans, resulting in the game being review bombed. Jade King of TheGamer criticized the vocal performance of Ada and considered her to be the worst part of the game. Michael McWhertor of Polygon criticized the dialogue as unnatural, speculating whether Gao was given improper direction in an attempt to generate a "cool" personality that set Ada apart from Leon. Gao deactivated her Instagram comments and hid most of her posts after she was harassed online, later responding to critics with: "My Ada is a survivor. She is unpredictable, resilient, and absolutely not a stereotype."
