= Leon S. Kennedy =

Character in Resident Evil

Leon Scott Kennedy
- Leon S. Kennedy in Resident Evil 4 (2005)
- First appearance: Resident Evil 2 (1998)
- Created by: Hideki Kamiya; Noboru Sugimura
- Designed by: Isao Ohishi; Ryoji Shimogama
- Portrayed by: Various: Johann Urb (Retribution) Eduard Badaluta (Resident Evil 2 and 4 remake) Avan Jogia (Welcome to Raccoon City)
- Voiced by: Various: English Paul Haddad (Resident Evil 2) Paul Mercier (Resident Evil 4, Degeneration, The Darkside Chronicles) Christian Lanz (Operation Raccoon City) Matthew Mercer (Resident Evil 6, Damnation, Revelations 2, Vendetta, Death Island) Nick Apostolides (Resident Evil 2 and 4 remake, Infinite Darkness, Requiem) John Patneaude (State of Survival) Japanese Toshiyuki Morikawa (Operation Raccoon City, Resident Evil 6, Damnation, Revelations 2, Project X Zone 2, remakes of Resident Evil 2 and 4, Infinite Darkness, Death Island) Yuki Kaji (Welcome to Raccoon City)
- Motion capture: Various: Teruaki Ogawa (Resident Evil 4); Jason Faunt (Resident Evil 6); Nick Apostolides (Resident Evil 2 and 4 remake, Infinite Darkness, Requiem)

In-universe information
- Nationality: American

Leon Scott Kennedy (Note: Japanese: レオン・スコット・ケネディ, Hepburn: Reon Sukotto Kenedi) is a character in Resident Evil (Biohazard in Japan), a survival horror video game series created by the Japanese company Capcom. Leon was introduced alongside Claire Redfield as one of the two player characters in Resident Evil 2 (1998). The character was initially conceived as a veteran police officer in the game's prototype, but writer Noboru Sugimura rewrote Leon as a young, newly recruited officer. In Resident Evil 2, Leon arrives late for his first day at work in the doomed Raccoon City and faces a zombie outbreak.

Leon is the protagonist of several Resident Evil games, novelizations, and films, and has appeared in other game franchises, such as Project X Zone and Dead by Daylight. He also appears in computer-generated imagery (CGI)-animated films and an animated miniseries. Several actors have portrayed Leon; Paul Haddad, Paul Mercier, Matthew Mercer, Nick Apostolides, and Toshiyuki Morikawa have voiced him in video games and animations, while Johann Urb and Avan Jogia have played him in the live-action Resident Evil films.

Video-game publications have described Leon as one of the most-popular and iconic video-game characters, with critics lauding his personality in Resident Evil 4 (2005). Starting with the Resident Evil 2 (2019) remake, Leon's characterization has also been praised for enhancing his sex appeal.

== Concept and design ==
Leon Scott Kennedy, an American of Italian descent, was introduced as one of two playable protagonists in Capcom's 1998 survival horror video game Resident Evil 2. Although Hideki Kamiya, the game's creative director, preferred "blunt, tough-guy type[s]", he created Leon as "someone with weaknesses" to differentiate him from Chris Redfield and a departure from the first game's approach. Kamiya stated Leon is named after the film Léon: The Professional (1994). In the first prototype of Resident Evil 2 (often called Resident Evil 1.5), Leon is depicted as a veteran Raccoon City police officer. Noboru Sugimura, who was hired to rewrite the story, reworked Leon as a young, newly recruited officer; he believed the existing version of the character lacked depth and coherence. According to the game's manual, Leon arrives late to his first day of work due to a fight with his girlfriend, a detail Kamiya said was inspired by his own experience. The artists Isao Ohishi and Ryoji Shimogama designed Leon's final in-game appearance.

In the 2019 remake of Resident Evil 2, Leon was redesigned to better match the game's more-photorealistic setting. For example, his large shoulder pads, which were originally used to emphasize his low‑polygon model, were removed. During the original Resident Evil 2, Leon develops an ambiguous romance with the mercenary and spy Ada Wong, and they repeatedly save each other's lives. For the remake, the creative team, who felt the relationship in the 1998 original game progresses too quickly, decided to spend more time on the two characters' interactions. Executive producer Jun Takeuchi suggested their kiss should occur earlier in the story to make Ada seem more manipulative of Leon.

Writer Yasuhisa Kawamura enhanced the atmosphere of Resident Evil 4 (2005) through multiple revisions. Kawamura told Brenna Hillier of VG247 that in the original concept, Leon would infiltrate the castle of Oswell E. Spencer, the founder of Umbrella Corporation, and discover a girl in the castle's laboratory. Together with a bioweapon dog, the trio would explore the castle. This approach was deemed too costly and was scrapped. Leon's popularity surprised Hideki Kamiya, who enjoyed the character's evolution into a "really cool looking guy" for Resident Evil 4, saying he "fell in love all over again". According to a documentary about the game's characters, Leon was intended to "look tougher, but also cool". Designer Masaki Yamanaka said the change was due to the experience Leon had gained since Resident Evil 2; although Leon kept his "coolness", Yamanaka did not want him to be "too buffed out". In the remake of Resident Evil 4 (2023), producer Yoshiaki Hirabayashi said they made adjustments that felt natural to players, and retained the originals' horror elements and Leon's sarcastic charm. The developers, wanting to show more about the game's human relationships than the original game, put an increased emphasis on character interactions.

Resident Evil 5's (2009) producer Takeuchi said due to the characters' popularity, fans of the series wanted both Leon and Chris as protagonists. He said it would be "pretty dramatic" if Leon and Chris never met during the series; they eventually meet in Resident Evil 6 (2012). Resident Evil 6's producer Hiroyuki Kobayashi liked Leon and decided to include him because "he is central to the story of the game". Leon's blue, Chinese-style outfit is intended to look stylish and to contrast with Chris's military equipment.

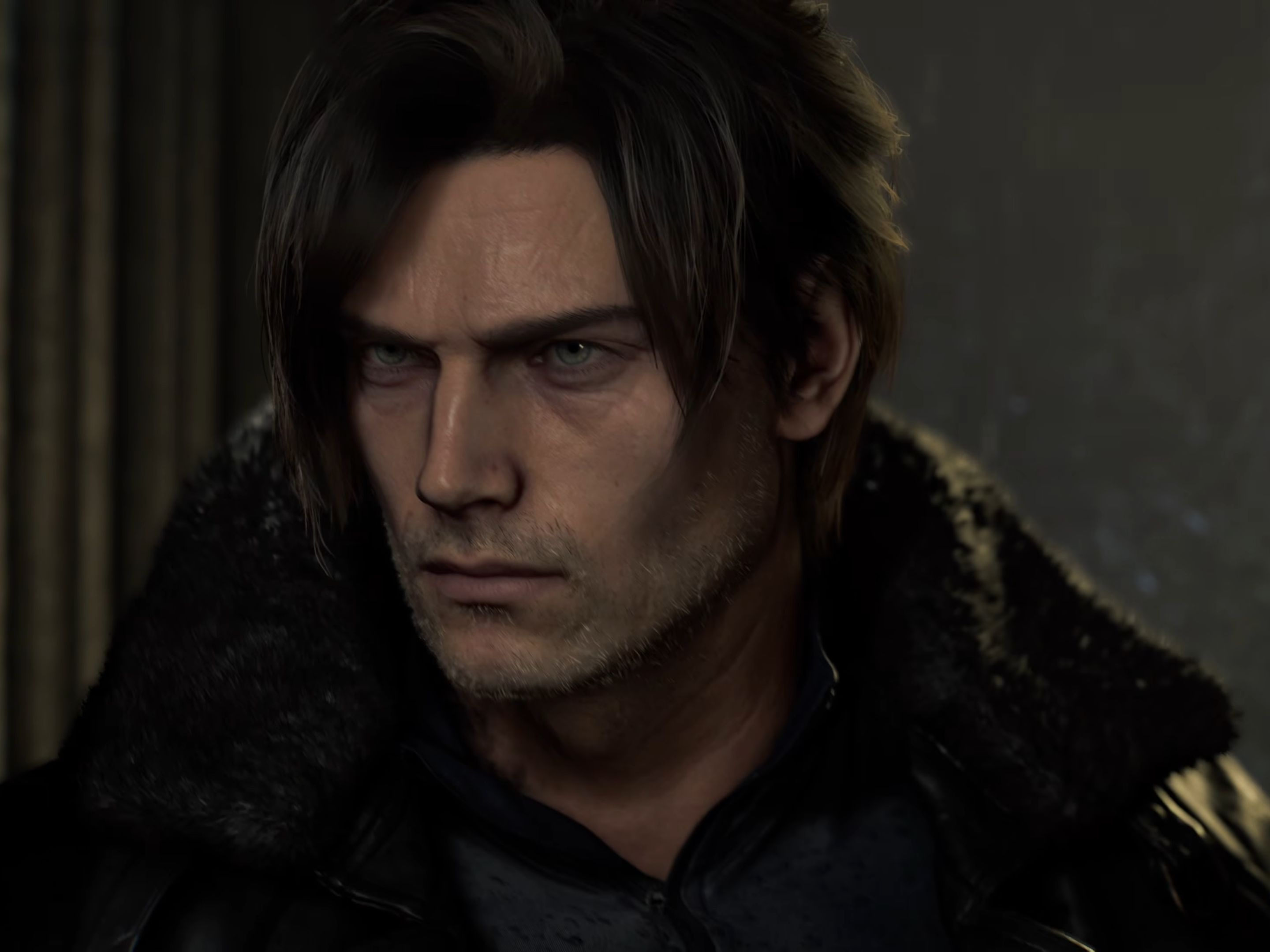
Resident Evil Requiem features an older, more mature version of Leon, who Nakanishi described as a "seasoned veteran".

For Resident Evil Requiem (2026), Leon was designed as a stylish, attractive, mature man. According to director Koshi Nakanishi, the developers considered making Leon the sole protagonist of Requiem but rejected this idea because "making a horror game based around him [would be] difficult", given Leon's vast experience with monsters in previous games. Nakanishi said fans of the franchise would be opposed to Leon being depicted as constantly afraid of his surroundings. The dual-protagonist structure of Requiem, in which players alternate between Leon and Federal Bureau of Investigation (FBI) agent Grace Ashcroft, was conceived to ensure the game would include slow-paced, horror-focused sections alongside fast-paced action sequences; this allowed the developers to show the differences in experience between Leon and Grace. According to Nakanishi, Leon's sequences could give players a sense of release following Grace's chapters. He said that when designing Leon and his gameplay, they wanted Requiem to highlight his physical and mental state, and the ways his experience in dealing with horrific creatures has influenced them. Nakanishi also stated Leon's wedding band is shown at the end of Requiem to demonstrate the character has a "place to go home to" where he hoped players could imagine him spending peaceful moments. Capcom intends to continue using Leon in the future, even at the age of 70.

=== Voice-over and live-action actors ===
Several actors have portrayed Leon S. Kennedy in the Resident Evil video game series, and in movies based on the property. Paul Haddad voiced Leon for his debut in Resident Evil 2. Leon was voiced by Paul Mercier in Resident Evil 4; Resident Evil: Degeneration and Resident Evil: The Darkside Chronicles. Christian Lanz played the character in Resident Evil: Operation Raccoon City; and Matthew Mercer did so in Resident Evil 6, Resident Evil: Damnation, Resident Evil: Revelations 2, Resident Evil: Vendetta and Resident Evil: Death Island.

Jason Faunt performed Leon's motion capture in Resident Evil 6, while Nick Apostolides performed the voice and motion capture in Resident Evil 2 (2019), Resident Evil 4 (2023), and Resident Evil Requiem, as well as the animated film Resident Evil: Infinite Darkness. Leon's facial features in Resident Evil 2 (2019), Resident Evil 4 (2023) and Resident Evil Requiem are based on those of the Romanian model Eduard Badaluta. In Japanese, Toshiyuki Morikawa voiced Leon in Resident Evil: Infinite Darkness, Damnation, Resident Evil 6, Project X Zone 2, Resident Evil 2 (2019), and Resident Evil 4 (2023).

In live-action films, Leon is portrayed by Johann Urb in Resident Evil: Retribution, and by Avan Jogia in Resident Evil: Welcome to Raccoon City.

== Appearances ==
=== In the Resident Evil series ===
Resident Evil games featuring Leon Kennedy
1998	Resident Evil 2
1999–2000
2001	Resident Evil Gaiden
2002–2004
2005	Resident Evil 4
2006–2008
2009	Resident Evil: The Darkside Chronicles
2010–2011
2012	Resident Evil: Operation Raccoon City
2012	Resident Evil 6
2013–2018
2019	Resident Evil 2 (remake)
2020–2021
2022	Resident Evil Re:Verse
2023	Resident Evil 4 (remake)
2024–2025
2026	Resident Evil Requiem

Resident Evil 2 takes place in 1998 in the fictional American location Raccoon City. Leon Scott Kennedy is a rookie police officer who arrives in the city shortly after the beginning of a zombie outbreak, for which the pharmaceutical company Umbrella Corporation is responsible. Leon meets Claire Redfield and they flee toward the Raccoon City Police Department building, but are overrun by zombies and become separated. As he explores the building, Leon meets Ada Wong, an FBI agent who wants to obtain a sample of the G-virus mutagen. While searching for the virus, Leon and Ada find an underground laboratory, where they meet Umbrella scientist Annette Birkin, who reveals Ada is a mercenary. Ada claims the G-virus but Birkin shoots her in the ensuing struggle, and Ada seemingly falls to her death. The facility is then primed to self-destruct; Leon escapes but encounters T-103 Tyrant. During the confrontation, Ada, who survives the fall, tosses Leon a rocket launcher and destroys T-103 Tyrant. Leon rejoins Claire, who has secured a train that leads to the surface and they, along with Birkin's young daughter Sherry Birkin, escape before a nuclear strike destroys Raccoon City as part of a U.S. government cover-up.

Leon returns in Resident Evil 4 (2005), set in 2004. Now a special agent, he is tasked with rescuing the U.S. president's daughter Ashley Graham, who has been abducted in Spain. Upon his arrival, Leon discovers Ashley's abductors are a mysterious cult known as Los Illuminados, which has taken control of villagers using parasites known as "Las Plagas". During the rescue mission, Leon runs into Ada, whom he has not seen since Raccoon City, and Jack Krauser, his former special-operations partner whom he believed was dead. At the game's climax, Leon kills the cult's leader, Osmund Saddler, but is forced to give Ada a sample of the parasite. Ada escapes in a helicopter, leaving Leon and Ashley to escape on a jet ski.

Leon's history with Krauser is explored in Resident Evil: The Darkside Chronicles (2009). Two years before the events of Resident Evil 4, Leon and Krauser undertake "Operation Javier", a mission to a South American rainforest to apprehend the drug lord Javier Hidalgo, who is working with Umbrella. Leon and Krauser locate and kill Javier but during the operation, Krauser grows jealous and resentful of Leon's professional success.

Leon is a protagonist in Resident Evil 6 (2012) alongside Chris, Jake Muller, and Ada. In 2013, the President of the United States is preparing to publicly announce the events in Raccoon City. Before Leon can begin speaking, the President is attacked by a bioweapon that turns him into a zombie, forcing Leon to kill him, and Leon is accused of orchestrating the attack and the assassination. Ada reveals the true culprit is National Security Advisor Derek C. Simmons, the creator of "C-virus". Seeking to clear his own name, Leon joins forces with Secret Service agent Helena Harper and, together with Ada, they pursue Simmons to China, where they defeat him.

Leon returns in Resident Evil Requiem (2026), which is set in 2026. Leon and Sherry are agents of the Division of Security Operations (DSO), an elite U.S. federal counter-bioterrorism agency, who investigate deaths connected to a new, unidentified bioweapon. Leon is sent to investigate the disappearance of a police officer at the Wrenwood Hotel. It is revealed that some survivors of the Raccoon City event became sick as a result of prolonged exposure to the T-virus, another type of progenitor virus, and Leon appears to have contracted the disease. He grows suspicious of, and follows, the antagonist Victor Gideon, a researcher with connections to Umbrella, to the Rhodes Hill Chronic Care Center. Leon encounters Grace, who has just woken up in a different area of the clinic after being kidnapped while investigating the Wrenwood Hotel. Leon and Grace discover a chamber with "Elpis" samples when they infiltrate ARK, a research facility owned by Umbrella, located beneath Raccoon City. Grace decides to release Elpis, which is revealed to be an antidote to all viral-based bioweapons Spencer has created, and uses it to cure Leon before he kills Gideon. The Hound Wolf Squad of the United Nations' Bioterrorism Security Assessment Alliance (BSAA) rescue Leon and Grace, and a soldier passes Leon a message from their captain, Chris.

=== Other appearances ===
Leon S. Kennedy appears in several of the Resident Evil live-action films. Leon is a major character in Paul W. S. Anderson's Resident Evil: Retribution (2012), in which he leads the Resistance and teams up with Alice to battle Umbrella. Anderson said he felt a lot of pressure to find an actor who was a convincing action hero and had a similar hairstyle. Leon does not appear in the final film in the series, Resident Evil: The Final Chapter (2016), having apparently died off-screen. Leon also appears in the live-action reboot film Resident Evil: Welcome to Raccoon City (2021).

In the animated Resident Evil films, Leon plays a major role in Resident Evil: Degeneration (2008), in which he is reunited with Claire. He returns in the sequel, Resident Evil: Damnation (2012). A third animated film, Resident Evil: Vendetta (2017), features Chris, Leon, and Rebecca Chambers. Leon also appears with Claire in the Netflix series Resident Evil: Infinite Darkness (2021); he is ordered to investigate an incident in the White House, where he encounters and kills zombies. He returns in the sequel, Resident Evil: Death Island (2023).

Leon is a playable character in several non-canonical Resident Evil games. He is one of two protagonists in Resident Evil Gaiden (2001) and appears in several Resident Evil mobile games. In Gaiden, Leon is ordered to investigate a cruise ship that is rumored to host Umbrella's latest experiments; he soon disappears and Barry Burton is sent to rescue him. He appears as a playable character in other games including Project X Zone 2 (2016), Dead by Daylight (2016), Teppen (2019), Arena Breakout (2019), Puzzles & Survival (2023), and State of Survival (2023). Leon is an alternate skin for characters in games such as Rainbow Six Siege (2015), Knives Out (2017), Fortnite Battle Royale (2017), Monster Hunter: World (2018), PUBG Mobile (2018), Tom Clancy's The Division 2 (2019), Wuthering Waves (2024), and Dead Rising Deluxe Remaster (2024). Leon has a non-player character (NPC) cameo in Trick'N Snowboarder (1999), Ultimate Marvel vs. Capcom 3 (2011), the Nintendo crossover video game Super Smash Bros. Ultimate (2018) as a Spirit power-up, Dying Light 2 (2022), and is referenced as a robot dressed as Leon in Astro Bot (2024).

Leon features in novelizations of the films and games. Comic books based on the games were released, and Leon appears in Resident Evil: The Official Comic Magazine. Leon is a character in Bandai's Resident Evil Deck Building Card Game (2011) and Steamforged Games' Resident Evil 2: The Board Game (2017). The character was featured in Resident Evil-themed attractions at Universal Studios Japan and Universal Orlando's Halloween Horror Nights. Leon's likeness has been used on figurines, outfits, statues, dioramas, gun replicas, standees, keychains, watches, and perfumes. In 2026, to celebrate the release of Requiem, Alamo Drafthouse Cinema introduced a Resident Evil–inspired menu featuring a dish called "Bingo! Fried Chicken". (Note: Bingo! Fried Chicken features boneless chicken wings coated in a flavorful blend of red chili, ginger, garlic, and paprika, finished with a drizzle of thyme-infused hot honey and fresh chopped cilantro. Served with fries, celery sticks, and a green herb ranch dressing.) Staff members also celebrated with Leon cake after it sold seven million copies in two months. (Note: A Leon cake includes raspberries, blueberries, and black frosting with what appears to be a biscuit-based cake topper in the shape of Leon with a pistol.)

== Critical reception ==
Guinness World Records and several video game journalists named Leon S. Kennedy among the most-iconic video game characters. Rachel Weber of GamesRadar+ described Leon as one of the greatest video game characters, praising his resilience and ability to handle crises throughout the series. Magazines praised Leon as the most likable Resident Evil character. IGN editors described him as one of the best Resident Evil protagonists due to his everyman persona, and likened him to John McClane as "an ordinary guy who becomes extraordinary under adverse circumstances". They noted Leon is among the most capable and composed characters in the series.

Critics praised Leon's character growth in Resident Evil 4. Nintendo Power said he changes from a "glorified meter maid with a bad haircut" to a tough guy, while Polygon's Harri Chan commended Leon for his "schlocky action-movie energy". Matt Kim of VG247 praised Leon's relationship with Ada, noting their "spy vs. spy thing" makes for enjoyable and entertaining cutscenes. In the book Immersion, Narrative, and Gender Crisis in Survival Horror Video Games, academic Andrei Nae described Leon's persona as a hypermasculine and likened him to Ethan Thomas from Condemned: Criminal Origins, saying both characters are empowered to defeat their opponents in direct combat and reassert themselves as White, middle-class males. Nae stated their hypermasculinity is incomplete because neither character can fully contain gender and class otherness, which is displayed through Leon's failure to bring Ada within the ambit of patriarchal control. Several lines from the game achieved enduring popularity; Leon says "Where's everyone going? Bingo?" when church bells ring, and villagers stop attacking him to go to the church; and "I knew you'd be fine if you landed on your butt".

Leon's characterization has been praised, and he is often recognized for his sex appeal. Fans lauded his appearance in Resident Evil 2 (2019); Cass Marshall of Polygon said the remake "revives the sexy side of its star". According to Ana Diaz from Polygon, in Resident Evil 4 (2023), Leon's sex appeal inspired fans to make and share "thirsty" videos of the character on the video-sharing platform TikTok, resulting in thousands of fans purposefully injuring Leon to hear his moans of pain, which they interpreted sexually. Ashley Bardhan of Kotaku noted a similar phenomenon for Leon in the game Dead by Daylight. Jennifer Culp of Polygon described Leon as attractive and said his "swoon-inducing crush effect" is about his "Boy Scout determination to see the mission safely concluded" rather than his hair. Fans have praised Leon's reveal in Requiem, once more noting his attractiveness. Kotaku's Kenneth Shepard commented on Leon's sex appeal, praising it for "captur[ing] his sensual aura and swagger" through his animations and humor. Nintendo acknowledged the trend when promoting Requiem on Nintendo Switch 2.
