= Ashley Graham (Resident Evil) =

Fictional character in Resident Evil franchise

- Resident Evil character
- Ashley Graham in Resident Evil 4 (2023)
- First appearance: Resident Evil 4 (2005)
- Designed by: Yasuhisa Kawamura
- Portrayed by: Various: Ella Freya (face) (Resident Evil 4 remake); Sophie S. "PeachMilky" (body) (Resident Evil 4 remake)
- Voiced by: English: Carolyn Lawrence (Resident Evil 4) Genevieve Buechner (Resident Evil 4 remake); Japanese: Akari Kitō (Resident Evil 4 remake)
- Motion capture: Genevieve Buechner (Resident Evil 4 remake)

In-universe information
- Nationality: American

Ashley Graham (Japanese: アシュリー・グラハム, Hepburn: Ashurī Gurahamu) is a character in Resident Evil (Biohazard in Japan), a survival horror video game series created by the Japanese company Capcom. She was introduced in Resident Evil 4 (2005) as a supporting character. She is briefly held captive by the Spanish cult known as Los Iluminados as a means of gaining influence over the United States before being rescued by the protagonist, Leon S. Kennedy.

Ashley was initially designed by game designer Yasuhisa Kawamura as an playable character in the early version of Resident Evil 4. However, after a major restructuring of the development team led to that version being scrapped, her role was reworked into that of a defenseless companion character.

Her characterization in the original 2005 game received a largely negative reception from video game publications, with many questioning her relevance as a stereotypical damsel in distress or usefulness as a sidekick character. In the 2023 remake, she was more positively received after being redesigned to improve the experience of escorting her.

== Concept and design ==
Ashley was originally created as an unnamed character simply referred to as "Girl" by the game designer, Yasuhisa Kawamura. "Girl" was intended to be the second playable character of the initial version of Resident Evil 4. Scenarios featuring the character were written for the "Castle", "Hallucination", and "Zombie" builds. In the "Castle" scenario, she was supposed to be a test subject held against her will within an underground lab beneath a castle. With the help of a B.O.W. dog taught to follow her orders, she manages to escape. Following the 2002 edition of the Tokyo Game Show expo, the "Castle" game script by Kawamura and Noboru Sugimura was discarded, though Kawamura went on a new script based on the same story.

Development was restarted with a version of the "Castle" build script supplied by Sugimura when Shinji Mikami took over as director of the project in late 2003; the original version of Resident Evil 4 which was undergoing development was abandoned. "Girl" was reworked as the daughter of the American President, who the top-secret agent Leon S. Kennedy must search for and rescue. She is written as a "very weak, fragile" companion that the player must lead and help through obstacles and protect from enemies. Ashley is predominantly controlled by artificial intelligence, but can be directed to wait or hide, and there are certain narrative segments of the game that are played from her perspective.

In the remake of Resident Evil 4 (2023), the team aimed to expand Ashley's characterization and relationship with Leon. In contrast to the original, Ashley cannot be left alone and will always follow Leon, though she can be told to stay close or maintain distance. Yasuhiro Ampo, co-director of the remake, explained the change: "As a character, we wanted to have her by your side so she left an impression, and as a game, having her hide while you went and fought in the original was fun in some ways. But having a character like Ashley and then having her basically disappear for a while felt like a waste. We wanted to avoid that in the remake." Ashley's health bar was also removed; however, she will get downed after taking too many blows, and Leon must revive her to continue. She can also be picked up and carried away by enemies, and if carried too far away from Leon without being saved, the game ends. Her outfit and overall design were altered to look and act more like a true partner than a damsel in distress.

Carolyn Lawrence, who provided the voice for Ashley Graham in Resident Evil 4, described her character as "vulnerable, because Leon has to come to her rescue all the time". In June 2022, Dutch model Ella Freya publicly disclosed that she is the face model of Ashley in the remake of Resident Evil 4, while Genevieve Buechner provided her voice.

== Appearances ==
=== In Resident Evil 4 ===
Ashley Graham is the daughter of the newly-elected President of the United States. She is kidnapped by Jack Krauser on her way home from Massachusetts and kept captive by the Los Illuminados in a European town. Leon S. Kennedy's initial goal is to find and rescue her. After finding her, it becomes clear that she has been implanted with a parasites known as "Las Plagas" as part of the cult's plan to gain control of her before returning her to the United States.

The rest of the game is about Leon and Ashley trying to discover a solution to get rid of the parasites inside their bodies before they are taken over by villain Osmund Saddler. After Saddler is eliminated, Leon and Ashley escape the sinking island with a jet ski left by the mysterious spy, Ada Wong. Leon graciously declines Ashley's invitation to visit her at her home. Following that, they are both apprehended by the US government agents and put into detention for debriefing.

Ashley also appears in the 2023 remake of Resident Evil 4. She was reworked via her gameplay, eliminating her health bar and allowing her to be revived after being incapacitated. Ashley can additionally be commanded now, either to provide Leon some space whilst in a fight, or to stick close to him to be more practical, in contrast to in original which had solely used "wait" or "follow me" commands.

=== Other appearances ===
A framed photo of Ashley Graham is briefly glimpsed in the 2021 Netflix animated mini-series Resident Evil: Infinite Darkness, set after the events of Resident Evil 4. Her father, President Graham, is a major character in Infinite Darkness. In 2023, before the release of the remake of Resident Evil 4, Capcom released a promotional anime of the Resident Evil Masterpiece Theater, depicting the story of Leon and Ashley. She also appears as an alternate skin in Dead Rising Deluxe Remaster (2024) for Frank West.

== Reception ==
Ashley's original design and characterization in Resident Evil 4 received criticism for being a sexualized damsel in distress.

Ashley's appearance in the original game received a mostly negative reception. Many gaming media outlets have criticized her as one of the worst or most annoying video game characters. Toadette Geldof of Vice described her as one of the lamest video game characters of all time, commenting that "She's so lame that she can't even really walk on her own, so you have to piggy-back her around and then set her back down any time you need to kill something." In Tropes vs. Women in Video Games, feminist media critic Anita Sarkeesian also described Ashley as a damsel in distress who appears to be helpless, arguing that defending her caused players a lot of frustration. Samara Summer of GamePro wished that Ashley does not appear in the remake of Resident Evil 4, commenting that "She can't fight, she can't free herself and she can't even look for a hiding place on her own. With her screaming she doesn't motivate me to help her either."

Conversely, David Craddock of Shacknews cited Ashley as one of his favorite video game companions, saying that "When you are saddled with her, she's perfectly content to hide in a dumpster while you clear out enemies. If only all companions were so agreeable." Academic Andrei Nae of Immersion, Narrative, and Gender Crisis in Survival Horror Video Games said that Ashley Graham fully embodies the gender role of damsel in distress with her constant pleas to Leon Kennedy to help her, while critic Bernard Perron of The World of Scary Video Games: A Study in Videoludic Horror felt that some characters, like Ashley, have been eroticized in which she can swap her schoolgirl uniform into a white starlet costume that "highlights her breasts".

Her portrayal in the 2023 remake, by contrast, received praise, with many critics highlighting how less of a sexualized damsel in distress she is. Joseph Yaden of Inverse and Ed Smith of PCGamesN both noted that Ashley had shifted from being a helpless damsel in distress to more of a partner. Jade King of TheGamer and Ashley Bardhan of Kotaku both praised Ashley's new character model to avoid sexualizing, including by eliminating the possibility of players looking up her skirt, but Bardhan criticized the lack of overall improvement in her characterization.

Ashley has become an internet meme on Twitter known as "Mouseley", or "Moushley", stemming from a piece of fanart depicting Ashley as a mouse that was shared by fans. They have additionally created various mods involving her. Capcom also acknowledged it, and the official Resident Evil account tweeted emojis of a mouse and cheese in response to the meme.
