= Resident Evil 6 =

2012 video game

- Developer: Capcom (Note: Ported to Windows by QLOC S.A.)
- Publisher: Capcom
- Director: Eiichiro Sasaki
- Producer: Yoshiaki Hirabayashi
- Designer: Jiro Taoka
- Programmer: Soji Seta
- Artist: Tomonori Takano
- Writer: Shōtarō Suga
- Composers: Akihiko Narita; Akiyuki Morimoto; Kōta Suzuki; Azusa Kato; Thomas Parisch; Laurent Ziliani; Daniel Lindholm; Sebastian Schwartz
- Series: Resident Evil
- Engine: MT Framework
- Platforms: PlayStation 3; Xbox 360; Windows; PlayStation 4; Xbox One; Nintendo Switch
- Release: 2 October 2012: PlayStation 3, Xbox 360; WW: 2 October 2012; JP: 4 October 2012 Windows; AU: 21 March 2013; WW: 22 March 2013 PlayStation 4, Xbox One; WW: 29 March 2016 Nintendo Switch; WW: October 29, 2019
- Genre: Third-person shooter
- Modes: Single-player, multiplayer

Resident Evil 6 (Note: Known in Japan as Biohazard 6 (Japanese: バイオハザード6, Hepburn: Baiohazādo Shikkusu)) is a 2012 third-person shooter video game developed and published by Capcom. It was released for the PlayStation 3 and Xbox 360 in October 2012, and for Windows in March 2013. It was re-released with all downloadable content for the PlayStation 4 and Xbox One in March 2016, and for the Nintendo Switch in October 2019. Players control Leon S. Kennedy, Helena Harper, Chris Redfield, Piers Nivans, Jake Muller, Sherry Birkin, and Ada Wong as they confront the force behind a worldwide bio-terrorist attack. The story is centred around Leon's, Chris', Jake's, and Ada's four interwoven campaigns, and every campaign features a unique style in both tone and gameplay. Helena, Piers, and Sherry are side characters in the main 4's campaign, but can be used as playable characters.

Resident Evil 6 was conceived in 2009 and entered full development the following year under Resident Evil 4 producer Hiroyuki Kobayashi. It had a development staff of more than 600, making it Capcom's largest production. Resident Evil 6 received mixed reviews from critics, who praised the graphics, artificial intelligence and controls, but criticized the execution of the interwoven campaigns and departure from the survival horror roots of the franchise in favor of a more action-oriented style. Despite these criticisms, the game sold 15.2 million units by September 2025. Resident Evil 7: Biohazard, released in 2017, switched to a first-person perspective and returned to the survival horror genre.

== Gameplay ==
In the Langshiang scenario, the player controls Leon S. Kennedy before engaging an enemy. Leon's health and ammunition are displayed at the bottom right corner of the screen.

A screenshot showing a co-op scenario in Langshiang involving Ada Wong aiming her weapon at a Strelac while the Agent character grapples with it.

Resident Evil 6 allows players to select between four scenarios with interwoven storylines centered on Division of Security Operations (DSO) agent Leon S. Kennedy, Bioterrorism Security Assessment Alliance (BSAA) Captain Chris Redfield, mercenary Jake Muller and spy Ada Wong.

In the Leon, Chris and Jake scenarios, players have the option of controlling either them or their respective partners, United States Secret Service agent Helena Harper, BSAA sniper Piers Nivans and DSO agent Sherry Birkin. The character not selected by the player is controlled by either artificial intelligence (AI) or another player via local or online multiplayer. Ada's scenario can be played with or without a partner and a second player who joins will control the non-canonical character Agent. In addition, each scenario features a different play-style; for example, some player-characters are more vulnerable to attacks whereas others are more resilient. Each central character has unique abilities, which vary from faster reload times and carrying more ammunition. Resident Evil 6 presents new gameplay mechanics such as rolling in any direction and running while shooting and sliding. The game also features a four-player co-operative mode. When playing in single player mode, the player can allow another player to join in online at any time. While performing certain actions, quick time events may occur, in which the player must follow onscreen prompts by pressing buttons or manipulating joysticks within a limited amount of time.

A new feature comes in the form of tablets; players may consume them in order to recover health, and more can be produced by mixing herbs. If one player runs out of health, that player will have a short time to try to defend themselves while their partners attempt to revive them. If any non-AI players are killed, gameplay will resume at the last checkpoint. The game features several primary enemies, including zombies and the newly introduced J'avo. Unlike zombies, J'avo are able to interact with each other to plan an attack, use weapons and heal themselves. Also some J'avo are susceptible to various mutations that increase their prowess in battle, the type of mutation sometimes depends on location of the injury. There are a total of 15 different mutations within the game. Certain enemies drop skill points when killed, which can be picked up and spent on upgrades such as increased weapon effectiveness or specific ammunition drops. The campaigns feature a "Lone Wolf" ability which allows the player to remove their artificial intelligence companion character. Players can equip three of these upgrades which apply to all campaigns. The game also features a stamina bar; which depletes once the player performs melee attacks, or uses a "quickshot"—which involves shooting a zombie with a headshot instantly. Resident Evil 6 is twice as long as Resident Evil 5.

The game features two new modes. "Mercenaries" mode involves players fighting for survival against hordes of enemies. In the PC version, the Mercenaries mode features an exclusive sub-mode named "No Mercy", which involves the cast from Left 4 Dead 2 fighting a total number of 300 enemies against a timer. "Agent Hunt" mode allows players to take control of random enemies in other people's online sessions; however, it is only unlocked after the player clears the three main campaigns. The longer the player stays in another online session, the more points they will earn.

== Plot ==
On 24 December 2012, mercenary Jake Muller (Troy Baker / Daisuke Namikawa) is fighting in a civil war within the Eastern European country of Edonia when his employers, the Edonian Liberation Army, unknowingly turn themselves into intelligent and adaptive bio-weapons known as J'avo after using injections supplied by the bio-terrorist group Neo-Umbrella. Jake is unaffected, and during his escape from the berserking rebels partners with Division of Security Operations (DSO) agent and Raccoon City survivor Sherry Birkin (Eden Riegel / Maaya Sakamoto), learning that she is to extract him from the country to create a vaccine for the newly emerged C-virus; Jake accepts on the promise of a lucrative payout. However, they are relentlessly hunted by Ustanak, a hulking bio-weapon. Meanwhile, the Bio-terrorism Security Assessment Alliance (BSAA) intervenes in the conflict, leading to a strike team led by Chris Redfield (Roger Craig Smith / Hiroki Tōchi) and Piers Nivans (Christopher Emerson / Shuhei Sakaguchi) being deployed to eliminate the rampaging J'avo. After briefly being assisted by Jake and Sherry, who are soon after extracted by helicopter, they are attacked by the leader of Neo-Umbrella, who claims to be Ada Wong (Courtenay Taylor / Junko Minagawa); she kills the entire team, except Chris and Piers, using a device that injects them with the C-virus, turning them into J'avo. Chris goes into a self-imposed exile, afflicted with post-traumatic amnesia. Meanwhile, Sherry and Jake's helicopter is attacked by Ustanak, forcing them to crash land into the mountains where they are captured by Neo-Umbrella and experimented on for six months, during which Jake learns that he is the son of late bio-terrorist Albert Wesker.

On 29 June 2013, US President Adam Benford (Michael Donovan / Katsuhiko Sasaki) plans to publicly disclose the truth behind the 1998 Raccoon City incident and the government's dealings with Umbrella to prevent further bio-terrorism. However, the venue, located in the American town of Tall Oaks, is hit by a gaseous form of the C-virus that zombifies its victims; the President is among the infected, forcing the only survivors, DSO agent and Raccoon City survivor Leon S. Kennedy (Matthew Mercer / Toshiyuki Morikawa) and Secret Service agent Helena Harper (Laura Bailey / Mayumi Sako), to kill him before making their way out of Tall Oaks. The pair encounters Ada during their escape, and Leon learns that National Security Advisor Derek Simmons (David Lodge / Takayuki Sugō) is affiliated with Neo-Umbrella and orchestrated the attack by blackmailing Helena into providing an opening in the President's security detail. Simmons frames Leon and Helena as the culprits behind it, forcing the two to fake their deaths and pursue him to Lanshiang, China.

The next day, Jake and Sherry escape from their captivity and make their way to Simmons, Sherry's superior, while Chris returns to duty in the BSAA with Piers and a new team in Lanshiang, where Neo-Umbrella has launched an open offensive using an army of J'avo. Chris recovers from his amnesia and recklessly pursues Ada, resulting in most of his unit sans Piers being killed before they cross paths with Leon and Helena, who intervene unaware of Ada's apparent involvement in Neo-Umbrella. After the resulting brawl, Leon manages to talk Chris down from killing Ada in a fit of rage before going their separate ways. Leon, Helena, Sherry, and Jake confront Simmons over his involvement with the outbreaks, during which Sherry covertly hands Jake's medical data to Leon in case of their capture. Simmons, infected by a J'avo on the orders of a now-rogue Ada, admits to assassinating the President in a deluded attempt to maintain national security and protect America's authority on the world stage. Sherry and Jake are captured again by Neo-Umbrella after they leave, while Leon and Helena defeat a mutated Simmons. Meanwhile, Chris and Piers pursue Ada to an aircraft carrier, but she is assassinated by one of Simmons' men in retaliation before the BSAA can take her into custody; they then attempt to prevent the launch of a cruise missile loaded with the C-virus by Neo-Umbrella, but ultimately fail, leading to a massive outbreak in Lanshiang. Both Leon and Chris call to tell each other of Jake's true identity and capture and Ada's assassination, before a disheartened Leon and Helena attempt to escape the outbreak. With the assistance of a still-living Ada, they kill a further mutated Simmons for good.

Chris and Piers head into an underwater facility beneath an oil platform, where they free Jake and Sherry from captivity before they all cross paths with Haos, a massive bio-weapon activated by Ada's apparent death with the intent of spreading the C-virus on a global scale. After the pairs split, Chris and Piers attempt to fight Haos directly, initially to little effect. Severely injured, Piers injects himself with the C-virus to turn the tide of the battle, allowing them to defeat Haos. However, aware of his inevitable mutation, Piers sacrifices himself by forcing Chris into an escape pod and using his mutated abilities to destroy the facility. Meanwhile, Jake resolves to be a better man than his father was, and together with Sherry kills Ustanak as they escape on a rocket-powered lift to the surface.

Several days prior to the Tall Oaks attack, Ada Wong (also Taylor / Minagawa) is contacted by Simmons, a former client of hers and leader of an American fraternity known as The Family, to investigate a Neo-Umbrella submarine, finding a briefing for a mission in Edonia addressed to her despite never taking part in it. Following the resulting trail to Tall Oaks and Lanshiang, Ada discovers that the "Simmons" that hired her is actually Carla Radames, a scientist who was forced to transform into a clone of Ada by Simmons, having become obsessively enamored with the spy. Carla's former identity eventually resurfaced, driving her insane, and she seized control of the Family's assets in Lanshiang to form Neo-Umbrella as a way to exact revenge on Simmons, subsequently becoming the "Ada Wong" which Chris had encountered. Although presumed dead after her assassination, a delirious Carla attempts a final attack against Ada after injecting herself with a powerful dose of the C-virus, but is killed. Ada then helps Leon and Helena in their fight against Simmons, and later destroys the laboratory where Carla was developed before accepting a new assignment. Leon and Helena are cleared for duty; Chris remains with the BSAA in command of a new squad after overcoming his guilt; Sherry continues her work as a DSO agent; and Jake begins a new life combating bioterrorism in a developing country, with his identity concealed by the BSAA.

== Development and release ==
We brought zombies back because they're popular. Based on feedback from Resident Evil 4 and Resident Evil 5, the fact that there weren't classic zombies in those games and people really wanted them. We tried to respond to the requests and put them in this game.

— Producer Hiroyuki Kobayashi speaking in an interview with Siliconera

Resident Evil 6 was conceptualized soon after the release of Resident Evil 5, and entered full development in 2009. Resident Evil 5 producer Jun Takeuchi said that he considered a "completely new system" for Resident Evil 6, but ruled out his involvement. In March 2009, co-producer Masachika Kawata stated that the new installment was not decided upon, but admitted that it could take Capcom four to eight years to develop. Kawata later claimed that the new game will be drastically different from its predecessors. The game was directed by Eiichiro Sasaki, who also directed the Resident Evil Outbreak series. When development of the game first begun, producer Yoshiaki Hirabayashi wanted to revolve the game around the "ultimate horror entertainment", bearing in mind that the team considered the upcoming Resident Evil 6 to be the flagship title of the horror genre. In a February 2012 interview, Hirabayashi stated that he went to lengths to balance "all of the things people love" about the series, so the team focused to orientate gameplay around horror themes. Each of the four campaigns was designed around a different expression of horror: Leon's story reflecting "gothic, classic Resident Evil-style horror", Chris' story "a horror of the battlefield", Jake's story involving the fear of being stalked, and Ada's story being "a very classic Resident Evil-style" experience. In March 2012, Capcom admitted that it believed the survival-horror market was too small for Resident Evil, and issued a statement that the development team would instead choose to orientate the gameplay around the action genre.

The development of the game was led by Hiroyuki Kobayashi, who was stated by Capcom to be aiming to "deliver the most impressive Resident Evil title ever both in terms of scope and production values". Capcom also asserted that the game was meant to take an approach to "evolve" the series. The staff wanted to give the game a new setting with Sasaki wishing to place it in China. While the country of Edonia was not modelled from any particular country in Europe, it was given an Eastern European theme. It was Kobayashi's idea to bring back Leon for Resident Evil 6, as well as make him central to the story. According to Famitsu, the character of Jake Muller was designed to be "someone today's young people can empathize with". The game had a development staff of more than 600, making it Capcom's largest production to date. The decision to bring back zombies into Resident Evil 6 was made by Kobayashi, who felt that they were a popular component for the franchise, as well as complying per fans' requests. Hirabayashi admitted that the game had radically changed at the end of the development cycle, due to the new concepts it introduced to the series. On 21 August 2012, Resident Evil 6 went gold and initiated its online service.

An official trailer was released on 19 January 2012. At a Microsoft press briefing at E3 2012, the first gameplay demonstration was shown, depicting Leon and Helena fighting hordes of zombies in China. A playable demo of Resident Evil 6 was scheduled for release on the PlayStation Network and Xbox Live Marketplace on 5 September 2012. Capcom later announced that the demo would become available for both Xbox 360 and PlayStation 3 owners on 18 September 2012. Early access to the demo was included with Dragon's Dogma. As a result of criticism of the first demo, Capcom brought a different version of the demo to the 2012 San Diego Comic-Con, modifying various parts of its gameplay. Originally scheduled to be released on 20 November 2012, the game's release date was pushed forward to 2 October 2012. Prior to the game's launch, several copies of the game were stolen and were sold in Poland.

Resident Evil 6 was also contained in Biohazard Anniversary Package, a special edition for Resident Evil's seventeenth anniversary released in Japan on 22 March 2013 alongside the PC version. Resident Evil 6 was re-released on PlayStation 4 and Xbox One with graphical enhancements and all DLC on 29 March 2016. It was released on the Nintendo Switch on 29 October 2019.

=== Downloadable content ===
In response to a public backlash over classifying on-disc content as downloadable content (DLC), Capcom released a patch in December 2012 free of charge. The patch included new camera controls, a new difficulty mode named "No Hope", an option to play Ada's campaign without having to complete the other three, and the addition of an online co-op partner for Ada's campaign simply called "Agent". Unlike any other character in the game, Agent cannot interact with doors and treasure chests; he also disappears when cutscenes are triggered.

On 18 December 2012, a new multiplayer (DLC) was released with three new multiplayer modes: "Predator", "Survivors" and "Onslaught". Predator mode is a series of quick fire rounds with up to six players who take turns as the fearsome Ustanak and have full access to its weapons. The other players in "Predator" mode must avoid capture and being killed by the Ustanak. Human players score points for successful attacks, but also lose points for being caught and/or taken down. This match type is over once all have played as the Ustanak, with the participant with the most points crowned as the winner. Survivors mode is Resident Evil's take on the classic solo and team based deathmatch mode. Survivors is available for 2 to 6 players. Onslaught is a two player mode where each must clear waves of oncoming enemies. The twist comes when a player completes a combo chain as this will send enemies over to their opponent's screen.

On 4 April 2013, a Left 4 Dead 2 crossover DLC was released for the PC version, adding the main characters and two monsters from Left 4 Dead 2 to the PC-exclusive The Mercenaries: No Mercy mode in Resident Evil 6. Various weapons, characters and monsters from Resident Evil 6 have also been added as optionally downloadable replacement skins on the PC version of Left 4 Dead 2.

== Reception ==
Reception

Aggregate score
Aggregator	Score
Metacritic	PS3: 74/100; X360: 67/100; PC: 69/100; PS4: 60/100; XONE: 63/100; NS: 69/100

Review scores
Publication	Score
1Up.com	C+
Destructoid	3/10
Edge	6/10
Eurogamer	6/10
Famitsu	10/10/10/9 (Note: Weekly Famitsu's four reviewers gave Resident Evil 6 four 9/10 ratings and one 10/10 rating.)
G4	2.5/5
Game Informer	8.75/10
GameSpot	4.5/10
GamesRadar+	3.5/5
GameTrailers	8.8/10
Giant Bomb	2/5
IGN	7.9/10
Official Xbox Magazine (UK)	8/10
The Escapist	3/5

According to review aggregator website Metacritic, Resident Evil 6 received "mixed or average" reviews. The website described the game as "the first game in the main series that failed to receive a positive reception from game critics" and reported that the critics "complained about bloat and inconsistency", and felt that "RE6 was more generic shooter than distinctive survival horror game."

Critics praised the graphics, AI and controls. A reviewer from Game Informer stated that the game did not "hold back" the decadent experience from being an "unhinged flaming rollercoaster ride". A reviewer from the Official Xbox Magazine concluded that the game was an accomplished shooter, and a fittingly "thunderous" send-off for Resident Evil, while also praising the length and variety of the game. GameTrailers noted the shift away from the style and tone of past games in the series, yet still praised the overall direction, stating that despite the "old identity stripped away", the game presented itself as a "massive" action game. Richard George of IGN was favourable toward the technical and artistic design of the game, stating that the game was among Capcom's greatest successes with an "incredibly strong" world, lighting and creature designs. Ryan McCaffrey of IGN also noted the new enemies as "some of the best" designs and concepts in the history of the franchise. Hollander Cooper of GamesRadar praised the improvements to the controls over its predecessor, stating that the game had an emphasis placed on fluidity and movement, although noted that the cover system "never seems to work right". The Escapist also praised the improved AI companion that "does a decent job of backing you up and taking the fight to the enemy rather than just standing by", while, however, disliking the cover system, calling it "the most forgettable new feature of the game". Jose Otero of 1Up.com also praised the improvements to the game's controls but stated: "While building on that game's (Resident Evil 4's) masterful formula of stop-and-pop gunplay is a smart approach, RE6 serves as proof that too many compromises and too much empowerment can ultimately erode what makes Resident Evil, at its core, work."

The game's four campaigns received criticism from reviewers. Simon Parkin from Eurogamer was divided over the campaigns, citing Leon's campaign as the strongest and "the closest we get to the series' survival horror roots", along with Ada's as having "diverse flavour". However, Parkin criticised the other two campaigns, stating that Jake's campaign "rarely delights" while citing that Chris's was a "second-rate third-person sprint" with "idiotic" cutscene dialogue. A reviewer from Edge also felt that the campaigns noticeably contrasted in quality more than others. Similarly, Kevin VanOrd from GameSpot concluded that the game's campaigns were the ultimate test of patience for "even the most dedicated", while Destructoid cited Resident Evil 6 as not only a "step back" for the series due to the game's new and unconventional features, but a "step back for commonplace, unassuming action-shooters".

In an interview with the Official PlayStation Blog, Resident Evil 6 executive producer Hiroyuki Kobayashi responded to fan criticism shortly after release, noting the creative differences with fans. He stated "the fans and us as creators are the two parents [...] and just like real parents, you're not always going to agree on what is best for raising that child," going on to say, "we want to make sure that what we do pleases them but the initial reaction might not always be positive. We do listen to the fans but we can't be beholden to them at every turn or I don't think we'll ever make progress in terms of the series' development".

While Capcom dubbed the game a "dramatic horror", several critics noted its departure from the survival horror genre compared to previous installments, and listed the genre simply as an action shooter. Resident Evil 7: Biohazard, released in 2017, switched to a first-person perspective and returned to the series' survival horror roots.

=== Sales ===
In May 2012, Capcom announced they expected the game to sell 7 million copies by the end of the 2012 fiscal year; however, the company lowered their expectations to 6 million due to the game's mixed reception. Capcom announced that it had shipped 4.5 million copies worldwide, setting a new record for the company. In October 2012, the game sold 806,000 copies in the United States. According to Capcom, sales weakened following the strong start, with the company admitting that the game would not meet their goals, and consequently lowered their financial projections for the fiscal year. By May 2026, it had sold 16.88 million copies.

In February 2013, Capcom said in a statement that the game suffered from poor sales due to various development challenges and "inadequate organisational collaboration" across the company.

Resident Evil 6 had sold 4.9 million units by March 2013. By October 2013, the game had sold 5.2 million units worldwide, becoming one of Capcom's best-selling games. Resident Evil 6 became Capcom's seventh-best-selling game by September 2025, selling 9.9 million units on PlayStation 3 and Xbox 360 with its original release. PlayStation 4 and Xbox One versions had sold 4.2 million units by September 2025. Nintendo Switch version has sold 1.1 million units by June 2025. Total sales are 15.2 million units as of September 2025.

=== Accolades ===
Resident Evil 6 was one of the recipients of the Award for Excellence at the Japan Game Awards 2013. It won the Best Sound Editing: Computer Interactive Entertainment at the 2013 Golden Reel Awards. The game was also nominated for Best Original Score – Video Game at the Hollywood Music in Media Awards.
