= Recurring elements in the Resident Evil series =

The logo of the Resident Evil series since 2015.

Resident Evil is horror media franchise developed and published by Capcom. It began with Resident Evil in 1996. The early games combine exploration and combat with restricted inventories, scarce ammunition and healing items, and save points in the form of typewriters. Their stories concern biological weapons and experiments, often discovered through documents left in the places the player explores.

The recurring elements in the Resident Evil series include biological outbreaks, mutated creatures, environmental puzzles and the management of limited supplies and inventory spaces. The games have used several camera and control systems. The early installments use fixed viewpoints and tank controls, while Resident Evil 4 introduced an over-the-shoulder camera and placed more emphasis on shooting. Resident Evil 7: Biohazard adopted a first-person view. Later games and remakes have reused or modified earlier systems, including item storage and the arrangement of equipment within a limited inventory.

== Development ==
From left: director of the 1998 video game Resident Evil 2 Hideki Kamiya, Hideo Kojima, Resident Evil Zero producer Tatsuya Minami, and the director of the 1996 video game Resident Evil Shinji Mikami, in June 2014.

The 1996 video game Resident Evil commenced development as an attempt to adapt the mechanics of Capcom's Sweet Home. Producer Tokuro Fujiwara instructed director Shinji Mikami to use them as the basis for a horror game. Mikami also adopted the fixed-background presentation of the 1992 video game Alone in the Dark. His initial idea involved ghosts in a haunted house. He replaced them with zombies after considering how the player would fight them, drawing on George A. Romero's 1978 film Dawn of the Dead.

Mikami recalled that he initially doubted the suitability of a series because players could become accustomed to recurring horror patterns. Producer Masachika Kawata has identified tense atmosphere, exploration, item management, combat and puzzle-solving as the series' survival horror foundations. Producer Jun Takeuchi describes its gameplay as a cycle of tension and release: players are frightened and have limited resources, but are given the means to fight back and overcome threats. In discussing the series' changing presentation, he explained that returning to its roots meant recreating the fear experienced by the original game's players while adapting its systems for a new audience.

Camera placement has been used to control what players see and their sense of proximity to threats. The original game pairs three-dimensional characters with pre-rendered backgrounds, allowing more detailed environments than the hardware could render in real time. Mikami said that the team deliberately positioned the cameras to create blind spots, so that players could hear zombies before seeing them. Kawata explained the first-person perspective in Resident Evil 7 as a way of bringing enemies, exploration and traps closer to the player. He also stressed that survival could require avoiding combat or using items against enemies in different ways.

The initial monster designs consisted of enlarged animals and insects; the team added invented creatures when these proved insufficient. According to Mikami, retaining features of real animals made the monsters more frightening. Takeuchi sought a similar unease in the human enemies of Resident Evil 7, emphasising the fear of people whose behaviour unexpectedly changes. Art director Hirofumi Nakaoka explained the decision to retain the chainsaw villager's ordinary human build in the Resident Evil 4 remake in similar terms: its familiar appearance made its behaviour more disturbing.

Village director Morimasa Sato cited the Merchant from Resident Evil 4 as a model for the game's merchant, while producer Peter Fabiano compared the two games' inventory systems.

== Narrative and setting ==
The Resident Evil series draws on Gothic, science-fiction and folk horror, with settings including mansions, laboratories and isolated villages. The first game begins in the Spencer Mansion and eventually takes the player into a laboratory.

=== Infection and Bio-Organic Weapons ===
Zombies recur as humans transformed by infection into decaying, flesh-eating creatures. Documents in the original game reveal that the pharmaceutical company Umbrella Corporation conducts experiments at the mansion and plans to use the protagonists' S.T.A.R.S. team to test Bio-Organic Weapons or B.O.W.'s. The t-virus zombies of the early games include zombified police officers and other inhabitants of Raccoon City. Infectious agents recur in subsequent games. These include the G-virus, the Uroboros virus, the parasitic Las Plagas arthropods of Resident Evil 4 and Resident Evil 5, and the Mold fungus in Resident Evil 7 and Resident Evil Village.

Umbrella's principal B.O.W. programme is the humanoid Tyrant Project, which seeks to combine exceptional physical strength, durability and regenerative ability with sufficient intelligence to understand and carry out orders. Unlike zombies and many other creatures produced incidentally by uncontrolled outbreaks, Tyrants are deliberately developed as controllable weapons. The T-002 encountered in the original Resident Evil is a large, slow-moving creature with great physical strength. It serves as the prototype for the mass-produced T-103, which has improved recovery and command-following abilities. Tyrants can mutate into faster, more aggressive Super Tyrants when badly injured. It represents Umbrella's first successful breakthrough in producing a Tyrant with more human-like intelligence. Mr. X, the trench-coated Tyrant in Resident Evil 2, is sent to recover a virus sample and eliminate survivors. Nemesis, introduced in Resident Evil 3: Nemesis, is a Tyrant implanted with a parasite that increases its intelligence. It can use weapons and is deployed to kill surviving S.T.A.R.S. members.

Umbrella's B.O.W. programme also extends to non-mammalian species as the corporation tested the t-virus across numerous animal, plant and insect species to produce purpose-built weapons. Hunters are agile, clawed B.O.W.s created by combining reptilian and other genetic material with a fertilised human ovum. Variants include the Hunter α, β and γ. Cerberuses are Dobermans infected with the t-virus for military use; other zombie dogs result from accidental infection, including the consumption of contaminated food. Other creatures include Neptune, a great white shark enlarged by t-virus experiments, and Plant 43, or Ivy, a mobile plant weapon developed from research into the accidentally created Plant 42. Plague Crawlers are large insects with scythe-like forelimbs, developed by genetically manipulating successive generations of infected insects.

Not every creature described as a B.O.W. was originally engineered from Umbrella's research, as some arose accidentally when experimental animals or wildlife became infected. Yawn is a venomous snake bred as an experimental animal that escaped and grew to enormous size after contracting the t-virus. Lickers originate from further mutation of zombies. They are blind, hunt by sound and attack with long tongues and claws. Having originated through an unintended progression of the t-virus infection in human zombies, they are subsequently adopted as B.O.W.s. In Resident Evil 5, Tricell develops the Licker β variant by administering the Progenitor virus to Lickers.

Other humanoid enemies have different origins: the Ooze in Resident Evil: Revelations are humans whose T-Abyss infection leaves their bodies swollen and partly liquefied, while the shambling Molded in Resident Evil 7 are fungal creatures formed from Mold that feeds on corpses. The parasite-controlled Ganados of Resident Evil 4 retain their intelligence and ability to communicate, while the Majini of Resident Evil 5 can use firearms and take cover.

=== Documents and recordings ===
Documents found during exploration provide clues and recount events before the player's arrival. The original game's Keeper's Diary begins with an employee's routine activities and becomes less coherent as he succumbs to infection. Other records disclose the laboratory accident and Umbrella's plans for S.T.A.R.S.

Resident Evil 7 includes playable videotapes. These place the player in another character's role at an earlier point in the story. The recordings preview locations and dangers and can supply knowledge needed to solve a puzzle later.

== Gameplay ==
=== Multiple protagonists ===
The first Resident Evil game allows a choice between Jill Valentine and Chris Redfield. Chris can withstand more damage, while Jill has a lockpick and more inventory space. Chris meets Rebecca Chambers, while Jill is assisted by Barry Burton. Resident Evil 2 uses separate campaigns for Leon S. Kennedy and Claire Redfield; actions in one playthrough can leave supplies available to the other character.

Resident Evil Zero allows switching between Rebecca and Billy Coen. Billy can move heavy objects and withstand more damage, while Rebecca can mix chemicals. In Resident Evil: Revelations 2, armed protagonists are paired with companions who have other abilities. Moira Burton uses a flashlight to find concealed items, while Natalia Korda can enter spaces too small for Barry.

=== Perspective and controls ===
Early games use predetermined camera positions. Some views conceal parts of a room or corridor, leaving enemies outside the frame. Their tank controls make movement relative to the character: pressing forward moves in the direction the character faces, while left and right rotate them. This keeps the controls consistent when the camera cuts to a different angle.

Resident Evil 4 places the camera behind Leon's shoulder. It allows the player to aim directly at enemies, although threats can approach outside the narrower field of view. In the original game, the player cannot move while firing. The remakes of Resident Evil 2, Resident Evil 3 and Resident Evil 4 also use an over-the-shoulder camera.

Resident Evil 7 and Resident Evil Village use a first-person view, while Resident Evil Requiem offers both first- and third-person perspectives. By default, Requiem presents Grace Ashcroft's sections in first person and Leon's in third person. Grace's sections emphasise stealth and slower survival horror, while Leon's emphasise combat.

=== Pursuer enemies ===
Several games feature pursuers that cannot be permanently defeated during their initial encounters. These include Mr. X in Resident Evil 2, Nemesis in Resident Evil 3: Nemesis, Ustanak in Resident Evil 6, Jack Baker in Resident Evil 7 and Lady Dimitrescu in Village. Their behaviour varies between games: in the Resident Evil 2 remake, Mr. X searches the police station, with heavy footsteps signalling his approach, while Lady Dimitrescu patrols her castle and pursues Ethan when she finds him. Ustanak's pursuit of Jake Muller and Sherry Birkin instead unfolds through scripted encounters. Lisa Trevor in the Resident Evil remake is another unkillable pursuer, following the player through parts of the mansion estate and requiring escape rather than a conventional victory in combat.

=== Inventory and resources ===
In the original game, ammunition and healing supplies are finite, and defeated enemies do not drop replacements. Maximum health, weapon strength and carrying capacity cannot be upgraded. Additional weapons use different ammunition types. Storage boxes allow equipment to be set aside when the inventory is full.

In the 2019 Resident Evil 2 remake, items deposited in one box can be retrieved from another. The inventory can also be expanded by collecting hip pouches. The 2019 remake also uses green herbs to restore health; combining them with red herbs increases their healing effect. Mixtures occupy less inventory space than their separate ingredients.

Resident Evil 4 uses an attaché case in which equipment occupies differently sized areas. Players rearrange items to fit weapons, ammunition and healing supplies into the available space. Village uses a similar grid inventory and a merchant, the Duke, who sells supplies, weapons and larger cases. It also allows the crafting of medicine and ammunition from collected materials.

=== Exploration and puzzles ===
The early games require players to return to previously visited areas with newly acquired objects. Keys, emblems and other puzzle items open routes to new locations. Limited carrying capacity also requires journeys back to storage boxes. Maps record the rooms and areas already visited, but do not identify the enemies occupying them.

=== Saving and safe rooms ===
The early games use typewriters as save points, with saving dependent on a supply of ink ribbons. Save rooms can contain both a typewriter and an item box.

== Presentation ==
=== Door transitions ===
The original game's loading screens show doors opening, stairs or lifts against a black background. Resident Evil 2 interrupts one door-opening animation with two approaching zombies.

=== Music and sound ===
The Save Room theme, originally composed by Masami Ueda, has returned in later installments. The Resident Evil 4 remake's save and merchant themes arrange music from the original game, while other tracks retain its use of noise through new recordings and production techniques.

The remake's music changes according to whether enemies are absent, nearby or engaged in combat. An audible enemy can trigger battle music before the player sees it. Environmental audio combines layers of room tone, local effects and weather.

== Reception and influence ==
The first Resident Evil popularised survival horror and supplied the genre's name. Its use of tank controls and fixed viewpoints has attracted both criticism and retrospective defence. Giancarlo Varanini of GameSpot found the controls awkward against the faster enemies in Resident Evil Zero. Matt Perez of PC Gamer acknowledged their unnatural feel, but argued that keeping movement independent of the camera allowed dramatic framing without disorienting changes to the controls. Keith Stuart credited the shoulder camera and surrounding enemies in Resident Evil 4 with making its action more immediate and threatening.

The series' approach to inventory management has been praised for contributing to tension and providing a puzzle in its own right. Harrison Abbott of Bloody Disgusting argued that the early games' limited carrying capacity made choosing weapons and healing supplies a tactical decision before leaving a safe room. He praised the attaché case in Resident Evil 4 both as an arrangement puzzle and as a pause in combat that allowed players to reconsider their approach. Matt Elliott of PC Gamer praised the ammunition trade-offs in the Resident Evil 2 remake, including whether to make handgun rounds immediately or save gunpowder for shotgun shells.

The over-the-shoulder camera and shooting in Resident Evil 4 influenced Gears of War, according to producer Jun Takeuchi's recollection of conversations with its developers. The game also changed the direction of Dead Space, which had initially been planned as a possible System Shock sequel. Designer Ben Wanat said that allowing movement while shooting required the team to find other ways to produce the tension created by Resident Evil 4. Thomas Grip of Frictional Games identified the series' combination of action, exploration and puzzles, and its use of encounters with distinct moods, as influences on his work on Amnesia: The Dark Descent and Soma.

The inventory system has also been adapted independently of combat. Save Room – Organization Puzzle turns arranging equipment, reloading, healing and combining items into puzzles; Christopher Livingston of PC Gamer compared it to the attaché case in Resident Evil 4. Joshua Rivera of Polygon identified Resident Evil 4 as a precedent for the combination of horror and spatial inventory puzzles in Dredge and Sons of the Forest. The early games' presentation has remained a point of comparison for later horror games: Andrew Webster of The Verge described Signalis, Crow Country and Fear the Spotlight as retaining the visual style of PlayStation-era survival horror while updating its gameplay.

The games' recurring mechanics and imagery have also been adapted to film. For the 2026 Resident Evil film, which has an original story that does not adapt narrative elements from the video game series, director Zach Cregger instead sought to reproduce resource conservation and weapon progression, and copied the appearance of healing items from Resident Evil 4. The film uses first-person sequences and includes green herbs, medical sprays, a typewriter and locks requiring particular keys. Brian Tallerico of RogerEbert.com praised its use of dwindling supplies and successive objectives to recreate the appeal of survival horror. Leah J. Williams of ScreenHub likewise recognised the games' structure and atmosphere, but criticised the frequency of its references to familiar objects.

=== Interpretation ===
Bernard Perron describes the mansion as both a refuge and a trap: the protagonists enter it to escape danger, then have to breach its defences to get out. He identifies the labyrinth as a recurring spatial motif in the mansion, Raccoon City and the island setting of Resident Evil – Code: Veronica. Rich Stanton connected the original game's repeatedly explored mansion with the confined house of Beginning Hour, the teaser for Resident Evil 7. Keith Stuart connected the threatening household in Resident Evil 7 with the political suspicion surrounding Brexit and Donald Trump's election. Merlyn Seller's ecogothic reading of Village focuses on stone, crystals and metal, arguing that apparently inert scenery contributes to horror and unsettles distinctions between living and non-living matter.

Repeated routines and familiar media have been examined as sources of unease. Philip J. Reed describes the door transitions as a source of anticipation, since the player does not know whether the next room will contain enemies or a place to save. Joel Couture of Dread Central argued that the interrupted door transition in Resident Evil 2 worked because earlier loading screens had taught him to regard them as safe. Reed compares the accumulation of short documents to epistolary fiction, particularly Dracula. Ewan Kirkland treats representations of photography, maps, television and radio as instances of remediation: digital games reproduce older media and their associations with horror and the supernatural to establish a sense of reality and embodiment.

Charley Reed analysed the original game using schema theory and expectancy violations theory to explain how the game produce fear through its depiction of the four forms of corruption: media, nature, architecture and authority. Philip J. Reed interprets the move from the mansion to the laboratory as a revelation that the creatures are products of deliberate human experimentation. Freya Fenton identifies the origins and escape of the viruses as a narrative thread connecting the franchise's genetic engineering and industrial sabotage plots. Tanya Carinae Pell Jones associates the franchise with a shift from supernatural to scientific explanations of zombies.

Paweł Baran examines Resident Evil 4 and its remake as forms of interactive body horror. He argues that transformations require players to change tactics: a headshot can release a stronger parasite, while mutated bosses have weak points that must be identified in their altered anatomy. He describes these encounters as puzzles conducted under pressure.

== Bibliography ==
- Capcom (2006). Resident Evil Archives: Umbrella's Virus Uncovered. BradyGames. ISBN 0-7440-0655-4.
- Fenton, Freya (2026). "Infernal Science: The Viruses of Resident Evil". In Bacon, Simon (ed.). The Palgrave Handbook of the Zombie. Cham: Palgrave Macmillan. pp. 1083–1096. doi:10.1007/978-3-032-05696-2_68.
- Jones, Tanya Carinae Pell (2014). "From Necromancy to the Necrotrophic: Resident Evil's Influence on the Zombie Origin Shift from Supernatural to Science". In Farghaly, Nadine (ed.). Unraveling Resident Evil: Essays on the Complex Universe of the Games and Films. Jefferson, North Carolina: McFarland & Company. pp. 7–18. ISBN 978-0-7864-7291-8.
- Perron, Bernard (2017). "Zombie Escape and Survival Plans: Mapping the Transmedial World of the Dead". In Boni, Marta (ed.). World Building: Transmedia, Fans, Industries. Amsterdam University Press. pp. 215–230. doi:10.5117/9789089647566/ch12.
- Reed, Philip J. (2020). Resident Evil. Los Angeles: Boss Fight Books. ISBN 978-1-940535-25-8.
- Seller, Merlyn (2024). "Biolithic Horror: Stone Victim/Victimisers in Resident Evil Village". In Hoedt, Madelon; Lukić, Marko (eds.). Re-Imagining the Victim in Post-1970s Horror Media. Amsterdam University Press. pp. 191–212. ISBN 9789463729963.
