= Save Room =

Save Room may refer to:

- "Save Room" (song), a 2006 single by John Legend
- Save Room – Organization Puzzle, a 2022 puzzle video game
