= Resident Evil (2026 film) =

Film by Zach Cregger

- Theatrical release poster
- Directed by: Zach Cregger
- Written by: Zach Cregger; Shay Hatten
- Based on: Resident Evil by Capcom
- Produced by: Robert Kulzer; Zach Cregger; Roy Lee; Miri Yoon; Victor Hadida; Asad Qizilbash; Carter Swan
- Starring: Austin Abrams; Zach Cherry; Kali Reis; Paul Walter Hauser
- Cinematography: Dariusz Wolski
- Edited by: Joe Murphy
- Music by: Ryan Holladay; Hays Holladay
- Production companies: Columbia Pictures (Note: Columbia Pictures' sister studio, TriStar Pictures, receives associate credit); Constantin Film; Davis Films; Subconscious; Vertigo Entertainment; PlayStation Productions
- Distributed by: Sony Pictures Releasing (Note: Excludes France (Metropolitan Filmexport) and Germany (Constantin Film))
- Release dates: September 15, 2026 (Los Angeles); September 18, 2026 (United States)
- Running time: 94 minutes
- Countries: United States; Germany; France
- Language: English
- Budget: $75 million
- Box office: $419.4 million

Resident Evil is a 2026 horror film directed by Zach Cregger and written by Cregger and Shay Hatten. It is the eighth live-action film in the Resident Evil film series, based on the video game series by Capcom. Austin Abrams stars as Bryan Hodukavich, a medical courier who must fight through an outbreak of infected monsters in Raccoon City. Zach Cherry, Kali Reis, and Paul Walter Hauser feature in supporting roles.

Constantin Film began planning a reboot of the Resident Evil film series in early 2022, following the failure of the previous reboot, Resident Evil: Welcome to Raccoon City (2021). Cregger was hired in January 2025, and Sony Interactive Entertainment's PlayStation Productions joined the production. Four studios, including Warner Bros. Pictures and Netflix, bid for the film rights, with Sony Pictures winning in March. Filming began in October 2025 in Prague and concluded in January 2026.

Resident Evil premiered in Los Angeles on September 15, 2026, and was theatrically released in the US on September 18 by Sony Pictures Releasing. The film received positive reviews from critics, and is the highest-rated film based on a video game on the review aggregators Rotten Tomatoes and Metacritic. It grossed $419.4 million worldwide on a $75 million budget, becoming Cregger's highest-grossing film and the highest-grossing Resident Evil film.

== Plot ==
Medical courier Bryan Hodukavich agrees to deliver a last-minute package to Raccoon City General Hospital in the Colorado mountains. While driving, he argues on the phone with his girlfriend, Michelle, about her recently discovered pregnancy. A woman steps into the road and Bryan hits her. With no mobile signal, Bryan tries to drive the woman to the hospital, but Deputy Sheriff Wilson pulls him over. Wilson places the woman in his cruiser and orders Bryan to follow. The cruiser crashes, killing Wilson. When Bryan tries to call for help on the cruiser's radio, the woman attacks him. He shoots her with Wilson's pistol, damaging his own car.

Bryan walks to a farm, where he encounters and kills a mutated dog. He enters the farmhouse and finds a shotgun. Searching for ammunition, he spots the injured woman approaching and is ambushed by her infected husband. He shoots them both, but tentacles emerge from their bodies, fusing them. Fleeing, Bryan enters a tunnel, but the exit is blocked by an RV. Inside, an infected girl mutates and bites him before he kills her. Outside the tunnel, Bryan is confronted by the infected couple, now an amalgamation of numerous bodies. He is saved by the Umbrella Corporation employees Paul and Maxine, who ward the creature off with gunfire.

As they drive Bryan into Raccoon City, Paul explains that Umbrella developed a substance for the US government capable of rapidly evolving organisms, and that a laboratory accident with the substance triggered the outbreak. Scientists at Umbrella's Raccoon City General Hospital laboratory need Bryan's package—a stabilizer—to develop a cure and hand it to the National Guard. In the city, Maxine is killed by a mutant and Paul is absorbed into the amalgam. The amalgam chases Bryan, who escapes into the sewers. He encounters an obese creature, whose stomach bursts open and releases mutant rats. Bryan shoots them and flees as their remains begin merging.

Near the hospital, infected people leap from rooftops and splatter around Bryan, who notices their remains show no sign of regenerating. Entering the hospital via the underground car park, he realizes his bite wound is worsening and records a tearful farewell message for Michelle. An Umbrella scientist spots him on a surveillance camera and directs him via intercom to take the stairwell to the top-floor laboratory. Exhausted, Bryan takes the elevator instead, fighting off an acid-vomiting mutant patient while the amalgam pursues him up the shaft. He forces the mutant to spray acid on the amalgam, wounding it. The amalgam flees, and Bryan kills the mutant.

Bryan navigates a maternity ward overrun with mutated newborns and staff, which chase him. He escapes onto a ruined skybridge and barricades the door. Bryan spots the amalgam climbing toward him. Using his last bullet, he shoots the barricade, causing the pursuing mutants to fall onto the amalgam. The creatures crash to the ground.

Bryan delivers the package to the laboratory. As the Umbrella scientists begin developing the cure, Bryan's infection takes hold and mutant appendages burst from his body. The appendages begin killing and consuming the scientists while Bryan desperately pleads for the cure. Bryan succumbs to the infection and kills the last scientist, sending the cure plummeting off the rooftop. Fully mutated, Bryan roars as National Guard helicopters arrive.

== Cast ==
- Austin Abrams as Bryan, a medical courier
- Zach Cherry as Carl, an Umbrella scientist
- Kali Reis as Maxine, an Umbrella enforcer
- Paul Walter Hauser as Paul, an Umbrella scientist
- Will Merrick as Dave, an Umbrella scientist
- Andrea Miltnerová as a pedestrian (Note: Her name is stated in-movie as Kathy Fenner.)
- Karel Dobrý as a farmer (Note: His name is stated in-movie as Daryl Fenner.)
- Zoé Bellas as Birdie, an Umbrella scientist
- Chris Lew Kum Hoi as Stanley, an Umbrella scientist
- Griffin Newman as Wade, an Umbrella scientist
- Jo Martin as Andrea Vasquez, a receptionist
- Emily Piggford as Dr. Maria Stokes
- Johnno Wilson as Wilson, an Arklay County sheriff

Additionally, Isla McRae plays the RV girl and James Beaumont portrays the surgeon. Sara Paxton (Cregger's real-life wife) voices Bryan's girlfriend Michelle. Shawn W. Loeser portrays the Puker, and Kellen Goff provides the creature vocalizations. Zach Cregger provides the voice on the hospital intercom.

== Production ==
=== Development ===
Johannes Roberts, the director of the previous film in the Resident Evil film series, Resident Evil: Welcome to Raccoon City (2021), expressed interest in directing a sequel. In April 2023, Raccoon HG Productions, which financed Welcome to Raccoon City, received a grant of CA$2 million from the Northern Ontario Heritage Fund Corporation for a film titled Resident Evil: The Umbrella Chronicles. Greater Sudbury was picked as the principal location.

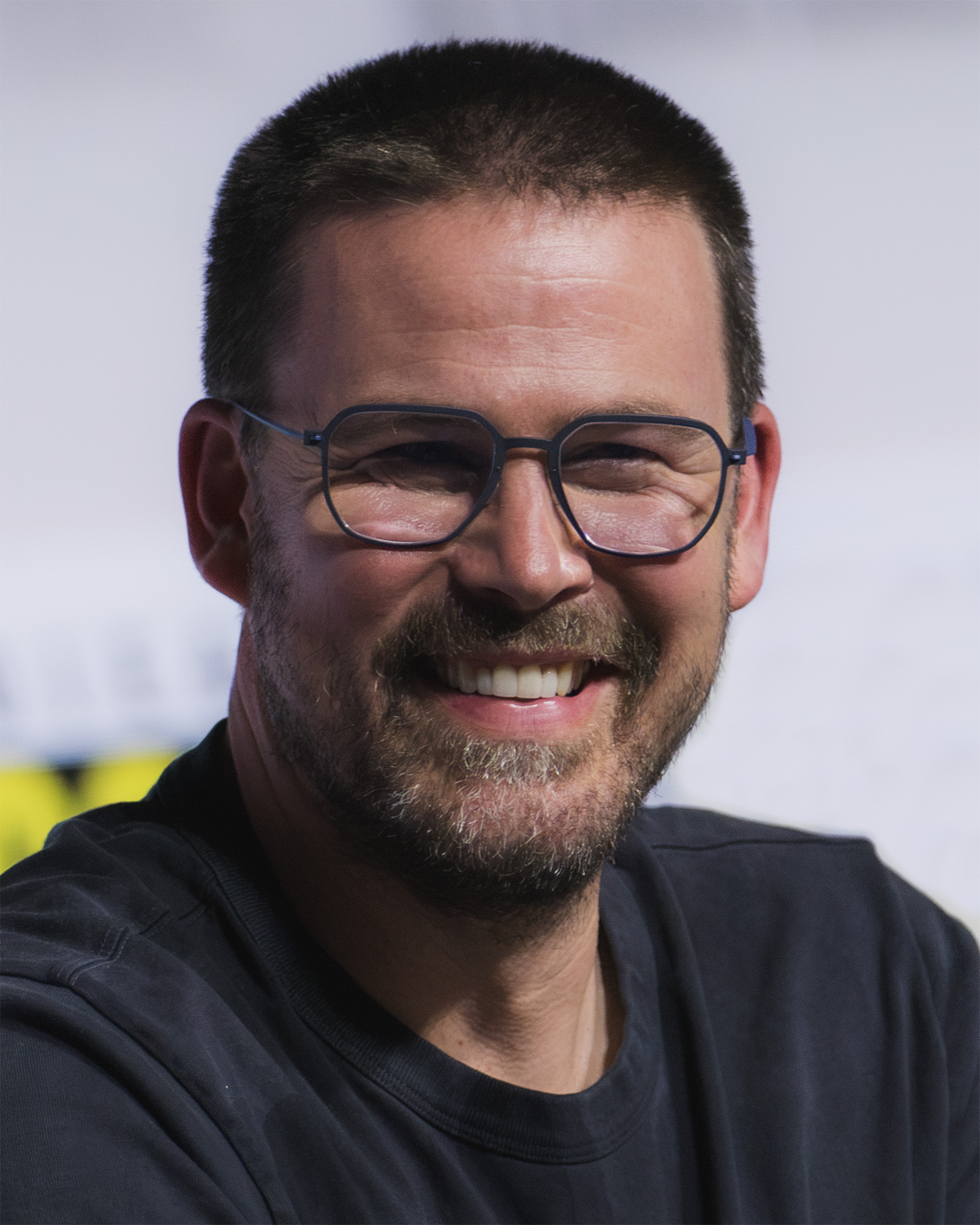
Zach Cregger was confirmed as the director and co-writer in January 2025.

In January 2025, it was announced Cregger would co-write and direct a Resident Evil film reboot. The rights holder, Constantin Film, co-financed and produced, alongside PlayStation Productions and Vertigo Entertainment. A bidding war between four major studios ensued for the distribution rights, including Warner Bros. Pictures and Netflix. In March 2025, it was revealed that Sony Pictures, which had co-produced the previous live-action films under their Screen Gems division, won the bidding war, and would have Columbia Pictures overseeing the production.

Cregger, a Resident Evil fan, described the film as a "love letter to the games". He chose not to feature any characters from the games, saying: "I'm not going to tell Leon's story, because Leon's story is told in the games. [Fans] already have that." He said the film would resemble Evil Dead II (1987) rather than his previous films Barbarian (2022) and Weapons (2025), and that it was a story he wanted to write whether he could use the Resident Evil IP or not. Cregger had not seen any of the previous Resident Evil films, and said his would be more closely based on the games, particularly Resident Evil 2 (1998), Resident Evil 3: Nemesis (1999), and Resident Evil 4 (2005). The story takes place concurrently with the events of the Raccoon City outbreak in Resident Evil 2, in an alternative timeline.

Cregger and the co-writer, Shay Hatten, decided that Resident Evil was about "the player experience, which is you're one person guiding a character. You're up against it." They tried to create a story that could translate "trying to stumble through navigating a crazy situation" in the journey of its protagonist. The plot resembles a playthrough in which the character begins with one gun, gains confidence and items to help the fight, and by the time things get worse in the third act was "doing it adeptly". Bryan serves as the audience surrogate, someone "who's over his head, realizes what the situation is, and just is doing his best to scramble his way out of it", not too competent and only managing to go through as "his survival instinct and desire to get home and see his girlfriend overcomes his natural fear". New characters would soon leave the story to keep the focus on Bryan's isolation and "the pure nightmare that he's in". Cregger said Bryan was based on himself, "Everything about him is me, my anxieties and my personality," Cregger told The Guardian.

The backstory of a pregnant girlfriend and Bryan's fear of parenthood was not meant to be prominent, but Cregger and Hatten realized many of the situations "speak to his psychological unreadiness to be a father and are reflecting his own situation back to him". Each would write a scene simultaneously while on a video call, then trade what they had finished. Hatten described the sessions as "two-hour spurts of concentrated energy" that helped make the script fun, which, like Cregger, he compared to Sam Raimi. Cregger said he cut as much of the jokes as possible after test audiences found it "too funny".

Cregger incorporated recurring mechanics and imagery from the games, including ammunition conservation, weapon progression and healing items. He wanted the audience to follow Bryan's dwindling supplies as he acquired more powerful firearms, and reproduced the appearance of healing items from Resident Evil 4. The film also includes green herbs, medical sprays and a typewriter, while exploration is impeded by locks requiring particular keys. Some sequences adopt a first-person perspective as Bryan searches rooms or examines weapons.

=== Casting ===
In March 2025, Austin Abrams was in talks to star, after having played a role in Cregger's previous film, Weapons. This was confirmed in July. It was rumored that Mikey Madison was in negotiations to star, but Cregger denied the rumor and said she was never considered. In September, Paul Walter Hauser joined the cast. In October, Zach Cherry, Kali Reis, and Johnno Wilson were announced to have also joined the cast, with Cherry as a scientist and Reis as an ex-military character that was originally written for a male actor.

=== Influences ===
Cregger has cited Evil Dead II (1987) and 1917 (2019) as influences for Resident Evil.

The characters that served as inspirations for Bryan were Marty McFly from Back to the Future (1985), John McClane from Die Hard (1988), and Kevin McCallister from Home Alone (1990).

A scene from Amat Escalante's film Los bastardos (2008) where a character shoots a woman in the head with a shotgun, inspired the scene in Resident Evil where Bryan shoots a female zombie in the head when she is running towards him. Cregger had to reshoot the scene to make sure that the gun, muzzle flash and resulting head explosion were visible simultaneously like in the scene he had seen in Los bastardos.

Cregger chose cinematographer Dariusz Wolski for admiring his work with dark visuals on films such as The Crow (1994) and Prometheus (2012).

=== Filming ===
Principal photography began in Prague on October 10, 2025, with Dariusz Wolski serving as cinematographer. Filming wrapped on January 22, 2026. The film was in the editing process by February 2026.

=== Music ===
The soundtrack was composed by Ryan and Hays Holladay, who previously co-scored Weapons with Cregger. The soundtrack album was released by Milan Records on September 18, 2026, the day of the film's release.

== Release ==
Resident Evil premiered at the United Theater on Broadway in Los Angeles on September 15, 2026, before premiering at the 21st Fantastic Fest on September 17, 2026. It was released in the U.S. on September 18, 2026, having been filmed for IMAX. Resident Evil was the second film to be released by both Columbia Pictures and TriStar Pictures after Lords of Dogstown in 2005.

Overseas, Sony opted for releasing Resident Evil a few weeks later in select Asian and African markets, with Thailand, the Commonwealth of Independent States, and South Africa opening on the following weekend from the American release, and Japan going on October 9.

=== Home media ===
Resident Evil was released digitally on November 3, 2026. and will be released on 4K, Blu-ray & DVD on December 29, 2026.

== Reception ==
=== Box office ===
As of November 22, 2026, Resident Evil has grossed $160.8 million in the United States and Canada, and $258.6 million in other territories, for a worldwide total of $419.4 million.

In the United States and Canada, Resident Evil made $8.8 million in Thursday previews, and earned $60 million there on its opening weekend along with $48.3 million from other territories, generating a total of $108.3 million debut at the global box office. It set the opening records for both the franchise (surpassing Resident Evil: Retribution and Resident Evil: The Final Chapter) and Cregger's career (surpassing Weapons). It fell 61% in its second weekend to $23.3 million, finishing second. In its third weekend, it made $8.3 million.

=== Critical response ===
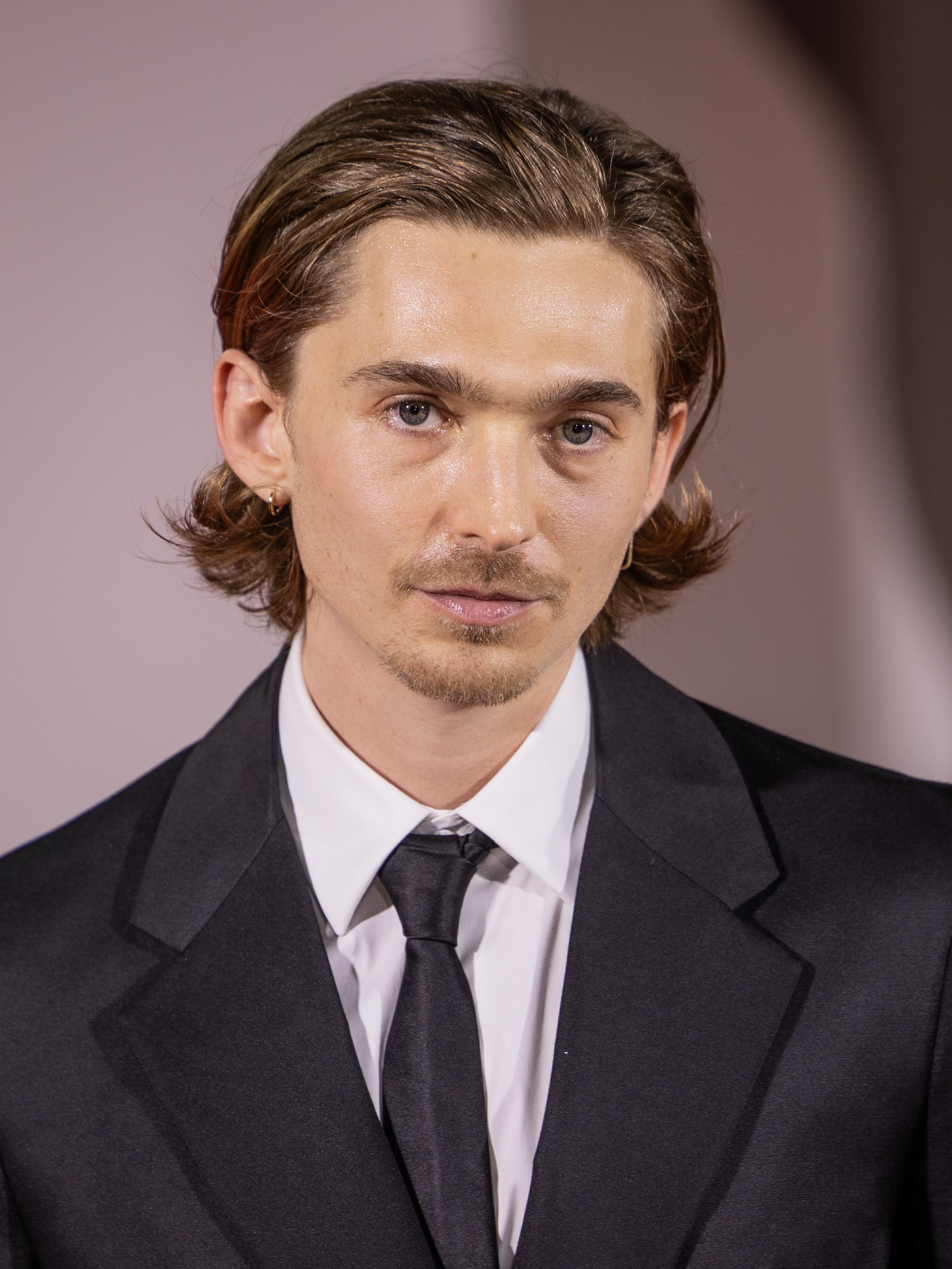
Austin Abrams was praised for his performance.

On the review aggregator website Rotten Tomatoes, 96% of 307 critics' reviews are positive, with an average rating of 7.8/10. The website's consensus reads: "Packing unforgettable scares into a sleek runtime while Austin Abrams' crack comedic timing provides crucial levity, Zach Cregger's Resident Evil is a propulsive tribute to the pleasure and terror of playing a truly spooky video game." Metacritic, which uses a weighted average, assigned it a score of 79 out of 100, based on 51 critics, indicating "generally favorable" reviews. It is both the best-reviewed film in the franchise and the highest-rated film based on a video game on Rotten Tomatoes and Metacritic, surpassing Exit 8. Audiences polled by CinemaScore gave it an average grade of "B+" on an A+ to F scale, the highest grade ever received for a Resident Evil film.

William Bibbiani of TheWrap praised Resident Evil as both an effective horror film and a video game adaptation, describing it as an "explosive horror experience" that captures the feeling of playing the games without adapting one of their stories. Bibbiani highlighted Austin Abrams' performance as Bryan, the survival-horror structure, and Cregger's combination of frightening and comedic elements, ultimately calling it Cregger's best film to date. Clarisse Loughrey of The Independent praised the approach to video game adaptation, describing it as a "funny, delirious" reboot that effectively recreated the experience of playing a Resident Evil game. Loughrey praised Cregger's handling of the survival-horror mechanics, the balance of horror and comedy, and Abrams' performance, while noting that it remained accessible to viewers unfamiliar with the games.

Jesse Hassenger of The Guardian praised Abrams' portrayal of Bryan, calling his performance "a particularly fresh point-of-view character for a zombie/monster movie" while praising the comedic elements and the character of Bryan as a whole. Donald Clarke of The Irish Times described Resident Evil as "hilarious, fast-moving, self-aware action romp", praising its gore, humor, and references to video game cliches. He called it "smallish in scale" and noted that it contained fewer story elements from the games than in the other films.

Jocelyn Noveck of the Associated Press praised Cregger's use of humor and gore and described Abrams as an appealing and relatable protagonist, while also highlighting the varied environments and jump scares. However, Noveck felt that the increasingly elaborate action became tiring toward the end. Phil de Semlyen of Time Out gave Resident Evil three out of five, praising Abrams' performance and the visual style, creature design, and faithfulness to the gameplay experience, but criticized its relatively slow pace and argued that it was more "goofy and good-looking" than frightening. He also felt that the plot was thin outside of its survival-horror set pieces.

=== Accolades ===
| Year | Ceremony | Category | Nominee | Result | Ref. |
|---|---|---|---|---|---|
| 2026 | 44th Golden Joystick Awards | Best Game Adaptation | Resident Evil | Nominated | |
| 2026 | The Game Awards 2026 | Best Adaptation | Resident Evil | Pending | |
