= Shigeru Chiba =

Japanese voice actor and narrator (born 1954)

- 千葉 繁
- Born: Masaharu Maeda; February 4, 1954 (age 72); Kikuchi, Kumamoto, Japan
- Occupations: Actor; voice actor; narrator; talent; sound director
- Years active: 1972–present
- Agent: 81 Produce
- Height: 166 cm (5 ft 5 in)

Masaharu Maeda (前田 正治, Maeda Masaharu; born February 4, 1954), known by the stage name Shigeru Chiba (千葉 繁, Chiba Shigeru), is a Japanese actor, voice actor, narrator, talent and sound director from Kikuchi, Kumamoto. He is affiliated with the talent management firm 81 Produce.

He is most known for the roles of Yoshihiro Kira from JoJo's Bizarre Adventure: Diamond Is Unbreakable, the narrator of Fist of the North Star, Megane from Urusei Yatsura, Rei Ichidō from High School! Kimengumi, Kazuma Kuwabara from YuYu Hakusho, Pilaf from Dragon Ball, Raditz and Garlic Jr. from Dragon Ball Z, Buggy the Clown from One Piece, Kefka Palazzo from Dissidia: Final Fantasy, and Kōichi Todome from Kerberos Saga.

He was also the voice acting mentor to Megumi Hayashibara.

== Career ==
Originally a stunt actor, Chiba also appeared in the Nikkatsu Roman Porno film series. He starred in the "Let's Make a Chiba Shigeru Promotion Film" project film Kurenai no Gankyō, as well as the Mamoru Oshii films Cerberus, Hell's Watchdog and Talking Head. He plays both serious and gag roles.

== Filmography ==
=== Anime ===
==== TV ====
- Gatchaman II (1978)
- The Rose of Versailles (1979)
- Space Carrier Blue Noah (1979) (Michirō Tamura)
- Astro Boy (1980) (Pilat)
- Space Runaway Ideon (1980) (Gantsu Parkingson)
- The Wonderful Adventures of Nils (1980) (Gusta)
- Dr. Slump (1981) (Tsun Tsukutsun, Niko-chan family servant, Time-kun, Donbe, Matsuyama)
- Ashita no Joe 2 (1981) (Mamoru Aoyama)
- Fang of the Sun Dougram (1981) (George Juldan)
- Urusei Yatsura (1981) (Megane)
- Miss Machiko (1981) (Kunio Yamagata)
- Magical Princess Minky Momo (1982) (Gajira)
- Armored Trooper Votoms (1983) (Vanilla Varta)
- Pāman (1983) (Sabu)
- Chikkun Takkun (1984) (Dr. Bell)
- Fist of the North Star (1984) (Narrator, Joker, Jakō, Kuro-Yasha, various characters)
- Magical Fairy Persia (1984) (Gera Gera)
- Kikōkai Garian (1984) (Red Windu)
- High School! Kimengumi (1985) (Rei Ichidō)
- Magical Star Magical Emi (1985) (Teranobu Kuniwake)
- Touch (1985) (Shingo Uesugi, Punch)
- Fire Tripper (1985) (Sukekichi)
- Area 88 (1985) (Escape Killer #1)
- Dragon Ball (1986) (Pilaf, Dolphin)
- Magical Idol Pastel Yumi (1986) (Kokkō)
- Maison Ikkoku (1986) (Yotsuya, Sōichirō-san (the dog))
- Saint Seiya (1986) (Spartan)
- Megazone 23 Part II (1986) (Lightning)
- Lupin III: The Plot of the Fuma Clan (1987) (Kazami)
- Dangaioh (1987) (Gil Burg)
- Original Dirty Pair OVA 5: Nobody Played There Anymore (1987) (Li)
- Hiatari Ryōkō! (1987) (Kenji Morimatsu, Shinichirō Ōta)
- The Three Musketeers Anime (1987) (Rochefort)
- Anpanman (1988) (Dr. Hiyari)
- Mashin Eiyūden Wataru (1988) (Death God)
- Osomatsu-kun (1988) (Honkan-san, Rerere no Oji-san, Nyarome)
- Sakigake!! Otokojuku (1988) (Onihige, Manjimaru)
- Alfred J. Kwak (1989) (Dolf)
- Dragon Ball Z (1989) (Raditz, Garlic Jr.)
- Jungle Emperor (1989) (Koko)
- Patlabor: The TV Series (1989) (Shigeo Shiba)
- Ranma ½ (1989) (Sasuke Sarugakure)
- Time Trouble Tondekeman (1989) (Tondekeman)
- Heisei Tensai Bakabon (1990) (Omawari-san, Rerere no Ojisan)
- Patlabor (1990) (Shigeo Shiba)
- Legend of the Galactic Heroes (1991) (E.J. Mackenzie)
- Kinnikuman: Scramble for the Throne (1991) (Kinniku Ataru, Kazuo Nakano)
- Marude Dameo (1991) (Sub-chan)
- Yokoyama Mitsuteru Sangokushi (1991) (Hua Xiong)
- Cooking Papa (1992) (Murakami-san)
- Salad Jūyūshi Tomatoman (1992) (Lord Kamakiri)
- YuYu Hakusho (1992) (Kazuma Kuwabara)
- Ai no Kusabi (1992) (Luke)
- Bastard! (1992) (Daiamon)
- Ghost Sweeper Mikami (1993) (Doctor Chaos)
- Ranma ½ series (1993–2008) (Sasuke)
- Omakase Scrappers (1994) (Nikkado, Jentoru)
- Tottemo! Luckyman (1994) (Doryoku Sugita, Doryokuman)
- Iria: Zeiram the Animation (1994) (Fujikuro)
- Kuma no Pūtarō (1995) (Babo-chan '95!! narration)
- Sailor Moon SuperS (1995) (Kurumiwario)
- Virtua Fighter (1995–1996) (Lau Chan, Narrator)
- Dragon Ball GT (1996) (Pilaf)
- Ultraman: Super Fighter Legend (1996) (Ace Killer and Kanegon)
- Ge Ge Ge no Kitaro (4th series) (1996) (Nezumi Otoko)
- Midori no Makibaō (1996) (Chū Hyōei)
- Violinist of Hameln (1996) (Oboe)
- Dokkiri Doctor (1998) (Hajime Mizukoshi)
- Serial Experiments Lain (1998) (Office Worker)
- Yu-Gi-Oh! (1998) (Kokurano)
- Lupin III: Da Capo of Love: Fujiko's Unlucky Days (1999) (Nazarov)
- Kamikaze Kaito Jeanne (1999) (Officer Tōdaiji)
- One Piece (1999) (Buggy the Clown)
- Rerere no Tensai Bakabon (1999) (Omawari-san, Rerere no Ojisan)
- Galaxy Angel (2001) (Mr. God)
- Psychic Academy (2002) (Boo Velka Receptor Arba)
- Bobobo-bo Bo-bobo (2003) (Hydrate)
- Zatch Bell! (2003) (Belgim E.O.)
- Beet the Vandel Buster (2004) (Merumondo)
- Black Jack (2004) (Doctor Ando)
- Bleach (2004) (Don Kanonji)
- Ojamajo Doremi Na-i-sho (2004) (Kazuya Yoshida's Father)
- The Law of Ueki (2005) (Gengorō Ueki)
- Inukami! (2006) (Kawarazaki Naoki)
- Kage Kara Mamoru! (2006) (Alien Captain)
- Spider Riders (2006) (Brutus)
- Dragon Ball Kai (2009) (Raditz, Grandpa Son Gohan)
- Panty & Stocking with Garterbelt (2010) (Corset)
- Nichijou (2011) (Soccer Ball)
- Gintama (2013) (Rotten Maizo)
- Space Battleship Yamato 2199 (2013) (Dr. Sakezō Sado, Ittetsu Katō)
- Magica Wars (2014) (Ebizō)
- Dragon Ball Super (2015) (Pilaf)
- Overlord (2015) (Sebas Tian (ep. 1-3, 5, 10, ))
- March Comes in like a Lion (2016-2018) (Someji Kawamoto)
- JoJo's Bizarre Adventure: Diamond Is Unbreakable (2016) (Yoshihiro Kira)
- Time Bokan 24 (2016) (Narrator)
- The Laughing Salesman NEW (2017) (Yosuke Uchinaki)
- Granblue Fantasy The Animation (2017) (Yodalrarha (ep. 12))
- Overlord II (2018) (Sebas Tian (eps. 6-13))
- Overlord III (2018) (Sebas Tian)
- Detective Conan (2018) (Kanenori Wakita)
- Kiratto Pri Chan (2018) (Kenzaburou Aoba (ep. 15))
- Baki (2018) (Kunimatsu (eps. 20-21))
- The Helpful Fox Senko-san (2019) (Mr. Tanukiman (eps. 3-4))
- Demon Slayer: Kimetsu no Yaiba (2019) (Jigoro Kuwajima)
- Natsunagu! (2020) (Shige Chiba)
- Listeners (2020) (Leo Marshall)
- Dorohedoro (2020-present) (Chidaruma)
- Jujutsu Kaisen (2020–present) (Jogo, Wasuke Itadori)
- Warlords of Sigrdrifa (2020) (Maintenance team leader)
- Hortensia Saga (2021) (Doctor Gref)
- The Heike Story (2021) (Emperor Go-Shirakawa)
- Boruto: Naruto Next Generations (2022) (Araumi Funato)
- Miss Kuroitsu from the Monster Development Department (2022) (Red-Caped General)
- Urusei Yatsura (2023) (Ryunosuke's father)
- High Card (2023) (Lucky Lunchman)
- Magical Destroyers (2023) (Chōgō-shi)
- Hyakushō Kizoku (2023) (Oyaji-dono)
- The 100 Girlfriends Who Really, Really, Really, Really, Really Love You (2023) (God of Love)
- A Playthrough of a Certain Dude's VRMMO Life (2023) (Black)
- Tales of Wedding Rings (2024) (Alabaster)
- Rurouni Kenshin: Kyoto Disturbance (2024) (Nenji Kashiwazaki/Okina)
- Beastars Final Season (2024) (Gosha)
- I'm Living with an Otaku NEET Kunoichi!? (2025) (Narrator)
- Farmagia (2025) (Dentro)
- Clevatess (2025) (Broco)
- Night of the Living Cat (2025) (Narrator)
- Let's Go Kaikigumi (2026) (Narrator)
- Maō no Musume wa Yasashi Sugiru!! (2026) (Narrator)
- Daemons of the Shadow Realm (2026) (Long Legs)
- The Ghost in the Shell (2026) (Director Nakamura)

==== Original net animation ====
- Tokyo Override (2024) (Yukio)
- Yu-Gi-Oh! Card Game The Chronicles (2026) (Gabonga)

==== Film ====
- Urusei Yatsura series (1983-1991) (Megane)
- Doraemon: Nobita's Great Adventure into the Underworld (1984) (Errand Demon)
- High School! Kimengumi (1986) (Rei Ichidō)
- Super Mario Bros.: The Great Mission to Rescue Princess Peach! (1986) (Kibidango)
- Dragon Ball: Mystical Adventure (1988) (Pilaf)
- Maison Ikkoku Kanketsuhen (1988) (Yotsuya, Soichiro-san (the dog))
- My Neighbor Totoro (1988) (Kusakari-Otoko/ Mowing Man)
- Dragon Ball Z: Dead Zone (1989) (Nicky)
- Patlabor: The Movie (1989) (Shigeo Shiba)
- Yu Yu Hakusho: The Movie (1993) (Kazuma Kuwabara)
- Yu Yu Hakusho: Chapter of Underworld's Carnage - Bonds of Fire (1994) (Kazuma Kuwabara)
- Patlabor 2: The Movie (1993) (Shigeo Shiba)
- Ghost Sweeper Mikami (1994) (Doctor Chaos)
- Ghost in the Shell (1995) (Janitor)
- Mahojin Guru Guru (1996) (Hatton)
- Metropolis (2001) (Acetylene Lamp)
- Konjiki no Gash Bell!!: 101-Banme no Mamono (2004) (Mop Demon)
- Konjiki no Gash Bell!! Movie 2: Attack of the Mecha-Vulcan (2005) (Dr. M2)
- Doraemon: Nobita's Secret Gadget Museum (2013) (Dr. Pepura)
- Dragon Ball Z: Battle of Gods (2013) (Pilaf)
- Space Battleship Yamato 2199: Odyssey of the Celestial Ark (2014) (Dr. Sakezō Sado)
- Dragon Ball Z: Resurrection 'F' (2015) (Pilaf)
- Human Lost (2019) (Shige)
- Me & Roboco (2025) (Roboco)
- Demon Slayer: Kimetsu no Yaiba – The Movie: Infinity Castle (2025) (Jigoro Kuwajima)
- Whoever Steals This Book (2025) (Junichirō Kaname)
- Patlabor EZY: File 1 (2026) (Shigeo Shiba)

=== Video games ===
Year	Title	Role	Console	Source
1986	Hokuto no Ken	pachinko slots, in-game results message narration		
1989	Tengai Makyou	Mantō, Kikugorō		
1989–2005	Patlabor series	Shigeo Shiba		
1992	Dōkyūsei	Kantarō		
1993	Hebereke's Popoon	Jennifer		
1994	Popful Mail	Gau	Mega CD	
1994	Virtua Fighter 2	Lau Chan		
1996	Puyo Puyo CD 2	Skeleton T, Sasoriman		
1998	Brave Fencer Musashi	Fores		
1998	Puyo Puyo CD	Skeleton T, Sasoriman		
1998	Sakura Wars 2: Thou Shalt Not Die	Chibasuke		
1999	Syphon Filter	Gabe Logan	PlayStation	
1999	Transformers: Beast Wars Transmetals	Megatron		
2000	Menkyo o Torou	Eikichi Fuchizawa		
2001	Virtua Fighter 4	Lau Chan		
2001	One Piece - Grand Battle	Buggy the Clown		
2002	Spider-Man	Narrator		
2002	Bomberman World	Earth Bomber		
2002	Super Robot Wars Impact	Gil Berg		
2004	Shadow Hearts: Covenant	Guran Gama		
2004	Kinnikuman Muscle Generations	Kinniku Ataru		
2005	CR Hokuto no Ken Denshō series	Kinniku Ataru	pachinko, in-game results message narration	
2006	Kinnikuman Muscle Grand Prix Max			
2007	Uncharted: Drake's Fortune	Victor Sullivan		
2008	Dissidia: Final Fantasy	Kefka Palazzo		
2009	Soulcalibur: Broken Destiny	Geo Dampierre		
2009	Uncharted 2: Among Thieves	Victor Sullivan		
2010	Resonance of Fate	Gelsey		
2011	Final Fantasy Type-0	Provost		
2011	Uncharted 3: Drake's Deception	Victor Sullivan		
2011	Dissidia Duodecim	Kefka Palazzo		
2012	Soulcalibur V	Geo "Le Bello" Dampierre		
2012	Uncharted: Golden Abyss	Victor Sullivan		
2012	CR Tensai Bakabon	pachinko, Motomiya-san		
2013	JoJo's Bizarre Adventure: All Star Battle	Iggy		
2013	Zyuden Sentai Kyoryuger: Game on Gaburincho!!	Kyoryuger Equipment		
2013–present	Pokémon series (XY - Present)	Nidoking and Tyranitar		
2014	Granblue Fantasy	Yodarha, F.A.N.G.		
2015	Lego Dimensions	Master Chen		
2016	Street Fighter V	F.A.N.G.		
2016	World of Final Fantasy	Saboten Conductor		
2016	Uncharted 4: A Thief's End	Victor Sullivan		
2017	Nioh	Hisahide Matsunaga		
2017	Xenoblade Chronicles 2	Azurda		
2018	Kirby Star Allies	Hyness		
2019	Kingdom Hearts III	Vexen		
2020	Nioh 2	Hisahide Matsunaga		
2020	Final Fantasy VII Remake	Professor Hojo		
2021	Famicom Detective Club: The Missing Heir	Myoujin Station Clerk		
2021	MONARK	Vanitas		
2021	Super Smash Bros. Ultimate	Azurda		
2022	Fate/Grand Order	Zhang Jiao		
2022	Xenoblade Chronicles 3	Gray		
2022	GetAmped2	Master Saga		
2022	Fitness Boxing: Fist of the North Star	Narrator		
2022	Crisis Core: Final Fantasy VII Reunion	Professor Hojo		
2023	Granblue Fantasy: Relink	Yodarha		
2023	Resident Evil 4	The Merchant		
2023	Bayonetta Origins: Cereza and the Lost Demon	Púca		
2023	Crymachina	Litheia		
2023	Ys X: Nordics	Nameless Old Man		
2024	Jujutsu Kaisen: Cursed Clash	Jogo		
2024	Final Fantasy VII Rebirth	Professor Hojo		
2024	Reynatis	Shinzaburou Kiyokawa		
2026	Guilty Gear Strive	Robo-Ky		
Unknown	Virtua Fighter series	Lau Chan		
Unknown	CR Tensai Bakabon 2	pachinko, Motomiya-san		
Unknown	CR Rerere ni Omakase	pachinko, Motomiya-san		

=== Live action ===
- Nikkatsu Roman Porno (1971-1988?)
- Shiroi Kyotō (TV drama in 1978)
- The Red Spectacles (1987) (Kōichi Todome)
- StrayDog: Kerberos Panzer Cops (1991) (Kōichi Todome)
- Talking Head (1992) (I)
- Sakigake!! Otokojuku Live-action film (2007) (Narration (Minmei Publishing)/Voice on loud speaker)
- The Next Generation -Patlabor- (2014–15) (Shigeo Shiba)
- Kurenai no Gankyō
- Shin Abarenbō Shōgun (2025) (Narrator)

==== Tokusatsu ====
- Mirrorman (Invader) (1971-1972)
- Dinosaur Corps Koseidon (Research Worker of the Time-Space Administration Bureau (Actor))
- Mysterious girl Nile Thutmose (Geek Demon) (1978-1979)
- X-Bomber (Bongo Heracles) (1980-1981)
- Singing Great Ryūgū-jō (Bad Noodles) (1992)
- Gosei Sentai Dairanger (Kabuki Novice (ep. 13 - 14)) (1993)
- Yūgen Jikkō Three Sisters Shushutorian (Vending Machine) (ep. 21)) (1993)
- Ninja Sentai Kakuranger (Chōchinkozō (ep. 41)) (1994)
- Juukou B-Fighter (Schwartz) (1995-1996)
- B-Robo Kabutack (Sharkler) (1997-1998)
- Kaizoku Sentai Gokaiger (Sneak Brother Elder (ep. 8)) (2011)
- Kamen Rider × Super Sentai × Space Sheriff: Super Hero Taisen Z (Kyoryuger Equipment) (2013)
- Zyuden Sentai Kyoryuger: Gaburincho of Music (Narration, voice of Kyoryuger Equipment) (2013)
- Zyuden Sentai Kyoryuger (Dr. Ulshade (Actor)/Kyoryu Violet (Voice), Narration, Kyoryuger Equipment) (2013-2014)
- Zyuden Sentai Kyoryuger vs. Go-Busters: The Great Dinosaur Battle! Farewell Our Eternal Friends (Kyoryuger Equipment) (2014)
- Ultraman X (Hayato's Father) (2015-2016)

=== Radio ===
- Hamidashi Kanezawa Ōkoku
- Ōji Hiroi no Multi Tengoku

=== Dubbing ===
==== Live-action ====
Original year	Dub year	Title	Role	Original actor	Notes
1916	2014	The Rink	A Waiter	Charlie Chaplin	
1917	2014	The Cure	The Inebriate	Charlie Chaplin	
1961	1979	West Side Story	Joyboy	Robert Banas	
1971		The Tales of Beatrix Potter	Johnny Townmouse	Ketih Martin	
1977	1982	Star Wars	Wedge Antilles	Denis Lawson	
1980	1980	The Empire Strikes Back	Wedge Antilles	Denis Lawson	
1982	2010	The Dark Crystal	skekTek / The Scientist	Steve Whitmire	
1983		Fantasy Mission Force	Old Sun	Sun Yueh	
1985	2020	Day of the Dead	William McDermott	Jarlath Conroy	
1986	1992	The Wraith	Skank	David Sherrill	
1989		Ghostbusters II	Janosz Poha	Peter MacNicol	
1993		Super Mario Bros.	Spike	Richard Edson	
2006		Let's Go to Prison	Nelson Biederman IV	Will Arnett	
2010		Vampires Suck	Daro	Ken Jeong	
2013		Pacific Rim	Ops Tendo Choi	Clifton Collins Jr.	
2015		Mad Max: Fury Road	The Bullet Farmer	Richard Carter	
2018		Peter Rabbit	J.W. Rooster II	Will Reichelt	
2021		Peter Rabbit 2: The Runaway	J.W. Rooster II	Will Reichelt	
2021		Tom & Jerry	Jackie	Ken Jeong	
2022		The Batman	Carmine Falcone	John Turturro	
2022		Thor: Love and Thunder	Zeus	Russell Crowe	
2022		Uncharted	The Scotsman	Steven Waddington	
2024		Furiosa: A Mad Max Saga	The Bullet Farmer	Lee Perry	
2024		Kingdom of the Planet of the Apes	Trevathan	William H. Macy	
2025		Superman	Vasil Ghurkos	Zlatko Burić	

==== Animation ====
Original year	Dub year	Title	Role	Notes
1970		The Aristocats	Shun Gon	
1984–1991		The Real Ghostbusters	Peter Venkman	
1992		Aladdin	Bekiet	
1992–1993		The Adventures of T-Rex	Little Boss, Big Boss	
1994		The Return of Jafar	Bekiet	
1994		X-Men: The Animated Series	Beast	
1994–1997		Aaahh!!! Real Monsters	Chimera	
1996		Aladdin and the King of Thieves	Bekiet	
1996–1999		Beast Wars: Transformers	Megatron	
1999–2000		Beast Machines: Transformers	Megatron	
2010–2019		My Little Pony: Friendship Is Magic	Discord	
2013		Epic	Professor Bomba	
2024		The Wild Robot	Longneck	
2026		Gameoverse	Fold	

=== Other ===
- Star Tours (Dak Ralter) (1987)
- The Amazing Adventures of Spider-Man the Ride (Hobgoblin) (1999)
- Magic Lamp Theater (Bekiet) (2001)
- SD Gundam Gashapon Wars (Narration (commercial)) (2005)

== CD ==
- Inferious Wakusei Senshi Gaiden Condition Green (Jasu Tamigan) (1990)
- Roman Club (Udo Ayanokōji) (1996)
- Yūkyū Gensōkyoku 2nd Album Drama CD: ensemble vol.1 (Marshall) (1998)
- Aria (Old Postal Worker) (2005-2006)
- Setō no Hanayome (Izumi) (2007)
- Strange+ (Narrator, α) (2008)

== Live Theatre ==
- Sakura Taisen Kayō Show: Shin-pen Hakkenden (2002)
- Burstman Live (performer, producer)

== Other work ==
- Tensai TV-kun: Mystery no Yakata (Count Brain Buster) (1993-1997)
- Tensai TV-kun:Tensai TV-kun Wide (TK-kun) (1999)
- Okā-san to Issho (Spoo and Gatarat) (Gatarat) (1999-2000)
- Tensai TV-kun MAX: Mystery no Yakata (Miracle Man) (2006-2007, 2010)

== Sound effects director ==
=== Anime television ===
- Delightful Moomin Family: Adventure Diary (1991)
- Kuma no Pūtarō (1995)
- Haunted Junction (1997)
- Yoiko (1998)
- Hoshin Engi (1999)
- Sister Princess (2001)
- Tantei Shounen Kageman (2001)
- Sister Princess: RePure (2002)
- Grandpa Danger (2004)
- Kirarin Revolution (2006)

=== Anime OVA ===
- Devilman Tanjōhen (1987)
- Gosenzo-sama Banbanzai! (1989)
- Go Nagai World (1991)
- Kyūkyoku Chōjin R (1991)
- Twin Signal (1995)
- Tattoon Master (1996)
- Amazing Nurse Nanako (1999)
- Memories Off (2001)
- Bizarre Cage (2003)
- Memories Off 2nd (2003)
- Guardian Hearts (2003)
- Memories Off 3.5 (2004)
- Guardian Hearts Power Up! (2005)

=== Video games ===
- Blue Breaker: Ken yori mo Bishō wo (PC-FX) (1997)

=== Live action movies ===
- Talking Head - Rei Maruwa (1992)
