= Save Room – Organization Puzzle =

Save Room
- Developer: Fractal Projects
- Publishers: Fractal Projects; Ratalaika Games (PS4, PS5, XBO, XSX, NS)
- Platforms: Windows, Linux, PlayStation 4, PlayStation 5, Xbox One, Xbox Series X/S, Nintendo Switch
- Release: April 28, 2022 (PC); November 11, 2022 (PS4, PS5, XBO, XSX, NS)
- Genre: Puzzle game
- Mode: Single-player

Save Room – Organization Puzzle is a puzzle video game developed and published by Fractal Projects. It was released on April 28, 2022, for Windows and simply as Save Room on November 11, 2022, for PlayStation 4, PlayStation 5, Xbox One, Xbox Series X/S, and Nintendo Switch, where it was published by Ratalaika Games. The game simulates survival horror inventory management in the manner of Resident Evil 4, giving players situations in which they need to fit certain items within their briefcase. Players may remove items already in the briefcase by combining them, using them to heal their health, or reloading their guns. The game was praised by critics for its low price and attention to detail, but was criticized for its simplicity and short length.

== Gameplay ==
Initially, the game starts out minimalistic, making the player rotate and snap items into place to fill up their briefcase. Eventually, it introduces new mechanics, such as eating rotten food to damage one's health in order to be able to use up healing items to heal it back, and loading ammunition into guns, with some ammo fitting multiple guns of the same type.

== Reception ==
Save Room's Switch version was rated 5/10 stars by Roland Ingram of Nintendo Life, who called the game "hard to recommend" due to its slightly higher price compared to Steam. Saying it "took us an hour and a bit" to complete the game, he described the credits as humorous due to being a simple list of graphical asset sources. He characterized the game as "extremely easy" with few new ideas.

Cass Marshall of Polygon described Save Room as "having some fun puzzles", calling it "a love letter to Resident Evil 4's attache case", and recommending it to those who loved creating an efficient loadout. Isaiah Colbert of Kotaku praised the game for including engaging details rather than just coasting "on its inspired concept", including music reminiscient of Resident Evil save rooms and "chunky" sound effects. Christopher Livingston of PC Gamer called the game "pretty great", saying its background music was "excellent".

== Sequel ==
In 2023, the game's developers announced a sequel, Save Room – The Merchant, for Windows. It introduces the additional element of an in-game shop run by a gender flipped version of the Merchant from Resident Evil 4, letting the player buy and sell items in more difficult puzzles.
