= Merchant (Resident Evil) =

- Resident Evil character
- The Merchant in Resident Evil 4 (2023)
- First appearance: Resident Evil 4 (2005)
- Created by: Masaki Yamanaka
- Voiced by: Original; Paul Mercier; Remake: EN:: Michael Adamthwaite; JA:: Shigeru Chiba

The Merchant is a character in the Resident Evil survival horror video game series created by the Japanese company Capcom. Introduced in the 2005 video game Resident Evil 4 and returning for its 2023 remake, he acts as an NPC who sells weapons and other items, he assists Leon S. Kennedy in his mission to rescue Ashley Graham from the evil cult Los Illuminados. A mysterious man with glowing eyes wearing a hooded black trench coat lined with weapons and a purple bandanna that hides most of his face, he is seemingly allowed to pass unhindered by the game's enemies, the Ganados.

Critics have called the Merchant an iconic character in the series, as well as one of the most recognizable video game NPCs ever, due to his unique appearance and often-repeated lines, including "What're ya buyin'?" Reception to the character has been positive, citing his good-naturedness in the face of adversity. In the original game, he is played by voice actor Paul Mercier, who also voiced Leon, while in the remake, he was voiced by Shigeru Chiba in Japanese and Michael Adamthwaite in English.

== Concept and design ==
Neptuneman's cloak from Kinnikuman influenced his design.

The Merchant was one of several characters created by artist Masaki Yamanaka for the game Resident Evil 4, in a design process he called "unique" due to the lack of restrictions on scenario or setting, and only basic guidelines to follow. The Merchant, who goes nameless besides his title, was created late in Resident Evil 4's development, and is meant to be the living embodiment of his shop. By doing this they were able to place a shop anywhere in the game's world.

His hooded black trench coat, which holds a majority of his items in its interior, was inspired by the cloak worn by Kinnikuman series character Neptuneman. Neptuneman was a villain who adorned his cloak with masks stolen from defeated fighters, something that shocked Yamanaka as a child. The Merchant covers half of his face with a purple bandana, and carries a large tan rucksack. His eyes glow similarly to antagonists infected by the mind-controlling Las Plagas parasites (the Ganados); however, he is completely non-hostile, and, according to Resident Evil 4 Digital Archives will "do business with anyone as long as the price is right". When the character was brought back in Resident Evil 4 remake, he received minimal changes to his design.

Several unused concepts related or similar to the character also exist, such as another Merchant in Resident Evil 5 that would have run a stationary shop through a barred door. In the artbook for Resident Evil 6, the Merchant was considered as part of an unused alternate costume for series character Leon Kennedy, with him in a sitting position and strapped to his back. This version of the character was shown to be notably shorter, wearing yellow gloves and boots with his coat held open, while Leon's outfit resembled his default Resident Evil 4 attire. The design was ultimately cut due to how many technical issues arose from trying to implement it.

== Appearances ==
The Merchant was first introduced in the 2005 video game, Resident Evil 4 as one of the few non-hostile characters protagonist Leon encounters. First appearing at a window, the Merchant speaks in a pseudo-Australian accent and encourages Leon to follow him behind the building where Leon will find him standing near a flaming sconce. Once approached, the Merchant opens one side of his coat to reveal a vast assortment of ammunition and firearms, encouraging Leon to purchase from him with phrases such as "What're ya buyin'?" Afterwards the Merchant will re-appear at various points throughout the game, the locations marked by similar sconces. He sells weapons and items and purchases valuable antiques and gems that Leon discovers for pesetas. He also rewards Leon prizes for good marksmanship using his shooting range as well as shooting blue medallions scattered throughout the game's levels. The Merchant instantly dies if harmed in any way, but will still appear at any of his other locations in the game.

When Resident Evil 4 was remade in 2023 the character returned, but with some changes. He now cannot be harmed or killed, and any attempts by the player to aim at him will cause Leon to lower his gun. The Merchant now also provides quests for Leon to do. Additional characterization was provided, with the medallions now described as religious charms hung up by game's villains that the Merchant wishes to destroy, and he has an array of new dialogue. However, some instances, such as the Merchant becoming impatient if his shop is browsed for too long proved divisive to fans, and resulted in a mod called "Patient Merchant" to remove the extra lines. In the remake, the Merchant has been described as having a Cockney accent.

Outside of Resident Evil 4, the Merchant also appears in GungHo Online Entertainment's mobile game TEPPEN, a card-based battling game featuring various Capcom franchise characters. In this title he acts as an in-game vendor, the weapons and ammo in his coat replaced with compact discs. In printed trading card media, he appears in the Bandai produced game Resident Evil: The Deck Building Game. The 2020 video game Resident Evil: Resistance includes a "spray" cosmetic item players can apply walls featuring the game's raccoon mascot cosplaying as the Merchant. In Resident Evil Village, the Duke, a character that serves a similar function as the Merchant within the game, will sometimes say one of the character's introduction lines complete with a faux accent, and then laughingly mention it was something "an old friend of mine used to say". In 2025, he also appears in a mobile game Resident Evil Survival Unit.

== Promotion and reception ==
In 2006, Augusta Entertainment released a series of figures for Resident Evil 4, which included a figure for the Merchant. The stationary figure was packaged with chewing gum, and was based on his concept art appearance. The company Numskull later released a collectible cosplaying duck as the character as part of their "TUBBZ" line for the Resident Evil series.

Critical reception of the Merchant has been positive, calling him both memorable and helpful despite his menacing appearance. In 2006, Nintendo Power described the Merchant's quote as "permanently ingrained in the gaming lexicon" despite not placing on the Best New Characters list. Zack Zwiezen of Kotaku referred to him as "the real star" of the original 2005 game, calling him "chill and focused on business" despite possibly being infected with the Plaga parasite. Describing the Merchant as a "man of no allegiance" who may also be selling the villagers their weapons, he lamented the fact that the Merchant had not yet appeared in other Resident Evil titles, citing the Merchant character in Resident Evil: Degeneration as a "copy" and not the "real deal". Comparing the Merchant to the Duke, he called the Merchant slightly more mysterious, but said that the Duke provided better services, such as cooking. He cited the Merchant returning after the player killed him as evidence he had "multiple clones". Alan Wheeler of IGN called Merchant as the most iconic NPC ever. After the release of the remake of Resident Evil 4, fans wanted a Merchant type character in the possible Resident Evil 5 remake. Wireframe described him as "genuinely bizarre" due to how out of place he felt in the world, but praised that aspect at the same time, calling him "utterly fantastic, and a constant reminder that the game he's in isn't entirely serious and should be played with a big old smile on your face."

Max Scoville of IGN called the Merchant absurd, but also stated that the character exemplified the game's great aspects. Saying that he has "all the subtle salesmanship of a crack dealer in a 1980s anti-drug PSA", he characterized the Merchant as both menacing and goofy. Scoville described the Merchant's design as combining "fantasy RPG" aesthetics with "slick futuristic stuff", the player's view of the character changing when he opens his coat to reveal the weapons he has for sale. Commenting on the Merchant's unusual penchant for buying antiques in exchange for weapons, Scoville states that the game "flaunts" its ludonarrative dissonance rather than trying to hide it. Mentioning a fan theory that the Merchant might be multiple individuals who dress and speak the same way, Scoville said that it only made the Merchant more ridiculous if true, like a "scary mall Santa". Nick Bunce of Eurogamer stated that the Merchant's signature "Whaddya buyin'?" line was "eternally etched into [his] psyche", calling the character a "walking enigma". Saying that despite the Merchant's glowing eyes, he was seemingly unaffected by the mind-controlling Plaga parasite, Bunce described him as a "well-stocked ally" who "brought a unique warmth" to the hostile environment around him, claiming that his voice created "a neural connection" that meant both safety and a material advantage. Bunce said he was "bitterly disappointed" that the Merchant's original voice actor did not reprise his role in the remake.

The Merchant appeared in a skit by parody group Mega64, who acted as him towards unassuming passerby while wearing a cosplay of the character. Another parody featuring the Merchant allows players to take the role of Ashley and date him alongside other characters in the format of an otome game. In 2023, indie game developer Fractal Projects announced Save Room – The Merchant, a sequel to their Save Room item management video game that adds a female character inspired by the Merchant.
