= Resident Evil 4 =

2005 video game

- North American GameCube cover art
- Developer: Capcom Production Studio 4 (Note: Original Windows version developed by Sourcenext; Oculus Quest 2 version developed by Armature Studio.)
- Publishers: Capcom: Windows; JP: Capcom; NA/PAL: Ubisoft; WW: Capcom (HD); Oculus Quest 2; WW: Oculus Studios
- Director: Shinji Mikami
- Producer: Hiroyuki Kobayashi
- Designers: Hiroshi Shibata; Kouji Kakae; Shigenori Nishikawa
- Programmer: Kiyohiko Sakata
- Writer: Shinji Mikami
- Composers: Misao Senbongi; Shusaku Uchiyama
- Series: Resident Evil
- Platforms: GameCube: PlayStation 2; Windows; Wii; iOS; Zeebo; PlayStation 3; Xbox 360; Android; PlayStation 4; Xbox One; Nintendo Switch; Oculus Quest 2
- Release: January 11, 2005: GameCube; NA: January 11, 2005; JP: January 27, 2005; PAL: March 18, 2005; PlayStation 2; NA: October 25, 2005; EU: November 4, 2005; AU: November 9, 2005; JP: December 1, 2005; Windows; AU: March 1, 2007; EU: March 2, 2007; NA: May 15, 2007; JP: June 7, 2007; WW: February 27, 2014 (HD); Wii; JP: May 31, 2007; NA: June 19, 2007; EU: June 29, 2007; AU: July 5, 2007; iOS; NA: July 27, 2009; JP: July 28, 2009; NA: April 3, 2010 (iPad); JP: May 21, 2010 (iPad); Zeebo; BR: August 11, 2009; PlayStation 3, Xbox 360; JP: September 8, 2011; NA: September 20, 2011; EU: September 21, 2011; Android; JP: January 23, 2013; WW: April 23, 2013 (Samsung); PlayStation 4, Xbox One; WW: August 30, 2016; Nintendo Switch; WW: May 21, 2019; JP: May 23, 2019; Oculus Quest 2; WW: October 21, 2021
- Genres: Survival horror, third-person shooter
- Mode: Single-player

Resident Evil 4 (Note: Known in Japan as Biohazard 4 (Japanese: バイオハザード4, Hepburn: Baiohazādo 4)) is a 2005 survival horror game developed and published by Capcom for the GameCube. Players control the special agent Leon S. Kennedy on a mission to rescue the president of the United States's daughter, Ashley Graham, who has been abducted by a religious cult in rural Spain. Leon fights hordes of enemies infected by a mind-controlling parasite and reunites with the female spy and mercenary Ada Wong. In a departure from the fixed camera angles and slower gameplay of previous Resident Evil games, Resident Evil 4 features a dynamic camera system and action-horror oriented gameplay.

Development began for the PlayStation 2 in 1999. Four proposed versions were discarded. The first was directed by Hideki Kamiya, but the series creator, Shinji Mikami, felt it was too great a departure, so it became a new game, Devil May Cry (2001). Other versions were discarded until Mikami took over as the director. Resident Evil 4 was announced as part of the Capcom Five, a collaboration between Capcom and Nintendo to create five exclusives for the GameCube.

Resident Evil 4 received acclaim for its gameplay, graphics, story, characters, and voice acting, and won multiple Game of the Year awards. It was ported to numerous formats, and became a multi-platform hit, selling 15.2 million copies by March 2025. Resident Evil 4 is widely cited as one of the best and most influential video games ever made. It influenced the evolution of the survival horror and third-person genres, popularizing the "over-the-shoulder" third-person view used in games such as Gears of War, Dead Space, and The Last of Us. Resident Evil 5 was released in 2009 and a remake was released in 2023.

== Gameplay ==
The player controls Leon S. Kennedy, from a third-person perspective. Departing from the series' previous games, the gameplay focuses more on combat and shootouts. The camera is placed behind Leon and zooms in for an over-the-shoulder view when aiming a weapon, or a first-person view when aiming with a sniper rifle. There is no crosshair for firearms; instead, every firearm has a laser sight. Unlike previous games where players can only shoot straight, up, or down, players have more options. For example, shots to the feet can cause enemies to stumble, and shots to the arms can make them drop their weapons. Players can also shoot down projectiles like thrown axes or scythes.

Leon fighting a group of Ganados. Unlike previous entries in the series, Resident Evil 4 has the camera following directly behind the character. The laser sight enables the player to target key zones on enemies.

Resident Evil 4 adds context-sensitive controls. Based on the situation, players can interact with the environment: kicking down a ladder, jumping out of a window, dodging an attack or executing a "finishing move" on weakened enemies. There are also quick time events, in which the player must press buttons indicated on-screen to execute actions such as dodging a falling boulder or wrestling an enemy to stay alive. These are often incorporated into occasional boss fights, in which the player must avoid instant-kill attacks.

The main enemies are violent villagers referred to as Los Ganados ("The Cattle" in Spanish). They can dodge, wield melee and projectile weapons, and are capable of working collectively and communicating with each other. Once simple farmers until becoming the product of an infestation of Las Plagas ("The Plague" in Spanish), Los Ganados can gain the ability to cause mutated parasites to sprout from their heads.

The inventory system features a grid system, represented by an attaché case, that has each item take up a certain number of spaces. The case can be upgraded several times, allowing for more space. Weapons, ammunition, and healing items are kept in the case, while key items and treasures are kept in a separate menu. Items may be bought from and sold to the Merchant that appears in various locations. He sells first aid sprays, weapons, allows for weapons to be upgraded and buys various treasures that Leon finds. The various weapons each have their own advantages and disadvantages.

Capcom added content for the PlayStation 2 version, which was later incorporated into the PC and Wii releases. The largest addition is "Separate Ways", a side story which focuses on Ada Wong's involvement in Resident Evil 4 and her connection to the series' villain Albert Wesker. "Ada's Report", a five-part documentary, analyzes Ada's relationship with Wesker and his role in the plot. Other unlockable content in all versions includes the minigame "The Mercenaries" and short scenario "Assignment Ada" (using Ada to retrieve Las Plagas samples), new costumes for Leon and Ashley, new weapons, and a cutscene browser.

== Plot ==
In 2004, U.S. government agent Leon S. Kennedy (Paul Mercier) is on a mission to rescue Ashley Graham (Carolyn Lawrence), the U.S. President's daughter, who has been abducted by a mysterious cult. He travels to an unnamed rural village in Spain, where he encounters a group of hostile villagers who pledge their lives to Los Iluminados, the cult that kidnapped Ashley. The villagers were once simple farmers until becoming infected by a mind-controlling parasite known as Las Plagas.

While in the village, Leon is captured by its chief, Bitores Mendez, and injected with Las Plagas. He finds himself held captive with Luis Sera (Rino Romano), a former police officer in Madrid, and former Los Iluminados researcher. The two work together to escape, but soon go their separate ways. Leon finds out Ashley is being held in a church and rescues her. They both escape from the church after Osmund Saddler (Michael Gough), leader of the cult, reveals his plan to use the parasite they injected into Ashley to manipulate her into injecting the President of the United States with a "sample" once she returns home, allowing Saddler to begin his conquest of the world.

After fighting and killing many of the villagers, including Mendez in a vicious fight, Leon and Ashley try to take refuge in a castle but are attacked by more Iluminados under the command of Ramon Salazar (Rene Mujica), another of Saddler's henchmen who owns the castle, and the two become separated by Salazar's traps. Meanwhile, Luis searches for pills that will slow Leon and Ashley's infection, as well as a sample of Las Plagas. He brings the two items to Leon but is killed by Saddler, who takes the sample, while the pills to suppress the infection remain in Leon's hands. While in the castle, Leon briefly encounters Ada Wong (Sally Cahill), a woman from his past who supports him during his mission while also operating to finish her own agenda to recover a Las Plagas sample, for her current mysterious employer, who is evidently one of the unnamed rivals of the now defunct Umbrella corporation. He battles his way through the castle before killing Salazar.

Afterward, Leon travels to a nearby island research facility, where he continues the search for Ashley. He discovers that one of his former training comrades, Jack Krauser (Jim Ward), who was believed to have been killed in a helicopter crash two years prior, is responsible for her kidnapping in an attempt to get close enough to Saddler to steal his new Plagas sample. Ada and Krauser are working with Albert Wesker (Richard Waugh), for whom both intend to secure a Plagas sample, though Krauser is suspicious of Ada. Suspicious of the mercenary's intentions, Saddler orders Krauser to kill Leon, believing that no matter which one dies, he will benefit. After Krauser's defeat, Leon rescues Ashley, and they remove the Plagas from their bodies using a specialized radiotherapeutic device. Leon confronts Saddler, and with Ada's help, manages to kill him. However, Ada takes the sample from Leon at gunpoint before escaping in a helicopter sent by her employer, leaving Leon and Ashley to escape via her Jet Ski as the island explodes.

== Development ==
In 1999, producer Shinji Mikami said a Resident Evil sequel was in development for PlayStation 2. Resident Evil 4 underwent a lengthy development, during which at least four versions were discarded. The first version was directed by Hideki Kamiya. Around the turn of the millennium, Resident Evil 2 writer Noboru Sugimura created a story based on Kamiya's idea to make a "cool" and "stylish" action game. The story was based on unraveling the mystery surrounding the body of the protagonist, Tony, an invincible man with skills and an intellect exceeding that of normal people, with his superhuman abilities explained with biotechnology. As Kamiya felt the playable character did not look brave and heroic enough in battles from a fixed angle, he decided to drop the prerendered backgrounds from previous installments and use a dynamic camera system. The team spent 11 days in the United Kingdom and Spain, photographing objects such as Gothic statues, bricks, and stone pavements for use in textures.

Though the developers tried to make the "coolness" theme fit into the world of Resident Evil, Mikami felt it strayed too far from the series' survival horror roots and gradually convinced the staff to make an independent game. This became a new Capcom franchise, Devil May Cry, released for the PlayStation 2 in August 2001.

=== "Fog" version ===
Development on Resident Evil 4 restarted at the end of 2001. The first announcement was made in November 2002, as one of five games developed exclusively for the GameCube by Capcom Production Studio 4, the Capcom Five. This revision, commonly dubbed the "fog version", was directed by Hiroshi Shibata and was 40 percent finished at that time. The game saw Leon S. Kennedy struggling to survive after having infiltrated Umbrella's castle-like main headquarters located in Europe and featured traditional Resident Evil monsters such as zombies. During the course of the new story which was again written by Sugimura's scenario creation company Flagship, Leon became infected with the Progenitor Virus and possessed a hidden power in his left hand. The producer of the final version also pointed out that Ashley did not appear back then, though there was a different girl who was never revealed to the public. The game was to feature some first-person elements.

The story of the Progenitor Virus was eventually covered in Resident Evil 5 (2009) and the Spencer Estate became the setting for Resident Evil 5's downloadable content (DLC) pack "Lost in Nightmares" (featuring Chris Redfield and Jill Valentine).

=== "Hook Man" version ===
This screenshot of a cancelled version depicts Leon fighting the hook man. Though this earlier revision still used fixed camera angles while exploring environments, the battles already employed the over-the-shoulder view seen in the final build.

At E3 2003, Capcom showcased a different iteration of the game. During Mikami's introduction of the trailer, he assured that development was proceeding smoothly and claimed the game was scarier than ever before. The story was set in a haunted building where Leon contracted a bizarre disease and fought paranormal enemies, such as animated suits of armor, living dolls, and a ghostlike man armed with a large hook. The game had an otherworldly feel to it, containing elements like flashback and hallucinations that were marked by a bluish tint and a shaking camera. It also displayed various gameplay mechanics that carried over to the final release, like the over-the-shoulder camera, a laser sight for aiming in battles and quick time events.

The "Hook Man" version had only a basic story concept, having dropped the previous scenario penned by Noboru Sugimura of Flagship. In 2012, Resident Evil 3: Nemesis (1999) scenario writer Yasuhisa Kawamura said he was responsible for this version, as he wanted to make Biohazard 4 scarier "and suggested using a particular scene from the American film Lost Souls (2000), where the main character [...] suddenly finds herself in a derelict building with a killer on the loose. An arranged version of this idea eventually turned into Hook Man." Kawamura added he was very sorry and "even ashamed" that Mikami had to step in and scrap this version. After this attempt, the last cancelled revision featured classic zombies again. However, it was discontinued after a few months, and before it was ever shown to the public, as the developers felt it was too formulaic.

Five minutes of gameplay footage of this iteration were released on the Biohazard 4 Secret DVD, a Japanese pre-order bonus given out in January 2005; this version was referred to as Maboroshi no Biohazard 4 (幻の「バイオハザード4」; lit. 'The Phantom Biohazard 4').

=== Final version ===
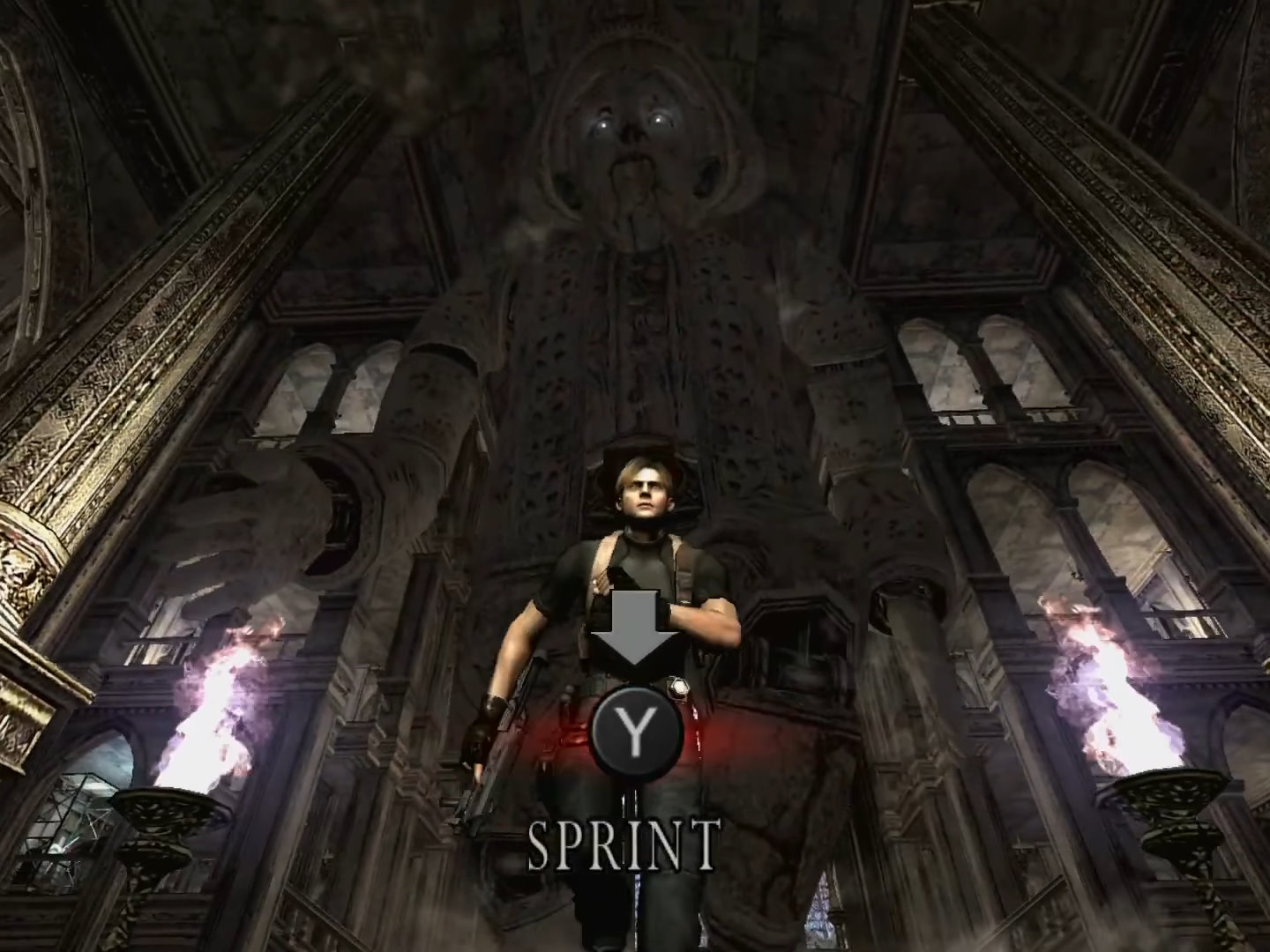
A quick time event in Resident Evil 4. The player is prompted to repeatedly press Y to make the character sprint.

It was decided to reinvent the series. Mikami took over directorial duties from Shibata and began working on the version that was released. In an interview with Game Informer, Mikami explained his decision to shift to a new gameplay system is due to the feeling that the older system is "more of the same" after playing Resident Evil Zero. He says that he only felt nervous once more when playing with the newer system. Speaking for the team, game producer Hiroyuki Kobayashi mentioned how the staff was "tired of the same thing" and how some got bored and moved on to other projects. In addition to that, the producer also felt that the older format was "stuck in a cookie cutter mold" and described it as "shackles holding us down".

However, some of the staff members disagreed about changing the gameplay system. These members felt depressed and were hard to motivate after the game's focus shifted to be more action-oriented. Although Mikami demanded the camera system be revised, the team had reservations about making big changes to the series he had created. Eventually, he intervened, explained his proposed changes, and wrote a new story that, unlike previous installments, was not centered on the company Umbrella. Mikami wrote the entire story in just three weeks due to time constraints. Inspired by Onimusha 3: Demon Siege (2004), a game Mikami had enjoyed playing but felt could have been better with a different view, he decided to place the camera behind the playable character. To go along with the new gameplay and story, a new type of enemy called "Ganado" was created, as opposed to using the undead creatures from previous Resident Evil games. Furthermore, producers expended additional detail to modify and update characters that had previously appeared in the series. In a documentary explaining the conception of the characters, Kamiya stated he intended to make Leon Kennedy "look tougher, but also cool".

Kobayashi was responsible for the design of some of the final game's enemies, such as the Regenerators. Kobayashi described the creatures' origins within universe lore as byproducts of Los Iluminados' research into bioorganic weapons, malformed creations implanted with multiple Plaga parasites during the experimentation process. Regenerators are designed to take distinct heavy breaths before they are seen, which alerts the player to their presence. When encountered, often in small confined spaces, they would walk slowly towards the player character. The Regenerator is capable of continuously regenerating itself and cannot easily be dispatched unless the player is able to find the Plaga parasites within its body, which can only be seen with the infrared scope, and specifically target them first. During an interview with Famitsu, Mikami explained that elements like the Regenerators help maintain the survival horror aspect of Resident Evil 4 as a balance between a "scary kind of gameplay and the challenge of overcoming that fear", with the goal of giving players a sense of achievement when they manage to overcome the monster.

The English voice actors recorded their parts in four sessions, over three to four months. Capcom assigned Shinsaku Ohara as script translator and voice over coordinator. Carolyn Lawrence, who provided the voice for Ashley Graham, described her character as "vulnerable, because Leon has to come to her rescue all the time". She also described Kennedy's character as "more brawn, perhaps, than brain". In addition to the voice acting, the game's designer detailed each cinematic sequence so that each character's facial expressions matched the tone of their voice actor.

Along with Resident Evil: Dead Aim and Resident Evil Outbreak (both 2003), two side story games that did not fall under the exclusive policy, it was announced on October 31, 2004, that Resident Evil 4 would come to the PlayStation 2 in 2005, citing increased profit, changing market conditions, and increased consumer satisfaction as the key reasons. The PlayStation 2 version included new features, primarily a new sub-game featuring Ada Wong. On February 1, 2006, Ubisoft announced that they would be publishing the game on the PC for Windows. On April 4, 2007, a Wii version was announced and was launched later in the year. The game features all of the extras in the PS2 version, along with other additions, including a trailer for Resident Evil: The Umbrella Chronicles.

== Release ==
The original version for the GameCube featured two different collector's editions. The first was available as a pre-order that included the game, the Prologue art book, and a T-shirt. GameStop offered another limited edition that was packaged in a tin box with the art book, a cel of Leon, and a soundtrack CD. Australia received an exclusive collector's edition that came with the game and a bonus disc with interviews and creator's footage. Nintendo handled marketing sales and distribution in Europe and Australia.

=== Ports ===
Resident Evil 4 was ported to the PlayStation 2 after Capcom stated that it did not fall under the exclusivity deal with Nintendo. It was released in North America on October 25, 2005. The largest addition is "Separate Ways", a new scenario for Ada written by Haruo Murata. According to producer Masachika Kawata, the Separate Ways campaign was something thought up by the PS2 porting team and was added after getting approval from Shinji Mikami. The PlayStation 2 version featured two standard and collector's bundles from pre-orders. The standard package included the game and a T-shirt, while the collector's bundle also included a figurine of Leon, and the soundtrack Biohazard Sound Chronicle Best Track Box. This quickly sold out, and a second pressing was released that included an Ada figurine. Another, called the Resident Evil 4: Premium Edition, was packaged in a SteelBook media case, along with the art book, a documentary DVD, and a cel art of Ada. Resident Evil 4 was re-released alongside Resident Evil - Code: Veronica X and Resident Evil Outbreak as part of the Resident Evil: The Essentials collection for the PS2 on September 4, 2007.

A PC port of Resident Evil 4 developed by Sourcenext was released in Hong Kong on February 1, 2007, published by Typhoon Games. It was subsequently released in Europe, North America, and Australia in March 2007, and was published by Ubisoft. The port contains the bonus features from the PS2 version, such as "Separate Ways", the P.R.L. 412 laser cannon and a second set of unlockable costumes for Leon and Ashley, as well as an Easy difficulty level. It also supports multiple widescreen resolutions. The shadow and lighting problems were fixed in the only patch, Version 1.10.

Resident Evil 4: Wii Edition was released for the Wii on May 31, 2007, in Japan and on June 19, 2007, in the United States. It features updated controls that utilize the pointing and motion-sensing abilities of the Wii Remote and Nunchuk, though both the GameCube controller and the Classic Controller are also supported. The Wii Remote is able to aim and shoot anywhere on the screen with a reticle that replaces the laser sight found in the other versions, and motion-based gestures are used to perform some context-sensitive actions, such as dodging or slashing. The Wii Edition also includes the extra content from the PS2 and PC versions, and a trailer for Resident Evil: The Umbrella Chronicles. The Wii Edition became available for download from the Wii U's Nintendo eShop in Europe on October 29, 2015.

Resident Evil 4: Mobile Edition was released in Japan for au's BREW 4.0 on February 1, 2008. It was announced by Capcom at TGS 2007. Differences from the original include changing the flow of the story from being continuous to being divided into sections such as "Village", "Ravine", "Fortress" and "Subterranean Tunnel". There is also a more challenging Mercenary Mode. The game uses the MascotCapsule eruption engine and was adapted to the Zeebo and iOS platforms. On July 13, 2009, without any formal announcement, Resident Evil 4: Mobile Edition was released by Capcom for the iOS platform via the App Store in Japan, but was quickly removed, though some players were able to purchase and download it. The game has since been released in Japan and North America. Later, Capcom made an update that had different difficulty levels and high scores. Capcom released a new separate version called Resident Evil 4 for Beginners, which offers the first two levels (three counting a training level) of both Story Mode and Mercenary Mode. However, the rest of the levels are available for purchase in-game as downloadable content. Due to the release of the iPad, Capcom recreated the iPhone version of Resident Evil 4: Mobile Edition and updated it to HD graphics as Resident Evil 4: iPad Edition.

On March 23, 2011, Capcom announced high-definition (HD) remastered versions of Resident Evil – Code: Veronica and Resident Evil 4 for the Xbox 360 and PlayStation 3, as part of the Resident Evil: Revival Selection series. The ports feature all the bonus content from the previous releases, including "Separate Ways". On July 23, 2011, Capcom announced at San Diego Comic-Con 2011 that Resident Evil 4 would be released on September 20 for the PlayStation Network and Xbox Live Games on Demand. In Japan, Resident Evil 4 and Resident Evil – Code: Veronica were released on a single disc as Biohazard Revival Selection on September 8, 2011. In North America and Europe, the games were only released as downloads on Xbox Live Games on Demand and PlayStation Network. On February 27, 2014, Capcom released Resident Evil 4 Ultimate HD Edition for Windows. The port features improved graphics and enhancements included in Resident Evil 4 HD. Resident Evil 4 was rereleased on PlayStation 4 and Xbox One on August 30, 2016. In April 2013, Resident Evil 4 was released on Android. Outside of Japan, it is exclusive to Samsung through their Galaxy Store. Capcom announced in October 2018 that Resident Evil 4 would be published for the Nintendo Switch in 2019, along with releases of Resident Evil and Resident Evil Zero (both 2002).

In October 2021, Capcom released a virtual reality (VR) version of Resident Evil 4 for the Oculus Quest 2. Developed by the American Armature Studio, many elements of gameplay like combat and inventory management were changed to accommodate VR. This version, which runs on Unreal Engine 4, also includes redesigned textures with increased resolution. The developers and executive producer Tom Ivey stated that there were changes made to "update the game for a modern audience", and a number of in-game animations (such as the animation triggered when players attempted to look up Ashley's skirt), dialogue and flirtatious banter between characters were removed. It also does not include both "Separate Ways" and "Assignment: Ada".

=== Merchandise ===
Biohazard 4 Original Soundtrack was released in Japan on December 22, 2005. It contains 62 compositions from the game and the 48-page Visual Booklet with liner notes from composers Shusaku Uchiyama and Misao Senbongi. Other merchandise included figures by McFarlane Toys, NECA and Hot Toys. Agatsuma Entertainment has also created various miniature collectibles based on several main characters and enemies from Resident Evil 4. Two special controllers designed to resemble chainsaws were designed by NubyTech for use with the GameCube and PlayStation 2 versions.

== Reception ==
=== Reviews ===
Reception

Aggregate score
Aggregator	Score
Metacritic	NGC: 96/100; PC: 76/100; PC (Ultimate HD Edition): 79/100; PS2: 96/100; PS3: 84/100; Wii: 91/100; X360: 84/100

Review scores
Publication	Score
1Up.com	NGC: A PC: A Wii: B+
Edge	NGC: 9/10
Famitsu	Wii: 9/10, 9/10, 10/10, 10/10
GameSpot	NGC: 9.6/10; PC: 7.8/10; PS2: 9.3/10; Wii: 9.1/10
GameSpy	NGC: 5/5; PC: 3.5/5; PS2: 5/5; Wii: 5/5
GameTrailers	NGC: 9.6/10 Wii: 9.3/10
IGN	NGC: 9.8/10; PC: 7.7/10; PS2: 9.5/10; PS3: 8.5/10; Wii: 9/10
Nintendo Power	NGC: 10/10
Official Xbox Magazine (US)	X360: 9/10
PC Gamer (US)	PC: 85/100

The GameCube and PlayStation 2 versions of Resident Evil 4 have a score of 96/100 on Metacritic, indicating "universal acclaim". These versions have the top ranking on Metacritic's list of the Best Video Games for 2005. In addition to the gameplay, the characters and story received positive commentary, leading to the finished product being deemed as one of the best video games ever made. GameSpot's Greg Kasavin praised the voice acting, but claimed that it was betrayed by "some uncharacteristically goofy dialogue". Yahoo! Games' Adam Pavlacka and GameSpot's Kevin VanOrd acclaimed Capcom for adding great amounts of detail to the characters. IGN's Matt Casamassina went into further detail in his review for Resident Evil 4, praising not only the detailed character design but also the fight choreography and three-dimensional modeling within cinematic sequences. Casamassina also complimented the voice actors, especially Paul Mercier (Leon), commenting, "For once, the characters are believable because Capcom has hired competent actors to supply their voices. Leon in particular is very well produced". IGN and Nintendo Power specifically recognized Resident Evil 4's character design and voice acting. The increased variety of weapons has been praised by gaming publications such as GamePro and Game Over Online. G4 television program X-Play gave it a 5 out of 5, for introducing a new style of gameplay for the series as well as incorporating moments where the player would have to interact with the cut scenes. Not long after, it was awarded as the best game ever reviewed on the show. The makers of Resident Evil 4 worked on various innovations associated with the use and inventory of weapons. Game Over stated that players can use the vast array of weapons to "go for headshots now". Game Informer stated that ammunition is more plentiful in Resident Evil 4 than in other games in the series, making it more action-oriented.

The ratings of the PC port, along with the Ultimate HD Edition release, were not as high as for the other versions. The original PC port was criticized for no mouse support and frustrating keyboard controls, low-quality FMV cutscenes, and choppy lighting graphics rendering. Despite these problems, it received generally positive reviews from critics, including IGN and GameSpot, which praised the gameplay, character models and environments, and sound design. GameRevolution referred to the game's Ultimate HD Edition as "a bare-bones port of a nonetheless spectacular game", noting "minor superficial alterations" similar to the 2007 PC port and asserting that the true "Ultimate Edition" of Resident Evil 4 is the Wii version. Japanese game magazine Famitsu reviewed the Wii version, with two editors giving it a perfect 10 score, and the remaining pair giving it a 9, resulting in a score of 38 out of 40. The reviewers felt that the new controls offer something fresh. Multiple reviewers agreed that even those who own the original will find something fun and enjoyable in this version. British magazine NGamer gave the Wii Edition a score of 96%, slightly lower than the 97% given to the GameCube version. They praised the visuals, controls, and features and commented on the fact that such an "exceptional package" was on sale for a low price; however, when writing about the Wii controls, they said, "if you've played the GC version this won't be as special". Official Nintendo Magazine gave the Wii version 94%, 3% less than the original due to it simply not having the same impact it did back then. In 2009, they went on to place the game 9th on a list of the greatest Nintendo games of all time. IGN praised the Wii version, stating it is the superior edition, but does not push the Wii like it did with GameCube and PS2. GameSpot praised the new controls of the Wii Edition but commented on the lack of exclusive Wii features. Hyper's Jonti Davies commended Resident Evil 4: Wii Edition for its "visual improvements" but criticized it for having "no new content". The PS3 version of Resident Evil 4 HD received a score of 9.0 from Destructoid, which called it "a hallmark of excellence". In their October 2013 issue, Edge retroactively awarded it ten out of ten.

=== Awards ===
Resident Evil 4 was named Game of the Year by publications including Edge, Electronic Gaming Monthly, GameTrailers, Game Informer, GamePro, GameRevolution, the Chicago Tribune, and the Pittsburgh Post-Gazette. It was also included in lists of the best games of 2005 by various media outlets, including Play, the Associated Press, Universal Press Syndicate, The Mercury News, Maxim, Sound & Vision, The News Tribune, the Hartford Courant, and The Oregonian. GameSpy labeled it the GameCube Game of the Year, the second PlayStation 2 Game of the Year (behind God of War) and the second Game of the Year (behind Civilization IV). PlayStation Magazine also labeled it the second Game of the Year, in addition to Best Graphics and Most Improved Sequel.

At the GameSpot's Best of 2005 Awards, Resident Evil 4 was chosen Game of the Year, Best GameCube Game, Best Action Adventure Game, and Most Improved Sequel. It won Game of the Year, Best Action Game, Best Graphics Technology, Best Artistic Design, Best Original Score, and Best Use of Sound in the GameCube division of IGN's The Best of 2005 Awards, where it also won Overall – Best Graphics Technology award, as well as being a runner-up in the Overall – Game of the Year and Overall – Best Action Game categories. The game was 1UP Awards' Game of the Year and Best Action Game winner. It went on to win Game of the Year 2005, Best Horror Game of the Year 2005, GameCube Game of the Year 2005, and GameCube Action Game of the Year 2005 awards, and was a runner-up in PlayStation 2 Game of the Year 2005 and PlayStation 2 Action Game of the Year 2005 classifications at GameZone's Game of the Year Awards. Nintendo Power awarded Resident Evil 4 Game of the Year, Best Adventure Game, Game of the Year – GameCube, Best Graphics – GameCube, Best Sound / Voice Acting at its awards show. During the Nintendojo's Best of 2005 Awards, the game received recognition as the runner-up for Best Gameplay Innovation and Most Engrossing Game. Additionally, it emerged victorious in the categories of Best Game, Period., Best GameCube Visuals, Best GameCube Gameplay, and Best GameCube Overall. At the PALGN Awards, it won Action Game of the Year for 2005, GameCube Game of the Year for 2005, Overall Game of the Year for 2005. It earned runner-up in the category of PlayStation 2 Game of the Year for 2005.

The virtual reality port of Resident Evil 4 was named VR/AR Game of the Year at the Game Awards 2021, and was also named XR Game of the Year at the SXSW Gaming Awards. At the 11th New York Game Awards, it won Best AR/VR Game and Best Remake. Resident Evil 4 VR was nominated for Immersive Reality Game of the Year and Immersive Reality Technical Achievement at the 25th Annual D.I.C.E. Awards.

Year	Award	Category	Result	Ref(s).
2004	CESA Game Awards	Future Award for Excellence	Won	
2004	Game Critics Awards	Best Console Game	Nominated	
2004	Game Critics Awards	Best Action/Adventure Game	Nominated	
2004	Golden Joystick Awards	Most Wanted Game for 2005	Runner-up	
2005	CESA Game Awards	Award for Excellence	Won	
2005	Golden Joystick Awards	GameCube Game of the Year	Won	
2005	Golden Joystick Awards	Editor's Game of the Year	Won	
2005	Golden Joystick Awards	Best Film-Based Game of 2005	Won	
2005	Spike Video Game Awards	Game of the Year	Won	
2005	Spike Video Game Awards	Action Game of the Year	Nominated	
2005	Spike Video Game Awards	Best Graphics	Won	
2006	Annie Awards	Best Animated Video Game	Nominated	
2006	Famitsu Awards	Grand Prize	Won (Note: Shared with Kingdom Hearts II)	
2006	Game Developers Choice Awards	Visual Arts	Nominated	
2006	Golden Joystick Awards	PlayStation Game of the Year	Won	
2006	Golden Joystick Awards	Ultimate Game of 2006	Nominated	
2006	Saturn Awards	Best Video Game Release: Horror	Won	

=== Sales ===
The GameCube version sold over 320,000 copies in North America during the first twenty days. The European release sold its entire 200,000 copies during the first month. By December 2005, 3 million copies of the GameCube and PlayStation 2 versions had been shipped worldwide. According to January 17, 2007, sales figures provided by Capcom, the GameCube version of Resident Evil 4 had sold a total of 1.6 million copies worldwide, while the PS2 version had sold over 2 million copies. As of March 2025, Resident Evil 4 had sold 15.2 million copies. It holds the record for "Best-Selling Survival Horror Game" in the 2012 Guinness World Records Gamer's Edition.

== Legacy ==
Resident Evil 4 is considered one of the best video games of all time. It is included in the reference book 1001 Video Games You Must Play Before You Die (2014). Nintendo Power ranked it as number one in their list of the top 25 best GameCube games of all time in 2005 and also ranked it second on their list of the best games of the 2000s in 2010. In 2008, Resident Evil 4 was ranked first place in the list of the best video games of all time according to the readers of IGN, and sixth place in the list of the best PlayStation 2 games of all time according to the IGN staff. In 2021, IGN ranked the game as the 40th best game of all time. In 2009, Game Informer ranked Resident Evil 4 number one on their list of top GameCube games and number three on their list of top PlayStation 2 games. In 2022, Complex magazine named it the tenth-best PlayStation 2 game of all time. GamePro ranked it as the second best game for the PS2. In 2010, the readers of PlayStation Official Magazine voted it the 10th greatest PlayStation game. In 2007, Edge ranked the game at second place in its list of top games of all time, behind only The Legend of Zelda: Ocarina of Time (1998). That same year, G4 named it the 21st top video game of all time, calling it "a modern horror masterpiece." In 2015, it placed 7th on USgamer's The 15 Best Games Since 2000 list. In early 2006, in their 200th issue, Nintendo Power ranked it in second place in their Top 200 Games of all-time list, also behind only The Legend of Zelda: Ocarina of Time. In 2025, Rolling Stone named it the 27th-greatest game.

Resident Evil 4 is regarded as one of the most influential games of the 2000s, particularly due to its influence in redefining the third-person shooter genre by introducing offset camera angles that do not obscure action. The new gameplay alterations and immersive style appealed to many not previously familiar with the series. The over-the-shoulder viewpoint became standard for action games, including Gears of War, Batman: Arkham Asylum, Dead Space, Grand Theft Auto, Ratchet & Clank, Fallout, Uncharted, Mass Effect and The Last of Us. In 2019, Game Informer called Resident Evil 4 the most important third-person shooter and said it "innovated two genres", inspiring developers of both survival horror and shooter games.

Resident Evil 4 redefined the survival horror genre by emphasizing reflexes and precision aiming, thus broadening the gameplay of the series with elements from the wider action game genre. However, this also led some reviewers to suggest that the Resident Evil series had abandoned the survival horror genre, by demolishing the genre conventions that it had established. Other major survival horror series followed suit, by developing their combat systems to feature more action, such as Silent Hill: Homecoming and the 2008 version of Alone in the Dark. These changes represent an overall trend among console games shifting towards visceral action gameplay.

While working on The Last of Us, Naughty Dog took cues from Resident Evil 4, particularly the tension and action. Dead Space designers Ben Wanat and Wright Bagwell stated that their game was originally intended to be System Shock 3 before the release of Resident Evil 4 inspired them to go back to the drawing board. BioShock (2007) was also influenced by Resident Evil 4, including its approach to the environments, combat, and tools, its game design and tactical elements, its "gameplay fuelled storytelling" and inventory system, and its opening village level in terms of how it "handled the sandbox nature of the combat" and in terms of "the environment." Cory Barlog cited Resident Evil 4 as an influence on the God of War series, including God of War II (2007) and particularly God of War (2018), which was influenced by Resident Evil 4's "combination of poised camera exploration and scavenging". Uncharted director Bruce Straley called the Resident Evil 4 village sequence the best opening fight in a video game.

Resident Evil Village (2021) was influenced by Resident Evil 4. The director said, "If Resident Evil 7 was like a reboot that inherited the DNA of the original Resident Evil, then you could say that this time we're doing the same for Resident Evil 4. We've designed the game and its structure with Resident Evil 4's essence in mind".

VentureBeat credits Resident Evil 4 HD as an early example of HD video game remasters. A remake of Resident Evil 4 was released on March 24, 2023, on the PlayStation 4, PlayStation 5, Windows, and the Xbox Series X and Series S. The remake was also announced for the iPhone 15 Pro, to be released between late 2023 to early 2024.

In June 2021, the photographer and author Judy Juracek launched legal proceedings against Capcom for allegedly using images from her book Surfaces: Visual Research for Artists, Architects, and Designers (1996) without her permission to create textures for multiple games, including Resident Evil 4 and Devil May Cry. The parties reached an undisclosed settlement outside of court in February 2022. Capcom and Juracek have amicably resolved their dispute concerning the alleged use of her photos in Capcom's games. A dismissal was filed on February 7, 2022, with the United States District Court for the District of Connecticut to end the lawsuit.
