= Chisa Yokoyama =

Japanese voice actress

- 横山 智佐
- Born: December 20, 1969 (age 56); Sumida, Tokyo, Japan
- Occupations: Actress; voice actress; singer
- Years active: 1987–present
- Height: 158 cm (5 ft 2 in)
- Spouse: Chaka (m. 2009)
- Children: 1

Chisa Yokoyama (横山 智佐, Yokoyama Chisa; born December 20, 1969) is a Japanese actress, voice actress and singer from Tokyo, Japan. She was affiliated with Arts Vision but has since founded her own voice company called Banbina. When she was a high school student, she was an assistant of Jump Broadcasting Station of Weekly Shōnen Jump (1988–1996). Some of her major roles are Sasami Masaki Jurai (Tenchi Muyo!), Ryoko Subaru (Martian Successor Nadesico), Lucrezia Noin (Mobile Suit Gundam Wing) and Sakura Shinguji (Sakura Wars). She married musician Chaka from the band Tripolysm and their first child was born in September 2015.

== Filmography ==
=== Animation ===
List of voice performances in animation
Year	Series	Role	Notes	Source
1987	Black Magic M-66	Ferris	Debut voice role	
1987	Robot Carnival	Yayoi	feature film anthology	
1989	Yawara!	West Sea University Judo Club members		
1989	Robin Jr. ja:レスラー軍団〈銀河編〉 聖戦士ロビンJr.	Menma Green P		
1989	Peachboy Legend	Kiji no kiko		
1990	Brave Exkaiser	Kotomi Gassan		
1990	Idol Tenshi Youkoso Yoko	Haruka, Chicchi	Ep. 26, 40	
1990	NG Knight Ramune & 40	Milk		
1990	Peach Command New Peachboy Legend	Yashaki		
1991	Holly the Ghost	Kirakiran		
1991	Bubblegum Crisis	AD Police Receptionist	Ep. 8	
1991	Shakotan Boogie	Gachako		
1991	Future GPX Cyber Formula	Rita Moreno		
1991	Matchless Raijin-Oh	Ruriko Izumi		
1991	Jankenman	Ururun		
1991	Cleopatra DC	Sarah	Ep. 3	
1991	Oh! My Konbu	Menmen		
1991	Jungle Wars	Mio	OVA	
1991	Roujin Z	Haruko		
1991	Magical Princess Minky Momo Hold on to Your Dreams	Rupipi		
1991	Genji Tsūshin Agedama	Mika		
1991	Marude Dameo	Cinderella		
1991	Gall Force: New Era	Chris		
1991	Otohime Connection	Okuda Yuuki	OVA	
1991	Sohryuden: Legend of the Dragon Kings	Asada Eri		
1992	Mama wa Shōgaku 4 Nensei	Ushio Arimori		
1992	Floral Magician Mary Bell	Rose (child)		
1992	Boyfriend	Mami		
1992	Tekkaman Blade	Milly		
1992	Madō King Granzort	Maria	OAV	
1992	Cooking Papa	Osamu Akiyama		
1992	Pretty Soldier Sailor Moon	Female Office		
1992	Crayon Shin-chan	Hitoshi	Second	
1992	Ashita e no Free Kick	Ingrid		
1992	Spirit of Wonder	Robin		
1992	Iron Virgin Jun	Jun	OAV	
1992	Princess Army	Aida Nonoka	OAV	
1992–present	Tenchi Muyo! series	Sasami Masaki Jurai, Tsunami	Also feature films	
1992	Hime-chan no Ribbon	Hasekura Emi, Itou, Nononhara Yumeko		
1992	YuYu Hakusho	Murugu		
1992	Mikan Enikki	Shizuyo		
1992	Ellcia	Neera		
1992	Wolf Guy	Tiger 4 (Fu Su)		
1992	Nontan no Issho	Usagi-san		
1993	Kōryū Densetsu Villgust	Ryukia	OAV, also sang ending theme ep. 1	
1993	V Gundam	Neneka		
1993	Shippū! Iron Leaguer	Ginjou Ruly		
1993	Mask of Zeguy	Miki		
1993	Shima Shima Tora no Shimajirō	Purokku		
1994	Haō Taikei Ryū Knight	Cutey Soldier Red		
1994	Yu Yu Hakusho The Movie: Poltergeist Report	Hinageshi	OAV	
1994	Mahōjin Guru Guru	Frill		
1995	Gulliver Boy	Misty	TV series	
1995	Zenki	Chiaki Enno		
1995	2112: The Birth of Doraemon	Yellow Doraemon, Dora-the-Kid, Other Yellow Robot Cats	Short film	
1995	Wedding Peach	Pritz		
1995	Gundam Wing	Lucrezia Noin		
1995	Street Fighter II V	Chun-Li		
1995	Magical Girl Pretty Sammy	Sasami Kawai / Pretty Sammy, Tsunami	OAV series	
1995	Kodocha	Sana Kurata	OVA pilot episode	
1996	Rurouni Kenshin	Maya, Misanagi	TV series	
1996	VS Knight Ramune & 40 Fire	Milk/Momo-kaze		
1996	B't X	Kari		
1996	Lupin III: Dead or Alive	Emera		
1996	Violinist of Hameln	Flute	film	
1996–97	Martian Successor Nadesico	Ryoko, Queen		
1996	Gall Force: The Revolution	Rami		
1996	Magical Project S	Sasami Kawai / Pretty Sammy, Tsunami		
1996	Mobile Suit Gundam: The 08th MS Team	Radio DJ	OAV ep. 6	
1996–97	Galaxy Fraulein Yuna	Yuna Kagurazaka	OVA series	
1997	Case Closed	Suzu	Ep. 61-62	
1997	Cho Mashin Hero Wataru	Donarukami Doruku		
1997–2007	Sakura Wars series	Sakura Shinguji	Also films and specials	
1998	Power Dolls: Project Alpha	Takasu Nami	OAV	
1998	The Doraemons: The Great Operating of Springing Insects!	Yellow Doraemon		
1998	Fancy Lala	Sayaka Futatsugi	Ep. 22	
1998	Martian Successor Nadesico: The Prince of Darkness	Ryoko		
1998	Steam Detectives	Red Scorpion		
1998	Gekigangar 3	Junpei		
1999–2000	Monster Farm	Genki		
1999	Bikkuriman 2000	Shishaku Shobo		
2000	Yu-Gi-Oh! Duel Monsters	Noa Kaiba		
2001	Ask Dr. Rin!	Emika Kanzaki, Shelong		
2001	Fighting Foodons	Crown Natsume		
2002	Beyblade: V-Force	Alan Mackenzie		
2002	Gun Frontier	Shizuku		
2002	Beyblade: Fierce Battle	Hiroshi	feature film	
2002	Petite Princess Yucie	Margazareth		
2002	Monkey Typhoon	Fiore		
2002	Shin Megami Tensei: Devil Children Light & Dark	Landa		
2002	Tenchi Muyo! GXP	Sasami Masaki		
2003	Pokémon: Advanced Challenge	Grace, Rin		
2003	Gunslinger Girl	Franca		
2004	Sgt. Frog	Kiko Katoyama		
2004	Soreike! Zukkoke Sanningumi	Keiko Ando, Atsuko Hino, Miyoko Yamanaka		
2005	Moeyo Ken	Ryunosuke Sakamoto	TV series	
2004	Astroboy Tetsuwan Atom The Glorious Earth	Tiko	short film	
2005	Sugar Sugar Rune	Blanca		
2005	The Snow Queen	Frida		
2006	Humanoid Monster Bem	Oin Ejen		
2012	Hunter x Hunter	Biscuit Krueger		
2012	Is This a Zombie? of the Dead	Yuu (Delusion)	Ep. 6-8	
2013	Hunter x Hunter: The Last Mission	Biscuit Krueger		
2014	Ai Tenchi Muyo!	Sasami		
2014	Hozuki's Coolheadedness	Cookie		
2014	The World is Still Beautiful	Narrator/Tohara		
2014	Hi-sCoool! SeHa Girls	Sakura Shinguji		
2015	Rolling Girls	Ura Kukino	Ep. 10	
2016	Puzzle & Dragons X	Sturgeon		

=== Video games ===
List of voice performances in video games
Year	Series	Role	Notes	Source
1996–2005	Sakura Wars video games	Sakura Shinguji		
1998	Advanced V.G. 2	Yajima Satomi	PlayStation	
1994	Advanced V.G.	Yajima Satomi	PC Engine	
1996	Advanced V.G.	Yajima Satomi	PlayStation	
1997	Anime Freak FX Vol. 4	Tsubasa	PC FX] {Niji no Shoujotai Prism Knights}	
1998	Anime Freak FX Vol. 6	Chisa Yokoyama	PC FX	
2005	Another Century's Episode	Lucrezia Noin, Ryoko Subaru	PS1/PS2	
2006	Another Century's Episode 2	Ryoko Subaru	PS1/PS2	
2007	Another Century's Episode 3: The Final	Ryoko Subaru	PS1/PS2	
1998	Brave Saga	Kotomi	PlayStation	
1996	Der Langrisser	Sherry	PC FX	
2000	Dog of Bay	Vivian	PlayStation 2	
1999	Doki Doki On Air 2	personality	Windows, Mac, PlayStation	
1995	Dōkyūsei	Saito Ako	PC Engine	
1997	Castlevania: Symphony of the Night	Maria Renard	PlayStation	
1996	Extra Bright	Milly Di Toska	PlayStation	
1992–98	Galaxy Fraulein Yuna series	Yuna Kagurazaka		
1995	Gulliver Boy	Misty	PC Engine	
1997	Grander Musashi			
1995	Gussun Oyoyo	Emily	PlayStation	
1999	One: Kagayaku Kisetsu e	Nanase Rumi	PlayStation	
1995	The Legend of Xanadu II	Ryumina	PC-Engine	
1997	Langrisser I and II	Sherry	PlayStation	
1998	Lunar 2: Eternal Blue	Lucia	Sega Saturn	
1994	Lunar: Eternal Blue	Lucia	MegaCD	
1998	Lupin the Third: D2 Manga	Fujiko Mine	Replacing Eiko Masuyama	
1996	Mahou Shoujo Pretty Sammy Part 1: In the Earth	Sasami Kawai / Pretty Sammy	Sega Saturn	
1997	Mahou Shoujo Pretty Sammy Part 2: In the Juraihelm	Sasami Kawai / Pretty Sammy	PlayStation	
1998	Mahou Shoujo Pretty Sammy: Heart no Kimochi	Sasami, Tsunami	Sega Saturn	
1994	Megami Paradise	Rurubell	PC Engine	
1997	Mega Man Legends	Kobun (Servbot)	PS1, PS2	
2000	Mega Man Legends 2	Kobun	PS1, PS2	
1998	Misa no Mahou Monogatari	Kusanagi Asuka	PlayStation	
2002	Moeyo Ken	Ryunosuke Sakamoto	PS1, PS2	
1997	My Dream: On Air ga Matenakute	Watanabe Izumi	PlayStation, Sega Saturn	
1999	Martian Successor Nadesico: The Mission	Ryoko Subaru	Dreamcast	
1997	Martian Successor Nadesico: Yappari Ai ga Katsu?	Ryoko Subaru	Sega Saturn	
1999	The Misadventures of Tron Bonne	Kobun		
1997	Nadesico: The Blank of 3 Years	Ryoko Subaru	Sega Saturn	
2005	Namco x Capcom	Hiromi Tengenji, Kobun		
1998	One: Kagayaku Kisetsu e	Rumi Nanase	PS2	
1998	Pocket Love 2	Momoyo	Game Boy	
1997	Pocket Love	Momoyo	Game Boy	
1992	Prince of Persia	Princess	Sega CD (Japanese Version)	
1992	Princess Maker	daughter	PC Engine	
1993	Ranma 1/2 Byakuran Aika	Arisa Nanjou	MegaCD	
1997	Stand By Say You	Clear	Sega Saturn	
1994	Taisen Puzzle-Dama	Mayu Sawada	PlayStation 1	
1997	Tengai Makyō: Daiyon no Mokushiroku	NPC	Sega Saturn	
1989	Tengai Makyou: Ziria	Tisza		
1997	The Star Bowling		Sega Saturn	
1998	The Star Bowling DX		PlayStation	
2003	Sunrise World War From Sunrise Eiyuutan	Lucretia Noin	PlayStation 2	
1998	Super Robot Taisen F	Noin	PlayStation, Sega Saturn	
1999	Super Robot Taisen F Kanketsuhen	Noin	PlayStation	
2009	Super Robot Wars NEO	Miruku Arara	Wii	
2013	Super Robot Wars Operation Extend		PSP	
1995–97	Tenchi Muyo! video games	Sasami, Tsunami		
1998	Thousand Arms	Nelsha Stylus		
1996	True Love Story	Chiharu Kasuga	PlayStation	
1997	True Love Story: Remember My Heart	Chiharu Kasuga		
1997	Voice Fantasia	Inquire	PlayStation, Sega Saturn	
1999	White Diamond	Ristain	Win	
1991	Wolf Fang: Kuuga 2001 / Rohga: Armor Force	Operator	Arcade	
2012	Project X Zone	Sakura Shinguji, Kobun		
2015	Project X Zone 2	Sakura Shinguji		
2005	Tengai makyō III Namida ja:天外魔境III NAMIDA	Tsugumi		

=== Audio dramas ===
List of voice performances in audio dramas
Series	Role	Notes	Source
Cooking Idol Ai! Mai Main ja:クッキンアイドル アイ!マイ!まいん!	Yuria		
Dragon Quest II CD Theater	Nana	CD	
Galaxy Fraulein Yuna: Galaxy Wave	Yuna Kagurazaka	CD	
Growlanser IV	Furanchixesuka	CD	
Kidou Senkan Nadesico Oshare Club	Subaru Ryoko	CD	
Misa no Mahou Monogatari	Isabelle, Asuka Kusanagi	CD	
NG Knight Ramune & 40 DX	Milk	CD	
Oh My Goddess!	Morisato Megumi	CD	
Pathway for Santa Claus: Santa ga kureta okurimono	girl	CD	
PopFul Mail Paradise 1, 2, 3, 4, 5	Mariru	CD	
Power Dolls	Takasu Nami	radio, CD	
Real Drive	Umuran		
Sakura Wars series	Shinguuji Sakura	CD	
Tenchi Muyo! series	Sasami	CD	
True Love Story series	Kasuga Chiharu		
Kaze no Densetsu Xanadu II Heroine Tachi no Tanjoubi	Ryumina	CD	

=== Dubbing ===
- Clueless, Cher Horowitz (Alicia Silverstone)
- Fly Away Home, Amy Alden (Anna Paquin)
