= Mega Man =

Video game franchise

- The logo for the classic series. Later installments feature their own logo.
- Created by: Akira Kitamura; Keiji Inafune
- Original work: Mega Man (1987)
- Owner: Capcom
- Years: 1987–present

Print publications
- Comics: Mega Man

Films and television
- Television series: Captain N: The Game Master; Mega Man; MegaMan NT Warrior; Mega Man Star Force; Mega Man: Fully Charged; Secret Level

Games
- Video games: List of Mega Man video games

Official website
- megaman.capcom.com

Mega Man (known as Rockman (Note: Japanese: ロックマン, Hepburn: Rokkuman) in Japan) is a video game franchise developed and published by Capcom, featuring the eponymous protagonist. The original game was released for the Nintendo Entertainment System in 1987, and spawned a franchise that expanded to over 50 games on multiple systems. As of July 2026, the series had sold a total of 45 million units worldwide. Mega Man has been popular among gamers and has been reimagined and evolved as a video game character for over 30 years.

The main series, dubbed the "Classic" series, consists of eleven (going on twelve) games, the stand-alone Mega Man & Bass, the spin-off Game Boy series (released in Japan as Rockman World), and various ports, remakes, and compilations. The storyline of the "Classic" series is succeeded by the Mega Man X, Mega Man Zero, Mega Man ZX, and the Mega Man Legends series, all of which set in a single continuity. Two other series, the Mega Man Battle Network and Mega Man Star Force series, take place in an alternate universe where the internet flourished rather than robotics.

== History ==
=== 1987: conception and first game ===
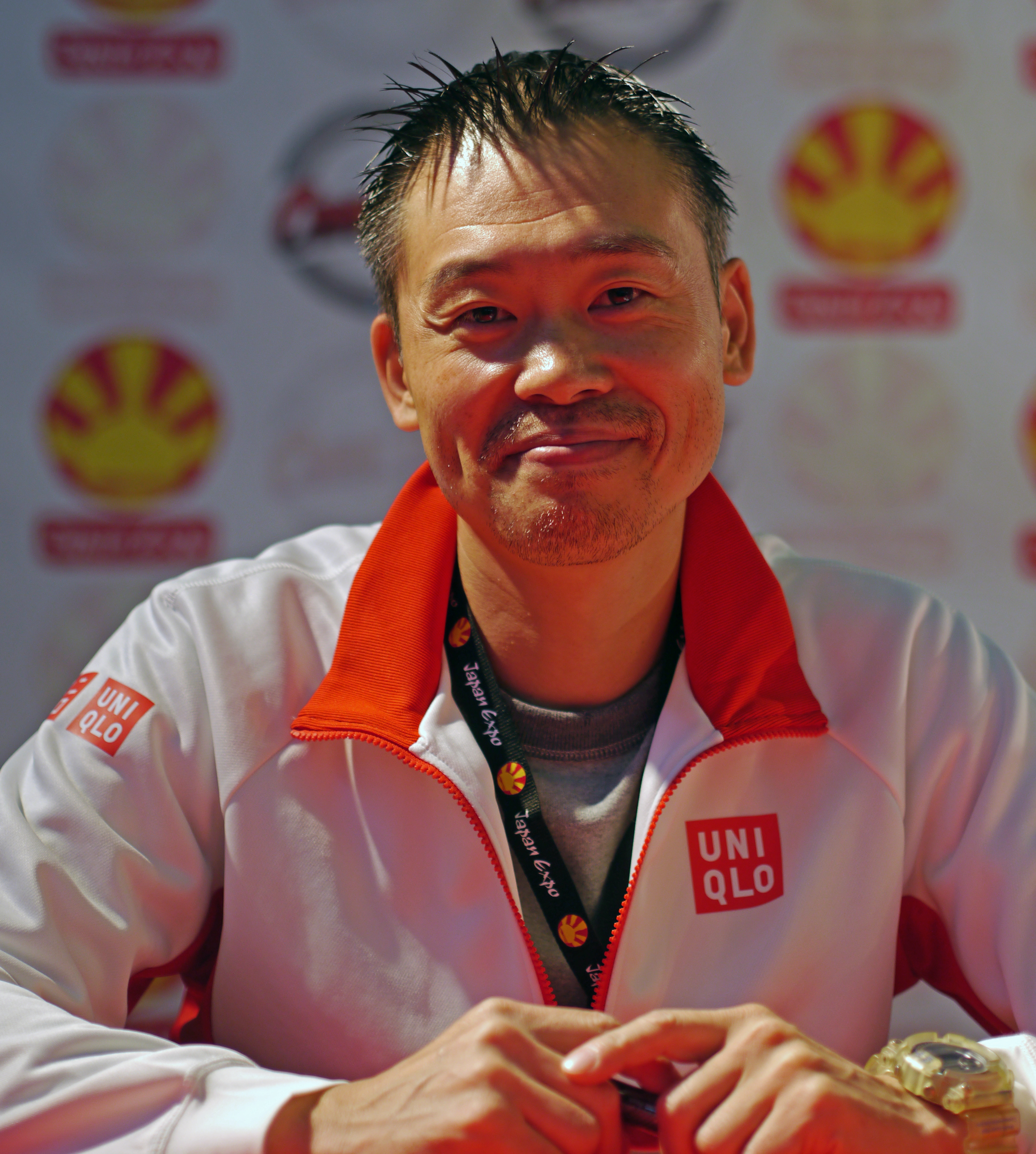
Akira Kitamura in 1991 (left) and Keiji Inafune in 2012 (right); both individuals are responsible for the concept and sprite artwork, and character design of Mega Man respectively

Before Mega Man, Capcom primarily made arcade games, and its console releases were mostly ports of these games. In the mid-1980s, Capcom made plans to develop Mega Man specifically for the Japanese home console market. They decided to bring in fresh, young talent for the small team, including artist Keiji Inafune, a recent college graduate who started on the Street Fighter team. Inafune recalled that the Mega Man development team worked extremely hard to complete the final product, with a project supervisor and lead designer who sought perfection in every possible aspect of the game.

The development team for Mega Man consisted of only six people. Inafune (credited as "Inafking") designed and illustrated nearly all of the game's characters and enemies, and the Japanese Rockman logo, box art, and instruction manual. He was responsible for rendering these designs into graphical sprite form. He said, "We didn't have [a lot of] people, so after drawing character designs, I was actually doing the dotting (pixelation) for the Nintendo. Back then, people weren't specialized and we had to do a lot of different things because there was so few people, so I really ended up doing all the characters." Inafune was influenced by the eponymous protagonist of Osamu Tezuka's manga Astro Boy in his Mega Man designs. Mega Man is colored blue because it seemed that the color had the most shades in the console's 56-color palette (cyan included), and that selection was used to enhance Mega Man's detail.

Although he is often credited for designing the character, Inafune insists that he "only did half of the job in creating him", as his mentor, director Akira Kitamura, developed the basic character concept before Inafune's arrival. The basic sprites for Roll and Dr. Light were created before Inafune joined the project, and the designs for Cut Man, Ice Man, Fire Man, and Guts Man were in process. Aside from normal enemies, Inafune's first character was Elec Man, inspired by American comic book characters. The artist has commented that Elec Man has always been his favorite design. The designs for Dr. Light and Dr. Wily were based on Santa Claus and Albert Einstein, respectively; the latter character was meant to represent an archetypal "mad scientist".

The team had initially considered names such as "Mighty Kid", "Knuckle Kid", and "Rainbow Man" before settling on their final decisions. The "Rainbow" name was considered because the character could change into seven colors based on the weapon selected. The production team chose a music motif when naming the main characters in Mega Man. The protagonist's original name is Rock and his sister's name is Roll, a play on the term "rock and roll". This type of naming would later be extended to many characters throughout the series. One of the original storylines considered by the team but not used in the final game was to have Roll be kidnapped, and Rock had to rescue her. Another idea had included a boss fight against a giant Roll near the end of the game.

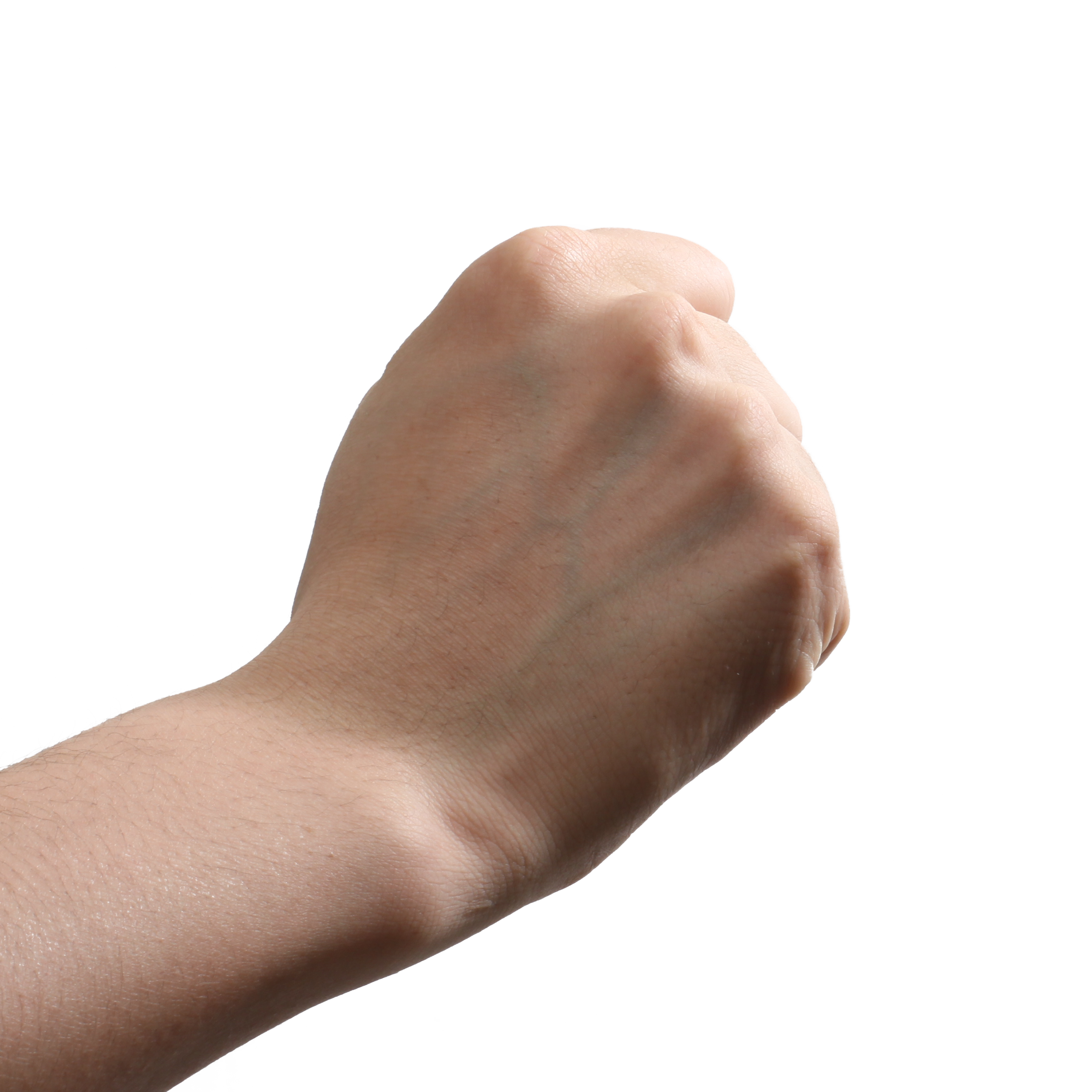
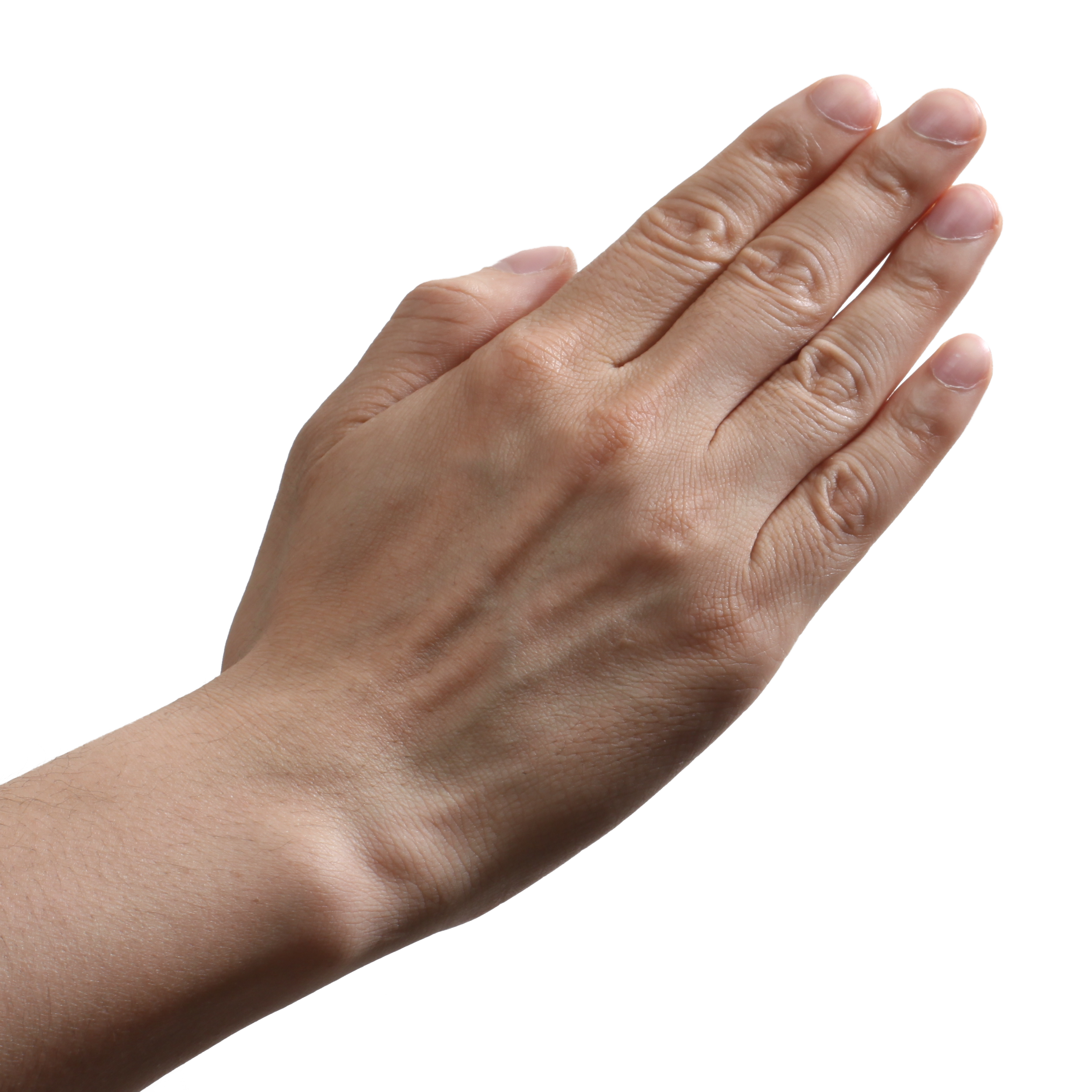
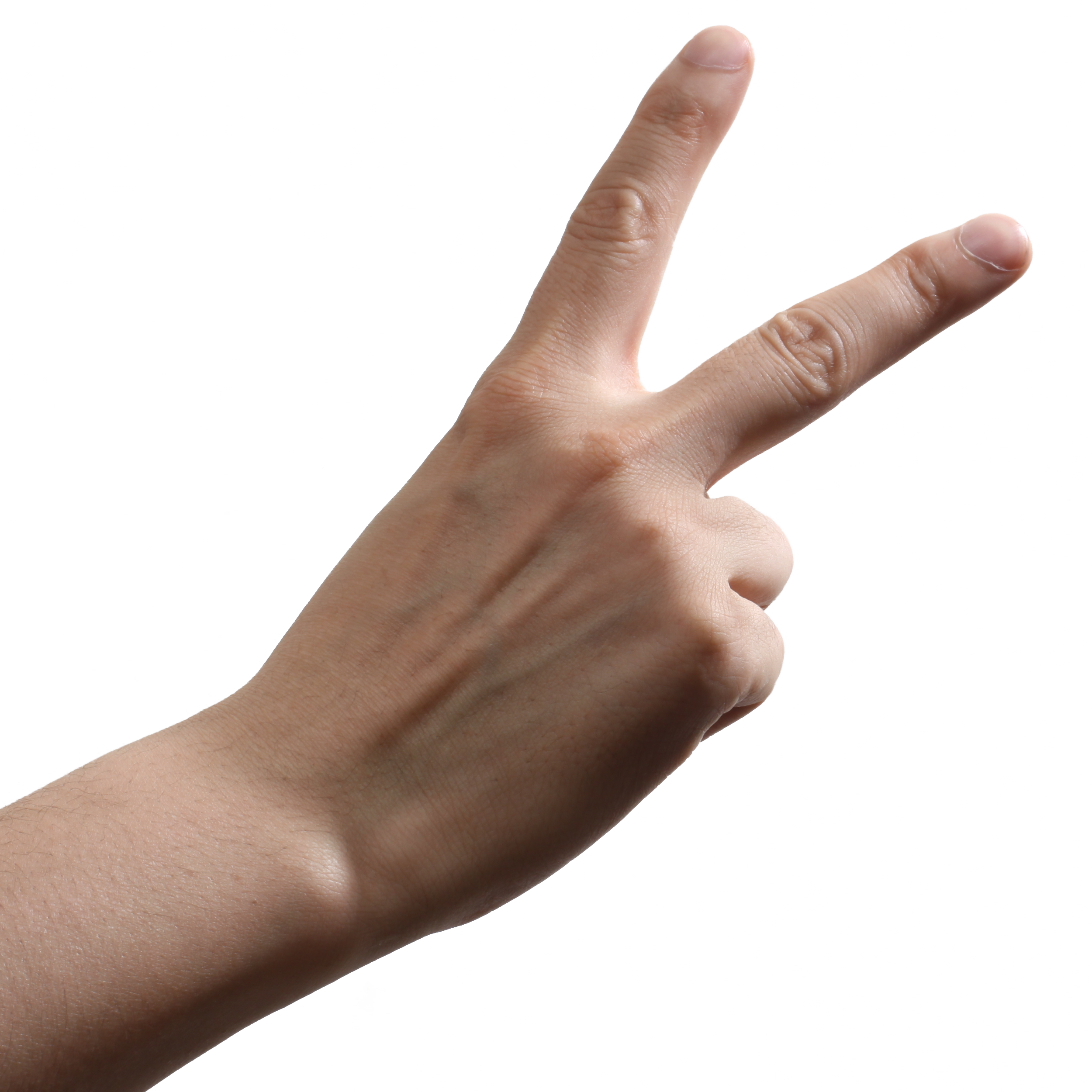
Mega Man's gameplay was inspired by rock paper scissors, where certain bosses are weak to other weapons, e.g. Cut Man is weak to Guts Man's weapon because Guts Man's weapon specializes in picking up and throwing rocks and rock beats scissors.

The team decided to incorporate anime elements for the game's animation. Inafune explained, "[Mega Man's] hand transforms into a gun and you can actually see it come out of his arm. We wanted to make sure that the animation and the motion was realistic and actually made sense. So with Mega Man, we had this perfect blending of game character with animation ideas." The gameplay for Mega Man was inspired by the game rock paper scissors. The project supervisor wanted a simple system that offered "deep gameplay". Each weapon deals a large amount of damage to one specific Robot Master, others have little to no effect against them, and there is no single weapon that dominates all the others. Mega Man was originally able to crouch, but the team decided against it since it made players' ability to determine the height of onscreen projectiles more difficult.Naoya Tomita (credited as "Tom Pon") began work on Mega Man's scenic backgrounds immediately after his Capcom training. Tomita proved himself amongst his peers by overcoming the challenges of the console's limited power through maximizing the use of background elements.

Mega Man was scored by Manami Matsumae (credited as "Chanchacorin Manami"), who composed the music, created the sound effects, and programmed the data in three months, using a sound driver programmed by Yoshihiro Sakaguchi (credited as "Yuukichan's Papa"). The musical notes were translated one by one into the computer language. Matsumae was challenged by the creative limits of three notes available at any one time, and when she was unable to write songs, she created the sound effects.

When the game was localized for distribution in America, Capcom changed the title of the game from Rockman to Mega Man. This moniker was created by Capcom's then-Senior Vice President Joseph Morici, who claimed it was changed merely because he did not like the original name. "That title was horrible," Morici said. "So I came up with Mega Man, and they liked it enough to keep using it for the U.S. games." 1UP.com's Nadia Oxford attributed this change to Capcom's belief that American children would be more interested in a game with the latter title.

Capcom's sales department originally believed that the game would not sell, but after Japan had received limited quantities, it had been seen as successful enough to quickly commission an American localization. With little overseas press coverage save for a full-page advertisement in Nintendo Fun Club News, sales gained momentum over word of mouth, making the game a sleeper hit.

=== 1988–1990: Mega Man 2 & 3, and Kitamura's departure ===
Mega Man was not a large commercial accomplishment for Capcom at the time. According to Roy Ozaki, director Akira Kitamura had wanted to make a sequel to Mega Man, but producer Tokuro Fujiwara was against it. Kitamura then sought permission from Capcom's vice president at the time to make the game. The development team were given permission to develop a sequel on the condition that they work concurrently on other projects as well. The staff spent their own time on the project to improve upon the original by adding more levels and weapons, as well as improving graphics. The project supervisor of the first Mega Man invited Keiji Inafune to the sequel's development crew, as Inafune was working on a separate game at the time. On the previous game, Inafune worked as an artist and character designer but became more involved in the production process of the sequel. "Working on [Mega Man 2] marked my second year at this, and I even got to mentor a 'new kid', which opened up a whole new world of stress for me," Inafune recounted. The development time for the game was only three to four months.

Mega Man 2 was a huge success and received critical acclaim. Since its 1988 release, Mega Man 2 has sold over 1.51 million copies worldwide, becoming the second highest selling in the entire Mega Man franchise.

Development on Mega Man 3 began at Capcom over a year after the release of Mega Man 2. Akira Kitamura, the lead supervisor for the first two games quit his job at the company during that gap of time. Keiji Inafune considered Mega Man 3 as one of his least favorite entries in the series due to "[...] what went into the game and what was behind the release of the game." He had "preset notions" about successful development because of the team's good experience with Mega Man 2 and found that his new superior "didn't really understand Mega Man the way his predecessor did". During the game's production, the developers lost the main planner, so Inafune had to take over that job for its completion. Inafune recalled the final two months of development as particularly turbulent, when he had to take responsibility for assessing and dividing up tasks among the team members who were not meeting deadlines. The team was forced to put Mega Man 3 on the market before they thought it was ready, releasing it in September instead of the series' usual arrivals in December. Inafune concluded, "I knew that if we had more time to polish it, we could do a lot of things better, make it a better game, but the company said that we needed to release it. The whole environment behind what went into the production of the game is what I least favored. Numbers one and two – I really wanted to make the games; I was so excited about them. Number three – it just turned very different."

Despite the turbulent development cycle, Mega Man 3 received positive reviews and sales. Since its 1990 release, Mega Man 3 has sold over one million copies worldwide.

=== 1993–2000: 16 and 32-bit era – Mega Man X and Mega Man Legends ===
The success of the Mega Man series allowed Capcom to continue releasing NES titles well into the 16-bit era. A teaser for an SNES incarnation of the Mega Man series first made its way into a preview of Mega Man 6 in the spring 1993 issue of the Japanese Club Capcom fan magazine. The tentatively titled "Super Mega Man" was originally to have a "fairly large memory configuration and a battery backup"..

Mega Man X was announced in North America in a March 1993 Game Players magazine interview with Capcom's Senior Vice President Joseph Morici, marking the beginning of the Mega Man X subseries. Mega Man X was developed by a team at Capcom which had worked on the long-running Mega Man series for the NES. Keiji Inafune recounted that the development of Mega Man X required a lot of brainstorming for its storyline and content, where the team's goal was to branch out from the original Mega Man games while still maintaining their fundamentals. Mega Man X has met with positive reviews for its gameplay, sound, and graphics, as well as its attempt to augment the franchise. Several websites retrospectively held Mega Man X as a successful milestone in transitioning the Mega Man series from its increasingly stale existence on the NES to the SNES. The success of the game led to the development of future Mega Man X titles and the concept of subseries within the Mega Man franchise.

One of the earliest global showings of Mega Man Legends occurred at the Electronic Entertainment Expo in Atlanta, Georgia, in June 1997, where it was titled Mega Man Neo. A demo of the game, titled "Rockman Neo" (ロックマンNEO), was later included in the Japanese director's cut version of Resident Evil. Keiji Inafune stated that his goal was to create a new Mega Man game that would be entirely different from previous entries in the series. Aiming to appeal to gamers of all ages, Inafune decided to blend action, RPG, and adventure genres, though he questioned whether the game would still be engaging. All the humanoid characters in the game were animated using motion capture, a first in the franchise.

In December 1997, Capcom USA's president, Bill Gardner, informed IGN that Mega Man Legends would be ported to the Nintendo 64. Although the Japanese name had already been finalized, "Mega Man Neo" remained as the English title, with Gardner stating that the official name had not yet been decided. In January 1998, the game was renamed "Mega Man Nova" due to a general consensus that the previous name was not appealing. However, just two weeks later, the name was reverted due to trademark issues. The final title, Mega Man Legends, was confirmed in March 1998. By April 1998, the English adaptation of the game had been completed, but Capcom chose to delay its release until September of the same year, believing it would perform better during the holiday season.

The game was released in Japan on December 18, 1997, with a re-release under the "PlayStation the Best" label following on May 4, 1999. The game received moderately positive reviews, spawning one spin-off and a sequel.

=== 2000–2008: handheld gaming era – Mega Man Zero, Mega Man Battle Network, Mega Man ZX, and Mega Man Star Force ===
As the series continues to grow, Keiji Inafune rose in the ranks at Capcom, allowing him to supervise more games and allow continued development of Mega Man games, which has transitioned into an annualized release.

In 2001, Mega Man Battle Network was released on the Game Boy Advance (GBA). Initially conceptualized with the intention of being a horror game, Mega Man Battle Network was developed by Capcom Production Studio 2 amidst the success of Nintendo's portable RPG franchise Pokémon. Rather than extend upon the traditional action-platform formula for the Mega Man series as they had done with the 3D Mega Man Legends, Capcom followed Nintendo's example on the latter's then-newest handheld console, the GBA. While creating Battle Network, director Masahiro Yasuma found difficulty in blending action attributes with "the kind of fun you get from a Pokémon game" in order to make it enjoyable, new, and fresh. Yasuma recalled that production was further challenged because no effective precursor of its type had been made before. Producer Keiji Inafune stated that the development team wanted to add a "real world" feel to the Mega Man series by placing the protagonist of Battle Network in a location where the internet is prevalent. With the release of the portable GBA, the team felt that they should target modern gamers, specifically children, as an audience for the new series. The developers thought such a theme would be both successful and relevant because these younger gamers grew up with and utilized such technology on a daily basis. To ensure the game's popularity, Capcom marketed Battle Network alongside an afternoon anime adaptation, emphasized head-to-head matches between players, and provided fans with exclusive content via special events. Mega Man Battle Network received positive reviews and a huge cult following, resulting in the Mega Man Battle Network subseries and the creation of an alternate timeline to accommodate the subseries. The last mainline entry of the series, Mega Man Battle Network 6 was released in 2005.

In 2002, Mega Man Zero was released, also on the Game Boy Advance (GBA). This title was developed by Inti Creates, a company established in 1996 by several former members of Capcom, who were given a free rein on its design and premise. The game was produced by Inti Creates president Takuya Aizu and was co-directed by Ryota Ito and Capcom's Yoshinori Kawano. Inafune signed on as the game's co-producer. The goal for the developers was to make Mega Man Zero the most challenging out of all the games in the franchise up to that point. The gameplay model and characters act as extensions of the Mega Man X series, which itself expands upon the original Mega Man series. Zero, a supporting character in the Mega Man X series, was chosen to be the lead protagonist.

After its release, Mega Man Zero received acclaim for its gameplay, difficulty, and presentation. The success of the title led to three sequels, widely considered to be amongst the best Mega Man games ever made within the community, with its final entry, Mega Man Zero 4 marking the end of the Zero storyline.

The successes of both Mega Man Battle Network and Mega Man Zero led to the development of successors of both subserieses. In 2006, Mega Man ZX and Mega Man Star Force were released on the Nintendo DS. Mega Man ZX received positive reviews, leading to the development of a sequel, Mega Man ZX Advent. Conversely, Mega Man Star Force received mixed reception. Despite this Mega Man Star Force would receive two sequels, with the final entry, Mega Man Star Force 3 concluding the Star Force trilogy.

=== 2008–2010: Mega Man 9 and Mega Man 10 ===
Despite the continued release of Mega Man titles, sales and media reception have slowly dwindled. Over the years, news of several Mega Man projects being cancelled surfaced, including Mega Man Star Force 4, and Mega Man ZXC, the latter of which was cancelled in favor of the development of Mega Man 9.

As early as 2004, Keiji Inafune publicly expressed his desire to make a Mega Man 9 as a "throwback to the super old school", but that its creation would highly depend on the input of fans. According to Inafune, the simple fun of a classic Mega Man game "doesn't fit into the grandiose and expansive world that the consumer gaming industry has become, and so you have to make games that match the current expectations". He also believed that pushing for the creation of a Mega Man in the style of the original "would be quickly criticized for things like being simplistic, outdated, or too expensive", thus making it too difficult to develop such games in the current climate. Inafune cited the rise of retrogaming services like Nintendo's Virtual Console for allowing the development team to put together Mega Man 9. Not only does the game carry the gameplay and storyline elements of older games, Mega Man 9 is a return to the series' roots, as the graphics and music resemble how their original games looked and sounded on the NES's 8-bit hardware. Inafune felt that the "time was right" for choosing this style of game to please its fans.

Co-developed by Capcom and Inti Creates, Mega Man 9 was released digitally in September 2008 to positive acclaim and success. The reception led to the development of Mega Man 10, also utilizing the throwback 8-bit style. Upon its release in 2010, it was also received positively, but was criticized for its lack of innovation.

=== 2010–2017: Inafune's departure and franchise hiatus ===
On October 29, 2010, Keiji Inafune announced on his blog that he would be leaving Capcom with the intention of "starting his life over". He had been with the company for 23 years. At the time of his departure, numerous Mega Man games have been announced and being worked on, including Mega Man Universe, Maverick Hunter, and Mega Man Legends 3. His departure led to the cancellation of these titles and left his position as Producer on the Mega Man series vacant, leading to an eight-year long hiatus of the franchise. During this period, numerous smaller titles and collaborations were released, including the officially licensed fan-game Street Fighter X Mega Man, and a guest appearance in Street Fighter X Tekken.

In 2015, Capcom released Mega Man Legacy Collection, a re-release of the original 6 entries of the Classic Mega Man series. In 2017, Capcom released Mega Man Legacy Collection 2, featuring the remaining four mainline entries of the Classic series.

=== 2017–present: franchise return and new direction ===
Speculation about a revival of the series began with concept arts gradually shown throughout 2017, the first as Roll's new design for her Nendoroid figure, and the second of Mega Man's new weapon design appearing as an easter egg in the Mega Man Legacy Collection 2's gallery, under the Mega Man 8 section.

On December 4, 2017, Mega Man 11 was officially announced during the live stream celebrating the 30th Anniversary of the Mega Man franchise. The livestream also announced that Capcom Producer Kazuhiro Tsuchiya has taken over as the lead Producer of the Mega Man franchise, alongside the game's director, Koji Oda. The announcement marked the end of the franchise's eight-year hiatus. Mega Man 11 features 3D polygonal characters and hand-drawn environments, departing from the pixel art-based approach from previous games, and is displayed in 2.5D. According to Tsuchiya and Oda, the departure of Inafune was mainly the reason for the long hiatus of a new game, as there was a huge hesitation for anyone to step up and become "the new Mega Man guy" up until Oda himself did so. Mega Man 11 was released on October 2, 2018 worldwide to positive acclaim, and as of 2025, it is the best-selling game in the franchise. Also in 2018, Capcom announced the release of Mega Man X Legacy Collection, a collection of all the mainline Mega Man X games. It was released in two volumes on July 24, 2018.

In 2019, Capcom announced Mega Man X Dive, a mobile spin-off of the Mega Man X series developed by Capcom Taiwan and published by Capcom in Asia and Nebulajoy in other territories. The game was released on March 24, 2020, in Asian territories, followed by a gradual rollout of the game to the rest of the world. Following an end-of-service announcement, Capcom announced an offline version of the game to be released on mobile and Steam on September 1, 2023. The game officially ended service in Asia and Japan on September 27, 2023, followed by the closure of the game for the remaining regions in 2024. In 2020, Capcom released Mega Man Zero/ZX Legacy Collection, a collection of all entries of both Mega Man Zero and Mega Man ZX series. It was released on February 25, 2020, followed by the Japanese release two days later.

On June 28, 2022, at the Nintendo Direct livestream presentation, Capcom announced Mega Man Battle Network Legacy Collection, featuring all six mainline Battle Network games and their corresponding versions. It is released in two volumes the following year on April 14, 2023. On May 30, 2023, Kazuhiro Tsuchiya announced his departure from Capcom. On September 12, 2025, Capcom announced Mega Man Star Force Legacy Collection during a Japanese Nintendo Direct broadcast. The collection was released on March 27, 2026.

On December 8, 2025, Capcom published their annual Integrated Report, which outlines plans to expand some of their underutilized IPs, specifically referring Mega Man as one such example that they wanted to "regrow back into being one of their 'core IPs'". Later that week, at the 2025 Game Awards, Capcom officially announced Mega Man: Dual Override, the twelfth mainline entry in the Classic Mega Man series, and the first mainline entry in the franchise since Mega Man 11 (2018), set to be released in 2027. On March 5, 2026, Capcom, via its "Capcom Spotlight" program, publicly announced Shingo Izumi, previously the producer of the Star Force Legacy Collection, and was mentioned in the credits of the series' segment of the anthology series Secret Level, as the new Megaman producer, succeeding Tsuchiya.

== Games ==
=== Original series ===
Mega Man is shown battling mini-boss Hanabiran from Mega Man 9 in Hornet Man's stage. Note the run-and-gun and platform gameplay.

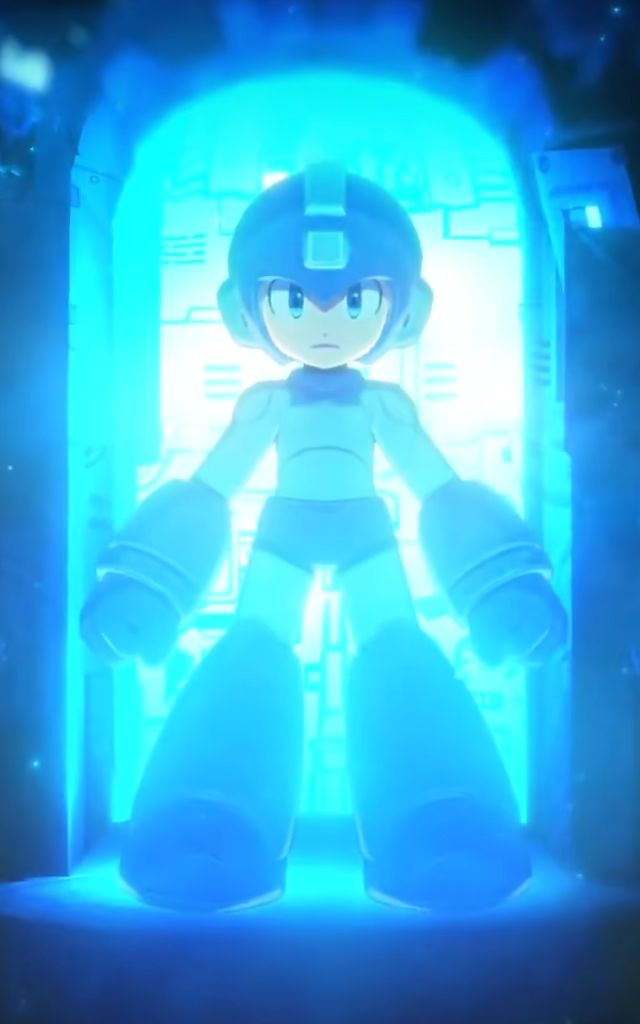
Mega Man, as seen in the teaser trailer for Mega Man: Dual Override.

The original Mega Man series, in modern days dubbed Classic Mega Man, marks the start of the franchise, released on the NES on December 17, 1987. In the original series, Mega Man is an android originally named Rock (nicknamed "Mega" in later installments), created as a lab assistant by the scientist Dr. Light alongside his sister Roll. One day, after Dr. Wily reprogrammed most of Dr. Light's robots, Rock volunteered to be converted into a fighting robot to defend the world from Wily's violent robotic threats, thus becoming Mega Man.

Mega Man is a side-scrolling action platformer. The player character must fight through the levels using Mega Man's "Mega Buster"—a cannon attached to his arm—to shoot the robotic enemies inhabiting his environment. When Mega Man was released in 1987, the characteristic that made it revolutionary was the choice given to the player of which robot master to attempt first. After defeating a Robot Master—the boss of a level—Mega Man gains the ability to use that Robot Master's special weapon. Each Robot Master represents a specific element or object, with bosses such as Fire Man, Ice Man, Guts Man, Cut Man, Elec Man, and Bomb Man. The weapons Mega Man gains share the theme of the defeated boss. After defeating all of the Robot Masters, Mega Man travels to a multi-stage fortress to confront Dr. Wily, the person responsible for the robotic enemies' destructive acts. In the fortress, Mega Man fights new bosses, clones of the game's Robot Masters, and Wily himself, who is usually in a large multi-phase war machine.

Enemies are weak to at least one weapon; for instance, Fire Man will take more damage from Ice Man's weapon than from other weapons. This concept draws inspiration from rock-paper-scissors. Robot Master levels can generally be completed in any order, resulting in a strategic hallmark of the series: determining the best order to defeat bosses and earn weapons. Sequels of Mega Man games contain new enemies alongside familiar ones, new bosses, new weapons, and occasionally new gadgets that Mega Man could use. Mega Man 3 introduced Rush, a robot dog companion for Mega Man, and later installments would provide Rush with additional abilities for Mega Man to use. Mega Man 3 and 4 gave Mega Man the ability to slide and charge his buster, respectively, though he was unable to use these abilities in Mega Man 9 and 10. Later installments of the series give the player the option of commanding other player characters, such as Proto Man and Bass.

The Classic series has yet to reach a definite conclusion. Originally developed for the NES, the original Mega Man series experienced graphical improvements in fourth and fifth-generation installments. The series had no games developed for sixth-generation consoles but returned in the seventh generation purposely sporting graphics, sound, and gameplay similar to the original NES games to inspire a nostalgic look and feel, distributed as downloadable content instead of retail games like the previous installments.

On December 4, 2017, Capcom announced that a new game in the classic series, Mega Man 11, would be released in late 2018. Unlike Mega Man 9 and 10, this game makes a return to the modern era, featuring Mega Man in a 2.5D environment, with 3D cel-shaded graphics, and is presented in a widescreen aspect ratio. When using a special weapon, in addition to changing colors, Mega Man's armor also changes appearance. On December 11, 2025, a twelfth entry in the classic series, Mega Man: Dual Override was announced at The Game Awards 2025, with its release year set for 2027.

=== Mega Man X ===
Capcom wanted a redesign in graphics and control as the Mega Man series moved from the NES to the SNES, prompting the creation of the Mega Man X series in 1993. Set years in the future, this series follows the story of Mega Man's successor, X, a new advanced robot that has complete free will over his actions, thoughts and feelings. X, a creation of Dr. Light, was put into suspended animation and uncovered 100 years in the future by a researcher named Dr. Cain. X is used as a template to mass produce other similarly sentient androids, dubbed "Reploids", and X subsequently joins a peacekeeping organization called the Maverick Hunters, who are employed to track down and eliminate Reploids that become violent, or "go Maverick". The Mavericks X fights in the games are generally influenced and commanded by Sigma, the former leader of the Maverick Hunters who went Maverick himself.

The Mega Man X series features more detailed 16-bit graphics and greater freedom of movement. In the Mega Man X series, the characters grow in abilities and power as the game progresses. While the gameplay loop and combat is largely similar to the Classic Mega Man series, Mega Man X series differs with its increased emphasis on mobility, with X being able to dash, jump up walls, and acquire various armors, as well as its more mature story than its predecessor. As the series progressed, various other player characters have appeared, such as Zero, a fellow Maverick Hunter and the final creation of Dr. Wily, and Axl, a Reploid with an adolescent personality who has the ability to shape-shift into other Reploids. Zero would later star in his own spin-off series, Mega Man Zero.

The series was originally intended to conclude with Mega Man X5, whose ending was intended to lead into the Mega Man Zero series. However, as Inafune began work on the Zero series, the Mega Man X series was continued by Capcom without his supervision, leading to three additional entries and causing confusion in the games' official timeline. Mega Man X8 ended with a cliffhanger and the series went on hiatus afterwards, leaving it without a conclusion.

A role-playing game spin-off, Mega Man X: Command Mission, was released on July 29, 2004. It was developed by Capcom Production Studio 3, who previously worked on the Breath of Fire series. The game takes place 100 years after the events of the Mega Man X series and follows X, Zero, and Axl as they take part in a resistance on an artificial island against its oppressors and uncover a conspiracy within the Maverick Hunters. Due to the game being mostly independent from the rest of the series, it is unclear whether or not the game's story is a canon part of the franchise's overall continuity.

A mobile game spin-off, Rockman X DiVE, was developed and published by Capcom Taiwan and was released on March 24, 2020, in Asia, in Japan on October 26, 2022, and globally on August 16, 2021, with the latter release published by NebulaJoy. The Steam version of the game was released in Asian territories by Capcom Taiwan on September 15, 2021. The game is a meta-narrative, taking place within a cyberspace database called the Deep Log which contains data from all games in the Mega Man X series, along with the experiences of players all around the world. The game follows the Player, and RiCO, the latest administrator of the Deep Log, welcoming the Player and enlisting their help in clearing up the glitches plaguing the database. The Asian and Japanese servers of the game were shut down on September 27, 2023, followed by the global servers on July 30, 2024. An offline version of the game, Mega Man X DiVE Offline, was released on September 1, 2023.

=== Mega Man Zero ===
In 2002, a follow-up series to the Mega Man X franchise was developed for the Game Boy Advance by Inti Creates. Taking place roughly one hundred years after the events of the Mega Man X series, the new series stars Zero, X's Maverick Hunter ally. The series is set following the "Elf Wars", an apocalyptic conflict that wiped out most of civilization. The survivors have primarily settled in a massive city-state called Neo Arcadia, whose society is based on human supremacy and is ruled by a replica of X. In the midst of an energy crisis, Reploids are indiscriminately labelled Mavericks and terminated, leading to the formation of a Reploid resistance group dubbed "The Resistance". Zero is awakened from suspended animation by the Resistance's commander, a young human scientist named Ciel, and joins the Resistance to fight against Neo Arcadia. Zero variously comes into conflict with Copy X; Dr. Weil, the megalomaniacal scientist who instigated the Elf Wars; and the Dark Elf, a sentient computer program that was corrupted by Dr. Weil.

In the Mega Man Zero series, the gameplay is largely similar to Zero's play style in the later Mega Man X games, featuring a greater emphasis on close-quarters hack-and-slash gameplay, in contrast with Mega Man X's ranged combat. Aside from his traditional "Z-Buster" and "Z-Saber," Zero also has access to a handful of additional weapons, such as a throwable shield, an extendable spear, and a set of tonfas. In the fourth game, Zero can also physically steal weapons from enemies. The Mega Man Zero series also features an in-depth ranking system that rewards the player with new abilities and enhancements in exchange for better play performance, such as copying techniques from defeated bosses.

With its fourth installment, Mega Man Zero became the first series in the franchise to reach a definitive conclusion.

=== Mega Man ZX ===
The Mega Man ZX series debuted in 2006 for Nintendo DS, once again developed by Inti Creates, and chronologically takes place 200 years after the Mega Man Zero series. In this series, progression has led to the equality of humankind and robotkind. Humans are given the physical advantages of robots, and robots are also given biological lifespans. With equality achieved, the world enters a new era of peace. The series follows multiple protagonists as they become involved in a new incident called the "Game of Destiny", in which people who were chosen with the powers of a "Biometal", called a "Mega Man", are pitted against each other to see who was worthy of ruling the world.

The gameplay for Mega Man ZX is similar to the Mega Man Zero series, with an emphasis on close-quarter combat. The player is given the choice of choosing a male or female human protagonist in each installment, a first in the franchise. New to the series is the interconnected Metroidvania-esque world that encourages exploration and replay value, and the ability to collect "Biometals", which are central to the story. "Biometals" contains data on the legendary heroes of the past (including X, Zero, and the Four Guardians from the Zero series). Using these Biometals, the protagonists are able to transform (or "Mega-Merge", in the English releases) and use the powers of these heroes. In the second game, 2007's Mega Man ZX Advent, the player character is also able to transform into boss characters upon defeating them, which allows them to access previously inaccessible areas.

A third game, code-named Mega Man ZXC, was under development around 2008. However, due to ZX and ZX Advent selling poorly, it was cancelled by Capcom's decision in favor of developing Mega Man 9. As such, since ZX Advent ended in a cliffhanger, the series has not received a proper conclusion.

=== Mega Man Legends ===
Beginning on the PlayStation in 1997, a 3D action game series called Mega Man Legends was created to take advantage of the console's advanced graphics hardware. The Legends series is set thousands of years in the future, where the world is covered by immense bodies of water, and humanity as we know it is extinct. In its place, Carbons, artificial humans, roam what was left of the world. The story follows Mega Man (Rock) Volnutt, a relic hunter called a "Digger" who scavenges various ruins throughout the world in search of refractor shards that can be mined and traded as currency. Mega Man Legends brings the gameplay into 3D and is an action-adventure game with third-person shooting role-playing elements.

The Legends series was left on a cliffhanger, with only two main games and a spin-off starring mainstay antagonist Tron Bonne before being discontinued. A continuation to the Legends series has become an oft-requested game among many Capcom and Mega Man fans, as Mega Man Legends 2 ended with a cliffhanger that received criticism from both fans and critics. A third game was once under development for the Nintendo 3DS, but on July 17, 2011, Capcom canceled the project, saying it did not meet certain requirements. This decision was met with criticism from fans and gaming news outlets.

Despite many years having passed since the last new release in the series, various characters from the Legends series consistently appear in Capcom cross-over games such as Marvel vs. Capcom, and the Servbot characters have become iconic within the Capcom community, making many cameo appearances in non-Mega Man games, including Dead Rising and as part of the outfit obtained via achievements in Lost Planet 2.

=== Mega Man Battle Network ===
Mega Man Battle Network, a series primarily on the Game Boy Advance, began in 2001 as a way for the Mega Man games to branch out into the role-playing video game market and to celebrate Mega Man's 15th anniversary. This series features a Net Navi called MegaMan.EXE. NetNavis acts as virtual assistants to Operators, such as the protagonist Lan Hikari, an elementary school student and a future hero who uses his Net Navi to help battle computer viruses and other Internet-based threats. The game combines real-time strategy, role-playing, and collectible card games to create a unique fast-paced battle system. Players and enemies are placed in a 6x3 grid, with each side usually occupying 3x3 of the space. Players must select Battle Chips from a select few from a folder deck, and once selected, the game switches to real-time as the player must move to dodge enemy attacks while attacking at the same time using said Battle Chips. Once the Custom Gauge is full, the player is able to select new chips from the deck.

An anime series, MegaMan NT Warrior, was also produced, ending with 209 episodes and a 50-minute film adaptation. A spin-off game Mega Man Network Transmission, was released in 2003. It is the only entry in the series released on a home console rather than a handheld, and takes place chronologically between the first two Battle Network games. It is also different from other games in the Battle Network universe as the game plays similarly to the Classic Mega Man series with several Battle Network elements.

Along with the anime and games, Mega Man Battle Network had toys mainly based on the Advanced PET from the series, the user would buy a starter pack which included 3 battle chips, and an Advanced PET, the toy came in three colors, Red (based on ProtoMan.EXE), Black (based on Bass.EXE) and Blue (based on MegaMan.EXE). Several battle chip expansion packs were also released, when the toy was discontinued, a total of 333 Battle Chips were released. The toy could be linked together via a link cable with another Advanced PET to battle each other. With the series' sixth installment, Battle Network was the second series in the franchise to reach a definitive conclusion.

=== Mega Man Star Force ===
A follow-up to the Mega Man Battle Network series and released on the Nintendo DS, the Star Force series marks the 20th anniversary of the Mega Man franchise. Star Force takes place roughly 200 years after the events of Battle Network, where network technology has progressed with electromagnetic wave technology to connect the world via radio waves. The series follows a boy named Geo Stelar, who lost his father after a space incident, and Omega-Xis, an extraterrestrial EM-wave fugitive arriving on Earth. The two transform into an EM-Human being known as "Mega Man," and as they explore both the real world and the EM-world, they face off against malicious EM-beings like Omega-Xis merging with other humans for their malicious intentions.

The Star Force games are similar to the Battle Network games, in which players must use a select number of Battle Cards on a folder deck to attack enemies. However, unlike Battle Network, combat takes place in 3D space, with most of the grid occupied by enemies, and the player having only a 1x3 grid to move, making combat much faster-paced and focusing more on player reflexes and quick-reaction time from an opening. To compensate, the collectible card system has been simplified, and players were given the "Mega Attack" ability which allows the player to lock on and move straight to the enemy to attack, and a regenerating shield that can deflect most attacks.

Like Battle Network, multiple merchandise and toys have been created for this series, such as add-on accessories for the Nintendo DS, as well as physical Battle Cards that can be used in-game. An anime based on this series began airing on TV Tokyo in October 2006 for 76 episodes. A remake of the first Battle Network game, "Operate Shooting Star", features crossover content between Battle Network and Star Force and was released exclusively in Japan in 2009.

The Star Force series received lukewarm reception from critics, who were disappointed by its lack of evolution from the Mega Man Battle Network series, criticizing the lack of innovation in its gameplay, graphics and concepts, and was not as commercially successful as its predecessor. While the first game had some commercial success, the reception for the next two games remained lackluster, especially for Mega Man Star Force 2 and sales declined. Because of low sales, a fourth game, which was halfway through development, was canceled. It has since gained a cult following in its later years. With the series' third installment completing the story arc which started in the first game, Star Force became the third series in the Mega Man franchise to have a proper conclusion.

=== Rockman Xover ===
Rockman Xover (ロックマン Xover Rokkuman Kurosuōbā, pronounced as Rockman Cross-over) is a game for Apple's iOS platform. The game marks the 25th anniversary of the Mega Man franchise and was released on November 29, 2012, on the Hong Kong iTunes Store. The game features a new protagonist, OVER-1 (オーバー ワン Ōbā Wan), a Reploid created by Dr. Light and Dr. Cossack, as he travels confronting villains from the entire Mega Man franchise, who have crossed between dimensions to join forces. The game received largely negative reviews from Japanese players, prompting Capcom to cancel the game's North American release. The game ceased operations on March 31, 2015.

== In other media ==
=== In other video games ===
Various incarnations of Mega Man appear as playable fighters in the Marvel vs. Capcom series. The original was a playable fighter in Marvel vs. Capcom: Clash of Super Heroes and Marvel vs. Capcom 2: New Age of Heroes. He is assisted by his companion robots, Rush, Beat and Eddie. His sister robot, Roll, is also playable in both games, but is a secret character in the first game. Although he did not make a playable appearance in Marvel vs. Capcom 3: Fate of Two Worlds, and its successor, Ultimate Marvel vs. Capcom 3, Zero from Mega Man X and Tron Bonne from Mega Man Legends appear as representatives for the series. X appears as an alternate costume for Zero and Frank West and as a card in Heroes and Heralds mode. The original Mega Man appears in the arcade endings of Thor and Nova, and also appears on a poster in the Days of Future Past stage, and finally, as another card in Heroes and Heralds Mode. X and Zero appear as playable characters in Marvel vs. Capcom: Infinite, with Sigma appearing as both a DLC fighter and a major antagonist in the Story Mode, where he merges with the supervillain Ultron to become Ultron Sigma.

MegaMan.EXE and Zero both appear as bonus playable characters in the fighting game Onimusha Blade Warriors, while a different version of Mega Man, based on his appearance on the American box art of the first game, appears as a playable fighter in the PlayStation 3 and PlayStation Vita versions of Street Fighter X Tekken. Mega Man Volnutt and Roll also make an appearance in Tatsunoko vs. Capcom, with Zero added to the international release. In 2014, Mega Man appeared as a playable character in Super Smash Bros. for Nintendo 3DS and Wii U and its sequel, Super Smash Bros. Ultimate. An amiibo based on his appearance was confirmed on November 11, and can be utilized in Super Smash Bros. as well as Mario Kart 8 where it can be scanned to unlock a costume for the player's Mii based on Mega Man's. In Super Mario Maker, the player can unlock a Mega Man costume by scanning the character's amiibo.

In Monster Hunter: World, Mega Man is a wearable costume for the player's palico through downloadable content. Mega Man and Proto Man are set to be released as downloadable content for Sonic Racing: CrossWorlds, alongside a race track based on Wily's Castle.

=== Animated appearances ===
Mega Man's first television appearances were produced for the American market and were based on the classic series. First was Captain N: The Game Master (1989–91), a show that took place in a universe that was made up of many different Nintendo games. It featured Mega Man as a main character and also featured Dr. Wily as one of the antagonists. This was followed by Mega Man (1994–95), the first series to be based in the Mega Man universe.

Mega Man next appeared in several anime produced in Japan, including the first productions to be based on one of the series' spinoffs. First was Mega Man: Upon a Star, a three-part OVA based on the classic series that was developed in Japan. Production on this series started circa 1992–1993, before the American TV series, but was not officially released in the United States until 2005. MegaMan NT Warrior (2002–06), based on the Mega Man Battle Network video game series (both the anime and the video game series were known as Rockman.EXE in Japan). This was followed by Mega Man Star Force (2006–08), based on the video game series of the same name (both were known as Shooting Star Rockman in Japan). The classic series was again loosely adapted in another American-produced animated series, titled Mega Man: Fully Charged (2018–2019), Mega Man was also adapted for an episode of the 2024 video game anthology series Secret Level.

=== Film adaptation ===
A feature film adaptation of the Mega Man video game series, published by Capcom, entered development in December 2014, when 20th Century Fox registered a domain for the film. In September 2015, Fox was reported to be developing the film with Chernin Entertainment. Its CEO Peter Chernin was attached as a producer, while executives David Ready and Michael Finfer were overseeing the production alongside Fox executives Mike Ireland and Ryan Horrigan. Fox had attempted to secure the film rights to Mega Man for over two years, and officially finalized the deal in early 2017. Filmmaking duo Henry Joost and Ariel Schulman were in final negotiations to write and direct the film in July 2017, when Masi Oka joined as a producer. He stated in September that the film was in early development, adding that Joost and Schulman were fans of the series and were writing the script and directing.

Capcom formally announced the live-action film in October 2018, with the tentative title Mega Man, and confirmed the involvement of Joost, Schulman, and Oka. The film was given a high budget to depict the world of the Mega Man games, and was a part of Capcom's plans to increase the value of the franchise following the release of the original series video game Mega Man 11 that month. The film was intended to appeal to both video game fans and action film audiences. Following the Walt Disney Company's acquisition of Fox's entertainment assets in March 2019, Disney CEO Bob Iger announced in August that several films in development at Fox were no longer moving forward, citing operating losses from that studio in Disney's third fiscal quarter. The Mega Man film was believed to have been shelved, but Capcom reaffirmed its development in October and stated that the film was planned to further raise awareness of the brand.

In January 2020, Disney and Chernin mutually agreed to end their producing deal inherited from Fox, citing that Disney rarely had third-party studios finance its films. Chernin Entertainment was set to retain 70 of its projects from Fox, while the remaining productions were Disney-owned properties that would still involve Chernin as an executive producer. Later that month, Mattson Tomlin was revealed to be rewriting the Mega Man script. In April, Chernin Entertainment signed a non-exclusive multi-year first-look film deal with the streaming service Netflix. Joost and Schulman said in July that major updates would soon be provided for the film, and confirmed they invited Tomlin to co-write the script after he wrote their Netflix film Project Power (2020). The duo wanted to combine their interest in robotics and the future of automation with their favorite Mega Man games, and called Mega Man an "underdog hero". In August, Tomlin said his approach was to explore Mega Man as a real person with a "primal and emotional" story that could be relatable beyond the character's traditional depictions.

In December 2021, Joost and Schulman's production company, Supermarché, was revealed to be developing the film alongside Chernin Entertainment for Netflix, with the duo's in-house producer, Orlee-Rose Strauss, also attached. Ryan Leston at IGN reported that the film was still in early development at that time. Schulman confirmed in August 2022 that he and Joost were still writing the film for Netflix, saying it would explore the future of automation and whether "man and robot becoming one" was a good or bad combination. Joost soon revealed that Josh Koenigsberg, who co-wrote the duo's film Secret Headquarters (2022), was writing a new draft of the screenplay with the duo and hoped to turn in a completed draft to Netflix in the following weeks. Koenigsberg said he had replayed past Mega Man video games to research the property.

=== Artbooks ===
Various artbooks and source books have been released for many years in Japan, often including conceptual artwork, interviews with production staff, and background information on the storyline and concepts that are not present within the games themselves. One of the most well-known is the Rockman Perfect Memories sourcebook released in 2002 which first confirmed the presence of an alternate timeline (for Battle Network), as well as exactly where the Legends series fit into the fictional Mega Man universe.

Recently a series of artbooks called the Official Complete Works has been published for individual Mega Man series, showcasing a large collection of artwork and background information. To date, books for the Zero, Classic and X (released together as R20), Star Force, and Battle Network series have been produced. Although the books have for many years been exclusive to Japan, Udon Entertainment has finished translating the Official Complete Works series for the North American market, called "R25". Mega Man: Official Complete Works was re-released as a hardcover on October 16, 2018, Mega Man X: Official Complete Works was followed by a hardcover re-release on November 27, 2018. A hardcover re-release of Mega Man Zero: Official Complete Works was released on June 11, 2019. On April 2, 2019, it was announced that Mega Man Battle Network Official Complete Works would be re-released in hardcover on August 20, 2019. On October 31, 2019, it was announced that Mega Man Star Force Official Complete Works would be getting a hardcover re-release on May 5, 2020.

=== Comics ===
Mega Man has been featured in many comics and manga in Japan, although few have been localized in North America. The most well-known series is produced by Hitoshi Ariga (who later provide character designs and artwork for future official Capcom releases, including the Super Famicom game Mega Man and Bass). The series began with Rockman Remix, later known as Rockman Megamix, and followed by Rockman Gigamix. The Megamix portion of the series would eventually be brought to North American shores thanks to Udon Entertainment, also responsible for the localization of the short Mega Man ZX manga by Shin Ogino. In the original Mega Man series, Dr. Light was known as Dr. Right, so many of his robots featured in Ariga's comic have "R"s in their designs. Udon did not alter this detail in the English version of Mega Man Megamix.

In addition, Viz Media localized the 13-volume Rockman EXE manga by Ryo Takamisaki under the name MegaMan NT Warrior. Takamisaki would later serialize a short adaptation of Mega Man Star Force 3 that was never published outside Japan. Some manga series which have not been localized outside Japan include a 12-volume Rockman X adaptation by Yoshihiro Iwamoto, over 15 Classic and X adaptations by Shigeto Ikehara, a light-hearted adaptation of Rockman Zero by Hideto Kajima, a slapstick adaptation of Shooting Star Rockman by Masaya Itagaki, another Battle Network adaptation by Jun Keijima and Miho Asada called Rockman EXE Battle Story, and a short series of slapstick Battle Network and Star Force-themed adaptations by Takumi Kawano.

Dreamwave Productions and Brazilian publisher Magnum Press made its own comic books based on the classic game series. The Brazilian series, Novas Aventuras de Megaman ("New Adventures of Megaman"), were originally published and sold in Brazil between 1996 and 1997 and drew certain criticism for featuring bizarrely altered storylines (with characters from several installments appearing at random, as well as erotic and sexual innuendo in Mega Man and X's relationship with Roll) as well for frequent nudity involving Roll and an original character named Princesa, which attempted to take over the status as the main character of the comics; its sudden end on a cliffhanger. The series was illustrated by Erica Awano, Eduardo Francisco, Daniel HDR and others.

The Dreamwave series lasted only four issues and also ended abruptly, with plot-threads from the first three issues being dropped completely in the final issue and the inclusion of a short story promising a Mega Man X follow-up that never materialized. This was one of several Dreamwave Capcom comics that were cut short or simply never made it to issue #1, including Maximo, Darkstalkers and Rival Schools.

On July 20, 2017, it was announced that Mega Man Megamix would be remastered on January 24, 2018, titled "Mega Man: Mastermix". The releases contain remastered versions of the original stories and in full color provided by Josh Perez. On September 29, 2018, It was announced that Mega Man Mastermix would be released in trade paperback form on April 2, 2019. In July 2024, Udon Entertainment announced a Mega Man comic for release in 2025.

==== Archie Comics ====
In April 2011, Archie Comics released their first issue in an ongoing series of licensed comics based on the Mega Man franchise which features the titular character going against his nemesis Dr. Wily in various, original story arcs. The overall concept was created and almost exclusively written by Ian Flynn, who was also the head writer for Archie Comics' other video game licensed comic series Sonic the Hedgehog. Consequently, as of May 2013, both series have been crossed-over in a major story arc called "Worlds Collide", which spans twelve issues between the Mega Man comics, the main Sonic the Hedgehog comics, and the latter's side-series Sonic Universe. The popularity of this crossover is such that another meeting of the two series, "Worlds Unite", was announced for spring of 2015. The series was put on "indefinite hiatus" after Issue 55.

In April 2025, Udon Entertainment announced a reprint of the series under the title Mega Man Adventures, with updated art and new short stories from the original creative team. At San Diego Comic-Con 2026, Udon announced that they will continue the comic under the Adventures banner, picking up directly after issue #55.

=== Junior novel ===
In 1990, a junior novel version of Mega Man 2 was released as part of the Worlds of Power novel series. Mega Man is turned human by Dr. Light during an accident in a machine designed to clone Mega Man. Instead of a Mega Buster, human Mega Man uses a hand gun, and instead of being able to copy the robot master's weapons, he instead takes them off of their arms. For some reason, being human does not affect him much and he is still able to consume E-drinks (Energy Tanks) and gain a power boost. The book follows the general plot of Mega Man 2 and even provides game hints at the end of some chapters.

=== Music ===
Ascertaining the identity of video game composers, especially prior to the fifth generation of consoles, can be difficult, as the composers were often uncredited or credited under a pseudonym. Recent soundtrack releases and interviews have discovered the true names of the composers; and in some cases, specific track credits. Manami Matsumae is renowned as a video game musician for her Mega Man soundtrack credits.

==== Music inspired by Mega Man ====
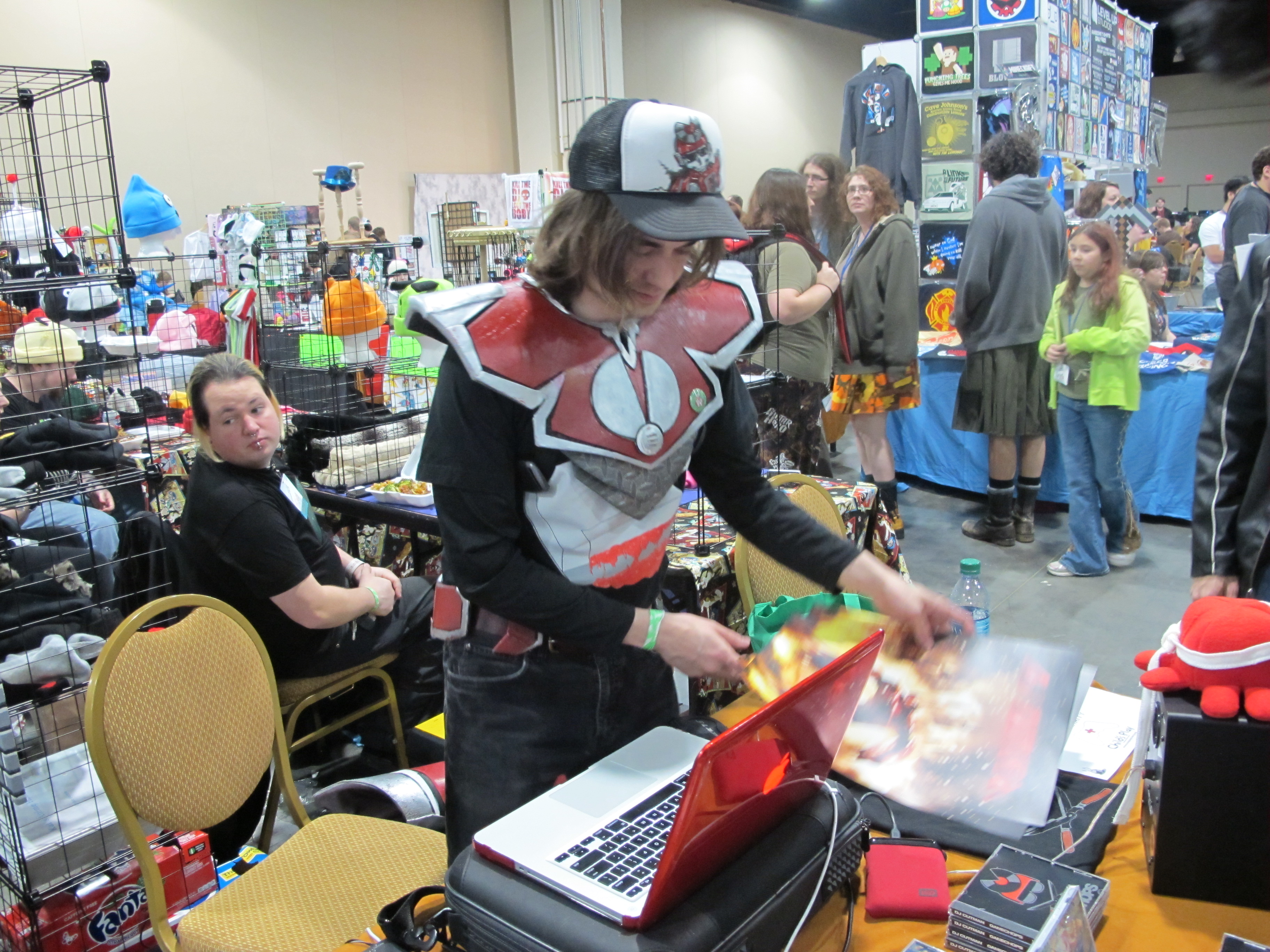
DJ Cutman vending his music at a gaming convention. Cutman is a musician inspired by hip-hop and Mega Man, from which he takes his name.

Numerous musical artists were inspired by the Mega Man franchise. Alyssa Aska of University of Calgary argued that Mega Man music "is some of the most extensively covered and remixed" video game music in the world. VGA Foundation noted a "curious number" of Mega Man inspired acts appearing in the years around 2001, including the Protomen and Horse the Band.

Rock music group the Protomen (named for Mega Man character Proto Man) formed in 2003 to compose and perform a rock opera inspired by the story and music of Mega Man, which consists of three acts: the self-titled debut album retroactively referred to as Act I, The Protomen (2005); prequel Act II: The Father of Death (2009); and the sequel to Act I, Act III: This City Made Us (2026). While the rock opera's story and sound are inspired by Mega Man, the Protomen do not tell the canonical story of Mega Man or reuse any obvious musical cues from the franchise. Act III reached number nine on the Billboard Top Album Sales chart for the month it was released and for the same time period, the Protomen charted at number four on Emerging Artists.

Independent rap artist Mega Ran remixed several Mega Man tracks for an album called Mega Ran (2007) and several follow-up albums, which were officially licensed by Capcom. As of 2018 he holds a Guinness World Record for the most songs recorded referencing a video game franchise, with 130 songs referencing Mega Man.

Indie video game cover band The Megas covers the music of the original NES Mega Man games with a twist on the story in their lyrics such as giving the Robot Master characters distinct personalities. Get Equipped (2008) is their debut album covering the events of Mega Man 2; while their albums History Repeating: Blue (2012) and History Repeating: Red (2014) cover the events of Mega Man 3.

Capcom collaborated with Sumthing Else Music Works and Mega Man inspired artists including the Protomen, Mega Ran, and the Megas for the album MM25: Mega Man Rocks (2013) in honor of the 25th anniversary of the Mega Man franchise.

== Reception and legacy ==
A 20th anniversary artwork from the series featuring various incarnations of characters named or titled as "Mega Man" for the franchise's 20th Anniversary. From left to right: Zero, Mega Man Volnutt, Mega Man.EXE, Mega Man, Grey, Ashe, Geo Stelar, Vent, and X

According to GamesRadar, the Mega Man games were the first to feature a non-linear "level select" option. This was a stark contrast to both linear games (like Super Mario Bros.) and open world games (like The Legend of Zelda and Metroid). GamesRadar credits the "level select" feature of Mega Man as the basis for the non-linear mission structure found in most open-world, multi-mission, sidequest-heavy games, including modern games like Grand Theft Auto, Red Dead Redemption and Spider-Man: Shattered Dimensions.

The original Mega Man series was well received, with IGN ranking all six original titles in the top 100 best NES games. Mega Man 2 in particular is widely regarded as the best of the series and one of the finest and most influential platformers of all time. IGN ranked it as the fourth best NES game, behind only Super Mario and Legend of Zelda titles, calling it "virtually flawless" and its gameplay "oft-replicated and never exceeded".

The Mega Man X series was positively received. The first Mega Man X game was widely acclaimed by critics since its release. Gaming magazines in the United States and Europe including Electronic Gaming Monthly (EGM), GamePro, Game Players, Nintendo Power, Super Play, and the German version of Total! consistently lauded the game's visuals, audio, control, and overall gameplay. Game Players summarized Mega Man X as "a near-perfect cart with classic gameplay, excellent graphics and sound and tons of hidden items and power-ups". Nintendo Power stated that the game had "great control and fun" along with "challenging play".

Websites such as IGN, GameSpot, GamesRadar, and 1UP.com retrospectively held Mega Man X as a successful milestone in converting the Mega Man series from its increasingly stale existence on the NES to the SNES. Brett Elston of GamesRadar said, "X was a total reinvention of the series, a perfectly executed update that had fans anticipating its release with a fervor the franchise had not seen since the Mega Man 2 and 3 days."

Mega Man X received criticism from some publications as well. Ed Semrad, Danyon Carpenter, and Al Manuel of the EGM review panel all noted that the game may have too low a difficulty level; Semrad disliked the introductory stage and felt that the game was too short as well. Super Play editor Zy Nicholson lowered his review score of the game because he found the levels were neither large nor challenging. "A few elementary tricks like repeating easy sections to recoup energy and weapon power will see you through the harder bits," Nicholson explained. "Within the level you'll also find restart points, extra lives, and no harsh time limit to put pressure on your performance. Couple this with a password system that records your level completion, status and weapon accumulation and you'll see we're not looking at a lasting challenge for the experienced player." Nintendo Power criticized how little the game had changed stating that "the theme remains the same as the Game Boy and NES Mega Man titles." The game's title initially proved a source of some confusion; the gaming media reported that many gamers mistook the "X" for the roman numeral 10.

Mega Man X was ranked number 58 in Nintendo Power's "100 Best Nintendo Games of All Time" in its 100th issue in September 1997, number 103 in the publication's "Top 200 Games" list for its 200th issue in February 2006, and the 11th best SNES game of all time in its August 2008 issue. Both GamesRadar and ScrewAttack listed Mega Man X as the eighth best game in the SNES library. GamePro similarly listed it as the eighth greatest 16-bit video game. Game Informer considered it the 120th best game of all time in its own 200th issue in December 2009. IGN named it the twelfth-best on its own top 100 SNES games list in 2011.

Mega Man X was a commercial success. The SNES version has sold 1.16 million copies worldwide as of March 31, 2021, making it the 89th best-selling Capcom game of all time. IGN's Jeremy Dunham speculated that the game's more mature storyline and its inclusion of numerous gameplay extensions over the original Mega Man series helped create a "unique cadre of fans". A spin-off series, Mega Man Zero, began in 2002 on the Game Boy Advance handheld as a result of the immense popularity of the character Zero. The Mega Man Zero games have earned generally positive reviews. Review sources both criticized and praised the high difficulty level of the game and remarked that they were similar in nature to earlier installments in the Mega Man series. Positive reviews noted the variety of abilities and customization along with an engaging story than compared to its earlier series, while negative reviews focused on the series repetitiveness and lack of originality. Review scores were lower for the last two games in the series, with critics pointing out that the games were just using the same gameplay without introducing anything new. When the first game in the series came out, reviewers were quick to hail a return to what they considered "the Mega Man roots", however some fans criticized that the lack of knowing which boss the player will face next was a change for the worse and that it "takes away what made the series unique in the past".

Overall, the character of Mega Man has been well received by critics. IGN called him an icon of Capcom. Nintendo Power listed Mega Man as their fourth favourite hero, citing his ability to steal weapons from downed Robot Masters. Mega Man was also listed as the best robot in video games by many sources such Joystick Division, UGO Networks, and Complex. GameDaily ranked him as the best Capcom character of all time. UGO Networks listed Mega Man as one of their best heroes of all time, and called him "one of the most iconic video game heroes of all time". He was included in GameSpot's "All Time Greatest Video Game Hero" contest and reached the "Elite Eight" round before losing to Mario. In a Famitsu poll done in February 2010, Mega Man was voted by readers as the twenty-second most popular video game character. The 2011 Guinness World Records Gamer's Edition lists Mega Man as the 23rd most popular video game character. In 2012, GamesRadar ranked him as the 12th "most memorable, influential, and badass" protagonist in games.

Complex ranked him as having the tenth best fighting game cameos for his guest appearances in Street Fighter X Tekken in 2012. Joystick Division cited his rivalry with Dr. Wily as seventh of the ten greatest in video games, adding giving "great credit to this rivalry for its open-endedness" and GamesRadar listed him and Proto Man as having one of the best brotherly rivalries in gaming. UGO Networks have placed Mega Man as the eighth character who most deserves his own movie.

1UP.com described Mega Man as "Capcom's ill-treated mascot", and "one of the most incongruous characters of all time", saying "it wouldn't be completely incorrect to assume that the popularity of the series has almost nothing to do with Mega Man himself", but with "his rivals, his enemies, and their abilities." IGN agreed with his dependency on support characters, saying Zero is "cooler than Mega Man". Den of Geek listed Mega Man's incarnation from Street Fighter X Tekken as the 15th best cameo in fighting game history due to how it represented Capcom's lack of interest in featuring other games as of 2012, as well as the apparent self-mockery of it due to Mega Man's poor characterization. Destructoid described this Mega Man as "legit" stating it was "an unexpected and interesting creative decision by [Capcom] using this version of Mega Man to represent them in what may be one of their biggest games of 2012".

Mega Man producer Keiji Inafune announced a spiritual successor, Mighty No. 9 in September 2013 at the crowdfunding platform Kickstarter, developed by his company Comcept and Inti Creates and published by Deep Silver, but after much controversy surrounding its marketing, delays, and mismanagement, the game was released in June 2016 to a mixed-to-negative reception. Another spiritual successor, Azure Striker Gunvolt, also developed by Inti Creates and co-produced by Inafune, was released earlier in August 2014 to a more positive reception and success, spawning two direct sequels, a spin-off series and its sequel, and a rhythm game spin-off. Batterystaple Games' 20XX, released in early access in 2016, and in full the following year, has cited Mega Man X as a major inspiration for the gameplay.

== See also ==
- Magical Kids Doropie
- Azure Striker Gunvolt
- Mighty Gunvolt
