= Mega Man Legends 3 =

Cancelled video game

- Promo image
- Developer: Capcom
- Publisher: Capcom
- Director: Masakazu Eguchi
- Producer: Tatsuya Kitabayashi
- Composer: Reo Uratani
- Series: Mega Man Legends
- Platform: Nintendo 3DS
- Release: Cancelled
- Genres: Action-adventure, third-person shooter
- Mode: Single-player

Mega Man Legends 3 (Note: known in Japan as Rockman DASH 3 (Japanese: ロックマンDASH 3, Hepburn: Rokkuman Dasshu Suri)) is a cancelled video game set to be the sequel to Mega Man Legends 2 and the fourth game in the Mega Man Legends series. It was announced for the Nintendo 3DS on September 29, 2010, during a Nintendo press conference for the 3DS.

The game was to be directed by Masakazu Eguchi, with Tatsuya Kitabayashi acting as producer. Reo Uratani composed the game's music.

Mega Man Legends 3 was cancelled on July 18, 2011.

== Plot ==
The game's story would have continued right after the events of Mega Man Legends 2. Two new characters, Aero and Barrett, would join returning ones to help rescue the protagonist, Mega Man Volnutt, from Elysium. Chris Hoffman of Nintendo Power implied the finished game may have focused on a mysterious item known as the Klicke Lafonica and the aftermath of the Elder System reactivating at the end of Legends 2.

== Development ==
In a May 2007 interview with 1UP.com, Keiji Inafune expressed that the original team members who worked on the previous Mega Man Legends games were interested in developing Mega Man Legends 3 and had considered using the MT Framework engine. A few months later, Inafune commented that he was asked by several fans if Mega Man Legends 3 would be made; although he expressed a desire to make such a game, he stated that he could not do it at that time. Detailed information about the game was announced at the New York Comic Con in October 2010. While Capcom was developing the game, several aspects from the game such as the new heroine Aero, a mech and Mega Man's design were chosen by fans as Capcom invited fans to send their designs in their official Mega Man Legends 3 website.

Although Inafune left Capcom in October 2010, the team working for Mega Man Legends 3 stated that the game would continue development. Capcom intended to release Mega Man Legends 3: Prototype Version in 2011 for the 3DS eShop, featuring 10 missions, and Barrett as a playable character. The Prototype Version was going to act as a prologue to the forthcoming main game. According to GamesRadar, Nintendo Power's Chris Hoffman was the only journalist to play the Prototype Version before the game was cancelled. Three years after the game's cancellation, employees from Cup of Tea Productions—the studio responsible for Mega Man Legends 3 voice recording—confirmed that the Prototype Version was very close to completion.

== Cancellation ==
On July 18, 2011, Capcom officially announced that production on Mega Man Legends 3 was cancelled. Capcom also announced that neither a full game nor Mega Man Legends 3: Prototype Version would be released. In replies to fans two days later, Capcom's UK Twitter account appeared to blame lack of fan involvement for the game's cancellation. Capcom UK later apologized for the original wording and clarified that the tweets referred to the lack of interaction in the Development Rooms that Capcom created to help the game's development, not to the fans "who have been nothing but supportive". Capcom shut down the Japanese Development Room one month after the initial announcement, but initially stated the North American Development Room would remain open indefinitely; it was later closed in 2020. Many of their contents have been archived by the fans.

CyberConnect2 CEO Hiroshi Matsuyama—who was working with Capcom on Asura's Wrath at the time—stated he would like to develop Mega Man Legends 3 as he was disappointed in the game's cancellation. Inafune also expressed disappointment with this decision and offered Capcom to complete it with his own team, despite having left the company. Capcom refused Inafune's offer. In 2014, Inafune again stated he would like to finish Mega Man Legends 3 if given the chance.

In the aftermath of the cancellation, the game's programming director, Yoshiyuki Fujikawa, encouraged fans to continue showing their interest in Mega Man Legends 3. Fans created a Facebook group titled "100,000 Strong for Bringing Back Mega Man Legends 3", aiming to get Capcom to resume development of the game. The group was covered considerably on popular gaming sites, including Destructoid, Joystiq, and GoNintendo. The group reached its goal of 100,000 members on April 25, 2012. By January 2013, two fans developed a browser-based fangame which recreated content from the Servbot mission in the cancelled game's prototype version.

In August 2016, over five years after the game's cancellation, the Facebook group released a documentary about the history of the game's development. In a 2018 interview with Game Informer, Mega Man 11 director Koji Oda said that he's "well aware that there is a voice out there that wants something new for games like Mega Man Legends and Battle Network". On June 9, 2020, composer Makoto Tomozawa made a tweet to gauge fan interest in crowdfunding activities for the game.
