= Mega Man Legends (video game) =

1997 video game

- North American PlayStation box art
- Developer: Capcom Production Studio 2
- Publishers: JP/NA: Capcom; PAL: Virgin Interactive Entertainment
- Director: Yoshinori Kawano
- Producers: Keiji Inafune; Yoshinori Kawano
- Designer: Kazunori Kadoi
- Programmer: Masaru Ijuin
- Artist: Kazushi Ito
- Writers: Yoshinori Kawano; Shin Kurosawa
- Composer: Makoto Tomozawa
- Series: Mega Man Legends
- Platforms: PlayStation; Nintendo 64; Windows; PlayStation Portable
- Release: December 18, 1997: PlayStation; JP: December 18, 1997; NA: September 10, 1998; EU: December 4, 1998 Nintendo 64; JP: November 22, 2000; NA: January 10, 2001 Windows; JP: February 23, 2001; NA: July 14, 2001 PlayStation Portable; JP: August 4, 2005
- Mode: Single-player

Mega Man Legends (Note: Known in Japan as Rockman Dash - Episode 1: Adventurous Spirit of Steel (Japanese: ロックマンDASH エピソード1 鋼の冒険心, Hepburn: Rokkuman Dasshu - Episōdo Wan: Hagane no Bōkenshin)) is a 1997 video game released by Capcom. It is the first game in the Mega Man Legends sub-series of Mega Man games from Capcom, and the second major 3D polygonal Mega Man title in the franchise, following Mega Man: Battle & Chase. It was released for the PlayStation in 1997 in Japan, and in 1998 in North America. A Nintendo 64 port was released in 2000 with the same title, but it was renamed Mega Man 64 for the North American release in 2001. It was also ported to Windows in 2001, and to the PlayStation Portable in 2005, the latter only in Japan. Its most recent release was as a PS one Classic on the North American PlayStation Network in 2015.

Legends stars a new incarnation of Mega Man, known as Mega Man Volnutt, the game's player character. Mega Man Volnutt is a "Digger", someone tasked with investigating ruins on a flooded Earth. During his journey with his friends, their ship crashes on Kattelox Island, where Mega Man confronts pirates seeking the island's hidden treasure. As an action-adventure game, Mega Man Legends's gameplay is significantly different from the original series, though it retains some familiar elements.

Mega Man Legends received positive critical reception for its transition from 2D graphics to 3D. However, the Nintendo 64 and Windows ports were criticized for lacking improvements over the PlayStation version, and their graphics were considered outdated by the time of their release. Mega Man Legends was followed by the prequel The Misadventures of Tron Bonne and the sequel Mega Man Legends 2.

== Gameplay ==
Mega Man Legends differs significantly from the platforming gameplay of previous Mega Man games, with the primary change being its three-dimensional worlds and movement. Unlike the original Mega Man series, which are platform games, Legends is an action-adventure game. It features mechanics similar to those in Tomb Raider, such as the ability to grab and climb ledges, perform left/right diving maneuvers, control the camera manually, and use lock-on targeting.

The player controls Mega Man Volnutt throughout the game, completing various missions such as investigating ruins or fighting pirates. The game features a large world with multiple dungeons that must be explored in a specific order, as well as a town with non-player characters to interact with. The story is revealed through cutscenes.

An early boss battle in which Mega Man battles robots controlled by pirates

Although the player moves through the game solely on foot, once Roll Caskett repairs a support car, she can transport Mega Man to specific locations.

In Legends, large gems called Refractors serve as the primary power source. Smaller fragments, known as Refractor Shards, can be exchanged for money. When enemies are defeated, they often drop these shards, which are automatically converted into Zenny, the game's currency. Mega Man's health can be increased by purchasing upgrades in shops, recovered by buying health packs, collecting orange cubes from defeated enemies, or by asking the character Data to heal him. Mega Man also possesses a Life Shield, which reduces the amount of damage he takes from enemies. Enemy damage can be further mitigated by acquiring armor or helmet upgrades.

Mega Man's interactions with characters can also influence the price of items. If the player makes Mega Man behave rudely toward characters, item prices will increase, and the dialogue with those characters will change.

The power of Mega Man's main weapon, the Buster Gun, is determined by the Buster Parts equipped. These parts can enhance four stats of the Buster Gun: Attack (strength of the shots), Rapid (firing speed), Range (distance the shots travel), and Energy (number of shots fired before needing to pause). Buster Parts can be obtained from stores or found in dungeons. Additionally, Roll can create Buster Parts from unusable objects discovered in the ruins. She can also craft weapons for the player using specific combinations of parts found in dungeons or purchased in shops, many of which serve as complements to the Buster Gun.

The only way to refill special weapons in the field is by using an item that can be purchased, though only one can be carried at a time. Unlike the original series, only one special weapon can be equipped at any given time, and switching between them requires talking to Roll. Special weapons can be upgraded in five different stats: Attack, Rapid, Range, Energy, and Special. To upgrade these weapons, the player must spend a certain amount of Zenny. Additional difficulty settings can be unlocked after finishing the game.

== Plot ==
=== Setting and characters ===
The Legends series is set on a flooded Earth, where only a few scattered islands remain and energy sources are scarce. To meet the growing demand for energy to power machinery, people rely on quantum refractors found in ancient ruins. Shards of these refractors are used as currency. However, the ultimate goal for most people is to find the Mother Lode, a legendary item of infinite power that could solve the energy crisis once and for all. Those who explore these ruins in search of refractors are known as "Diggers" ("Digouters" in the Japanese version). They are assisted by Spotters, who use technology to map the Diggers' paths and help them avoid or defeat Reaverbots, hostile robots that guard the ruins.

The game's protagonist is Mega Man Volnutt, a Digger who lives aboard an airship called the Flutter. He resides there with Roll Caskett, his Spotter who is searching for her missing parents; Barrel Caskett, Roll's grandfather; and Data, a mysterious monkey who communicates in gibberish that only Mega Man can understand.

The main antagonists are the Bonne family, pirates intent on stealing the secret treasure of Kattelox Island to amass wealth. The group is led by Teisel Bonne, while his sister, Tron Bonne, builds most of their robots and eventually develops feelings for Mega Man. Their youngest brother, Bon Bonne, is either fully robotic or encased in a robot suit, and only says one word: "Babu!" The Bonne siblings are accompanied by forty Servbots, small robots who serve under Tron's command. The Bonne family travels and lives aboard their flying warship, the Gesellschaft.

=== Story ===
The game begins with Mega Man Volnutt exploring a tower ruin in the middle of the ocean, where he retrieves a large blue refractor. After defeating the Reaverbots guarding his path, he returns to the airship, the Flutter, and departs from the ruin. However, the Flutter suffers from engine issues and crash-lands on Kattelox Island. Stranded, Mega Man, Roll, and Barrel begin searching for parts to repair the airship.

While on the island, pirates led by the Bonne family attack Kattelox City, using giant mechanical weapons in their hunt for the island's legendary treasure. Mega Man decides to intervene and protect the city. He defeats the pirates' forces, including Tron Bonne and her robots in the Downtown area, and Bon Bonne, who leads the siege on City Hall. Afterward, their leader Teisel Bonne plans an assault on the Clozer Woods ruins, but Mega Man also defeats him, safeguarding the island.

The island's mayor, Amelia, reveals to Mega Man that the Bonne family is searching for Kattelox's secret treasure. Legends claim that uncovering it would bring about a great disaster for the island. Concerned about strange activity in the island's ruins, Amelia asks Mega Man to explore them and investigate the increased presence of Reaverbots.

Mega Man continues his journey through the Forest Ruins, where he discovers a large yellow refractor. Using this to power a boat, he gains access to the Lake Ruins. After defeating the Bonnes again, who had turned stolen boats into robotic weapons, he retrieves a huge red refractor from the ruins. This allows Roll to repair the Flutter, granting them the ability to fly again and reach the Clozer Woods ruins. Inside these ruins, Mega Man unlocks the Main Gate, the largest ruin on the island, in hopes of uncovering the source of the Reaverbot activity. On the way back, the Bonnes launch a final attack with their mothership, the Gesellschaft, but Mega Man destroys it and defeats them once more.

After exploring the depths of the Main Gate, Mega Man unlocks access to three Sub-Cities scattered across Kattelox Island. While investigating them, Mega Man encounters the Bonne family once again in the Old City and destroys their newest robot, a colossal monster named Bruno. Accepting their defeat, the Bonnes retreat, though Teisel plots to steal the treasure of the Main Gate once Mega Man retrieves it.

Using three keys from the Sub-Cities, Mega Man delves deeper into the Main Gate, where he uncovers an ancient stasis chamber housing Mega Man Juno, a 3rd-class bureaucratic unit from Eden, a space station orbiting above the planet. Upon awakening, Juno recognizes Mega Man as "Mega Man Trigger" and realizes that Mega Man is suffering from memory loss.

Juno reveals a chilling plan: the island's population, referred to as "carbons", must be purged to maintain control, as their unchecked growth would eventually become a threat. Mega Man protests, realizing that Juno is referring to the people of Kattelox Island, but Juno insists that the "reinitialization" process is necessary. Juno leaves Mega Man trapped while he prepares the reinitialization program, intending to exterminate the island's population.

With help from Tron and Teisel Bonne, Mega Man escapes the trap and confronts Juno. Despite Juno transforming into a more powerful form, Mega Man defeats him in battle. However, even after Juno's defeat, his backup data is sent to Eden, confirming that the Carbon Purification Process is set to begin.

Just when all seems lost, Mega Man's companion Data overrides the system's commands. Data cancels the Purification Process and deletes Juno's backup data, effectively preventing the reinitialization from happening.

Data then explains to Mega Man that he holds all of his original memories from when he was known as Mega Man Trigger. Data reveals that Mega Man had transferred his memories into him to prevent Eden from ever accessing or tampering with them. Data promises to restore Mega Man's memory when the time is right.

With the island saved, the residents of Kattelox celebrate Mega Man as a hero. The Caskett family, now aboard the fully repaired Flutter, sets off to continue their adventures elsewhere. Meanwhile, the Bonne family, undeterred by their defeat, sails away on a makeshift boat constructed by Tron out of scrap parts, hauling the giant refractor they stole from the Main Gate.

== Development and release ==
Producer Keiji Inafune stated that his goal was to create a new Mega Man game that would be entirely different from previous entries in the series. Aiming to appeal to gamers of all ages, Inafune decided to blend action, RPG, and adventure genres, though he questioned whether Mega Man Legends would still be engaging. All the humanoid characters in the game were animated using motion capture. One of the earliest global showings of Legends occurred at the Electronic Entertainment Expo in Atlanta, Georgia, in June 1997, where it was titled Mega Man Neo. A demo of the game, titled "Rockman Neo" (ロックマンNEO), was later included in the Japanese director's cut version of Resident Evil. The game was released in Japan on December 18, 1997, with a re-release under the "PlayStation the Best" label following on May 4, 1999.

In December 1997, Capcom USA's president, Bill Gardner, informed IGN that Mega Man Legends would be ported to the Nintendo 64. Although the Japanese name had already been finalized, "Mega Man Neo" remained as the English title, with Gardner stating that the official name had not yet been decided. In January 1998, the game was renamed "Mega Man Nova" due to a general consensus that the previous name was not appealing. However, just two weeks later, the name was reverted due to trademark issues. The final title, Mega Man Legends, was confirmed in March 1998. By April 1998, the English adaptation of the game had been completed, but Capcom chose to delay its release until September of the same year, believing it would perform better during the holiday season. The English localization removed a feature from the original game where Mega Man could either kick or calm a dog that was chasing Tron; in the English version, he can only calm the dog. Other changes in the English release included character name alterations, such as the protagonist Mega Man Volnutt, who was known as Rock Volnutt in the Japanese version.

The PC port of the game was first announced by Capcom at the Tokyo Game Show in April 2000, alongside Dino Crisis and Resident Evil 3: Nemesis. The PlayStation Portable version of Mega Man Legends was released in Japan on August 4, 2005. It was re-released on December 21, 2006, and again on January 29, 2009, with the latter also including the PSP port of Mega Man Legends 2. Although a North American release of the port was planned, it was ultimately cancelled. The PlayStation original was added to the PS one Classics program on September 29, 2015. However, likely due to licensing issues, this release is only available through the North American PlayStation Network, limited to PlayStation 3 and PlayStation Vita.

The soundtrack for the game was composed by Makoto Tomozawa. According to Tomozawa, creating the sound design for the game was a challenge, especially for Toshio Kajino, one of the sound designers, who had no prior experience working on a Mega Man title. The theme song for the Japanese version is "Another Sun", while the ending theme is "Anata no Kaze ga Fuku kara" (あなたの風が吹くから; lit. "For Your Winds Shall Blow"), both performed by Reika Morishita. On February 21, 1998, Capcom released a CD titled Rockman Dash Original Soundtrack (「ロックマンDASH」 オリジナル・サウンドトラック). The CD features a total of 40 tracks, including the opening and ending themes. Tomozawa mentioned that the CD still omits other tracks from the game due to the large number of tracks in the overall soundtrack.

== Reception ==
Reception

Aggregate scores
Aggregator	Score
GameRankings	PS: 73.73% PC: 33.67% N64: 63.94%
Metacritic	N64: 59/100

Review scores
Publication	Score
Electronic Gaming Monthly	N64: 5.5/10
Famitsu	PS: 9/10, 8/10, 8/10, 6/10; N64: 7/10, 7/10, 7/10, 7/10
Game Informer	PS: 8.5/10
GamePro	PS: 4.5/5
GameSpot	PS: 7.2/10.0; N64: 5.3; PC: 3.6
IGN	PS: 8.4/10.0; N64: 4.5
Next Generation	3/5
PC Gamer (US)	PC: 25%

Since its release, Mega Man Legends has received a moderately positive critical response from video game publications, although the ports for Nintendo 64 and PC garnered mixed to negative reviews. GameRankings reported an average score of 73.73% for the PlayStation version. The PC and Nintendo 64 versions had lower averages of 33.67% and 63.94%, respectively. On Metacritic, the Nintendo 64 port holds an aggregate score of 59 out of 100 based on six reviews. James Mielke of GameSpot complimented it avoided the pitfalls of earlier platformer games bymaking the game an action and role-playing video game hybrid instead with the item shops and merchants of the later genre being represented. Despite this shift, critics appreciated how Legends retained various elements from the original Mega Man series. Game Informer praised the variations of Mega Man's special weapons, stating, "There is plenty of shoot-'em-up action for fans of traditional Mega Man titles." The storyline of the game was also commended, being described as "solid" by Game Informer and "engrossing" by GamePro, with the latter highlighting the boss characters as some of the best in the entire series. Conversely, the game's difficulty received mixed reviews, particularly regarding the boss battles, although the addition of a tutorial mode in the Nintendo 64 port was praised.

Next Generation reviewed the PlayStation version of the game, rating it three stars out of five, and stated, "First impressions can be a killer, and the game just doesn't possess the most outstanding graphics or mechanics to hook the merely curious after just one play. For those who look deeper, it's a diamond in the rough."

The N64 port, however, faced criticism from Famitsu for being too similar to the original game. IGN commented that the PlayStation game "was a poor experience", questioning "why Capcom [...] decided to make Nintendo 64 owners suffer through it unchanged." GameSpot found the graphics outdated and noted that, in addition to lacking updates from the original game, some music and sound clips were lost during the conversion. The PC version received an even more negative review; GameSpot rated it a "bad" 3.6 out of 10, stating that gamers would find the PlayStation port more worthwhile. Similar to Famitsu's review of the Nintendo 64 port, GameSpot criticized the lack of additions to the PC port. The PC conversion of the cutscenes was found to contain an error where a character starts a dialogue while another is still speaking.

In a 2007 retrospective of the Mega Man series, Jeremy Parish of 1UP.com ranked Mega Man Legends as "Worth it!", praising its setting, plot, English voice acting, and boss battles. GamesRadar shared similar sentiments, stating that the game was "a complete overhaul in every way" and noting that its jump to 3D graphics "seems totally lost in this day and age..." Conversely, ScrewAttack placed Mega Man Legends fourth in their article "Top Ten Worst 2D to 3D Games", criticizing the game's controls, camera, and the main character's voice. Allgame noted that while the game "had some significant problems that kept it from being anything more than a diversion", the most notable issue was its controls, which were improved in the sequel. Mega Man's design ranked third in GamePro's "The 8 Worst Game Character Makeovers Ever", with author Patrick Shaw commenting that having Mega Man without a helmet "just doesn't work". GamesRadar's article "Gaming's Most Absurdly Oversized Limbs" featured the game as an example of titles with characters having oversized arms. In 2008, Joystiq's Wesley Fenlon listed Mega Man Legends as a potential game to be ported to the Wii, focusing on the game's and the console's controls. In December 1998, a Capcom representative stated that Mega Man Legends had become a very popular game.

Inafune stated that the game did not sell well, attributing this to its release occurring years before sandbox games became popular.
