= Mega Man Legends =

- Cover art for the Japanese Nintendo 64, PC and The Best for Family releases of the first game, featuring the primary protagonists
- Genres: Action-adventure; Third-person shooter
- Developer: Capcom
- Publisher: Capcom
- Platforms: PlayStation; Nintendo 64; PC; PlayStation Portable; Mobile phones
- First release: Mega Man Legends; December 18, 1997
- Latest release: Rockman DASH: 5tsu no Shima no Daibouken! February 1, 2008
- Parent series: Mega Man

Mega Man Legends (Note: Known in Japan as Rockman DASH (ロックマンDASH, Rokkuman Dasshu). The DASH acronym in the Japanese title stands for Digouter's Adventure Story in Halcyon Days.) is a sub-series in the Mega Man franchise. While the main series is known for its 2D side-scrolling platformer gameplay with story that is told through cutscenes, this series instead features 3D action-adventure gameplay and a more detailed story.

== Plot overview ==
The games are set in the distant future; a time when the planet Earth is mostly ocean, leaving some islands left for civilization to prosper on. Based on the in-game dialogue, the series takes place at least in the 6th millennium. By this time frame, the original humans have been replaced by artificial lifeforms almost identical to them which can produce offspring with almost no effort.

The player controls Mega Man Volnutt, a teenage digger and archaeologist of sorts who searches underground ruins mainly for Quantum Refractors, which are the civilization's primary source of energy. He was found as a baby on Nino Island at the bottom of the closed-off Nino Ruins and was raised by Professor Barrel Caskett along with his granddaughter Roll Caskett.

Giving them trouble is the Bonnes, a group of pirates consisting of leader Teisel Bonne, his sister (though the booklet says daughter) Tron Bonne (who is also allegedly infatuated with Mega Man), their baby brother Bon Bonne who somehow can drive a large mech suit (known primarily for his repeated line, "Babu!", which has become a catchphrase among the series' fans), and the 41 Servbots (only one of which is in The Misadventures of Tron Bonne). More trouble is given to Mega Man by the Reaverbots, the techno-organic semi-intelligent residents of the underground ruins who serve to protect its contents.

== Games ==
=== Main ===
- Mega Man Legends (titled Rockman DASH: Hagane no Bōkenshin in Japan), was released for PlayStation in December 1997. It was the first fully 3-D action-adventure Mega Man game and introduced new mechanics to the franchise such as RPG elements and a sandbox style environment for Mega Man to explore. The game was later ported to Nintendo 64 in 2000, to Microsoft Windows in 2001, and to PlayStation Portable in 2005.
- Mega Man Legends 2 (titled Rockman DASH 2 - Episode 2: Ōinaru Isan in Japan) was released in April 2000 for the PlayStation and is the final mainline game produced by Capcom in the series. Legends 2 is similar to the original but features a more streamlined realtime 3-D action gameplay system and allows the player to explore multiple smaller islands and locations in the sky in contrast to the original's single island. The game ends in an infamous unresolved cliffhanger that results in Mega Man Volnutt being stranded on a remote satellite called "Elysium". Ports for Microsoft Windows and PlayStation Portable followed in 2003 and 2005 respectively, as well as a re-release in 2015 for the PlayStation Network service on PlayStation 3, alongside Misadventures of Tron Bonne and the original Mega Man Legends

=== Other ===
- The Misadventures of Tron Bonne (titled Tron ni Kobun in Japan) is a prequel title taking place before the events of the original Legends, focusing on the origin story of series antihero Tron Bonne. It features various styles of gameplay, including action, puzzle and treasure hunting. It was released for the PlayStation in July 1999 in Japan and in April and June of 2000 for North America and Europe respectively.
- Rockman DASH 2 - Episode 1: "Roll's Close Call!" Edition (ロックマンDASH2 エピソード1 「ロールちゃん危機一髪！」の巻, Rockman DASH 2 - Episode 1: 'Roll-chan Kikiippatsu!' no Maki) is the prologue episode to Legends 2, bundled with Japanese copies of The Misadventures of Tron Bonne released in July 1999. It features four missions titled "Roll's Secret Training", "Capture Pigs", "Underground Dungeon" and "Jagd Krabbe's Assault", all of which take place before the events of Legends 2.
- Rockman DASH Great Five-Island Adventure (ロックマンDASH 5つの島の大冒険！, Rockman DASH: Itsutsu no Shima no Daibōken!), was unveiled for mobile phones on September 23, 2007, at the Tokyo Game Show, and subsequently released it in early 2008. The title is set between the first and second game.

=== Cancelled ===
- Mega Man Legends 3 was announced in September 2010 by Capcom. It was being developed for the then upcoming Nintendo 3DS, and an early access/demo prologue version called Mega Man Legends 3: Prototype Version (Note: Known in Japan as Rockman DASH 3 The Prologue! Gēmu no Uragawa Mise Chaimasu Hen (ロックマンDASH3 THE プロローグ! ゲームのウラ側見せちゃいます編, Rockman DASH 3 The Prologue! Gēmu no Uragawa Mise Chaimasu Hen)) was planned, but the game and its prologue were both ultimately cancelled in July 2011, to great backlash from fans.

== Development ==
At one point Capcom had planned to release 1997's Mega Man Legends in the US under the domesticated title Mega Man Neo, and then Mega Man Nova.

Keiji Inafune, producer on all three Legends games, has consistently expressed interest in making a third installment. Inafune stated, "[My favorite game is] Mega Man Legends, a title that really didn't sell well in the Mega Man franchise" at the 2007 Tokyo Game Show. He claims that creating a Rockman game for the next generation consoles would cost around $15 million to fund and develop. Mega Man Legends 3 was announced for the Nintendo 3DS on September 29, 2010, during a Nintendo press conference for the 3DS, nearly ten years after the American release of Mega Man Legends 2. In September 2007, Keiji Inafune commented that he was asked by several fans if Mega Man Legends 3 would be made; although Inafune expressed a desire to make such a game, he stated that he could not do it at that time. Detailed information about the game was announced at the New York Comic Con in October 2010. Although Inafune left Capcom in November 2010, the team working for Mega Man Legends 3 stated that the game would continue development. Capcom intended to release Mega Man Legends 3: Prototype Version in 2011 for the 3DS eShop, featuring 10 missions, and a new playable character, Barrett. The Prototype Version was going to act as a prologue to the forthcoming main game. On July 18, 2011, it was announced that production on Mega Man Legends 3 was being cancelled, and that neither a full game, nor Mega Man Legends 3: Prototype Version would be released, and that there were currently no plans to resume production.

A fan campaign meant to persuade Capcom to continue development on Mega Man Legends 3 started shortly after its cancellation. 100,000 Strong for Bringing Back Mega Man Legends 3, also known as Get Me Off the Moon, includes sending as many physical letters and e-mails as well as giving as many phone calls to Capcom's headquarters as possible, in addition to posting messages on the branch's Facebook and Twitter accounts, requesting for a release of the game. The group also advocates using Tanomi.com, a Japanese site that allows people to request a product. 100,000 Strong for Bringing Back Mega Man Legends 3 has been covered by Digital Trends, Destructoid, GamePro, and Eurogamer. In addition, Mega Man Legends 3 Project's programming director Yoshiyuki Fujikawa has responded favorably to the campaign and "encourages fans to fight for the game to be released." Capcom themselves has taken notice of the project and the Facebook page and have confirmed that "they were aware of the Facebook group but they would not be changing their plans", stating, "While Capcom has a built a strong relationship with its community and values their feedback, Mega Man Legends 3 development has officially ceased without plans to resume development."

== Potential future ==
In March 2026, producer Shingo Izumi stated that, although there are no current plans for a Mega Man Legends collection, it could be a possibility in the future.
