= The Misadventures of Tron Bonne =

1999 video game

- North American box art
- Developer: Capcom Production Studio 2
- Publishers: JP/NA: Capcom; PAL: Eidos Interactive
- Producer: Keiji Inafune
- Designer: Masahiro Yasuma
- Programmer: Koetsu Matsuda
- Artists: Shinsuke Komaki; Tetsuhei Asano; Shigeru Takahashi
- Writers: Yoshinori Kawano; Haruo Murata; Shin Kurosawa
- Composer: Toshihiko Horiyama
- Series: Mega Man Legends
- Platform: PlayStation
- Release: JP: July 22, 1999; NA: May 22, 2000; EU: June 16, 2000
- Genres: Action-adventure, third-person shooter
- Mode: Single-player

The Misadventures of Tron Bonne (Note: known in Japan as Tron ni Kobun (トロンにコブン, Toron ni Kobun; "Tron and Henchmen")) is a 1999 action-adventure game developed and published by Capcom for the PlayStation. Released in Japan in 1999 and in North America and Europe in 2000, the game is part of the Mega Man Legends (Rockman DASH) series, and is also a prequel and spin-off of the first Legends game. Rather than focusing on the heroic protagonists of the series, the game follows series antihero Tron Bonne, sister of the criminal Bonne family of air pirates. The Japanese version included PocketStation support, whereas the North American and European version did not.

== Gameplay ==
Unlike other games in the Mega Man series, MTB bears three distinct play styles, each related to a specific mission. Players are tasked with completing (with gradual difficulty) "moving-box" puzzle stages (containers of various contents in Teche and Primiki Harbor), a Descent-like adventure stage, and several action stages similar to the remainder of the Mega Man Legends series (robbing a bank near Gold City and exploring the Nakkai Ruins themselves). Another gameplay aspect is a collection mission built into one of the action missions, located in Sart Farm, where the player must gather pigs, cows and horses. Players can choose freely among the three stage types at any time, but each level may only be cleared once. The only exception is the Nakkai Ruins, which can be explored anytime, however the player may only collect Diana's Tear (by defeating the boss) once (afterwards the boss room will be empty).

Instrumental in the game's story is the interaction between Tron and her army of forty loyal Servbots. Each Servbot is given a personality and a few other traits, and the player's investigation and interaction is rewarded with money for the loan, additional parts and weapons for the Gustaff, or other assistance. Servbots also play a role during the adventure and action stages (limited to seven, three or one, depending on the type, generally one leading the others, and called "sniper"), assisting Tron in her quest by ransacking houses or defeating minor threats as the situation and their individual skills warrant. However, if a Servbot has a high sloth level, he may become lazy and disobey Tron. A Servbot's skills may be increased by putting him through training exercises (attack and speed), going on missions (brains) or by disciplining him in the Torture Room (thus lowering the sloth level); in both cases, the effect of the action is determined by a minigame. Some Servbots learn their special skill once their skills reach a high enough level, whilst others learn it as soon as they're given a certain special item.

== Plot ==
The game begins some time before the events of Mega Man Legends. The Bonne family's leader, Teisel, seeks the ancient Nakkai Ruins to try and uncover Diana's Tear, a gigantic and highly valuable Refractor. After rendezvousing with younger brother Bon, the two are subdued and captured by Glyde, a rival air pirate in the service of loan shark Lex Loath. Tron finds out that the money used to build the Bonnes' flying fortress was funded by Loath, and can only watch as her brothers are taken away. After discovering that Teisel defaulted on his 1,000,000-zenny loan, she realizes that she must pay back the money or Teisel and Bon will not be seen again. Seeing no other options, Tron suits up in a custom Gustaff mecha and, along with her army of 40 identical Servbots, begins her quest to pay the ransom through any means possible.

During repeated bank robberies, Tron encounters officer Denise Marmalade, who repeatedly fails to stop her, even when engaging Tron in her own police-issue mecha. In the caves, the Servbots find the three Aurora Stones, help the restless spirit of a man that died trying to find the Fountain of Youth, and help two Diggers fall in love. In the ruins, Tron explores for valuable artifacts, including the Diana's Tear.

After various adventures, Tron brings the one million zenny to Loath, who then claims that Teisel also owes an additional two million zenny of interest on his loan. While she manages to acquire the requested money, Loath insists that she owes interest on the interest. Realizing that Loath will never let her brothers go, she too is captured and imprisoned.

Tron's favorite Servbot takes command in her absence, leading the others on a rescue mission. Though the Servbots succeed in freeing the Bonnes and Tron defeats Glyde, Loath activates his secret weapon, the Colossus. The Bonnes at first try to attack it with the Gesselschaft's weapons, but this has almost no effect, and the Colossus' return fire causes Tron to be very seriously injured and Teisel to get thrown overboard. The Servbot crew band together and defeat to take on the Colossus in the Gustaff. They succeed, finally defeating Loath and Glyde once and for all. To ensure they never cause trouble again, Tron hands Loath and Glyde into the police, saving officer Denise's job in the process.

The issue finally resolved, the Bonnes, reunited, set off for Kattelox Island. While in flight, the favorite Servbot accidentally throws out a giant Refractor won from Loath with the trash, causing Tron and Teisel to panic and force a pit stop to search for it.

== Development ==
The Misadventures of Tron Bonne was first revealed in December 1998. A Capcom representative said that although a release was not confirmed yet, the staff would to announce it in a short time due to the popularity of the first Mega Man Legends game.

In June 1999, Capcom announced that Tron Ni Kobun would come packed with a trial demo version of the then-upcoming Rockman DASH 2 (Mega Man Legends 2). The demo was meant to provide better graphics and a larger scale universe. According to the official Japanese Rockman DASH website by Capcom, the Japanese demo isn't by any means a prototype, but an adventure "completely independent" from the final retail product of the game. The demo is known as Rockman DASH 2: Episode 1 ~ Roll-chan Kiki Ippatsu!. The demo included in the North American version would much more closely resemble the final content of the game, consisting of three selectable events, two being boss fights (against Tron's crabbot and a giant ape-ish Reaverbot, which can be considered as "easy" and "hard", respectively) and the last one the full exploration of the Forbidden Ruins).

The game has the same voice acting from the rest of the other Legends games for its main characters. In the North American version, Tron Bonne is voiced by Caroly Larson, while Teisel is voiced by Rob Smith (Tesshō Genda in Japan). This is the only game in the Legends series where Ikue Ōtani does not provide Bon Bonne's voice for the North American version. The Japanese version of the game features two vocal songs, "Love Letter" and "Magic!", both sung by Mayumi Iizuka, Tron Bonne's Japanese voice actress.

== Reception ==
Reception

Aggregate score
Aggregator	Score
GameRankings	77%

Review scores
Publication	Score
AllGame	3.5/5
CNET Gamecenter	8/10
Electronic Gaming Monthly	6.75/10 (Note: Four critics of Electronic Gaming Monthly gave the game each a score of 8/10, 5/10, 6.5/10, and 7.5/10 in an early review.)
EP Daily	8/10
Eurogamer	8/10
Famitsu	27/40
Game Informer	7/10
GameFan	80%
GamePro	15.5/20 (Note: GamePro gave the game three 4/5 scores for graphics, control, and fun factor, and 3.5/5 for sound in an early review.)
GameRevolution	B
GameSpot	7.7/10
IGN	7.5/10
Next Generation	4/5
Official U.S. PlayStation Magazine	4/5

The game received "favorable" reviews according to the review aggregation website GameRankings. Jeff Lundrigan of NextGen said in an early review, "This is not a game that's neatly pigeonholed as anything, whether by game genre, or by approach, which as far as we're concerned is reason enough to like it. The bonus is that it also happens to be terrific." In Japan, Famitsu gave it a score of 27 out of 40. GamePro said in an early review, "For fans of Mega Man Legends and those looking for a lighthearted action title with some variety, Tron is a strong rental – just don't expect to be thrilled for days on end. It's a fun, but short, ride."

According to Media Create sales information, The Misadventures of Tron Bonne was the 212th best-selling video game in Japan in 1999 at 61,127 units sold. Eidos reported light sales of the game, among other releases, for its first quarter financial results ending June 30, 2000.

The game was nominated for the "Best Miscellaneous Game" award at the Official U.S. PlayStation Magazine 2000 Editors' Awards, which went to RPG Maker.

In a 2007 retrospective of the Mega Man series, Jeremy Parish of 1Up.com ranked The Misadventures of Tron Bonne as "Worth it!", with comments focused on the gameplay and the playable characters. GameSpot called it a "bridge" between Mega Man Legends and its sequel and that some fans would not find it appealing.
