= Servbot =

- Mega Man character
- Promotional artwork of Servbot from Marvel vs Capcom 2
- First appearance: Mega Man Legends (1997)
- Created by: Keiji Inafune
- Designed by: Kazushi Ito
- Voiced by: EN: Elizabeth Hanna; JA: Chisa Yokoyama

In-universe information
- Species: Robot

The Servbots (Note: Known in Japan as the Kobun (コブン, lit. Henchmen)) are a group of fictional robots from Capcom's Mega Man Legends series. Created by Tron Bonne, they are depicted as childlike, loyal and frequently incompetent henchmen who perform domestic, mechanical and combat duties for the Bonne family. They first appear in the 1997 video game Mega Man Legends.

The characters were given a central gameplay role in The Misadventures of Tron Bonne, released in Japan as Tron ni Kobun, and subsequently headlined several Japan-exclusive mobile games using the Kobun name. Critics have identified the Servbots as among the most memorable elements of the Legends series, particularly for their comic personalities and their tendency to overshadow Tron. Their design has also been used throughout Capcom's crossover games and as recurring iconography in the Dead Rising series.

== Characteristics ==
Servbots are a group of diminutive robots with yellow heads, with their overall design resembling Lego minifigures. Created by the pirate Tron Bonne, they are characterized as unquestioningly loyal followers who share a parent-child relationship with her. They are depicted as childlike in nature, lacking the capacity to understand the concept of morality or the illegality of the criminal actions they are tasked with performing.

Each Servbot fulfills a designated role, ranging from domestic chores to combat abilities. While small in size, the Servbots are shown to be effective combatants and are important to the exploits of Tron Bonne and her family as pirates. A frequent running gag within the series involve the incompetence or ineptitude of various Servbot units, leading to disastrous outcomes and consequently punishment from Tron. In spite of their inorganic nature, Servbots are depicted in series canon as being capable of consuming human food, such as curry.

== Appearances ==
=== Mega Man Legends ===
The Servbots first appear in Mega Man Legends as the Bonne family's crew and as opponents commanded by Tron during her attempts to rob Kattelox Island. They maintain the family's airship, the Gesellschaft, operate machinery and assist the Bonnes during combat and criminal operations.

Their role was substantially expanded in The Misadventures of Tron Bonne, a prequel titled Tron ni Kobun (トロンにコブン) in Japan. Tron commands forty Servbots, each of whom is assigned individual personality traits and statistics. Players may train and discipline them, assign them to missions and develop specialist abilities. Selected Servbots accompany Tron during action stages, where their effectiveness depends upon their individual skills and level of motivation. Near the game's conclusion, Tron's favourite Servbot becomes playable and leads the other Servbots in rescuing the captured Bonne family. The group later operates the Gustaff collectively during the battle against the Colossus.

In Mega Man Legends 2, the Servbots return as members of the Bonne crew and have developed a less consistently hostile relationship with Mega Man Volnutt.

Servbot characters have appeared in the manga adaptations of the Mega Man Legends series.

The Servbot is the titular character, under its original Japanese name Kobun, of a series of Japan-exclusive mobile spin-off titles of the Legends series released in the 2000s.

=== Other appearances ===
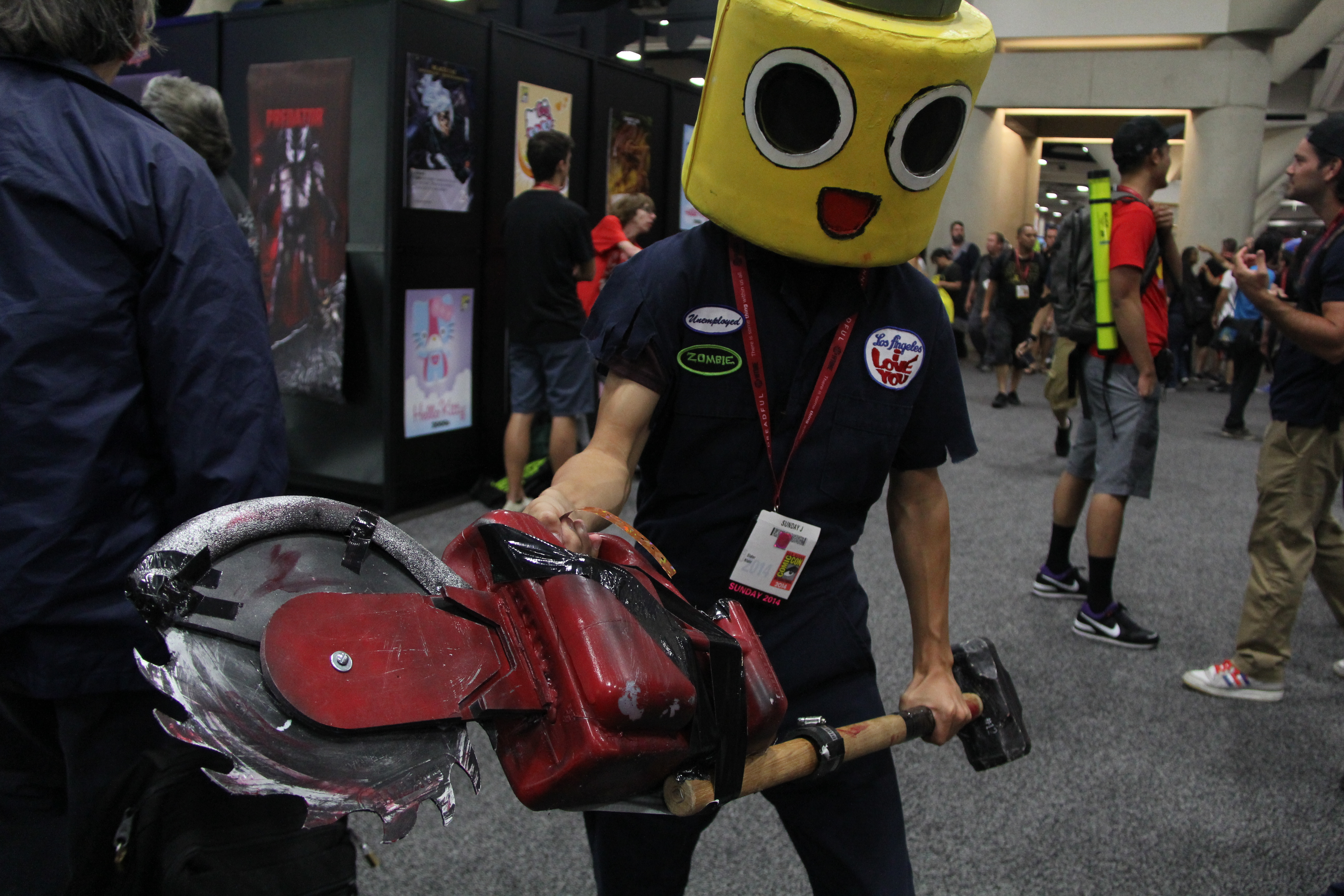
A cosplayer portraying Nick Ramos, the protagonist of Dead Rising 3, wearing a Servbot helmet

The Servbot design became a recurring reference in Capcom's Dead Rising series and has a prominent presence in the Dead Rising series as a form of intertextual reference. In the original game, Frank West can wear a large Servbot mask while fighting zombies. The mask subsequently returned in later entries, and coverage of Dead Rising 3 again highlighted its use as a weapon and costume item. Its association with the series was sufficiently recognisable that Wired referred to wearing a Servbot mask while discussing the possibility of a Dead Rising sequel. The Servbots' appearances in other games developed by Capcom include Bionic Commando, Street Fighter X Tekken, and Onimusha 3: Demon Siege.

Servbots also appear as playable characters, supporting characters or visual references in games including Marvel vs. Capcom 2: New Age of Heroes, Namco × Capcom, Project X Zone, Street Fighter X Tekken, Bionic Commando, and Onimusha 3: Demon Siege. The Servbot mask was incorporated into Frank West's attacks in his crossover fighting-game appearances, extending the connection established in Dead Rising.

== Promotion and merchandise ==
Capcom have used the Servbot character for various promotional purposes. The company gave away free Servbot-themed pudding to attendees at the 2000 Tokyo Game Show. In 2009, Capcom released a line of limited series Servbot-themed coffee mugs, which were only distributed in South Korea. The mugs were personally signed by Servbot creator Keiji Inafune, and contain a drawing of Mega Man on the underside. To promote the release of Dead Rising 2, the PlayStation Home service released an update in September 2010 which allowed players to acquire a Servbot helmet from the PlayStation Home Mall for their avatars. Servbot figures were placed alongside a statue of Mega Man at the lobby or reception area of Capcom's Tokyo branch office from 2009 until 2011, when they were replaced by statues of Felynes from the Monster Hunter franchise.

The Servbot was the first line of Bobble Budd branded figures to be produced by Multiverse Studios. According to creative director Alan Ning, it was one of several concepts that was originally pitched to retailers, which Capcom was quick to accept. Originally sold at San Diego Comic-Con 2010 and later on the Capcom Store, the bobblehead figures became a sales hit and quickly sold out, which encouraged Multiverse to produce more Bobble Budd figures for licensing and promotional work. Other noteworthy Servbot-themed merchandise include a collector’s pin featuring Tron Bonne riding a Servbot mecha, and plush toys.

== Critical reception ==
Critics have frequently singled out the Servbots as one of the most distinctive elements of the Mega Man Legends series. Ben Davis of Destructoid considered the Bonne family and Servbots among the games' strongest features because of their comic interactions. He described the Servbots as sufficiently sympathetic that attacking them could make the player feel guilty, and highlighted a story in which their attempt to establish a restaurant is mistaken for another bank robbery.

Neil Foster of Hardcore Gaming 101 attributed the development of The Misadventures of Tron Bonne partly to the breakout popularity achieved by Tron and the Servbots in the first Mega Man Legends. He argued that the Servbots frequently overshadow Tron, with her character functioning reactively to their questions and misbehaviour. Foster described them as responsible for many of the game's most entertaining moments and interpreted its management systems as evidence that the developers intended the Servbots to function as its real stars. Contemporary reviewers also praised the unusual structure of the spin-off. Jeff Lundrigan of Next Generation considered the game difficult to categorise by either genre or approach, while GamePro praised its lighthearted tone and variety, although it criticised its short length.

Mike Fahey of Kotaku argued that the Servbot design was suited to further use and merchandise, proposing a game in which Servbots would wear armour modelled on other Mega Man characters.

== See also ==
- Rabbids, a similar group of wild rabbit-like creatures in video games developed and published by Ubisoft.
- Minions (Despicable Me), a similar group of yellow childlike henchmen and published by Universal and Illumination.
- Grizzy & the Lemmings, the lemmings, a group of blue lemmings whose most known catchphrase is "Tabodi!"
