= Mega Man Legends 2 =

2000 video game

- North American PlayStation box art
- Developer: Capcom
- Publisher: Capcom
- Director: Yoshinori Kawano
- Producer: Keiji Inafune
- Artist: Hideki Ishikawa
- Writers: Yoshinori Kawano; Minoru Nakai; Junya Watanabe
- Composer: Makoto Tomozawa
- Series: Mega Man Legends
- Platforms: PlayStation, Microsoft Windows, PlayStation Portable
- Release: PlayStation: JP: April 20, 2000; NA: October 25, 2000; EU: August 3, 2001; Windows: JP: May 30, 2003; AS: 2003; PlayStation Portable: JP: September 8, 2005
- Genres: Action-adventure, third-person shooter
- Mode: Single-player

Mega Man Legends 2 (Note: known in Japan as Rockman Dash 2 - Episode 2: Ōinaru Isan (ロックマンDASH2 エピソード2 大いなる遺産, Rokkuman Dasshu Tsū - Episōdo Tsū: Ōinaru Isan; Rockman Dash 2 - Episode 2: Great Inheritance)) is a 2000 action-adventure game released by Capcom, acting as the sequel to Mega Man Legends. It was released for the PlayStation in 2000 for Japan and North America, and 2001 in Europe. Unchanged Japanese ports of the game were also released for the PC in Japan and parts of Asia in 2003 and for the PlayStation Portable in 2005. The game features Mega Man Volnutt's quest to find four keys hidden in the planet in order to aid in the search of the Mother Lode, a legendary treasure thought to be an infinite energy source.

A demo of the game was originally featured in the spin-off The Misadventures of Tron Bonne, with its purpose being to show an overview of the gameplay of the title despite having an independent story. Critical reception to Mega Man Legends 2 has overall been positive with video game publications praising how the graphics and the gameplay improved over the ones from its prequel. Additionally, the game's story was praised for how complex it is in comparison to the ones from the original series, but was criticized for its cliffhanger ending.

== Gameplay ==
The gameplay in Mega Man Legends 2 is very similar to that of its predecessor and has a few changes. The player controls the protagonist Mega Man Volnutt in his explorations through ruins and fights against Reaverbots. The ruins, however, are from various islands in contrast to the prequel in which most ruins belonged to Kattelox Island. The player is able to travel to other islands with Roll's ship, the Flutter, although he can only enter certain islands by completing different missions. Unlike Mega Man Legends in which the player could enter to different ruins by having the approval of Kattelox's mayor, here the player must pass different tests in order to win Digger licenses from a specific level. The license allows Mega Man to enter into ruins which are forbidden to lower-class Diggers. Additionally, when winning a license, the Reaverbots' health is higher, but once they are destroyed, they drop more refractors' shards which are used in shops to buy items. Mega Man's interactions with other characters can also affect the character's state depending whether he is good with other people or makes them angry. Mega Man is also able to grab objects or people which help the player to complete missions. Mega Man can also suffer from special damage when fighting Reaverbots or touching fields that damage him such as lava. If the player equips Mega Man with a specific body part, he will become invulnerable to such states. Another addition is the underwater dungeon, in where the objects' weight is reduced and Mega Man can jump higher. The energy of the special weapons, which are developed by Roll using unusable items, are now shown in two energy bars, one green and one blue. The blue bar indicates how much energy the weapon has, while the green bar shows how much energy is consumed when the weapon is used.

== Plot ==
=== Setting and characters ===
Mega Man Legends 2 brings back several characters from its predecessor. This includes the protagonist Mega Man Volnutt (whose original name is Mega Man Trigger), a Digger in charge of exploring ruins to find Refractors, Roll Caskett, his spotter, who is searching for her missing parents, and Data, a mechanical monkey who contains all of Mega Man's original memories. Roll's grandfather, Barrel Caskett, also appears alongside his old friend Werner Von Bluecher in search of the Mother Lode, a legendary treasure supposed to have infinite energy. The pirates "the Bonnes", made up of siblings Teisel, Tron, and Bon, and their Servbot followers, return once again as antagonists of the series but allied with three new members: a blonde-haired man named Glyde previously seen in The Misadventures of Tron Bonne who uses Birdbots as servants, and Bola and Klaymoor, a floating samurai and an enormous man wearing armor, respectively. Other characters include Yuna and Sera, whose purposes remain unknown during the game's start, as well as the Master: a 3000-year-old man who is referred to as the last "true" human.

=== Story ===
A news conference is held by Professor Barrel Caskett and his old friend Werner Von Bluecher about the upcoming journey to the Forbidden Island in a large airship called the Sulphur Bottom to search for the Mother Lode. Barrel recognizes a reporter, Yuna, as his lost daughter, Matilda Caskett, who warns them of the catastrophe that could transpire if they pursue their journey. Yuna escapes with her servant, a Reaverbot flying machine-like being named Gatz to break the windows for her escape. Ignoring her warning Bluecher continues to the center of the island. Yuna orders Gatz to give warning shots but due to the hostile retaliation of the Sulphur Bottom, Gatz damages the engine, forcing the airship to descend to the island below.

Mega Man Volnutt and Roll Caskett watch the events from television and decide to rescue them. With Roll's help, Mega Man makes his way to the center of the island and in the process releases a girl called Sera and her servant Geetz, both of whom go to the Sulphur Bottom. Geetz tells Bluecher and Barrel that the Mother lode can be accessed by means of four keys. Bluecher and Barrel ask Mega Man if he could retrieve the keys before the Pirates who heard their conversation with Geetz.

Mega Man along with Roll set forth to find the four Keys in the Manda, Nino, Saul Kada and Calinca Ruins, while battling the Pirates, most often the Bonne Family, along the way. When Mega Man returns with the final key to the Sulphur Bottom, Sera orders Geetz to attack the ship and take the keys. Yuna appears in the ship and orders Gatz to fight Geetz. Mega Man stumbles upon Yuna, who then gives some reminder about his former life and explains to him the terrible catastrophe she was trying to prevent: Sera's plans for the execution of the "Carbon Reinitialization Program", meant to kill every human from Terra and revive the original humans. Soon after, Mega Man reaches the deck of the Sulphur Bottom and sees Gatz defeated by Geetz. Mega Man is able to defeat Geetz, who, using his last forces, seriously damages Mega Man.

While recovering, Mega Man starts to explore his past. In his dreams he sees himself and a man known as "Master" going to Terra and giving Mega Man his "Genetic Code" before dying and requesting that Mega Man destroy the system that can start the Carbon Reinitialization Program. Yuna tells Mega Man to choose whether to follow what the System wants him to do or oppose it.

Mega Man then takes a flight in a ship merged with Gatz heading for the planet Elysium with Yuna. In Elysium, Mega Man reaches the room where the Carbon Reinitialization Program is to be executed from. Sera then appears in the form of a robot to Mega Man and states that she did not execute the Carbon Reinitialization Program but has, instead, been waiting for Mega Man's arrival to challenge him in hopes that by defeating him she would prove that their master liked her more. In battle, Gatz tries to aid Mega Man by attacking Sera's logic circuits, but dies in the attempt. As Mega Man defeats Sera, Yuna arrives at the scene reminding Sera that it is not their Master's wish for her to die. Sera awakes in Yuna's real body and decides to help Yuna protect the Carbons from the machines that are being activated in Terra due to an old system Master tried to stop. However, due to Gatz's death, Mega Man, Sera and Yuna are now stranded in Elysium with no means of transporting back to Terra any time soon. The game ends with Roll and other characters working together to build a rocket to rescue Mega Man from Elysium.

== Development and release ==
In 1999, Capcom announced that the series' spin-off, The Misadventures of Tron Bonne, would include a demo of the game. The demo was meant to show off the game's improved graphics and a larger scale universe. The demo, titled Rockman Dash 2 - Episode 1: Roll's Critical Moment (ロックマンＤＡＳＨ２ エピソード１ ロールちゃん危機一髪！, Rokkuman DASH 2 Episōdo 1 Rōruchan Kiki Ippatsu), features an independent story in which Tron has kidnapped Roll and Mega Man sets to rescue her. It was only included in the Japanese version of the game and the PlayStation Portable port of the game. The game was released for the PlayStation in 2000 in Japan, as a regular release and another one under the label of "PlayStation the Best". It was later released in 2000 in North America and in 2001 in Europe. Unchanged Japanese ports of the game were also released for the PC in 2001. Work also began on a Nintendo 64 port of the game, but the project was cancelled due to the poor sales of the original Legends on N64 with the console being near the end of its life cycle at the time.

In September 2005, Capcom ported the game to the PlayStation Portable but it was only published in Japan. Like the preceding game, the music was composed by Makoto Tomozawa with the ending theme used in the Japanese version being Hara Fumina's "Naite Ii Yo" (泣いていいよ; lit. "It's All Right to Cry"). In October 2009, Capcom released Capcom Special Selection Rockman Dash 2 (CAPCOM SPECIAL SELECTION ロックマンDASH2), which is composed of a soundtrack including 17 tracks from the game and an artbook. The artbook also shows characters which were not featured in the game with all of them sharing the name of Mega Man like Mega Man Volnutt and Mega Man Juno. Producer Keiji Inafune comments that he was asked by several fans if a sequel to Mega Man Legends 2 would be made. Inafune expressed desire in making, but at first stated that he could not do it.

== Reception ==
Reception

Aggregate scores
Aggregator	Score
GameRankings	76.60%
Metacritic	76/100

Review scores
Publication	Score
AllGame	3.5/5
Eurogamer	8/10
Famitsu	30/40
GameRevolution	B
GameSpot	8.2/10
IGN	8.1/10
Next Generation	3/5
Official U.S. PlayStation Magazine	3.5/5

The game was generally well received by critics in comparison to its predecessor. GameSpot directly stated that with Legends 2's release, Capcom was able to turn "what began as a mere spin-off into a worthy stand-alone franchise", while Allgame's Jon Thompson stated it "trumps its predecessor in almost every way, and shows that Capcom is certainly learning from its mistakes in the genre". IGN's Adam Cleveland mentioned Mega Man Legends 2 was "the most involving game I've seen with Mega Man, and is one of the best, too". Publications commented that the gameplay was highly improved and that the variations of controls helped the players. Despite being compared with other games such as the ones from the Zelda franchise, the dungeons and missions were praised. Boss fights were also found to be entertaining, although some of the bosses' heights are larger than the ones featured in the first game. Famitsu found that the game's overall sense of action was superior to the first incarnation, considering the ability to be assisted in missions by computer controlled characters as well as its mini-games and events.

The graphics received a mixed to positive reception. The graphic design and style was praised, but reviewers criticized the level design, saying it was still blocky and primitive. The story and cutscene animation were universally praised, and compared to watching an anime. In comparison to the first game, the story was also found to be darker and deeper. Eurogamer also focused on this, finding the game's story to be a more "rolling narrative rather than a simple 'click the face, beat the boss, save the world' sort of cop-out" comparing it with the original 2D series. Sound effects and music were likewise well-received, with the exception of Mega Man's voice, which was derided as too feminine.

Samuel Bass reviewed the PlayStation version of the game for Next Generation, rating it three stars out of five, and stated that "A fun game held back by pig-headed camera design."

GameRankings had an average of 76.60% for the PS version, while Metacritic had 76 favorable reviews out of 100 for it. In a 2007 retrospective of the Mega Man series, Jeremy Parish of 1UP.com ranked Mega Man Legends 2 as "Worth it!", praising its graphical improvements over the first title and commenting that its unresolved ending is "one of gaming's greatest injustices". In a similar feature, GameSpot stated that the game could "fix lot of the flaws in the original and [Mega Man Legends 2] is a substantial improvement upon the Legends formula". 1UP.com analyzed Legends 2's ending and found it unfortunate as the plot involving the Elder System mentioned in the game's ending remained unresolved.

The PlayStation version of Mega Man Legends 2 was the 139th best-selling video game in Japan in 2000 at 88,131 units sold. The PSP version of the game barely made it into the Famitsu top 500 best-sellers list in Japan for 2005 at a mere 15,309 units sold by the end of the year.
