= FOM =

FOM may refer to:

== Air transport ==
- Fillmore Municipal Airport (FAA LID code: FOM), an airport in Utah, United States
- Foumban Nkounja Airport (IATA code: FOM), an airport in Cameroon
- Freedom Air (ICAO code: FOM), a defunct low-cost airline

== Education ==
- Faculty of Occupational Medicine (Ireland), in the Republic of Ireland
- Faculty of Occupational Medicine (United Kingdom), in the United Kingdom
- FOM University of Applied Sciences, a German university

== Organizations ==
- Federación Obrera de Magallanes, a Chilean trade union
- Fraternal Order of Moai, a North American social club
- Free Officers Movement
- Friends of Maldives
- Friends of Mongolia
- Friends of Oswald Mosley, a British fascist organisation
- Public Opinion Foundation (FOM), a Russian polling firm

== Other uses ==
- Face of Mankind, a multiplayer online role-playing game
- MLB Front Office Manager, a video game
- Federation of Malaya, now part of Malaysia
- Figure of merit, a performance metric
- Formula One Management, a racing promoter
- Foundations of mathematics
- Freedom of Movement, free travel in the EU
- Front Office Manager (disambiguation)
- Fundusz Obrony Morskiej, a defunct fund-raising venture of the Polish government
- Federation Object Model (FOM) in High Level Architecture (HLA), used in multiple domains including defense, security and civilian applications

== See also ==
- fom, ISO 639 code of the Foma language
- Phom (disambiguation)
