= Nicktoons MLB =

Nickelodeon video game

- North American cover for the Wii version
- Developer: High Voltage Software (X360, Wii); Black Lantern Studios (DS, 3DS)
- Publisher: 2K
- Platform: Nintendo 3DS; Nintendo DS; Wii; Xbox 360
- Release: Xbox 360, Wii, Nintendo DS: NA: September 13, 2011; EU: October 21, 2011; Nintendo 3DS: NA: March 6, 2012
- Genre: Baseball game
- Modes: Single-player, Multiplayer

Nicktoons MLB is a baseball video game released for the Xbox 360, Wii, Nintendo DS, and Nintendo 3DS platforms. The game was developed by High Voltage Software and published by 2K in 2011. It features playable characters from Nickelodeon shows including SpongeBob SquarePants, Invader Zim, The Ren & Stimpy Show, Danny Phantom, Planet Sheen, Avatar: The Last Airbender, Fanboy & Chum Chum, T.U.F.F. Puppy, and The Adventures of Jimmy Neutron, Boy Genius. Two characters only are playable in the 3DS version. One of them is the titular character Jimmy Neutron, and the other is from the Nickelodeon game Monkey Quest. Characters from Rugrats, Rocko's Modern Life, Aaahh!!! Real Monsters, Hey Arnold!, The Angry Beavers, CatDog, El Tigre: The Adventures of Manny Rivera, Back at the Barnyard, and The Mighty B! make cameo appearances in the game's loading screens. In addition to Nickelodeon characters and some fictional baseball teams, the game also features players from real Major League Baseball teams. The game's announcers are Perch Perkins from SpongeBob SquarePants and GIR from Invader Zim.

The Nintendo 3DS version also has more stadiums and modes. Both console versions allow the player to choose between traditional pad-based controls or motion controls, with the Wii version implementing the former with the Classic Controller and the Xbox 360 version implementing the latter with the Kinect sensor.

== Gameplay ==
Gameplay of all versions of the game is similar to The Bigs and The Bigs 2. The game contains all the MLB teams along with the all-star teams and fictional Nicktoons teams in standard quick play games. For quick play games, 5 Nicktoons characters that have special abilities can be selected by each side. A few realistic baseball players from the chosen team also take part at bat and on the field. The game contains 6 fictional Nicktoons ballparks (7 in the 3DS version) and 6 real-life MLB ballparks (8 in the 3DS version) compared to the full MLB ballpark lineups in both The Bigs games.

There is also a tournament mode, where the player plays as any MLB team or a full team of Nicktoons characters to win a best-of-three-game series against other teams.

One of the game's other modes is called Distance Derby. This takes place in one of the fictional Nicktoons stadiums. The player selects an MLB player or Nicktoons character and tries to score points by hitting targets above the outfield. After one player scores 100,000 points, a turbo hit is activated for a game-winning hit.

Once the player beats a certain team or does something important in a game or Distance Derby, a card is unlocked. All of the player's cards are in a collection. If the achievement is done twice, the card will turn from Bronze to Silver. Doing so again will make it gold.

== Reception ==
Reception

Aggregate score
Aggregator	Score
GameRankings	Xbox 360: 65.00%

Nicktoons MLB has received mixed reviews from critics. Operation Sports gave the game 4 out of 10, stating "As it is, you should only buy this for the Nickelodeon characters or if you are dying to play a Kinect baseball game. Otherwise, just treat yourself and your kids to The Bigs 2, a game with more polish and much more to do. Then, when you are done, watch SpongeBob." Official Xbox Magazine gave the game a score of 6.5 out of 10, saying "Nicktoons MLB is fun but frivolous, which should work just fine for kids and families". They also both praised and criticized the usage of Kinect, saying "having your arm angle determine the pitch type is downright genius — though sadly, occasional gaffes (such as seeing swings you didn't take) muddle the execution".

However, there have been some positive reviews as well. 123Kinect said "If you are buying this for yourself and are older it's probably around a 6/10, you will notice the flaws, which is why I rated it at 7, it's one of those on the fence titles. It's by far no means a real MLB title, however, it's a step in the right direction." Anime Courtyard also gave it a 7 out of 10, stating "At the end we can say that Nicktoons MLB is not spectacular but not a bad option if you want a baseball game without complications. For children, a good game if they like the Nicktoons. And of course for a grown up who wants a trip on memory lane with their favorite Nickelodeon characters." Nintendo World Report's review gave the game an 8 out of 10, concluding with, "Nicktoons MLB is a simplified but very fun baseball game. Don't let the kid-focused presentation scare you off; this game is worth a look from anyone in the mood for an arcade baseball game.
