= List of tourist attractions in Penang =

Tourist attractions in Penang, Malaysia

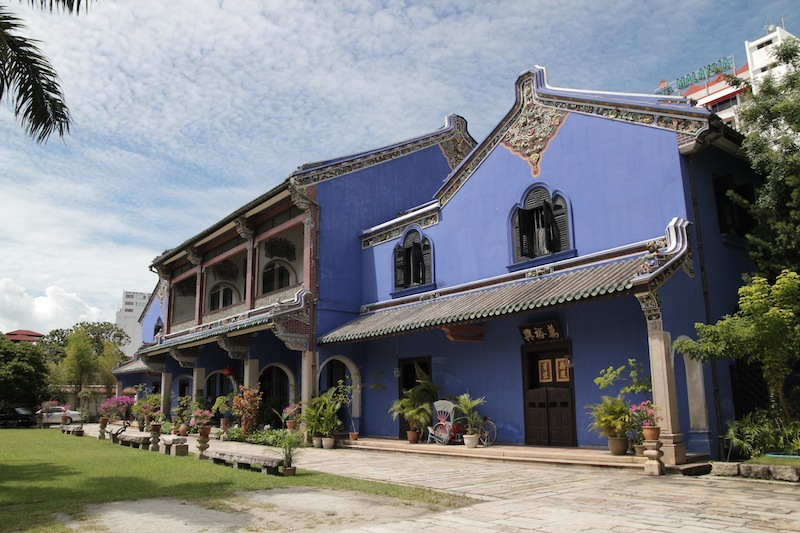
Cheong Fatt Tze Mansion

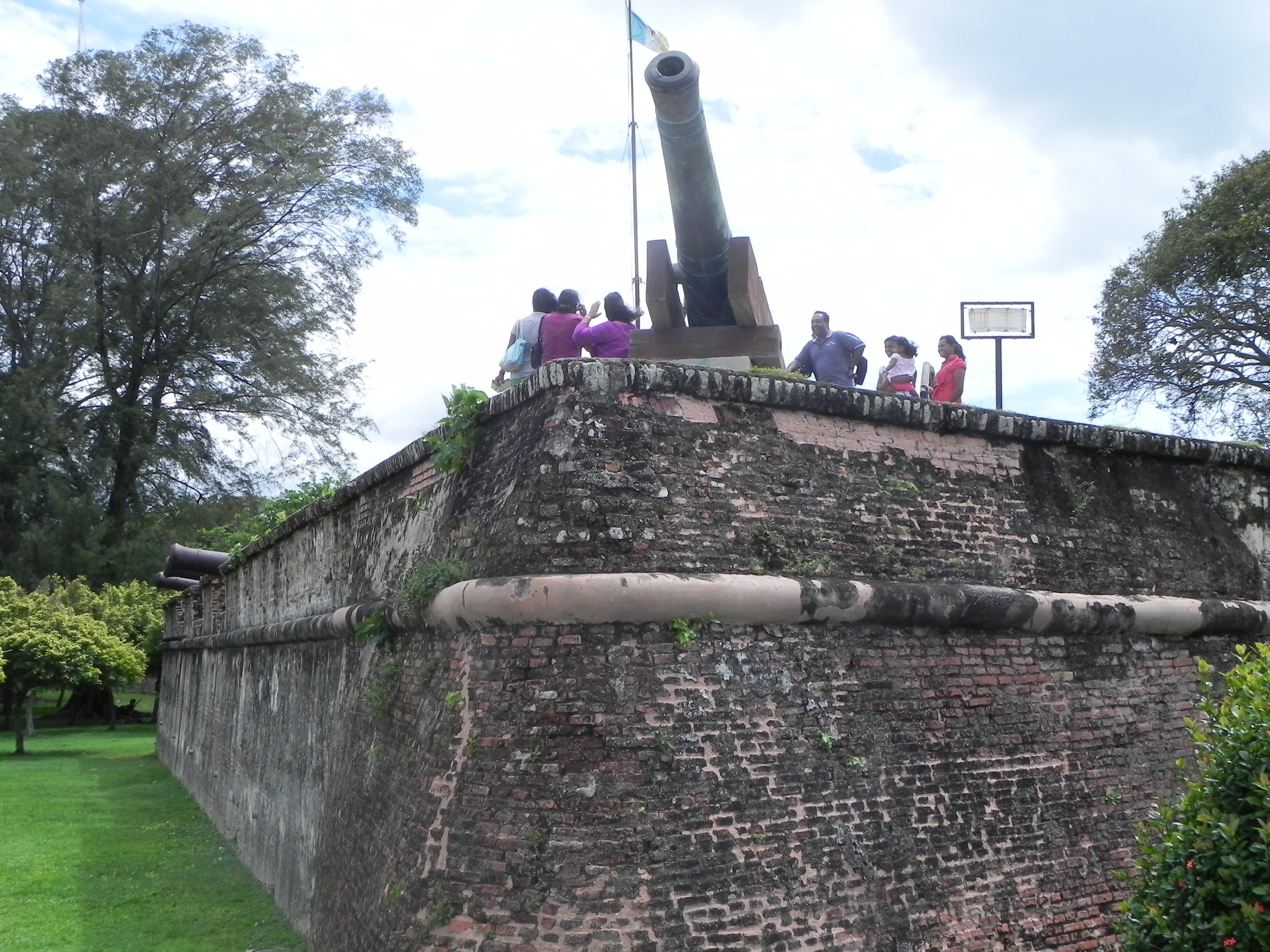
Fort Cornwallis

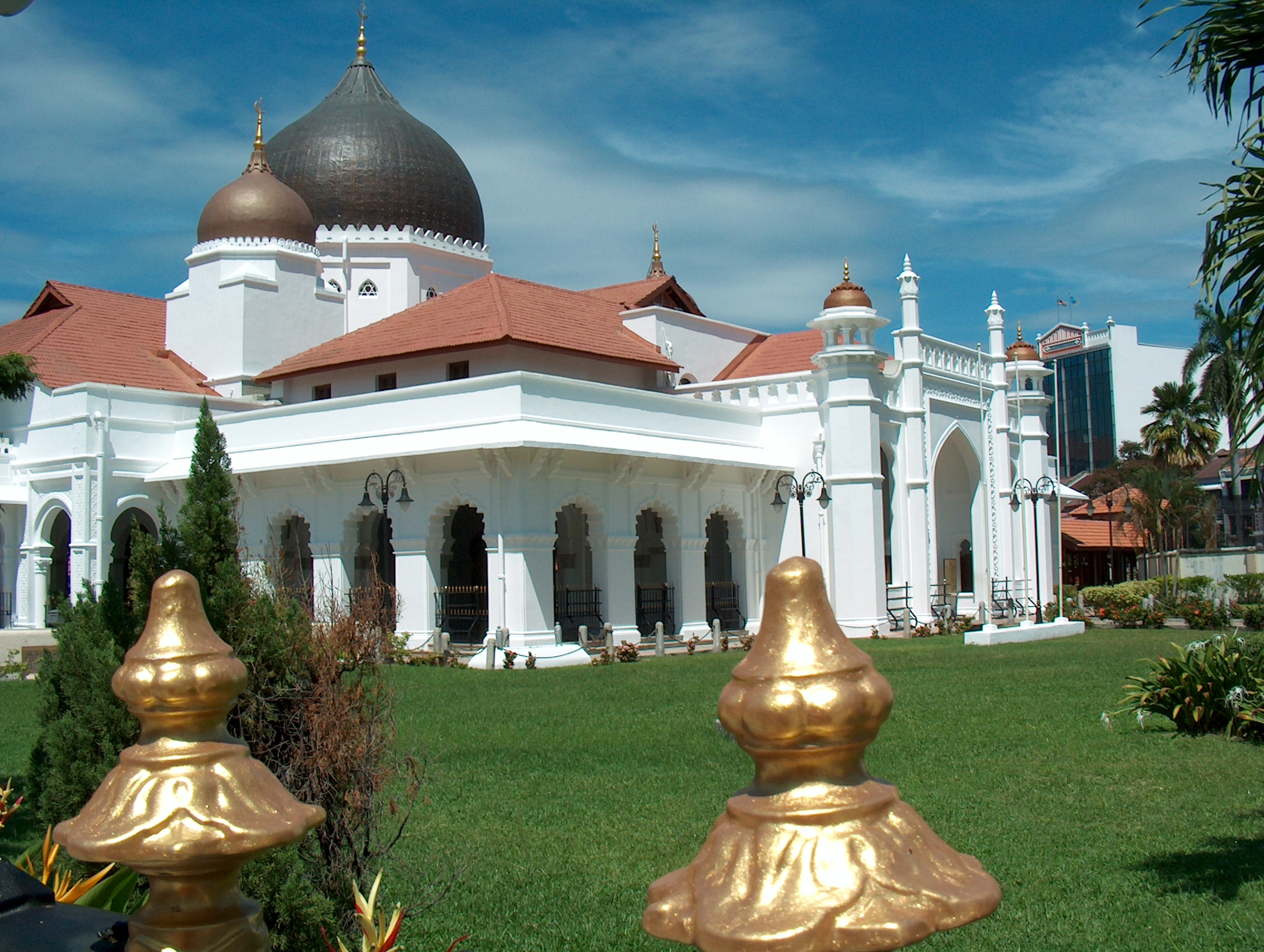
Kapitan Keling Mosque

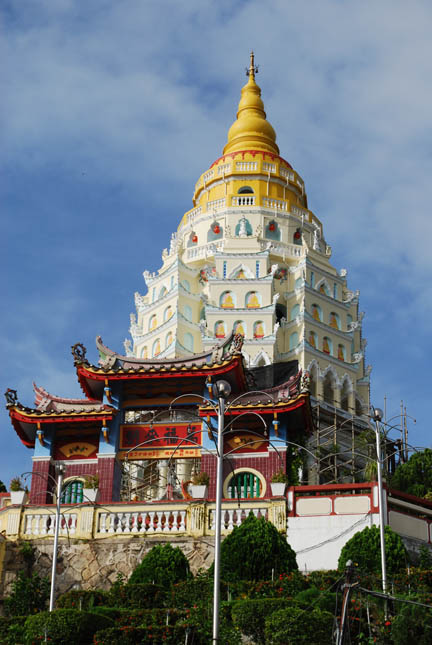
Kek Lok Si Temple

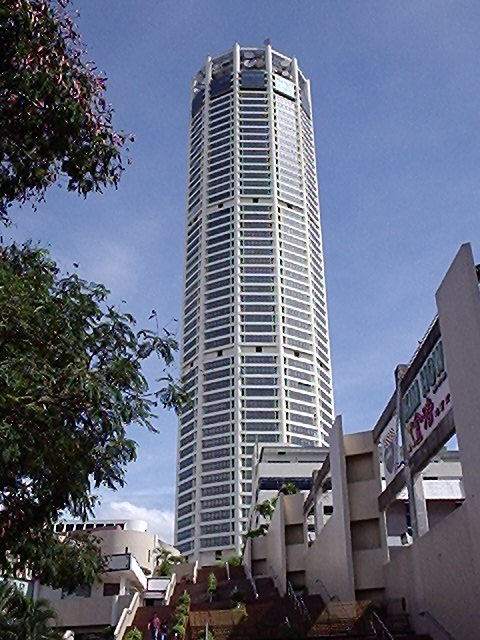
Komtar

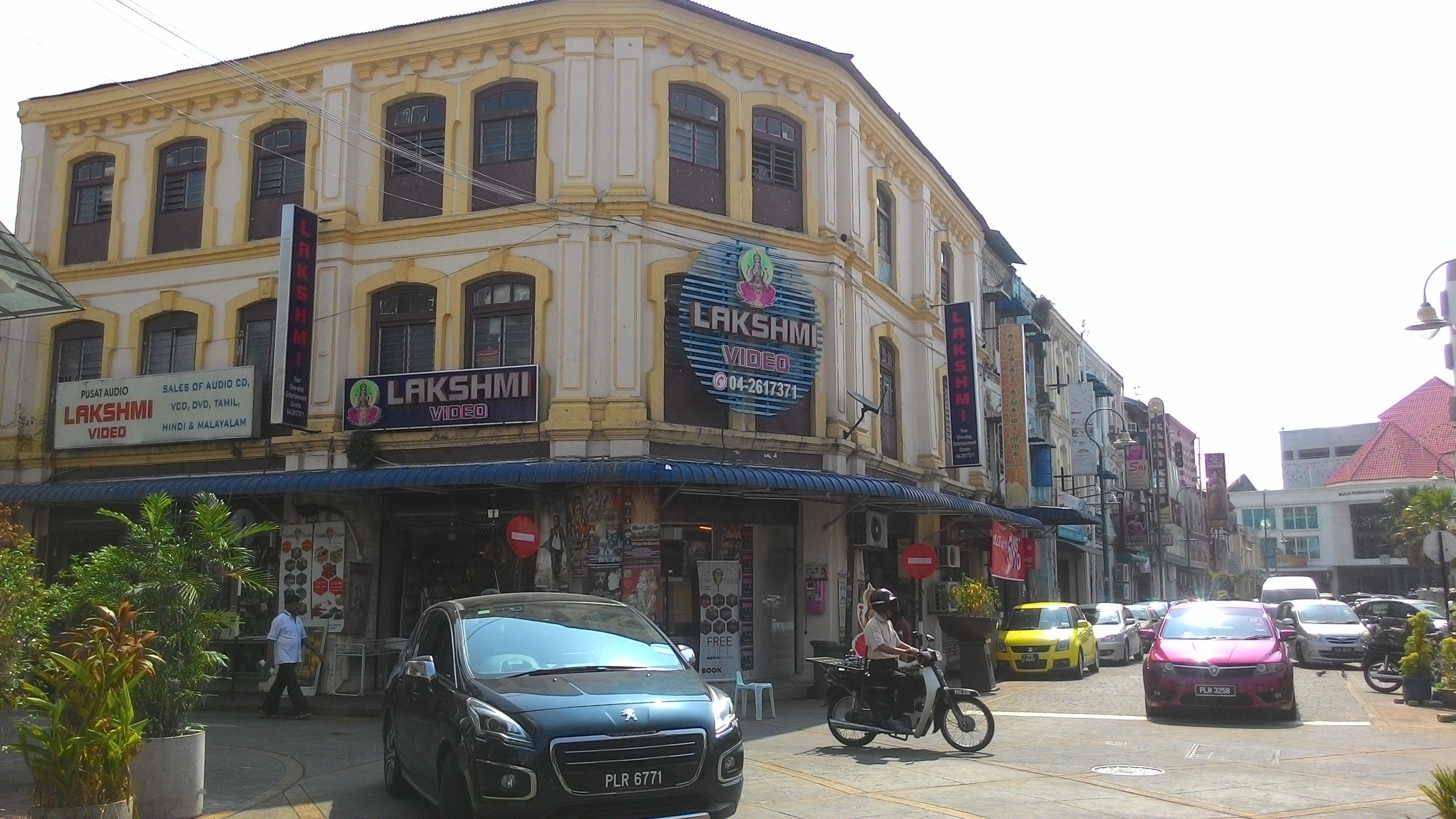
Little India

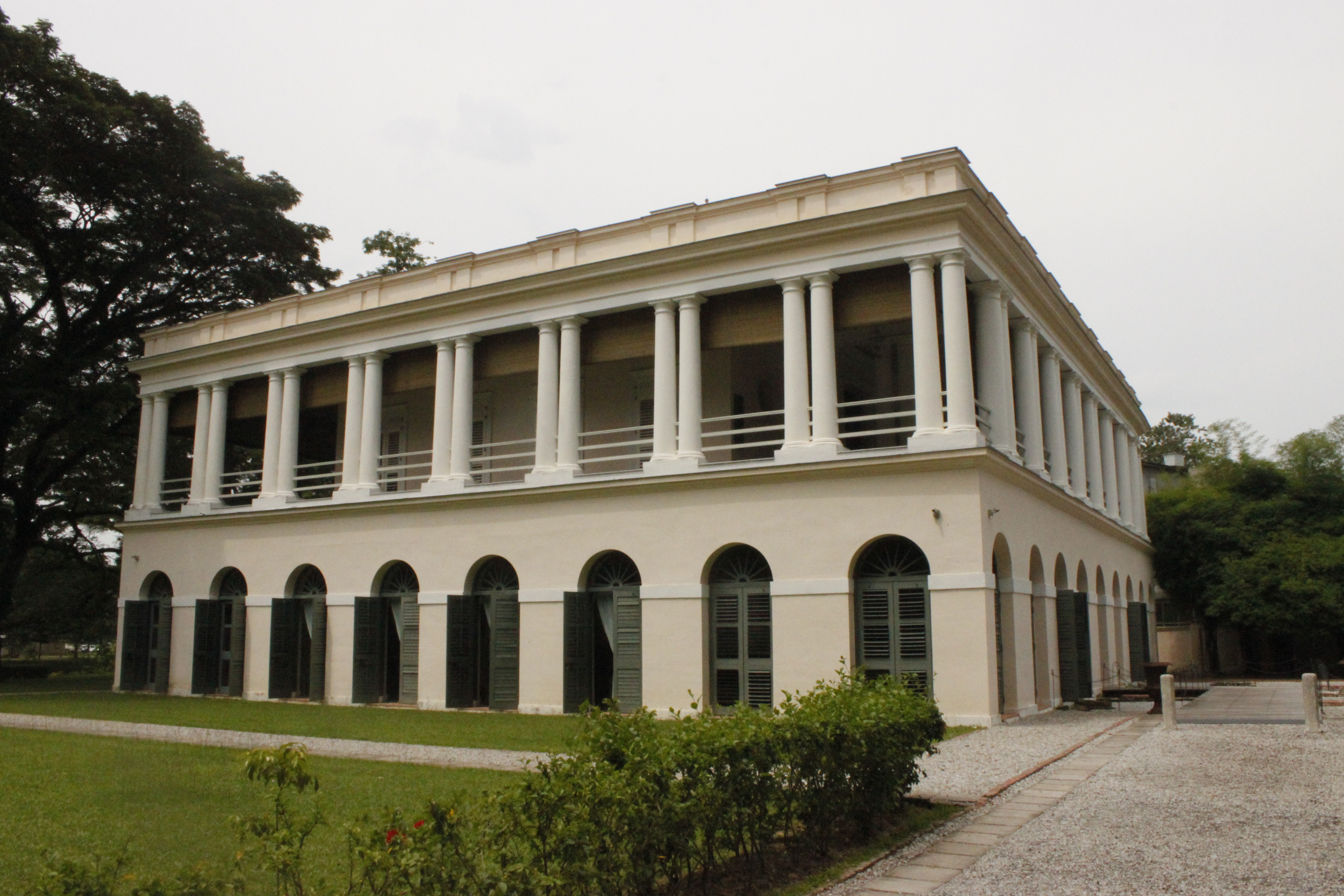
Suffolk House

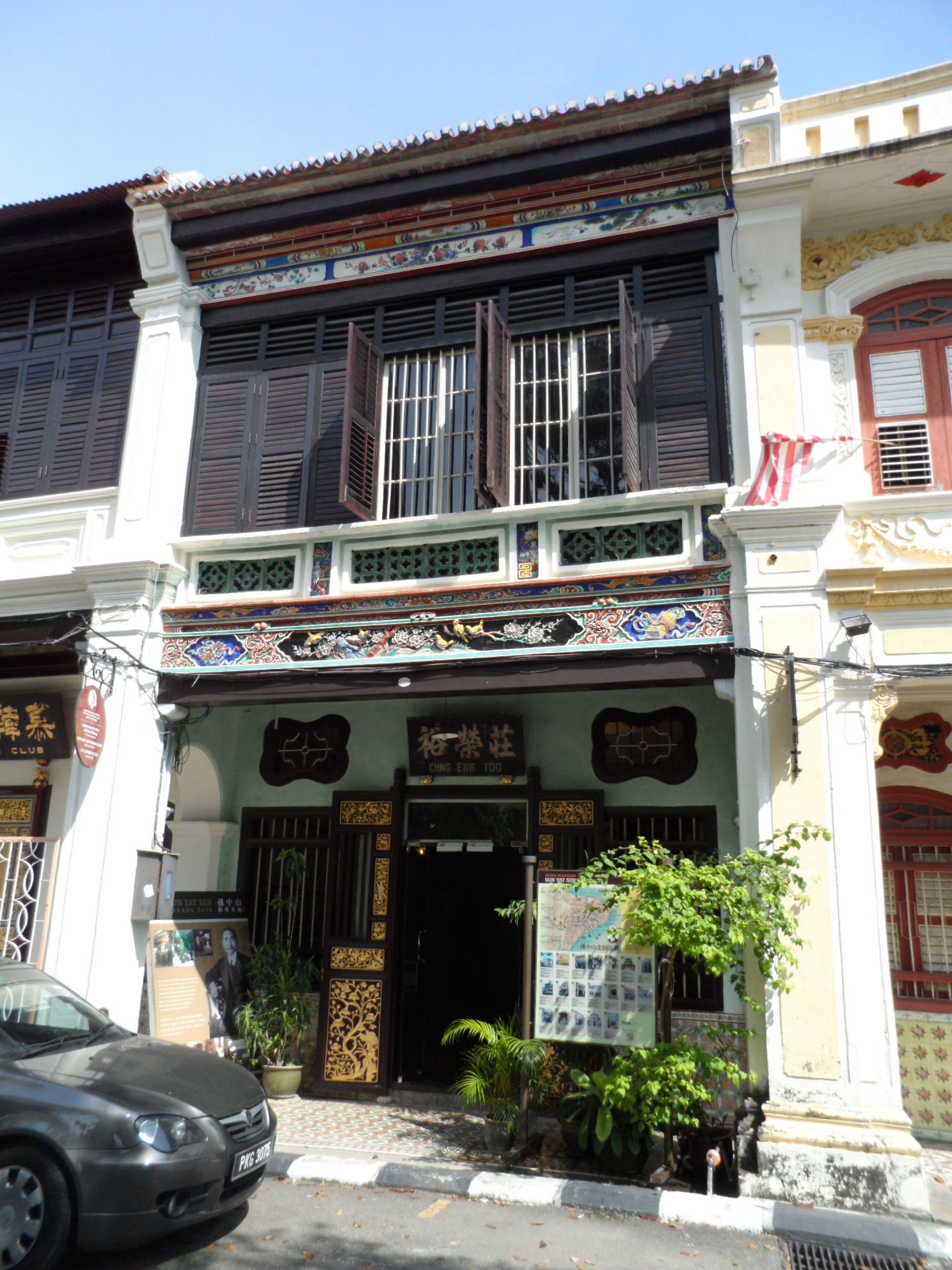
Sun Yat-sen Museum

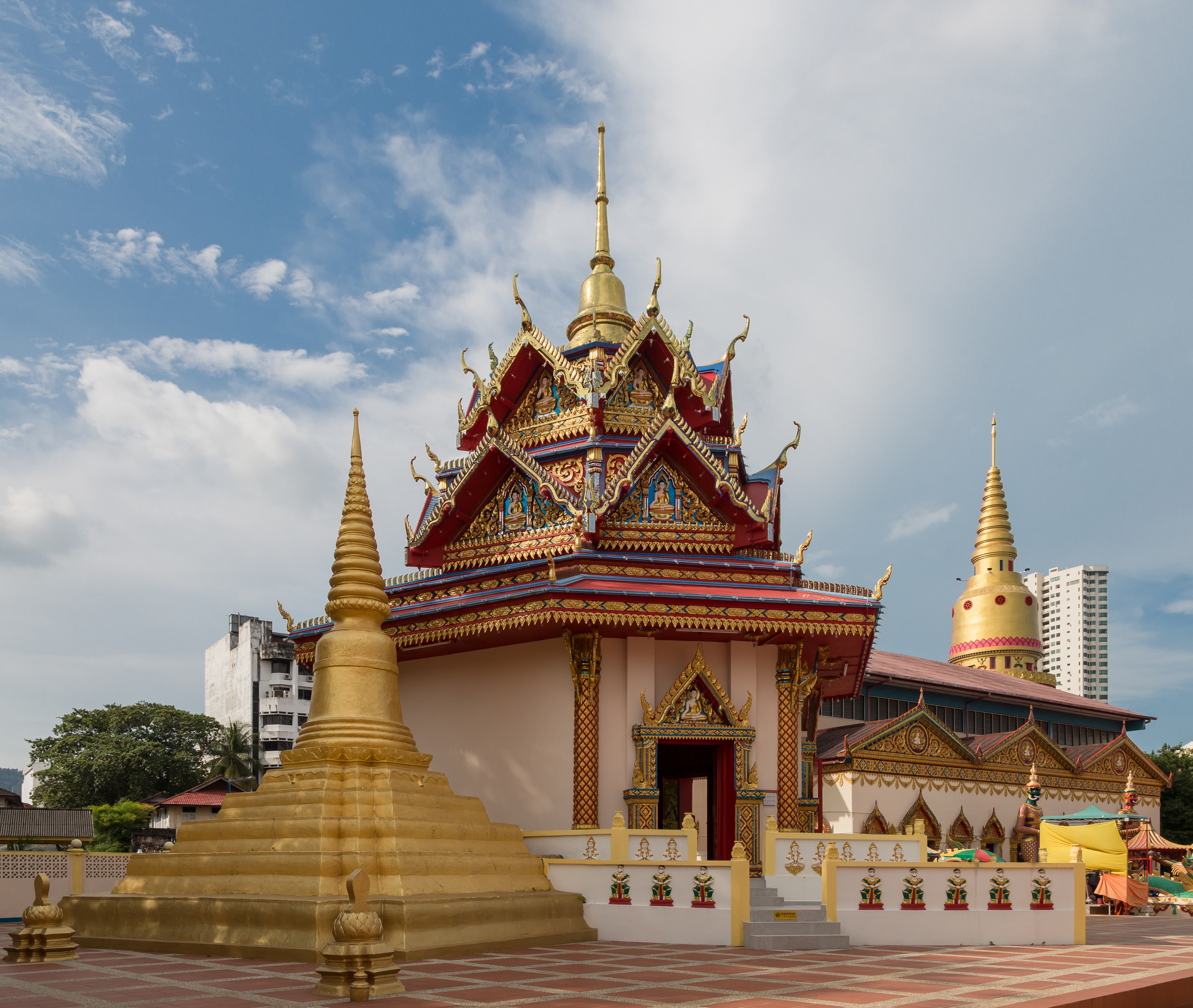
Wat Chaiyamangkalaram

This is an incomplete list of tourist attractions in Penang, Malaysia.

== Beaches ==
- Batu Ferringhi
- Tanjung Bungah

== Cultural enclaves ==
- Kampung Siam
- Little India

== Farms ==
- Tropical Fruit Farm

== Galleries ==
- Hin Bus Depot

== Hills ==
- Penang Hill
- Mertajam Hill (Bukit Mertajam Forest Park)

== Historical buildings ==
- Cheong Fatt Tze Mansion
- City Hall
- Eastern & Oriental Hotel
- Eng Chuan Tong Tan Kongsi
- Fort Cornwallis
- Fort Cornwallis Lighthouse
- High Court
- India House
- Khoo Kongsi
- Old Protestant Cemetery
- Pinang Peranakan Mansion
- Standard Chartered Bank building
- State Assembly Building
- Suffolk House
- The Residency
- Town Hall

== Memorials ==
- Cenotaph
- Queen Victoria Memorial Clock Tower
- Francis Light Memorial

== Museums ==
- Batik Painting Museum
- Camera Museum
- Pulau Pinang (Penang Ferry Museum)
- Penang House of Music
- Penang Islamic Museum
- Penang Toy Museum
- State Museum and Art Gallery
- Sun Yat-sen Museum

== Public spaces ==
- Esplanade
- Gurney Bay
- Karpal Singh Drive
- Sia Boey Urban Archaeological Park

== Nature ==
- Botanic Gardens
- Penang National Park
- City Park

== Zoos ==
- Entopia (Penang Butterfly Farm)
- Penang Aquarium
- Penang Bird Park

== Religious places ==
=== Buddhist temples ===
- Dhammikarama Burmese Temple
- Wat Chaiyamangkalaram
- Wat Buppharam
- Mahindarama Temple
- Kek Lok Si
- Nibbinda Forest Monastery
- Goddess of Mercy Temple

=== Chinese/Taoist temples ===
- Snake Temple
- Thean Kong Thnuah Temple

=== Churches ===
- Church of Divine Mercy
- Church of the Assumption
- Church of the Immaculate Conception
- Church of the Risen Christ
- Holy Spirit Cathedral
- St. Anne's Church
- St. George's Church

=== Hindu temples ===
- Arulmigu Balathandayuthapani Temple
- Arulmigu Karumariamman Temple
- Jalan Baru Sri Muniswarar Temple
- Nattukkottai Chettiar Temple
- Sree Maha Mariamman Devasthanam Temple
- Sri Mahamariamman Temple

=== Mosques ===
- Kapitan Keling Mosque
- Acheen Street Mosque
- State Mosque
- Penang Floating Mosque

== Sport centres ==
- City Stadium
- Han Chiang Indoor Stadium
- Setia SPICE (Penang International Sports Arena)
- Penang Sports Club
- Penang State Stadium
- Penang Turf Club
- USM Stadium

== Shopping centres ==
- 1st Avenue Mall
- City Junction
- Design Village
- GAMA Supermarket & Departmental Store
- Gurney Paragon
- Gurney Plaza
- ICT Digital Mall
- Island 88
- M Mall O2O
- Penang Plaza
- Penang Times Square
- Prangin Mall
- Queensbay Mall
- Straits Quay
- Sunshine Square
- Sunway Carnival Mall
- Udini Square

== Skyscrapers ==
- 8 Gurney
- Arte S
- Ascott Gurney Penang
- BHL Tower
- City Residence
- Gurney Paragon
- Komtar
- Mansion One
- Marriott Residences Penang
- MBf Tower
- Millennium Tower
- Muze @ PICC
- Setia V
- The Cove
- The Maritime

== Theme Parks ==
- Escape Park

== Festivals ==
Penang is also known for a wide variety of festivals, due to its vibrant multiethnic and multireligious society. Among the annual cultural and religious festivities in Penang are as follows.

- Chingay Parade
- Chinese New Year
- Jade Emperor's Birthday or Tian Gong Dan (天公誕)
- Chap Goh Meh
- Songkran
- Qingming Festival
- Wesak
- Thaipusam
- Thai Pongal
- Vaisakhi
- Feast of St. Anne
- Hari Raya Aidilfitri
- Hari Raya Aidiladha
- Awal Muharram
- Hungry Ghost Month
- Mid-Autumn Festival
- Deepavali
- Mawlid (Muhammad's birthday)
- Christmas

== See also ==
- List of tourist attractions in Malaysia
