= Oujda Group =

Gathering in Algeria during its War of Independence

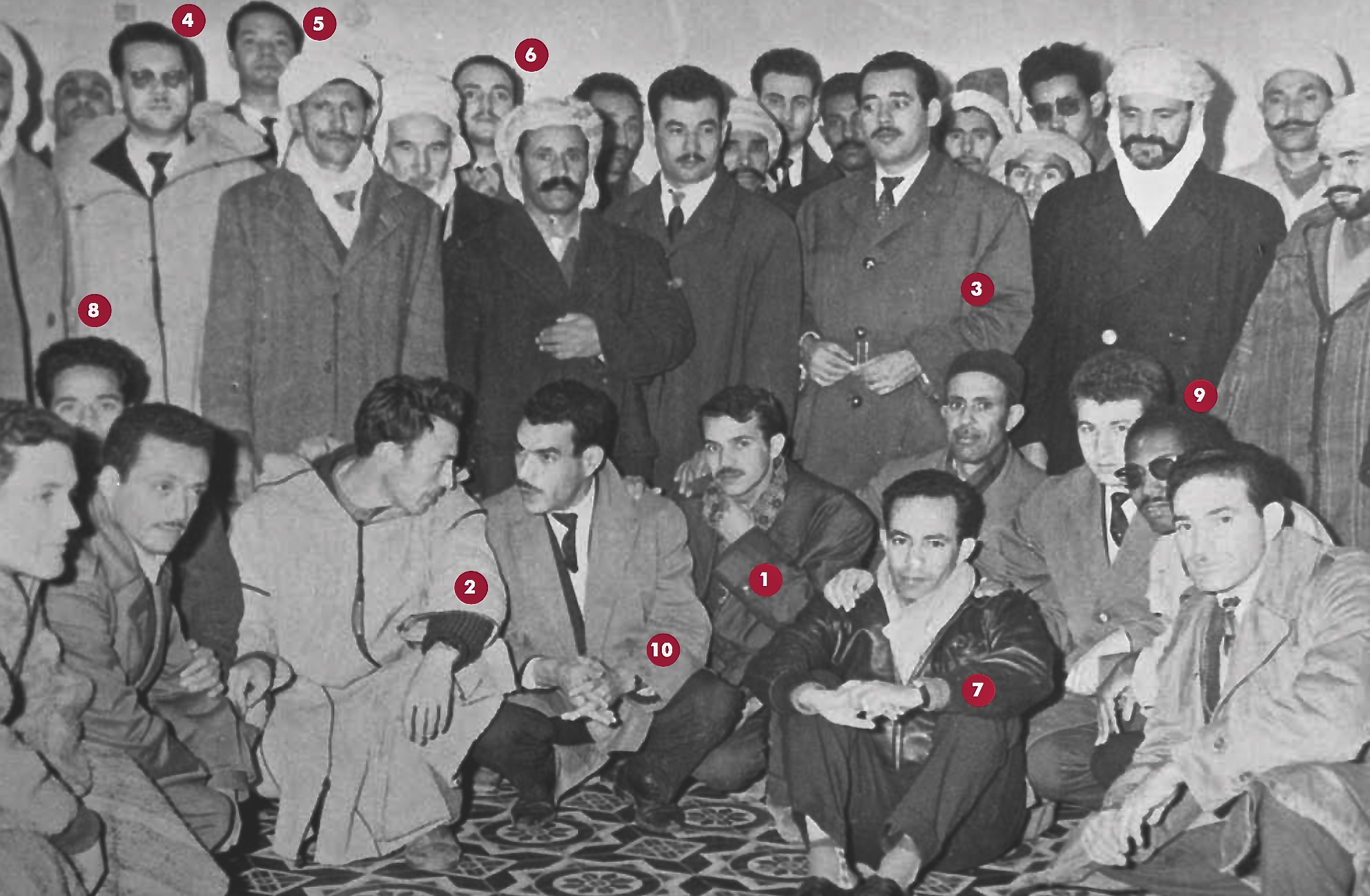
Oujda group in 1958

The Oujda group, also known as the Oujda clan, was a group of military officers and politicians in Algeria that operated during the Algerian War (1954–62). After the independence of Algeria, the Oujda group dominated Algerian politics after the Algerian summer crisis in 1962.

== History ==
The Oujda group was formed around Col. Houari Boumédiène, posted in the Moroccan town of Oujda. He would later become chief of staff in the National Liberation Army (ALN), which was the armed wing of the National Liberation Front (FLN), the main nationalist organization fighting French colonial control over Algeria.

As chief of staff, Boumédiène entered into conflict with the FLN's government-in-exile, the GPRA, which towards the end of the war attempted to dismiss him. He then supported an alliance of FLN politicians against the GPRA's provisional post-independence government, and marched the ALN towards Algiers to occupy it. The GPRA was supported by Wilayas III (Kabylia) and IV (Algérois), and the Oujda group was supported by the border army. The border army defeated the GPRA and entered Algiers on 9 September 1962. Ahmed Ben Bella became the president of Algeria, and Boumédiène minister of defense. In this role Boumédiène continued to exercise a powerful influence over the regime, through the Algerian military. To secure his grip over the army, he began promoting and supporting his old friends and colleagues of the Oujda group. These men and their entourage became known as the Oujda group, forming a powerful pro-Boumédiène faction within the political and military ranks of the one-party state, but in their turn dependent on him for their positions.

After rising tension between the two men and their supporters, Ben Bella in 1965 confronted Boumédiène by attempting to dismiss his close associate, foreign minister Abdelaziz Bouteflika, and by announcing that he soon would be reassigning responsibilities within the army. Boumédiène reacted by staging a military coup d'état, in which Ben Bella was "disappeared" (years later, he was released after having been held isolated in house arrest), and taking personal control over the country by means of a military junta. His associates from Oujda then became the pillar of his regime, but as Boumédiène tightened his grip on power, most of the clan's members were gradually purged.

Still, a more generally defined "old guard", including some of the Oujda men, would continue to exercise influence after Boumédiène's death in 1978, over his successor Chadli Bendjedid. Bendjedid consciously strove to marginalise these men, and to replace them with his own loyalists. This policy became informally known as de-Boumédiènisation. The early 1980s therefore marked the end of whatever remained of the Oujda clan as a (somewhat) cohesive faction within Algerian politics, even if FLN "conservatives" favoring Boumédiène-style policies continued to challenge Chadli from within until they were finally purged following the October Riots in 1988.

In 1999, an old Oujda clan stalwart, the former foreign minister Abdelaziz Bouteflika (who, coincidentally, was born in Oujda), made an unexpected comeback, winning the Algerian presidential elections. He had been convicted for corruption in 1981, soon after Chadli's takeover, in what was viewed as one of the most important steps of de-Boumédiènisation, and in 1983 he had gone into exile. Bouteflika was reelected for a second term in 2004, and then, for a third term, in 2009 and a fourth term in 2014.

== See also ==
- History of Algeria
- Free Officers
