= David Harding =

David Harding may refer to:

- Dave Harding (born 1946), English footballer for Wrexham and Australian teams
- David Harding (financier) (born 1961), English mathematician and financier
- David Harding (artist) (1937–2026), Scottish sculptural artist
- David Harding, Counterspy, a 1950 film noir crime film
- David Harding (bowls), Welsh lawn and indoor bowler

== Similar names ==
- David Hardingham (born 1965), a British-based reform activist, aid organiser, entrepreneur
- David Harding Getches (1942–2011), was Dean and Professor of Natural Resources Law at the University of Colorado
