= India House (disambiguation) =

India House was an informal Indian nationalist organisation based in London between 1905 and 1910.

India House may also refer to:

- India House, London, the diplomatic mission of India in London, UK
- India House, Manchester, UK
- India House, Colombo, Sri Lanka
- India House, Penang, Malaysia
- 1 Hanover Square, also known as India House, in New York City, US
- Casa da Índia, a Portuguese colonial trade company

== See also ==
- East India House
