= Front Office Manager =

Front office manager may refer to:

- A management occupation within an organization or business—see front office
- MLB Front Office Manager, a sports-related video game

== See also ==
- Office management
