= Brian Cashman =

American baseball executive (born 1967)

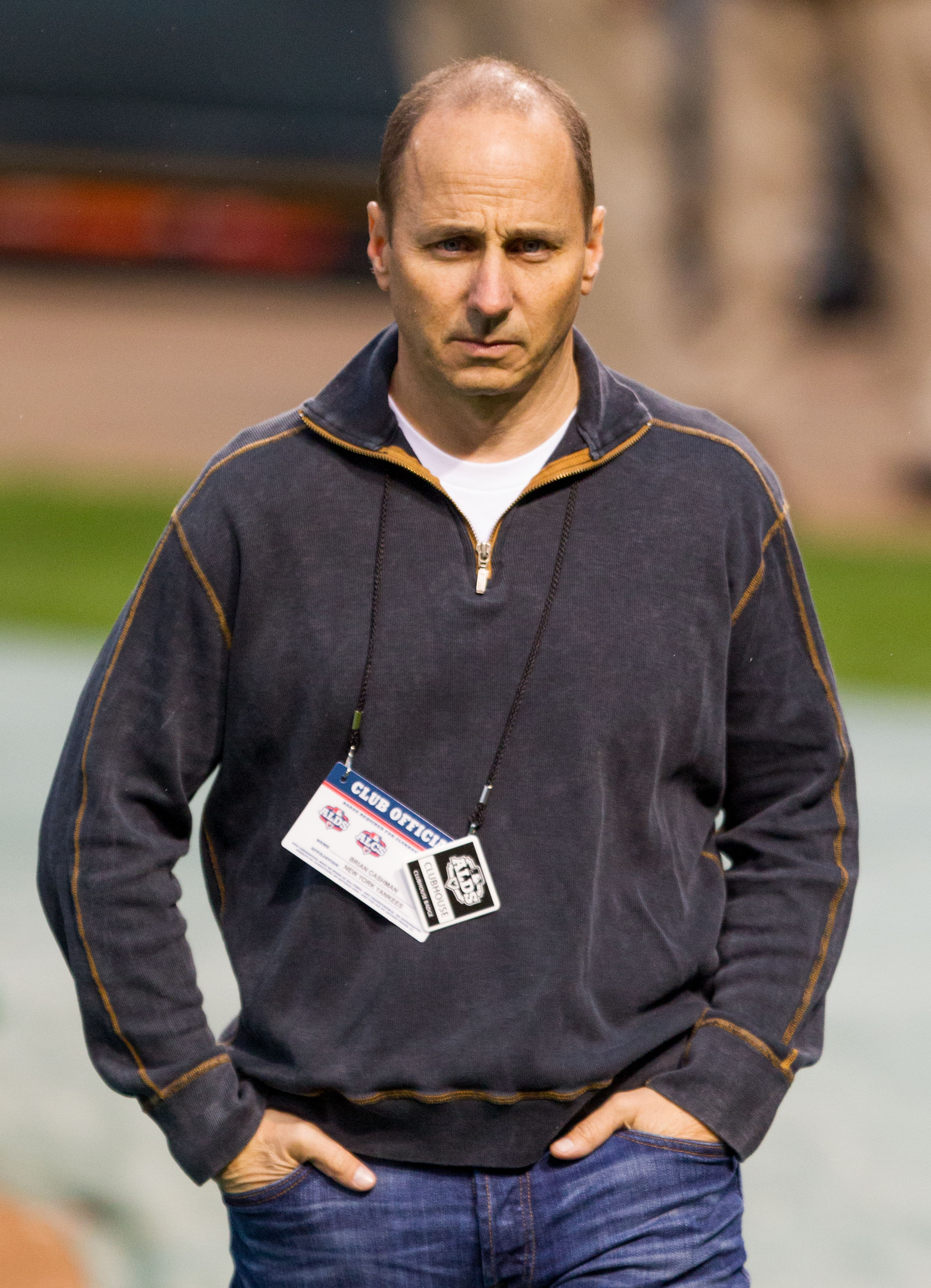
- Cashman in 2012

New York Yankees
- General manager / Senior vice president
- Born: July 3, 1967 (age 59); Rockville Centre, New York, U.S.

Teams
- New York Yankees (1986–present)

Career highlights and awards
- As general manager: 4× World Series champion (1998, 1999, 2000, 2009); As assistant general manager: World Series champion (1996)

Brian McGuire Cashman (born July 3, 1967) is an American baseball executive for the New York Yankees of Major League Baseball (MLB). He has served as the general manager and senior vice president of the Yankees since 1998. During Cashman's tenure as general manager, he inherited a core that was built by Gene Michael and Bob Watson, and the Yankees have won seven American League pennants and four World Series championships.

Cashman began working with the Yankees organization in 1986 as an intern while still in college. He was named assistant general manager in 1992, helping to run the team while owner George Steinbrenner was suspended from baseball. He succeeded Bob Watson as the team's general manager in 1998.

== Early life ==
Cashman was born in Rockville Centre, New York, and raised in Washingtonville, New York. He was raised in an Irish Catholic family, as the middle of five children born to Nancy and John Cashman. He became a baseball fan at a young age, attending a summer camp hosted by Bucky Dent before starting high school. He grew up as a fan of the Los Angeles Dodgers. While visiting his grandmother in Florida, he served as a batboy for the Dodgers during spring training in 1982, with the help of former Dodger Ralph Branca, a family friend.

The Cashman family moved to Lexington, Kentucky, where his father managed Castleton Farm, raising standardbreds for harness racing. Cashman described moving out of Washingtonville before starting high school as "the best thing to happen to [him], to get out of there."

Cashman attended Lexington Catholic High School before moving to the Washington, D.C., metropolitan area. He attended Georgetown Preparatory School in North Bethesda, Maryland, graduating in 1985. Cashman played baseball and junior varsity basketball at both schools, and added football in his senior year. Brian was classmates with Supreme Court Justice Neil Gorsuch and two years after future Supreme Court justice Brett Kavanaugh.

The Catholic University of America offered Cashman the opportunity to play college baseball for the Catholic Cardinals, competing in the National Collegiate Athletic Association's Division III, guaranteeing him playing time as a freshman. He was a four-year starter at second base and the team's leadoff hitter. He set a school record for most hits in a season, which has since been broken. He earned a bachelor's degree with a major in history in 1989.

== New York Yankees (1986–present) ==
George Steinbrenner, the owner of the New York Yankees, met John Cashman when he managed Pompano Park in Pompano Beach, Florida, and the two became friends. Through another family friend, John helped Brian obtain a position with the Yankees organization as an intern in 1986. He worked in the minor league scouting department in the day, and worked security at night. After Cashman graduated from Catholic, the Yankees offered him a position as a baseball operations assistant, which he accepted.

Steinbrenner was banned from baseball in July 1990 for hiring a gambler to investigate Dave Winfield. Gene Michael, then the Yankees' general manager, took over daily operations of the Yankees, and Cashman played a role in assisting him. He was promoted to assistant farm director that year, and to major league administrator in 1991. Michael named Cashman an assistant general manager in 1992. He remained in the role after Bob Watson succeeded Michael as general manager in 1995. The Yankees won the 1996 World Series.

=== General Manager (1998–present) ===
==== "Dynastic" years and success (1998–2005) ====
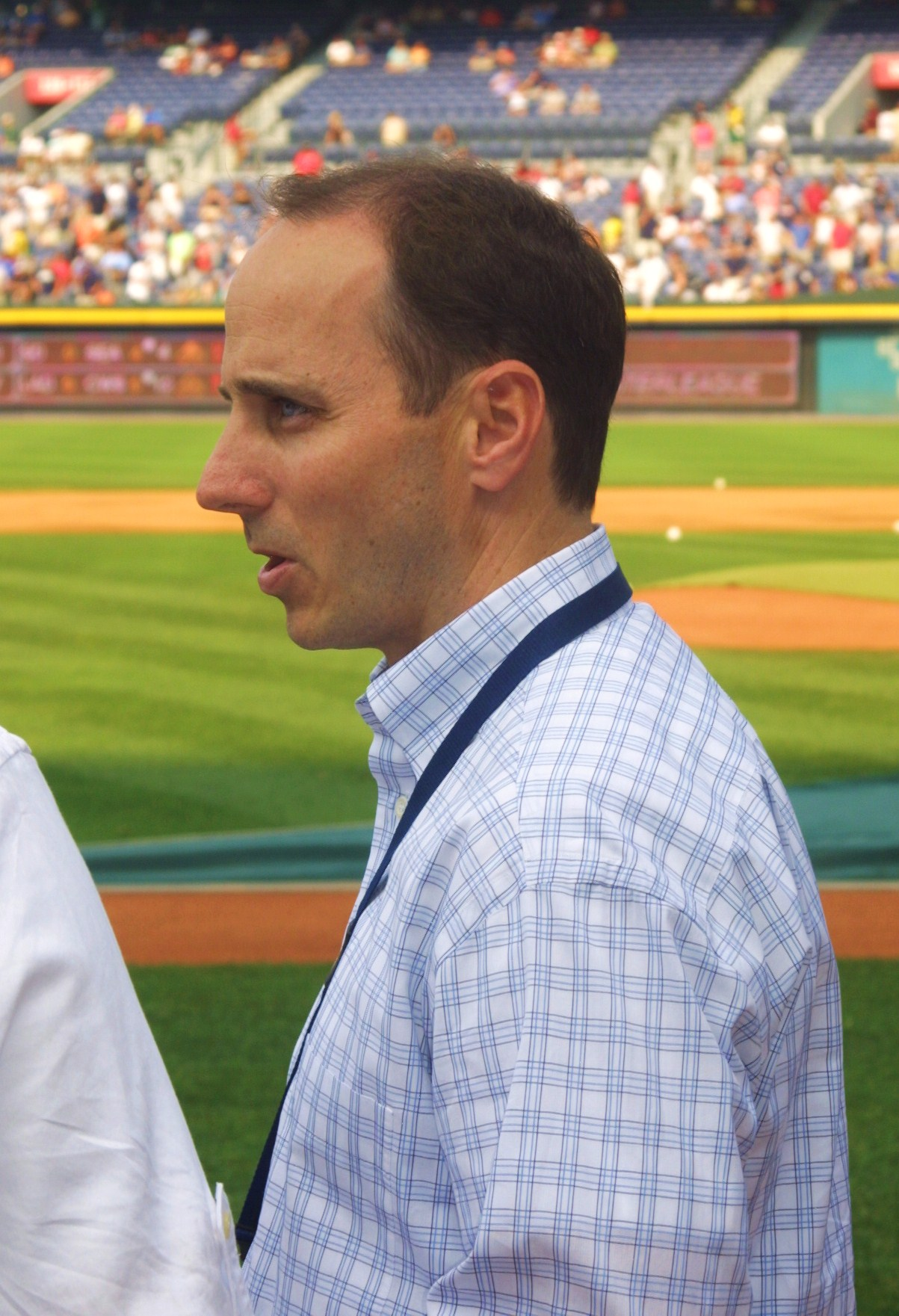
Cashman in 2009

In February 1998, Watson resigned from the Yankees, and Cashman was named senior vice-president and general manager. He agreed to a one-year contract for $300,000, and became the second-youngest general manager in MLB history. (Note: Randy Smith, who was 29 years old when hired to be the San Diego Padres' general manager in 1993, was the youngest.) The Yankees won 114 games during the 1998 season, and won the 1998 World Series. In 1999, Cashman traded fan favorite David Wells to the Toronto Blue Jays to acquire Roger Clemens. The next year, he acquired David Justice, who won the American League Championship Series (ALCS) Most Valuable Player Award for his play in the 2000 ALCS. The Yankees won the 2000 World Series, making Cashman the first general manager to win World Series titles in his first three years. In 2004, Cashman arranged the trade of Alfonso Soriano for Alex Rodriguez.

Despite the team's success, Cashman considered leaving the Yankees in 2005 due to conflicts with Steinbrenner and organizational disputes between team officials in New York City and Tampa, Florida. The Washington Nationals were rumored to be interested in hiring Cashman, which would have brought him back to the city where he attended school. Instead, Cashman agreed to a new contract with the Yankees following the conclusion of the 2005 season which gave him more authority in personnel decisions and paid him an average of $1.3 million more over the following three years.

==== Another championship (2006–2009) ====
With the increased authority, Cashman created a department of professional scouting, and tabbed Billy Eppler as its director. Later, Eppler would move on to become the general manager of the Los Angeles Angels of Anaheim. On September 30, 2008, Cashman signed a three-year contract to stay with the Yankees through the 2011 season. Following the 2008 season, when the Yankees failed to make the playoffs, Cashman signed CC Sabathia, A. J. Burnett, and Mark Teixeira to long-term free agent contracts and traded for Nick Swisher. These four players played a significant role in the 2009 Yankees season, culminating with a victory in the 2009 World Series.

==== Post-Championship years and struggles (2010–2016) ====
The Yankees went on to make the playoffs again following the 2010 season, but lost to the Texas Rangers in the 2010 American League Championship Series. Following the 2010 season, Cashman held a hard line with Derek Jeter during contract negotiations, reportedly telling Jeter that he would prefer to have Troy Tulowitzki as the Yankees' starting shortstop, though a deal was eventually made for three years and $45 million.

Yankees ownership agreed to sign Rafael Soriano in January 2011 without Cashman's approval. Cashman stated at Soriano's introductory press conference that he disagreed with the deal. The Yankees re-signed Cashman to a three-year contract in November 2011.

During 2013, Alex Rodriguez composed a tweet, saying that he had been cleared to play by his doctors after his hip surgery. Cashman was not pleased about the tweet, claiming that the doctors did not give such authority to clear Rodriguez to play after seeking a second opinion with them, causing his faith and relationship with Rodriguez to be alienated. Cashman also wanted to trade Robinson Canó during the 2013 season, reasoning that they would be unable to re-sign him in the next offseason. Ownership prevented Cashman from exploring a trade.

After the 2013 season, the Yankees signed Masahiro Tanaka, Jacoby Ellsbury, Brian McCann, and Carlos Beltrán to contracts that totaled $438 million. However, the Yankees missed the playoffs for the second consecutive year. On October 10, 2014, the Yankees signed Cashman to another three-year deal through the 2017 season. That offseason, Cashman prioritized restructuring the Yankees roster with younger players. He replaced the retired Jeter with Didi Gregorius and also acquired Nathan Eovaldi, both of whom improved during the season. In the 2016 season, he traded Carlos Beltrán to the Texas Rangers, Andrew Miller to the Cleveland Indians, and Aroldis Chapman to the eventual World Series Champion Chicago Cubs to bolster the Yankees farm system.

==== "Baby Bombers" Era (2017–present) ====
In 2017, the Yankees made the postseason with rookie outfielder Aaron Judge and second-year catcher Gary Sanchez. The Yankees defeated the Minnesota Twins in the 2017 American League Wild Card Game, and then went on to defeat the Cleveland Indians in the 2017 American League Division Series. Making their first appearance in the American League Championship Series since 2012, the Yankees lost to the Houston Astros in seven games, far outpacing the expectations of many analysts. Following the season, Cashman recommended to the owner Hal Steinbrenner that a managerial change was needed. Baseball America named Cashman their Executive of the Year after the season.

On December 9, Cashman traded second baseman Starlin Castro and two prospects for Marlins outfielder Giancarlo Stanton.

On December 11, 2017, Cashman signed a 5-year, $25 million contract with the Yankees to keep him as general manager through 2022.

The 2018 season saw Cashman and the Yankees win 100 games. Despite a lopsided victory in the AL Wildcard game over the A's, New York would fall to their rivals: Boston Red Sox in the Division Series. On April 7, 2019, Cashman won his 2,000th game as the Yankees general manager.

In the 2019 season, the Yankees won 103 games despite having over 30 players on the injured list during the season, with the players accounting over $81 million unable to play at one point of time.

During the pandemic-shortened 2020 season, the Yankees got off to an 8–1 start, and were 16-6 mid-August, before a seven-game losing streak. The team finished both August and September 14–13, which included a 1–7 stretch against the Baltimore Orioles, Toronto Blue Jays, Tampa Bay Rays, and New York Mets, before an 11–2 run, and finished the season 33–27, good for second-place in the East and a spot in the American League Wild Card Series, their 28th consecutive winning season. They won the series 2–0 against the Cleveland Indians, but lost the 2020 American League Division Series three-games-to-two against the Tampa Bay Rays.

In 2021, the Yankees rebounded to win 92 games, behind several winning streaks. Numerous player injuries in the first half of the season contributed to poor offense (through July, the Yankees had the second-lowest number of runs scored in the A.L.). Looking to bolster offensive production, Cashman traded for Anthony Rizzo and Joey Gallo, two strong left-handed batters. Between August 14–27, the team won 13 consecutive games, their longest such streak since 1961. They ended the season on an 8–1 run between September 20–30, but lost two of their final three games, before falling to the Red Sox 6–2 in the Wild Card Game.

The following year, the Yankees finished 99–63, winning the American League East, while star outfielder Aaron Judge broke Roger Maris's American League record by hitting 62 home runs. The Yankees defeated the Cleveland Guardians three games to two in the American League Division Series, but were swept by the Houston Astros in the American League Championship Series. During the season, Cashman surpassed Ed Barrow to become the longest-tenured general manager in Yankees history.

On December 5, 2022, the Yankees re-signed Cashman to a four-year contract to remain with the club through the 2026 season. Two days later, the Yankees and Cashman re-signed Aaron Judge to a 9-year, $360 million contract. After a 48–38 start, the 2023 season saw the team finish 82–80, their worst record since 1992, missing the playoffs with a fourth-place finish.

2024 saw the team capture the American League East title with a 94–68 record, and a 21–7 stretch in May alone. The Yankees defeated the Kansas City Royals in the ALDS and the Cleveland Guardians in the Championship Series, going 7–2 to reach their first World Series since 2009, but fell to the Dodgers in 5 games.

In 2025, the Yankees went 94–68 to finish second in the division, and beat the Red Sox 2 games to 1 in the Wild Card Series, before losing the 2025 American League Division Series to the eventual League Champion Toronto Blue Jays. On July 25 Cashman traded for Ryan McMahon to bolster the offense.

2026 saw the team finish 93–68 to again finish second in the East, but lost Aaron Judge for 99 days to a stint on the injured list, limiting him just 66 games, his lowest in a full season. The Yankees swept the Red Sox in the 2026 American League Wild Card Series, but were swept by the eventual American League Champion Tampa Bay Rays in the Division Series. On October 21, 2026, Cashman agreed to a new contract.

== Honors ==
Cashman was named to Crain's New York Business 40 under 40 list for 1999. The Boston chapter of the Baseball Writers' Association of America selected Cashman as their MLB Executive of the Year for 2009. In 2010, Cashman was inducted into the Irish American Baseball Hall of Fame.

Baseball America selected Cashman as its Executive of the Year in 2017.

Cashman was also involved in the developing of the video game MLB Front Office Manager.

== Personal life ==
Cashman has two children, Grace and Theodore, with his ex-wife Mary. Mary filed for divorce in February 2012; they had been reportedly separated for a year. The day prior, prosecutors charged a woman with stalking Cashman in an attempt to extort money regarding an extramarital affair. He is married to his second wife, Kimberley A. Brennan, and they reside in Greenwich, Connecticut. He is a Kentucky Wildcats and New Jersey Devils fan.

Cashman has referred to himself as an "adrenaline junkie." In December 2010, Cashman rappelled from a 350-foot (110 m) building in Stamford, Connecticut as part of an annual Stamford Christmas celebration. He jumped from an airplane with members of the United States Army Parachute Team to raise awareness for the Wounded Warrior Project and broke his right fibula and dislocated his right ankle in the process. In November 2014, Cashman slept on a New York City sidewalk to raise awareness on behalf of homeless youth.

== Notes ==
Sporting positions
Preceded by Bob Watson	New York Yankees General Manager; 1998–present	Succeeded by incumbent
