= Dead Rising 4 =

2016 video game

- Developer: Capcom Vancouver (Note: Additional work, development support, and co-developed by Microsoft Studios)
- Publisher: Microsoft Studios (Note: PlayStation 4 and Steam versions published by Capcom)
- Director: Joe Nickolls
- Producers: Eduardo Agostini; David McAnerin; Peter Sobczak
- Designer: Brent Arnst
- Programmer: Dee Jay Randall
- Artist: Geoff Coates
- Writers: Jeffrey Campbell; Shannon Campbell
- Composer: Oleksa Lozowchuk
- Series: Dead Rising
- Platforms: Windows; Xbox One; PlayStation 4
- Release: December 6, 2016: Windows, Xbox One December 6, 2016 Frank's Big Package Windows, PlayStation 4 December 5, 2017
- Genre: Action-adventure
- Modes: Single-player, multiplayer

Dead Rising 4 is a 2016 action-adventure game developed by Capcom Vancouver and published by Microsoft Studios. The game was released for Windows and Xbox One on December 6, 2016. It is the sequel to Dead Rising 3 and the fourth installment in the Dead Rising series. It features the return of Frank West, and is set in a rebuilt Willamette, Colorado during the Winter holiday season.

Dead Rising 4 received mixed reviews from critics, who praised the gameplay and the return of Frank West; however, a decline in overall quality and some technical problems were cited as negatives. A Windows version for Steam was released in March 2017, published by Capcom. A PlayStation 4 version of the game, titled Dead Rising 4: Frank's Big Package, was released on December 5, 2017.

== Gameplay ==
Dead Rising 4 is an action-adventure game with a goal to explore the environment and battle against hordes of the undead. Unlike its predecessors, the game does not feature a timer system or story co-op gameplay. As with the other games in the series, the game features an open world setting.

The controls were designed to be more streamlined, with separate buttons for shooting and melee attacks. Any item can be picked up and used as a weapon, some being more efficient than others. Frank can level up with an experience system named Prestige Points (PP). Taking photographs from Dead Rising returns, with an added selfie and night vision mode. The camera is also used for finding clues during the missions.

Each region has a number of safe houses that must be free of zombies in order to unlock missions nearby. The safe houses can be leveled up by completing side missions, which in turn gives more stuff to buy. The zombies are not the only enemies in the game, because Frank will also face soldiers carrying rifles and shotguns.

== Plot ==
In September 2021, Frank West, a former photojournalist now working as a college professor, is approached by one of his students, Vicky "Vick" Chu, who convinces him to help her investigate a military compound, situated on the outskirts of Willamette, Colorado — the site of the second zombie outbreak. Once inside, they find out the compound is being used for zombie research, but are discovered and forced to flee, with Frank labelled a fugitive after he is falsely accused by the government.

Four months later in 2022, after Christmas, Frank is found by Brad Park, an agent of the ZDC, who convinces him to help investigate a new zombie outbreak in Willamette during the Black Friday sales, in exchange for the means to clear his name and having exclusive rights to the story, revealing Vick has already left to investigate the matter herself.

Just as they arrive at Willamette, Frank and Brad's helicopter is hit by a missile, forcing them to make a crash landing in the middle of the shopping mall. Upon confronting the zombies, they are discovered to be infected with a new, more aggressive strain of the parasite that previous treatments like Zombrex are ineffective against. Frank eventually discovers an elusive organization called "Obscuris" is in the city looking for a monstrous creature called "Calder", and reunites with Vick on a few occasions, but their opposing views prevent them from working together.

Frank manages to approach an Obscuris truck carrying Calder, but it drives off, leaving him to confront an Obscuris lieutenant. Upon investigating the laboratory of Dr. Russell Barnaby, the main scientist behind the zombie outbreak in Santa Cabeza, Central America, Frank learns that during his last days, Barnaby was developing ways to make zombies with their human intelligence intact before Carlito lured him to the Willamette Parkview Mall, resulting in his death. Calder was once a human Obscuris soldier enhanced with a military exoskeleton transformed by accident into an intelligent but violently psychotic zombie-like mutant, who downloaded Barnaby's data on a disk he always carries on his person. Frank finds himself having to confront Calder in order to retrieve it.

Frank later invades the base of Obscuris and faces the leader of the organization, Fontana - and the one responsible for bringing down the helicopter carrying him and Brad. Fontana reveals their group was not responsible for the outbreak. Instead they were hired by an unknown client to obtain Calder's data, seeking to use the research on intelligent zombies to make cheap labor for factories and plantations in developing countries. Their confrontation is interrupted by Calder, who kills Fontana. After rescuing several survivors from a group of psychotic survivalists, Frank pursues Calder down to the sewers, where he steals the disk and transfers the data to his camera. Vick appears with a gun, forces Frank to give her his camera, and flees after destroying the disk. Frank runs after her all the way to the shopping mall where they are intercepted by Calder, who destroys the camera, and the two work together to kill him.

After the battle, Vick reveals to Frank she took the camera's SD card, containing all of the disk's data, and they reconcile, agreeing to share the credit for the story. Frank, Vick and Brad leave for the rooftop to be extracted via helicopter, but a massive horde of zombies pursue them on the way there. Brad and Vick make it to the helicopter, but Frank is grabbed as he is boarding and, unable to break free from their grip, sacrifices himself so Vick and Brad can escape.

=== Frank Rising ===
In this downloadable content released in April 2017, Frank, after falling from the helicopter, is half eaten by the zombies, but suddenly after all the zombies have gone away, the experimental wasps infect Frank, converting him into an evo zombie. This gives him new abilities like acid spit, pouncing, and roaring. After gaining all these new abilities, Frank begins eating humans as well as zombies. In the Willamette Mall, Frank is shot and taken to Barnaby's lab where he is given control of his body back, but loses all of his powers. Dr. Blackburne, the Obscuris scientist who treats Frank, tells him that the military plans to firebomb Willamette. The only way to survive is to get on the evacuation helicopter which would arrive shortly.

Blackburne also tells Frank he could regain all his powers by absorbing the wasps present in evo zombies. Frank asks about a cure, which Blackburne agrees to help him with if he gathers supplies for her. Blackburne later double-crosses Frank, but he threatens her into continuing to cooperate. Blackburne explains she needs to get into Barnaby's lab but cannot due to high levels of radiation. Frank is eventually successfully cured back to a human and is able to escape with Blackburne in the evacuation helicopter.

If Frank does not collect all special wasps during the game, Frank escapes alone with Blackburne and retires from journalism, spending the rest of life in fear of becoming a zombie again. If he does, Hammond and her team escape with them and Frank becomes famous again, writing a book about his experience as a zombie that becomes a bestseller, and exposes the government's involvement with Obscuris with Vick's help. If the player runs out of time during 'The Cases', the story ends in a failed rescue due to bombardment commanded by the United States Government to prevent the zombie outbreak from spreading throughout the state.

== Development ==
In 2014, Dead Rising 4 was originally conceived as a reboot of the Dead Rising series, which was being developed at Capcom Vancouver in partnership with Microsoft. The game, codenamed Climber, was intended to be an Xbox One exclusive that was inspired by The Last of Us. This original version of the game was scrapped by Capcom Japan in Summer 2014, leading to the project being rebooted with Frank West as the main character.

In January 2016, Capcom Vancouver announced it was working on two new open world projects. Dead Rising 4 was announced at the Microsoft E3 2016 conference with a trailer and 12 minutes of gameplay.

Terence J. Rotolo did not return to voice Frank West, who was instead portrayed by Ty Olsson (credited in-game as Victor Nosslo). Dead Rising asset manager Trant Lee-Aimes stated, "We wanted to work with someone to provide a more grizzled, older take on Frank at this stage." This change proved controversial among some fans, leading them to petition the developer to restore Rotolo as West.

== Release ==
The game was released worldwide on December 6, 2016. Microsoft also confirmed the game is a timed-exclusive on Windows 10 for 90 days and a year on Xbox One. On February 22, 2017, Capcom announced that Dead Rising 4 would be released for Steam on March 14. The PlayStation 4 version, titled Dead Rising 4: Frank's Big Package, was released on December 5, 2017.

On January 30, 2017, a free downloadable update was released introducing two harder difficulty modes, Hard and Blackest Friday (in which enemies do more damage, weapons break faster, and food heals less), and five other in-game Super Street Fighter II Turbo costumes alongside Ryu and Akuma, such as the attires of Guile, M. Bison, Zangief, Cammy, and T. Hawk. On January 31, a timed demo released on Xbox One allowing players to experience both the single-player and multiplayer of Dead Rising 4 for one hour, and enables players to carry across their progress to the full game. An update released on December 5 adding a new game mode called Capcom Heroes, which allows Frank to don 17 new outfits based on Capcom's video game franchises, each with their own moveset.

== Reception ==
Reception

Aggregate score
Aggregator	Score
Metacritic	(PC) 74/100 (PS4) 72/100 (XONE) 72/100

Review scores
Publication	Score
Destructoid	7.5/10
Electronic Gaming Monthly	7.5/10
Game Informer	8.75/10
GameRevolution	2.5/5
GameSpot	7/10
GamesRadar+	4/5
IGN	8.1/10
The Jimquisition	8/10

Dead Rising 4 received "mixed or average" reviews from critics, according to review aggregator website Metacritic.

IGN's Brandin Tyrrel liked the new Frank West and the game's take on Christmas consumerism, as well as the "detailed presentation and careful consideration that went into both the world and the story." Tyrrel felt Capcom had balanced the absurdity of the gameplay with intelligence and feeling, but specifically found the safehouses too simple and underwhelming, writing he "would've loved to see some sort of shelter defense system come into play." Game Informer's Jeff Cork similarly praised the gameplay, writing that Capcom Vancouver "infused the series with fresh ideas and some of the best action that it's had in a decade." Cork felt the storyline was a little rote, and was disappointed with the new and original but bland and generic "maniacs" (which serve as the game's bosses and replace the previous games' psychopaths) and lack of campaign co-op, but praised the new gameplay features such as the camera enhancements and the exo-suit, as well as the improvements to the map compared to Dead Rising 3's map. Conversely, GamesRadar+'s Sam Prell wrote the "majority of Willamette is a sleepy, uninspiring blur", and felt the story lacked a satisfying final boss and too many objectives were repetitive. He acknowledged some players might not like the changes to Frank West's appearance and voice but wrote "he has the same smartass-with-a-heart-of-gold personality he's always had" and "is still worth cheering on." Prell felt the removal of the timer present in previous games was a "fantastic improvement" and wrote that together with the simplification of the game's bosses and save points, Dead Rising 4 was a "more casual, easygoing entry than its older siblings", but ultimately believed it succeeds more than it fails.

Writing a less positive review, Destructoid's Chris Carter wrote that while he liked the game's comic book-like animations and campy tone, it felt like there "was a concerted amount of effort put into it". He disliked the new Frank West, who reminded him of a less-interesting Ash Williams, and he "straight up [did] not like that the timer is gone in the main mode". He felt the lack of story co-op and specific save points were understandable, but the removal of the timer system removed the tension, and felt it was "a sleazy move" that Capcom Vancouver were going to bring back the timer in the upcoming Dead Rising 4: Frank Rising paid DLC. Writing for GameSpot, Scott Butterworth felt that "[f]or a game that's all about mindless zombie murder, the storytelling is remarkably adept", and Frank and Vick's relationship was nuanced and believable. Butterworth believed "Dead Rising's juxtaposition of slaughter and silliness makes for a memorable world", and summarized his review by writing that despite the series' zombie-slaughtering formula wearing a bit thin after all these years, the "surprisingly well-crafted story, [...] new combo weapons, and expansive open world elements [...] turn Dead Rising 4 into an over-the-top piece of popcorn entertainment that captures the series' best elements." James Stephanie Sterling favorably compared the goofiness of the gameplay to the Saints Row series. They recognized and sympathized with long-time Dead Rising players who were put off by the changes Dead Rising 4 made, such as the removal of the timer system, the replacement of Frank West's voice actor and his new appearance, and the more comedic tone of the game, but could not help but find it "a damn fine, damn fun, damn funny game though."

=== Sales ===
By April 2017, Dead Rising 4 had sold less than a million units, short of Capcom's expectation of two million. As of September 30, 2024, the original Windows and Xbox One version had sold 1.60 million units.

=== Accolades ===
Year	Award	Category	Result	Ref.
2017	2017 National Academy of Video Game Trade Reviewers Awards	Song Collection	Nominated	
2017	15th Annual Game Audio Network Guild Awards	Best Original Vocal Song - Pop ("Oh Willamette")	Nominated	
2017	Golden Joystick Awards 2017	Xbox Game of the Year	Nominated	
2018	2018 National Academy of Video Game Trade Reviewers Awards	Sound Effects (Frank's Big Package)	Nominated	

== Cancelled sequel ==
A sequel to the game, titled Dead Rising 5, was in development at Capcom Vancouver for Windows and Xbox One. The game was set between Dead Rising 2 and Dead Rising 3, and would have followed the adventures of Chuck and Katey Greene in Mexico. The project was canceled when Capcom Vancouver shut down in September 2018.

Development footage from the game was leaked in February 2023. The game was reportedly in development for about a year after Dead Rising 4's release. Bloody Disgusting reported the game's working title was Dead Rising 5: Dia de los Muertos.
