= Francis Light Memorial =

Memorial in George Town, Penang, Malaysia

Coordinates: 5°25′12.1″N 100°20′21.5″E

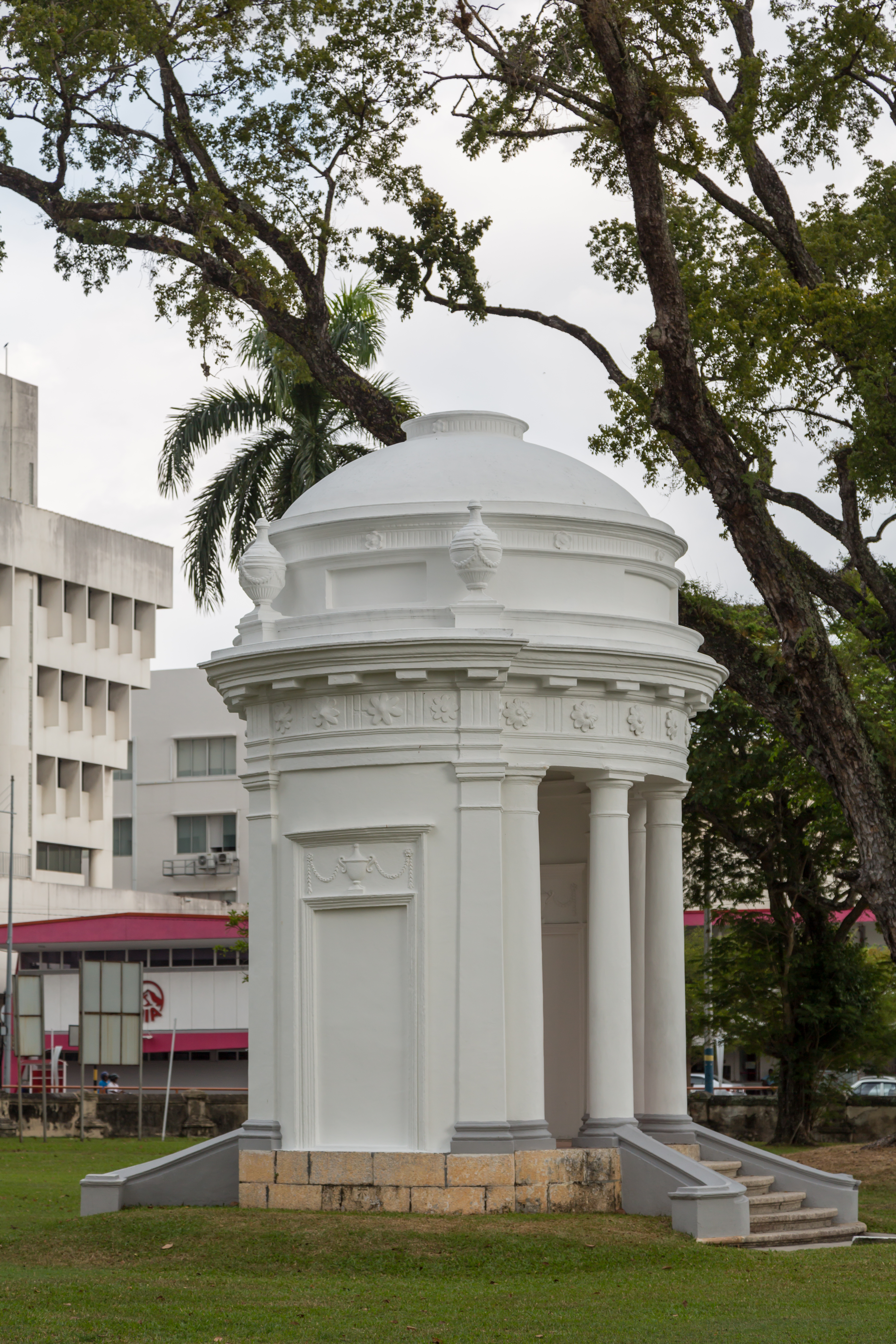
- Interactive map of the Francis Light Memorial area

General information
- Type: memorial
- Location: George Town, Penang, Malaysia
- Opening: 1840s

The Francis Light Memorial is a memorial about Francis Light in George Town, Penang, Malaysia. The memorial, located underneath the dome, reads: "In memory of Francis Light ESQ who first established this island as an English settlement and was many years governor. Born in the county of Suffolk in England and died October 21st, 1794. In his capacity as governor, the settlers and natives were greatly attached to him and by his death had to deplore the loss of one who watched over their interests and cares as a father."

== History ==
The memorial was erected some time in the early 1840s by Robert Scott. There are erroneous claims that it was built in 1886, ostensibly to coincide with the 100th anniversary of the founding of George Town; however, the memorial was already depicted in a pen and wash drawing by John Turnbull Thomson in 1848 (Thomson died in 1884).

== Architecture ==
The memorial was built with a mixture of Georgian architecture and Palladian architecture style with a dome in front of St. George's Church, located at Farquhar Street, George Town. The top of the dome is ornamented with vases and underneath the dome is a marble plaque honoring Light.

== See also ==
- List of tourist attractions in Penang
