= Capcom Vancouver =

Canadian video game developer

- Formerly: Blue Castle Games Inc. (2005–2010)
- Type: Subsidiary
- Industry: Video games
- Founded: July 4, 2004; 22 years ago
- Founder: Robert Barrett
- Defunct: September 18, 2018; 8 years ago
- Fate: Dissolved
- Headquarters: Burnaby, British Columbia, Canada
- Key people: Tim Bennison (COO); Bryce Cochrane (creative director); Chris Rowe (executive producer)
- Products: Dead Rising series
- Number of employees: 200 (2018)
- Parent: Capcom (2010–2018); Microsoft Studios (minority stake, 2010–2018)
- Website: www.capcomvancouver.com

Capcom Game Studio Vancouver, Inc. (formerly Blue Castle Games Inc.), more commonly known as Capcom Vancouver, was a Canadian video game developer owned by Capcom with minority stake partnership by Microsoft Studios. As Blue Castle Games, the company was the creator of several successful baseball sports video games, including The Bigs, MLB Front Office Manager and The Bigs 2. They have also developed the Dead Rising series. Blue Castle Games was acquired by Capcom after the release of Dead Rising 2, and renamed Capcom Vancouver, where they continued to work on the Dead Rising series. Capcom announced the closure of the studio in September 2018, cancelling Dead Rising 5 and moving other development to their Japan-based studios.

== History ==
Blue Castle Games logo

The company was formed on July 4, 2004 in Burnaby, British Columbia, Canada by three core founders with thirty five years of combined video game experience. Starting with only twelve staff and one game (The Bigs), the company grew to 200 people with 3 shipped titles. In February 2008, Blue Castle Games won the award for Best New Video Game Company at the 2008 Elan Awards for The Bigs, in a tie with another local Vancouver company. A wide number of developers in Capcom Vancouver were formerly of EA Vancouver, located only a couple blocks away from their studio. Yoshinori Ono was the studio director from 2011 to 2014.

In February 2018, Capcom had laid off about 30% of the studio, but had continued to use Capcom Vancouver to support Puzzle Fighter on mobile and ongoing work for Dead Rising games. On September 18, 2018, Capcom announced the closure of the studio on reviewing the state of development of current projects. While a skeleton crew remained through January 2019 to complete certain projects, remaining development work was either cancelled or transitioned to Capcom's Japan studios. Capcom estimated the cost of the cancelled projects equated to about ¥4.5 billion (approximately US$40 million).

== Games developed ==
=== As Blue Castle Games ===
Year	Game	Platform(s)	Publisher
2007	The Bigs	PlayStation 2, PlayStation 3, PlayStation Portable, Wii, Xbox 360	2K Sports
2007	Major League Baseball 2K8	PlayStation 3, Xbox 360	2K Sports
2009	MLB Front Office Manager	Microsoft Windows, PlayStation 3, Xbox 360	2K Sports
2009	The Bigs 2	Nintendo DS, PlayStation 2, PlayStation 3, PlayStation Portable, Wii, Xbox 360	2K Sports
2010	Dead Rising 2: Case Zero (Note: Additional work, development support, and co-developed by Capcom)	Xbox 360	Capcom
2010	Dead Rising 2	Microsoft Windows, PlayStation 3, Xbox 360	Capcom
2010	Dead Rising 2: Case West	Xbox 360	Capcom

=== As Capcom Vancouver ===
Year	Game	Platform(s)	Publisher
2011	Dead Rising 2: Off the Record	Microsoft Windows, PlayStation 3, Xbox 360	Capcom
2013	Dead Rising 3 (Note: Additional work, development support, and co-developed by Microsoft Studios)	Microsoft Windows, Xbox One	Microsoft Studios/Capcom
2014	Dead Rising Collection	Xbox 360	Microsoft Studios/Capcom
2016	Dead Rising 4	Microsoft Windows, Xbox One	Microsoft Studios/Capcom
2017	Puzzle Fighter	iOS, Android	Capcom
2017	Dead Rising 4: Frank's Big Package	PlayStation 4	Capcom

=== Cancelled games ===
- Knights of Aegis (2017)
- Dead Rising 5 (2018)

== See also ==
- Capcom
- List of Capcom subsidiaries
