= Phom =

Phom may refer to:

- Phom people, a tribe of Nagaland, north-east India
- Phom language, the Sino-Tibetan language spoken by them
- PhoM, or Mass Communication Specialist, an occupational rating in the US Navy
- Penang House of Music, a gallery in George Town, Penang, Malaysia
