= The Bigs =

2007 video game

- North American Wii cover art featuring Albert Pujols
- Developer: Blue Castle Games
- Publisher: 2K
- Platforms: Xbox 360, PlayStation 3, PlayStation 2, Wii, PlayStation Portable
- Release: NA: June 25, 2007; PAL: October 26, 2007 (Wii)
- Genres: Sports, baseball
- Modes: Single-player, multiplayer

The Bigs (stylized as The BIGS) is an arcade-style baseball video game for the Xbox 360, PlayStation 3, PlayStation 2, Wii and PlayStation Portable. It was released in June 2007 in North America, and in October in the PAL region (Wii only). A sequel, The Bigs 2, was released on July 7, 2009.

== Gameplay ==
The Bigs features "outrageous visuals and intuitive gameplay mechanics", focusing on stylistic rather than realistic design, and gameplay featuring power-ups and turbo. It has also given the game of baseball a more "street" feel to it. The game features online play capability for up to four players on most of the seventh generation consoles, though online play is not compatible on the Wii. The St. Louis Cardinals' first baseman, Albert Pujols, is on the cover. Minnesota Twins first baseman and former MVP Justin Morneau was featured on the cover of a limited edition Canadian version sold exclusively by Future Shop and Best Buy. Radio host Damon Bruce provides play-by-play commentary.

When the first trailer was released, gameplay bore a striking resemblance to Midway Games' MLB Slugfest series, but in an IGN interview, producer Dan Brady stated that "the Slugfest design team made a lot of choices that really made it difficult for a fan of baseball to take the game seriously. Punching on the base path was just one of many of those decisions. The Bigs is authentic baseball taken to arcade proportions".

== Game modes ==
- Rookie Challenge: The user designs a custom player, assigns him to an MLB team and guides him through spring training and the MLB season. Attribute points to improve the player are rewarded for offensive prowess and the completion of various mini-games that test the player's skill in a variety of areas. The player can also steal 10 players from opposing teams after defeating them in certain games.
- Home Run Pinball: This mode puts the player in the middle of Times Square, New York City with the objective of hitting baseballs into neon signs and windows in order score the highest points possible. The player can then upload their score to the online leader boards and see where they rank.
- Home Run Derby: A first-to-10 showdown between two hitters.

=== Multiplayer ===
Offline multiplayer supports up to four players, with Xbox Live support for two.

== Reception ==
Reception

Aggregate score
| Aggregator | Score | | | | |
| Aggregator | PS2 | PS3 | PSP | Wii | Xbox 360 |
|---|---|---|---|---|---|
| Metacritic | 71/100 | 77/100 | 72/100 | 66/100 | 79/100 |

Review scores
| Publication | Score | | | | |
| Publication | PS2 | PS3 | PSP | Wii | Xbox 360 |
|---|---|---|---|---|---|
| 1Up.com | N/A | A− | A− | C | A− |
| Electronic Gaming Monthly | N/A | 8.17/10 | N/A | N/A | 8.17/10 |
| Game Informer | N/A | 7.5/10 | N/A | N/A | 7.5/10 |
| GameSpot | 7.5/10 | 8/10 | 8/10 | 7/10 | 8/10 |
| GameSpy | N/A | 4/5 | 3.5/5 | 3/5 | 4/5 |
| GameZone | N/A | 8/10 | 7/10 | 7.1/10 | N/A |
| IGN | 7/10 | 8/10 | 6.3/10 | 7/10 | 8.3/10 |
| Nintendo Power | N/A | N/A | N/A | 6/10 | N/A |
| Official Xbox Magazine (US) | N/A | N/A | N/A | N/A | 7.5/10 |
| PlayStation: The Official Magazine | N/A | 6.5/10 | N/A | N/A | N/A |
| 411Mania | N/A | N/A | N/A | 8/10 | N/A |
| The A.V. Club | N/A | N/A | N/A | N/A | A− |

The PlayStation 3 and Xbox 360 versions received "generally favorable reviews", while the PlayStation 2, PSP, and Wii versions received "average" reviews, according to the review aggregation website Metacritic.
