= Friends of Maldives =

Friends of Maldives (FOM) is a UK-based voluntary association and activist organisation promoting human rights reform and assisting development in the Maldives.

FOM was formed in December 2003 following the violent death of Evan Naseem on 19 September 2003 in Maafushi Prison, Maldives and the subsequent unrest in prisons which resulted in twenty people being shot and three killed. The initial aim of FOM was to increase awareness of human rights abuses in the Maldives as a means of building support for long-awaited reforms. FOM worked closely with leading human rights NGOs, media, government bodies and international institutions to ensure a greater awareness of the former government's human rights abuses.

FOM was founded by David Hardingham. Sarah Mahir acted as the FOM coordinator from 2005 to 2008.

Following implementation of human rights reforms after the first free and fair Presidential elections in the Maldives, FOM now works to find and assist UK volunteers to work in the Maldives on specific education, health and development projects.

== FOM history 2003-2008 ==
The initial focus was on working with NGOs (Amnesty International, Article 19, Reporters Without Borders), the United Nations, political bodies (EU and British parliaments, Foreign Affairs departments, Embassies in Colombo accredited to the Maldives).

FOM reported on severe restrictions on freedom of expression, persecution of journalists, arbitrary arrests and torture, in addition to regular reports on political prisoners.

Public demonstrations were organised in Europe at trade fairs. There were confrontations with former President Maumoon Abdul Gayoom in London and Geneva.

FOM travelled to Washington, Brussels and Geneva - bringing the Maldives Human Rights issues to the desks of international human rights NGOs.

FOM regularly assisted investigative journalists travelling to the Maldives by providing contacts and support in the Maldives.

The FOM selected Resort Boycott Campaign called for the boycott of resorts in the Maldives that were directly associated with the regime while encouraging visiting those not on the list. This was seen as a new and pragmatic way to highlight pressure on the regime while not adversely affecting the entire economy.

FOM staff met regularly with the UK Conservative Party Human Rights Commission and engaged their help to monitor the political and human rights situation in the Maldives closely. Members of the Commission tabled several Parliamentary Questions and Early Day Motions.

Assisted in finding support from International Media Support (IMS) for media training in the Maldives (early 2007) and financial assistance and support for Minivan Radio. IMS participated in the International Press Freedom Mission in May 2007.

== Hill and Knowlton goes to the Maldives ==
FOM were critical of the engagement of the international PR firm Hill and Knowlton by the dictatorship as a means to clean up its image while hindering real reform. On 15 February 2007 FOM held a demonstration outside the offices of Hill and Knowlton in Soho Square, London, to protest about the ‘whitewashing’ of Gayoom's dictatorship.

FOM argued that there had been few real democratic reforms since Hill and Knowlton began the contract with the Government of Maldives. Tim Fallon, a former adviser to then British Prime Minister Tony Blair, was head of corporate affairs at Hill & Knowlton and managed the Maldives account

== Christian missionary and Islamic extremist accusations ==
FOM founder David Hardingham was barred from entering the Maldives during the period 2005–2008 following accusations by the former regime that he was part of an Islamic extremist plot to smuggle weapons into the Maldives. The former regime also accused FOM of being a Christian missionary organisation with links to the Maldivian Democratic Party (MDP). A forged letter distributed around the Maldives purporting to be from Hardingham to Mohamed Nasheed, on a Salisbury Cathedral letterhead, described how Hardingham was planning to build a replica of Salisbury Cathedral in the Maldives.

== Current activities ==
FOM now works to find and assist UK volunteers to work on specific development projects in the Maldives. The main areas covered are in the fields of Education, Health and Sport.

FOM works with the Maldives High Commission in London and related Government agencies to source, assist and follow up on volunteer activities throughout the Maldives, with a special focus on areas furthers away from the capital Male’.

Friends of Maldives Sports Coordinator and Olympic Olympic rower Guin Batten successfully rowed across the Zero Degree Channel (Addoo Kandu) in the Maldives on 30 March 2010. Her objectives were to raise the profile of rowing in the Maldives, revive the sport of rowing and to support the Women's Rowing Centre on the Gaafu Dhaalu Atoll.
