= David Hardingham =

British activist

- Born: 1965 (age 60–61); South Africa
- Occupation: British-based reform activist
- Known for: Founder of Friends of Maldives (FOM); Honorary Consul for the Maldives in Salisbury (UK)

David Hardingham (born 1965) is a British-based reform activist, aid organiser, entrepreneur and the former Honorary Consul of the Maldives (Nasheed Administration) in Salisbury (UK).

He is also co-founder and director of the London based human rights organisation chinawatch.co.uk (CW) where they monitor the rule of law and human rights in China. In January 2024 Hardingham addressed a meeting organised by The Overseas Chinese Democracy Coalition titled The European Preparatory Meeting for the National Affairs Conference, on behalf of China Watch, held at the Royal National Hotel in London.

== Early years ==
Hardingham was born in South Africa, where his early studies were in Hilton College. The family later moved to the UK in 1982, where Hardingham continued his education at Dauntsey's School, an independent co-educational boarding school in Wiltshire, UK.

== Career ==
He was founder of the human rights activist organisation Friends of Maldives (FOM). He was also the co-founder of the clandestine opposition radio station Minivan Radio and trustee of the UK registered charity Maldives Aid. He was appointed the Honorary Consul for the Maldives in Salisbury (UK) on 2 July 2009.

Hardingham was closely involved with the movement for political reform in the Maldives as a result of his friendship with then opposition activist Mohamed Nasheed (Anni), and former President of the Maldives, whom he met while both of them were at Dauntsey's School.

He was an outspoken critic of former President Maumoon Abdul Gayoom's human rights record during his thirty-year presidency, a record he maintains is confirmed by the many examples of torture undergone by Mohamed Nasheed and many others he had met during the time many opposition activists stayed at Salisbury.

Owing to his criticism of the former regime, Hardingham was officially barred from entering the Maldives between 2005 and 2008. During this time, he was accused by the then-government of being both a Christian fundamentalist trying to convert Maldivians and an Islamic extremist involved in a plot to smuggle weapons into the Maldives. Further accusations were made that he and Mohamed Nasheed were conspiring to build a replica of Salisbury Cathedral in the Maldives. Hardingham has visited the Maldives several times since the change of government, but he has, to date, not been officially informed of his status. Neither has he received any further information regarding the allegations.

Along with Sarah Mahir and other FOM associates Hardingham confronted Gayoom in the Palais des Nations in Geneva on 16 May 2005. Hardingham asked him why he had been blacklisted from the Maldives and about human rights abuses in the Maldives. There was no response from Gayoom.

Following the FOM Selected Resorts Boycott campaign Hardingham was accused of trying to bring about a collapse of the Maldives tourism industry, a charge he strongly denies as he has always argued that the idea of the selected boycott was to apply the restrictions only to those resorts associated closely with the regime while strongly encouraging visits to other resorts and to the Maldives.

Hardingham and Sarah Mahir of FOM met regularly with the UK Conservative Party Human Rights Commission and engaged their help to closely monitor the political and human rights situation in the Maldives. Members of the Commission tabled several Parliamentary Questions and Early Day Motions regarding human rights abuses in the Maldives.

He was UK crossing coordinator and liaison during Guin Batten's successful rowing crossing of the Zero Degree Channel on 30 March 2010 (between Huvadhoo Atoll and Foammulah Island), a distance of approximately 60 km (37 mi).

The Consulate in Salisbury was officially inaugurated at an opening ceremony on 9 July 2010, attended by the Maldives High Commissioner Dr Farah Faizal and local MP for Salisbury John Glen.

Hardingham has promoted guesthouse tourism in the Maldives saying that, at a time of growing competition from other luxury destinations, the growth of guesthouse tourism in the Maldives would bring more direct economic benefit to the islanders.

In 2010 Hardingham and FOM colleagues were involved in bringing skilled volunteers, teachers and medics, to the Maldives from the UK.

Hardingham resigned from his post as Honorary Consul to the Maldives during the coup that led to the overthrow of President Nasheed.
