= The Bigs 2 =

2009 video game

- North American cover art for the Xbox 360
- Developer: Blue Castle Games
- Publisher: 2K Sports
- Platforms: PlayStation 2; PlayStation 3; PlayStation Portable; Wii; Xbox 360; Nintendo DS
- Release: NA: July 7, 2009; PAL: July 17, 2009 (X360); PAL: August 28, 2009 (Wii); Nintendo DS: NA: August 25, 2009
- Genre: Sports
- Modes: Single-player, multiplayer

The Bigs 2 (known in Europe and Australia as The Bigs 2 Baseball) is a baseball sports video game developed by Blue Castle Games and published by 2K for the Xbox 360, PlayStation 3, PlayStation 2, Wii, and PlayStation Portable. The game serves as the direct sequel to The Bigs. The first trailer for the game revealed players like Ozzie Smith, Wade Boggs, Roberto Clemente, and Reggie Jackson and a number of other Hall of Famers. Milwaukee Brewers All-Star first baseman Prince Fielder is the cover athlete chosen by 2K Sports. For the Xbox 360, PlayStation 3 and Wii editions of the game, the English play-by-play announcer is Damon Bruce while the Japanese announcer is Kasey Ryne Mazak. It was released in 2009.

== Gameplay ==
The BIGS 2 features an over-the-top playing style, like the first game established. Unlike the first game, The BIGS 2 allows players to play through the full 162 game season and will allow the player to act both as general manager and as the players on the field by allowing the player to trade, draft, and manage other front office activities. The game also includes new game stats called Power, Glove, and Contact. It does not support the Wii MotionPlus for improving control precision.

At bat, the game also gives the player a new hitting system that consists of a "wheelhouse". Pitches thrown into the wheelhouse can be hit more efficiently by the batter or gain more turbo if taken for a strike. Strikes in the wheelhouse also shrink the radius of the wheelhouse. For some hitters, the circle will be bigger based on stats. For example, Alex Rodriguez possesses very high hitting stats. His wheelhouse radius covers nearly the entire strike zone, excluding the four corners.

The game also include real-time sequences where the player can quickly tap a button to catch a ball speeding quickly past a fielder's head. Like the original game, each button simply like (X) will stand for a different base. When the button is pressed, the ball would be thrown to the selected base.

The new "Big Slam" mechanic allows the player to bring four consecutive batters up. If the first batter makes contact a single will automatically register. This will continue until the 4th batter is reached. If the first three players reached base by making contact, the 4th batter, upon making contact, will automatically hit a grand slam.

Become a Legend is a mode where the player creates a character who is recovering from an injury in the Mexican League, is picked up by a Major League team, and then tries to reach "Legendary Status".

== Reception ==
Reception

Aggregate score
Aggregator	Score					
Aggregator	DS	PS2	PS3	PSP	Wii	Xbox 360
Metacritic	35/100	62/100	80/100	67/100	68/100	76/100

Review scores
Publication	Score					
Publication	DS	PS2	PS3	PSP	Wii	Xbox 360
1Up.com	N/A	N/A	B−	C+	N/A	B−
Game Informer	N/A	N/A	7/10	N/A	N/A	7/10
GamePro	N/A	N/A	N/A	N/A	N/A	4/5
GameSpot	N/A	N/A	8/10	7.5/10	N/A	8/10
GameTrailers	N/A	N/A	N/A	N/A	N/A	7.7/10
GameZone	N/A	N/A	N/A	N/A	N/A	6.9/10
IGN	4/10	5.8/10	8/10	6/10	6.3/10	8/10
Nintendo Power	N/A	N/A	N/A	N/A	6/10	N/A
Official Xbox Magazine (US)	N/A	N/A	N/A	N/A	N/A	7/10
PlayStation: The Official Magazine	N/A	N/A	4/5	N/A	N/A	N/A
The A.V. Club	N/A	N/A	N/A	N/A	N/A	B
Teletext GameCentral	N/A	N/A	N/A	N/A	N/A	7/10

The PlayStation 3 and Xbox 360 versions received "generally favorable reviews", and the PlayStation 2, PSP, and Wii versions received "mixed or average reviews", while the DS version received "generally unfavorable reviews", according to the review aggregation website Metacritic.
