= St. George's Church, Penang =

St. George's Church
- Malay: Gereja St. George
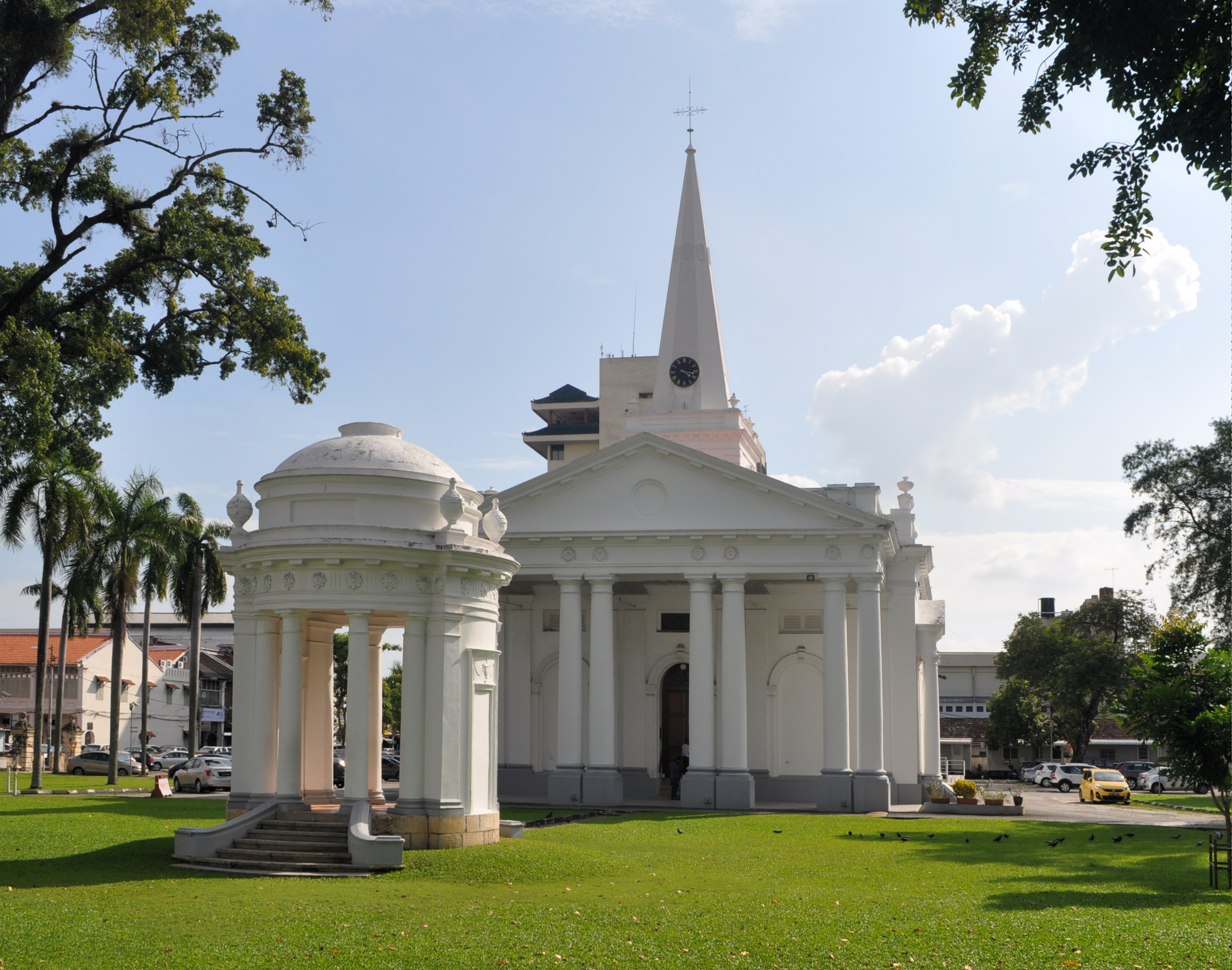

- Location within George Town
- 5°25′11.0″N 100°20′20.8″E
- Location: Farquhar Street; George Town, Penang
- Country: Malaysia
- Denomination: Anglican

History
- Founded: 1818
- Consecrated: 1819

Architecture
- Functional status: Active
- Heritage designation: National Heritage Register
- Designated: 1996
- Architect(s): William Petrie, Robert N. Smith
- Architectural type: Neo-Classical and Georgian Palladian
- Groundbreaking: 1816
- Completed: 1818
- Construction cost: 60,000 Spanish dollars

Administration
- District: Penang
- Province: Church of the Province of South East Asia
- Diocese: Diocese of West Malaysia
- Archdeaconry: Upper North Archdeaconry

Clergy
- Bishop: Rt Rev Dr Stephen Soe Chee Cheng
- Vicar: Rt Rev Gerrad Emmanuel

UNESCO World Heritage Site
- Type: Cultural
- Criteria: ii, iii, iv
- Designated: 2008 (32nd session)
- Part of: George Town UNESCO Core Zone
- Reference no.: 1223
- Region: Asia-Pacific

St. George's Church is a 19th-century Anglican church within George Town in the Malaysian state of Penang. The oldest purpose-built Anglican church in Southeast Asia, it was elevated by to the status of pro-cathedral in 2023. The church lies within the jurisdiction of the Upper North Archedeaconry of the Anglican Diocese of West Malaysia.

== History ==
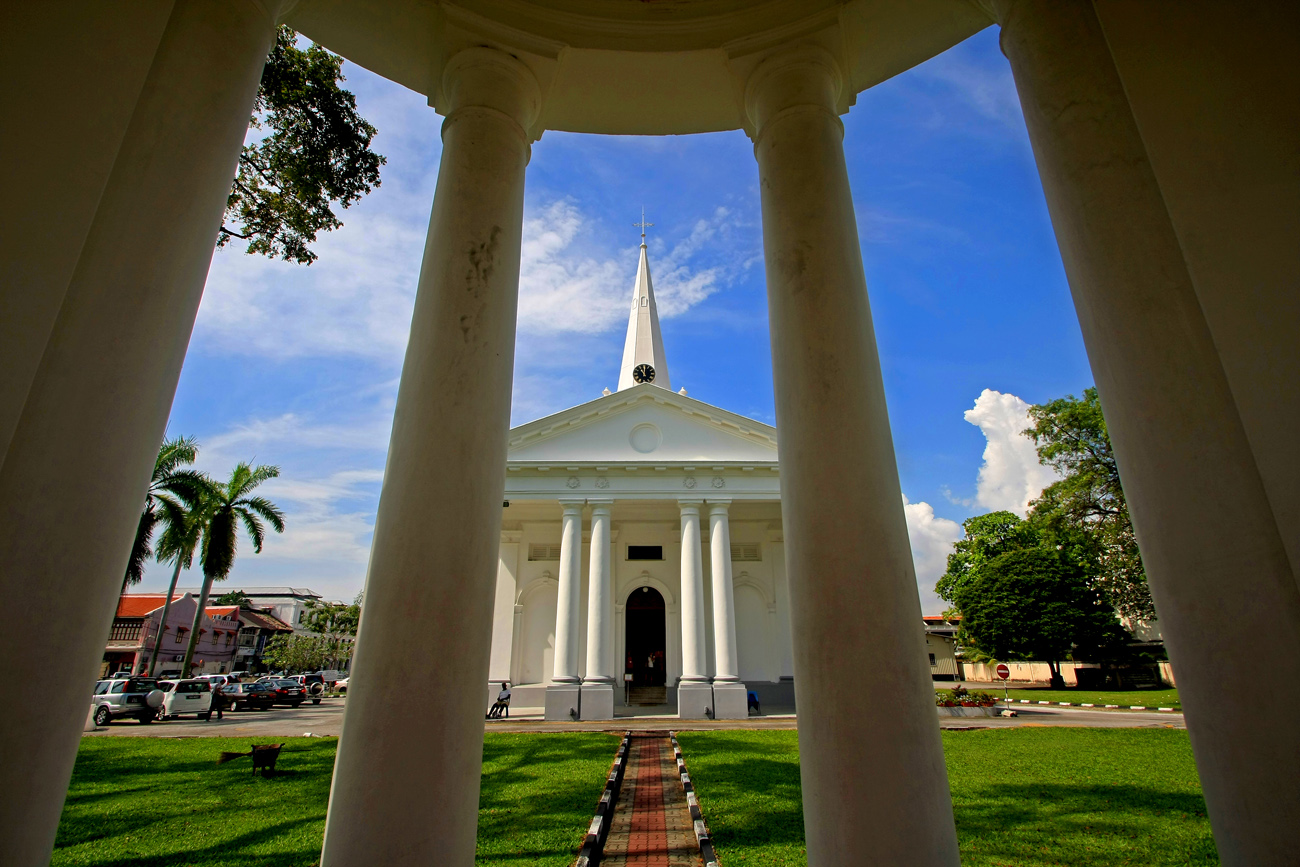
St George's Church (built in 1816) is the oldest Anglican church in South East Asia.

After the British East India Company took possession of the island of Penang in 1786, the spiritual care of the colonists was effected by Church of England chaplains attached to the EIC. Early religious services were held at the chapel of Fort Cornwallis and later at the Court House located opposite the present church building.

Proposals for the building of a permanent church were submitted as early as 1810 but was only acted upon after the passing of the East India Company Act 1813 (Charter Act) whereby the EIC received a 20-year extension of its charter. Approval was obtained in 1815 to build the church based on the architectural plans drawn up by Major Thomas Anburey but the church was eventually built on the plans drawn up by the Governor of Prince of Wales Island (as Penang was known then), William Petrie, and modified by Lieutenant Robert N. Smith of the Madras Engineers. Smith was a colleague of Colonel James Lillyman Caldwell, the chief architect of St. George's Cathedral in Madras, and the architecture of St. George's Church is believed to be based on the cathedral itself.

Amongst those consulted on the building of the church was the Rev. Robert Sparke Hutchings, the Colonial Chaplain of Prince of Wales Island. Hutchings would later be instrumental in setting up the Penang Free School. The building was completed in 1818 while Hutchings was still away in Bengal and church services were officiated by a Rev. Henderson. The church was consecrated on 11 May 1819 by the Bishop of Calcutta, Thomas Fanshawe Middleton.

The first significant event that took place in the church after its completion was the wedding of the Governor, William Edward Philips to Janet Bannerman, the daughter of his predecessor, Colonel John Alexander Bannerman on 30 June 1818.

The building was significantly damaged during the Japanese occupation of Malaya and a lot of her interior fittings were looted. Services were not to be held in the church until repairs concluded in 1948. Currently Bishop Dr Stephen Soe Chee Cheng is the Suffragan Bishop of the Area Diocese of Northern Peninsula with the Diocese of West Malaysia: Vicar of St. George’s Church Penang, the Oldest Anglican Church in South East Asia.

== Architecture ==
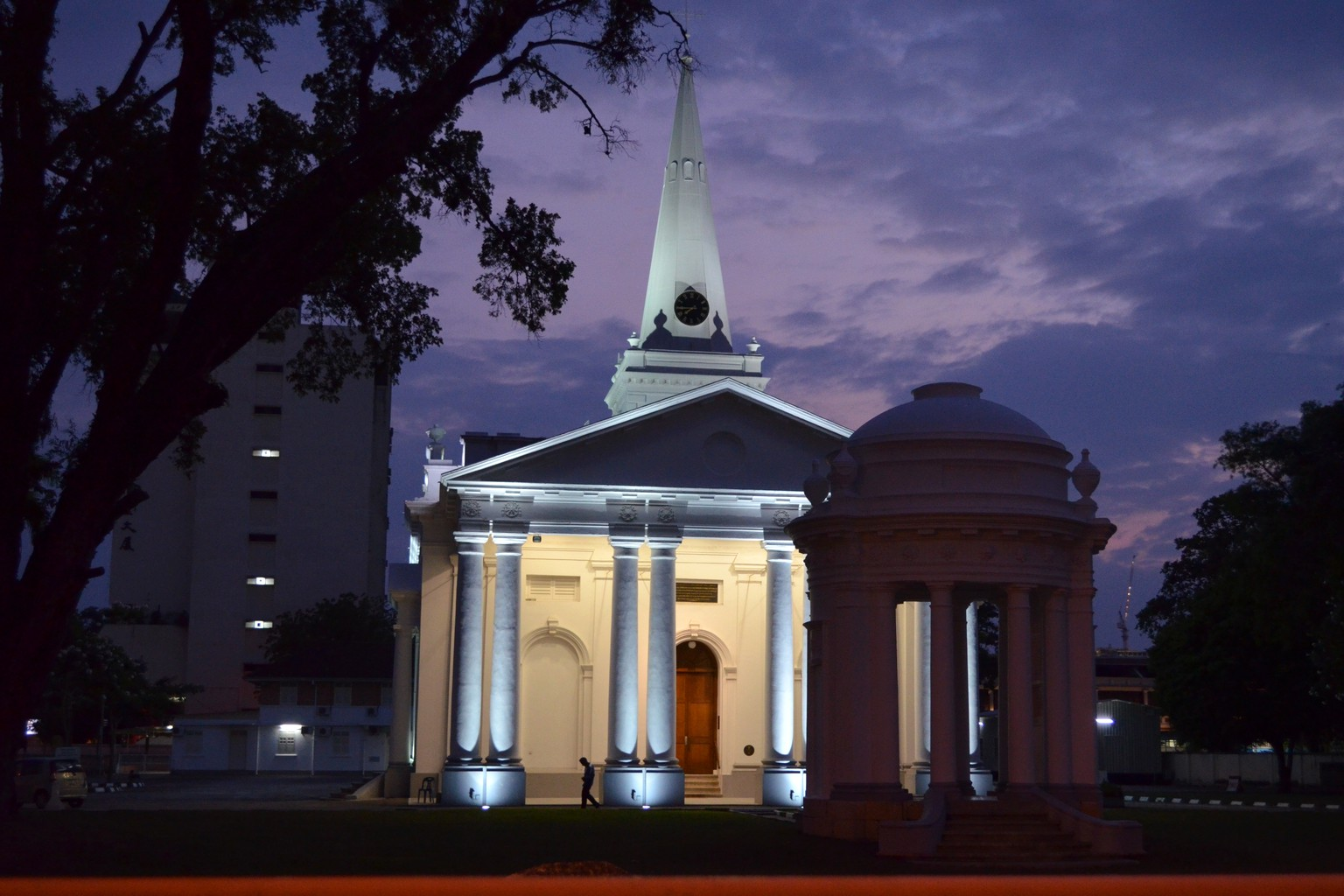
St George's Church at night

The church is built with a combination of Neo-Classical, Georgian and English Palladian architecture styles. Built entirely by Indian convict labour, it was built of brick on a solid plastered stone base.

The Church features a portico of Doric columns. The original roof was flat but was converted to a gable in 1864 as the original flat roof was found to be unsuitable in the tropical climate. The apex of the roof is topped by an octagonal shaped steeple.

A memorial pavilion was erected in 1886 in memory of Captain Francis Light during the Centenary Celebrations of the founding of modern Penang.

In 2007, the church was declared one of the 50 National Treasures of Malaysia by the Malaysian federal government. It underwent a major restoration in 2009.

== See also ==
- Christianity in Malaysia
