= MLB Front Office Manager =

2009 video game

- Developer: Blue Castle Games
- Publisher: 2K
- Platforms: Microsoft Windows, PlayStation 3, Xbox 360
- Release: NA: January 27, 2009
- Genre: Sports management
- Modes: Single-player, Multiplayer

MLB Front Office Manager is a Major League Baseball-licensed sports management game developed by Blue Castle Games and published by 2K for Microsoft Windows, Xbox 360 and PlayStation 3. It was released on January 26, 2009.

== Gameplay ==
Batter-pitcher interface.

MLB Front Office Manager allows a player to take the role of a baseball general manager over the course of a thirty-year career; the goal is to perform well enough to become inducted into the Baseball Hall of Fame. The player's GM is rated on eight disciplines including North American scouting, international scouting, pro-league scouting, player development, trades, contract negotiation, owner confidence and leadership. GMs also have former career backgrounds (e.g. ex-manager, lawyer, business person, former player, or talent scout) that affect the GM's disciplines. A GM's ratings improve or regress over his career depending on their performance. A GM will also have seasonal goals depending on the club they're hired by. The player will be faced with decisions such as spring training evaluation, initiate and respond to trades, develop rookies, and even bid for Japanese baseball players. The game also promises advanced AI-controlled GMs who have unique motivations.

During the game, the player may opt to manage, and can issue instructions such as intentionally walk batters, make a bullpen changes, call for steals and bunts, and pitch; the user cannot call individual pitches.

The game features a full 3D engine for single game gameplay. Full nine inning games take roughly 10–15 minutes to play.

=== Statistical depth ===
The game features a full 3D engine for play resolution.

The game utilizes official SABR stats compiled over the player's career, even factoring such situational stats as batter vs. pitcher historical stats, pitcher's performance at specific pitch counts, and success with runners in scoring position, in addition to the usual situational stats. These stats extend to actual minor league players from Class AAA to A-Short Season minor league systems; due to MLBPA agreements, the players are not identified by name. Players also have personality ratings as well.

=== Multiplayer ===
The game features Online Fantasy Mode, which allows up to thirty managers in an online league to compete against one other to develop the best team. Gamers can use modified rules, enter a fantasy draft, and optionally utilize fantasy baseball scoring systems like rotisserie, head-to-head or traditional scoring.

== Development ==
Oakland Athletics general manager Billy Beane served as expert consultant on the GM experience and environment. Beane also appears in-game as an advisor to the player. New York Yankees general manager Brian Cashman was also involved in the project.

== Reception ==
Reception

Aggregate score
| Aggregator | Score | | |
| Aggregator | PC | PS3 | Xbox 360 |
|---|---|---|---|
| Metacritic | 45/100 | 49/100 | 47/100 |

Review scores
| Publication | Score | | |
| Publication | PC | PS3 | Xbox 360 |
|---|---|---|---|
| Game Informer | 3/10 | 3/10 | 3/10 |
| GameSpot | 4.5/10 | 4.5/10 | 4.5/10 |
| GamesRadar+ | N/A | 2.5/5 | 2.5/5 |
| GameZone | N/A | 7.5/10 | 6.8/10 |
| IGN | 6.6/10 | 6.6/10 | 6.6/10 |
| PlayStation Official Magazine – UK | N/A | 4/10 | N/A |
| Official Xbox Magazine (US) | N/A | N/A | 5/10 |
| PlayStation: The Official Magazine | N/A | 3/5 | N/A |
| TeamXbox | N/A | N/A | 5.2/10 |
| 411Mania | N/A | 5.8/10 | 5.7/10 |

MLB Front Office Manager received "generally unfavorable reviews" on all platforms according to the review aggregation website Metacritic. Game Informer said, "The nuts and bolts of gameplay are apocalyptic failures, but the awfulness doesn't stop there. Managing games is utterly pointless." GameSpot noted "the decisions made by computer GMs are beyond bizarre" and player trades "are nondescript affairs shuffling minor leaguers around, [but] the game hits you with a Bizarro World blockbuster on a regular basis." Hilary Goldstein's IGN review was more charitable, but still complained, "Lack of three-team deals, a mediocre interface, and questionable AI logic are unacceptable even from a new IP."

== See also ==
- Baseball Mogul
- Out of the Park Baseball
