= Free Officers Movement =

Free Officers Movement can mean:

- Free Officers Movement (Egypt) in Egypt who overthrew the Muhammad Ali Dynasty in the Egyptian Revolution, to form the Republic of Egypt.
- Free Officers Movement (Iraq) in Iraq who overthrew the Hashemite Dynasty in the 14 July Revolution, to form the Republic of Iraq.
- Free Officers and Civilians Movement in Iraq who campaigned against Saddam Hussein's rule in the 1991 Iraqi uprisings, to form the Coalition Provisional Authority.
- Free Officers Movement (Syria) in Syria who fought against Bashar al-Assad's rule in the Syrian Civil War in 2011, to form the Free Syrian Army.
- Free Officers Movement (Libya) in Libya who overthrew the Senussi Dynasty in the Libyan Revolution, to form the Libyan Arab Republic.
