= Penang House of Music =

Music gallery in Penang, Malaysia

Penang House of Music (PHoM)
- Rumah Muzik Pulau Pinang
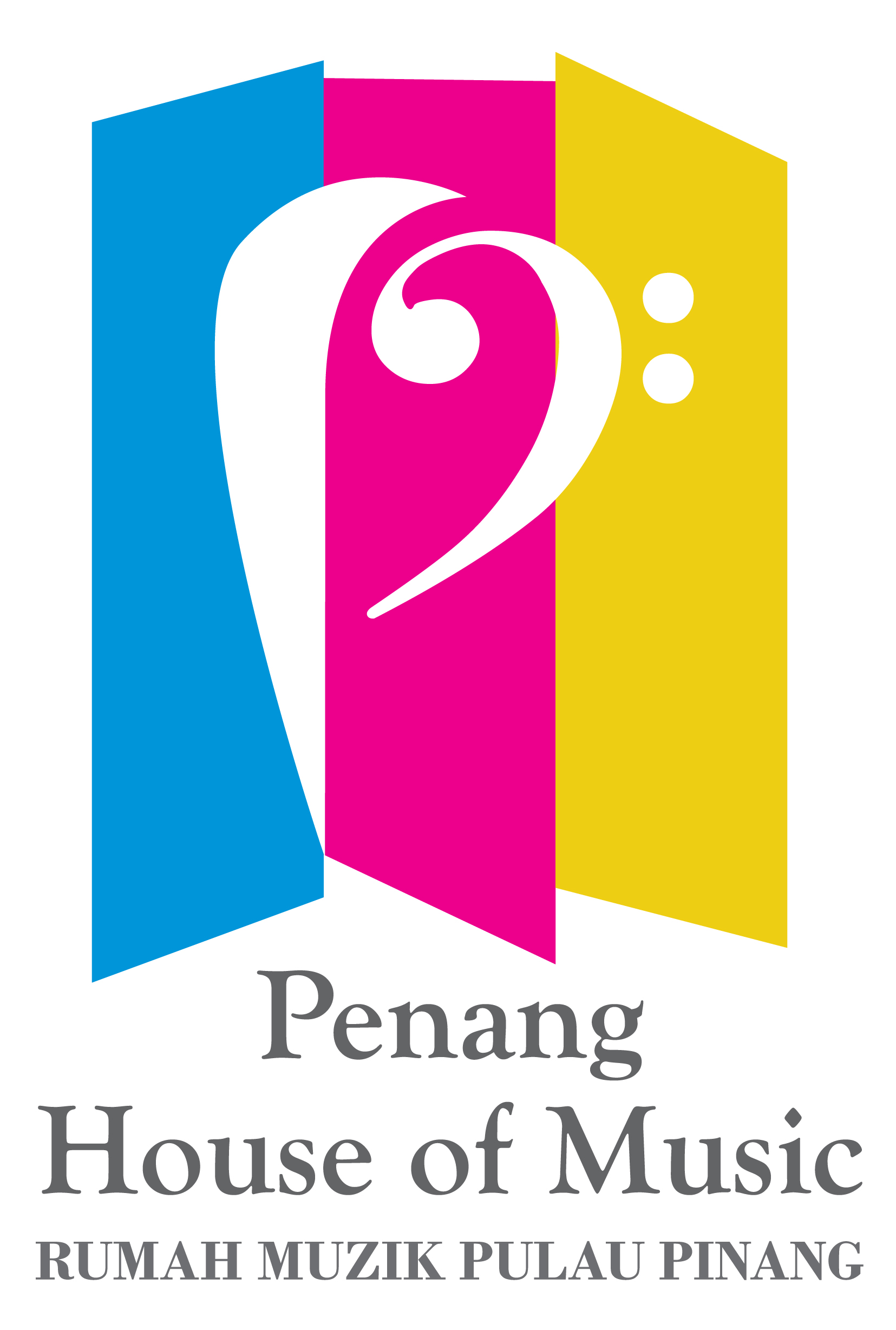
- Established: 21 November 2016
- Location: ICT Digital Mall, Penang Road, George Town, Penang, Malaysia
- Coordinates: 5.414°N 100.331°E
- Director: Paul Augustin
- Website: www.penanghouseofmusic.com

The Penang House of Music (PHoM) is an interactive music gallery in George Town, Malaysia. It consists of a gallery, a performing/exhibition space, and a resource centre that documents Malaysia's musical heritage with a focus on Penang's music and musicians. It is located on the 4th floor of the ICT Digital Mall, Penang and covers 650 square metres. The gallery has earned a reputation as a kinaesthetic learning experience of music, culture, arts and social studies and its resource centre houses one of the largest collections of Malaysia's music, culture and performing arts. Here, various audio visual materials relating to Malaysia's music and history is documented, catalogued and digitised.

== Background ==
The Penang House of Music was established on 21 November 2016, as part of the Penang Musical Heritage Project in line with the Penang state government's goal of creating a city dedicated to heritage and creative arts. It received funding from Penang Water Supply Corporation and support from the Penang Chief Minister's Office.

The information displayed in the gallery was derived from research materials compiled by The Capricorn Connection for exhibitions on Penang's popular music at the Penang State Museum in 2010 and 2013. These exhibitions later evolved into the publication of a book titled Just For The Love Of It; Popular Music in Penang 1930s-1960s in 2015, co-authored by James Lochhead and Paul Augustin. The book documents Penang's popular music scene from the 1930s to the 1960s.

== Gallery ==
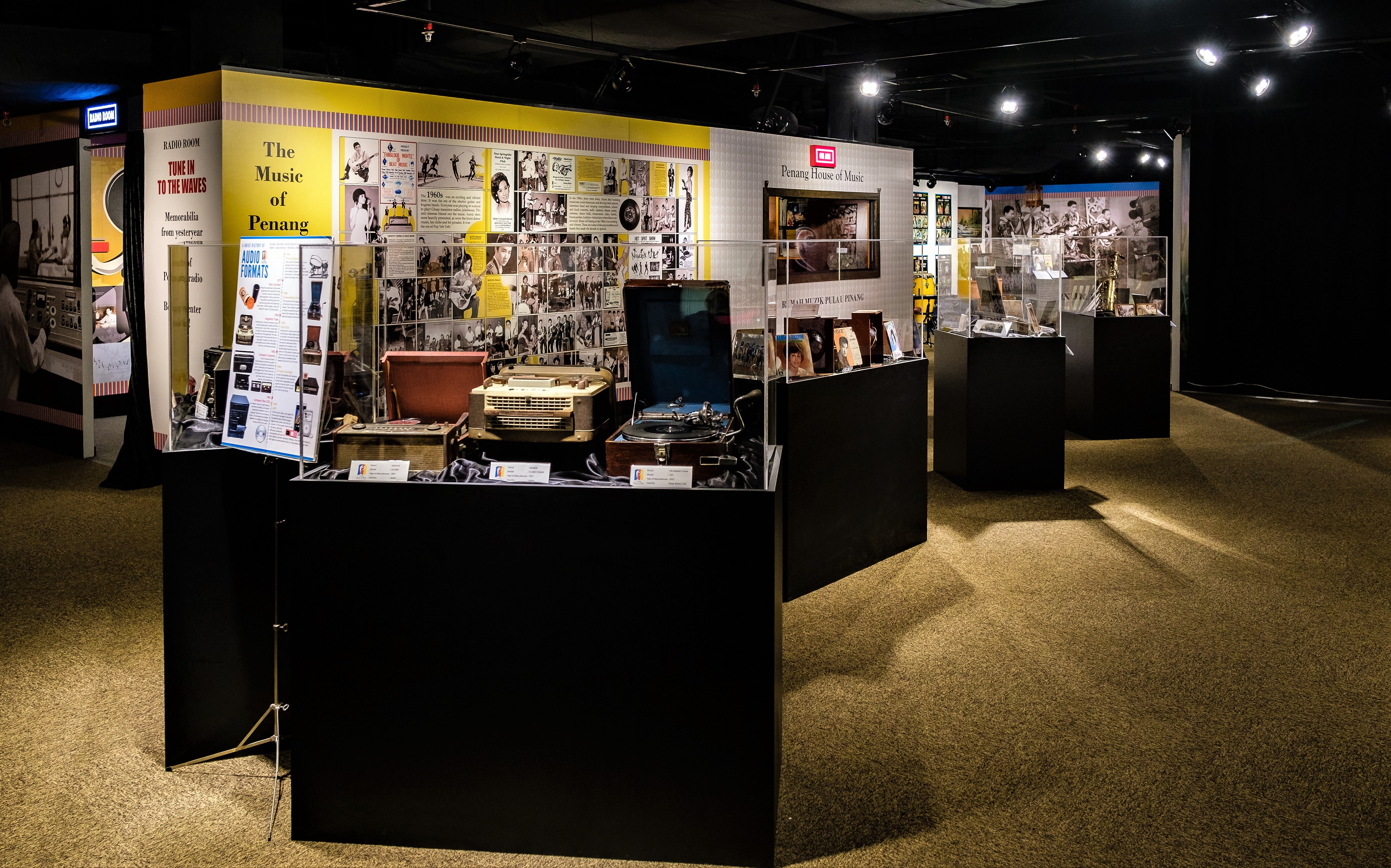
A section of PHoM's gallery

PHoM's gallery highlights the traditional music of Penang's communities in the time period between the 1930s to the 1970s, and features exhibitions on various musicians who have shaped the music of Penang and Malaysia. It is divided into several sections that explain the development of various local genres of music such as bangsawan, boria, ronggeng, dondang sayang and the musicians of the period.

Interactive features include a motion sensor Potehi allowing puppets to be manipulated on screen, a listening chair and listening dome that plays a choice of popular music from the era, virtual and augmented reality, a broadcasting booth, a cinema room and local and traditional instruments.

== Black Box ==
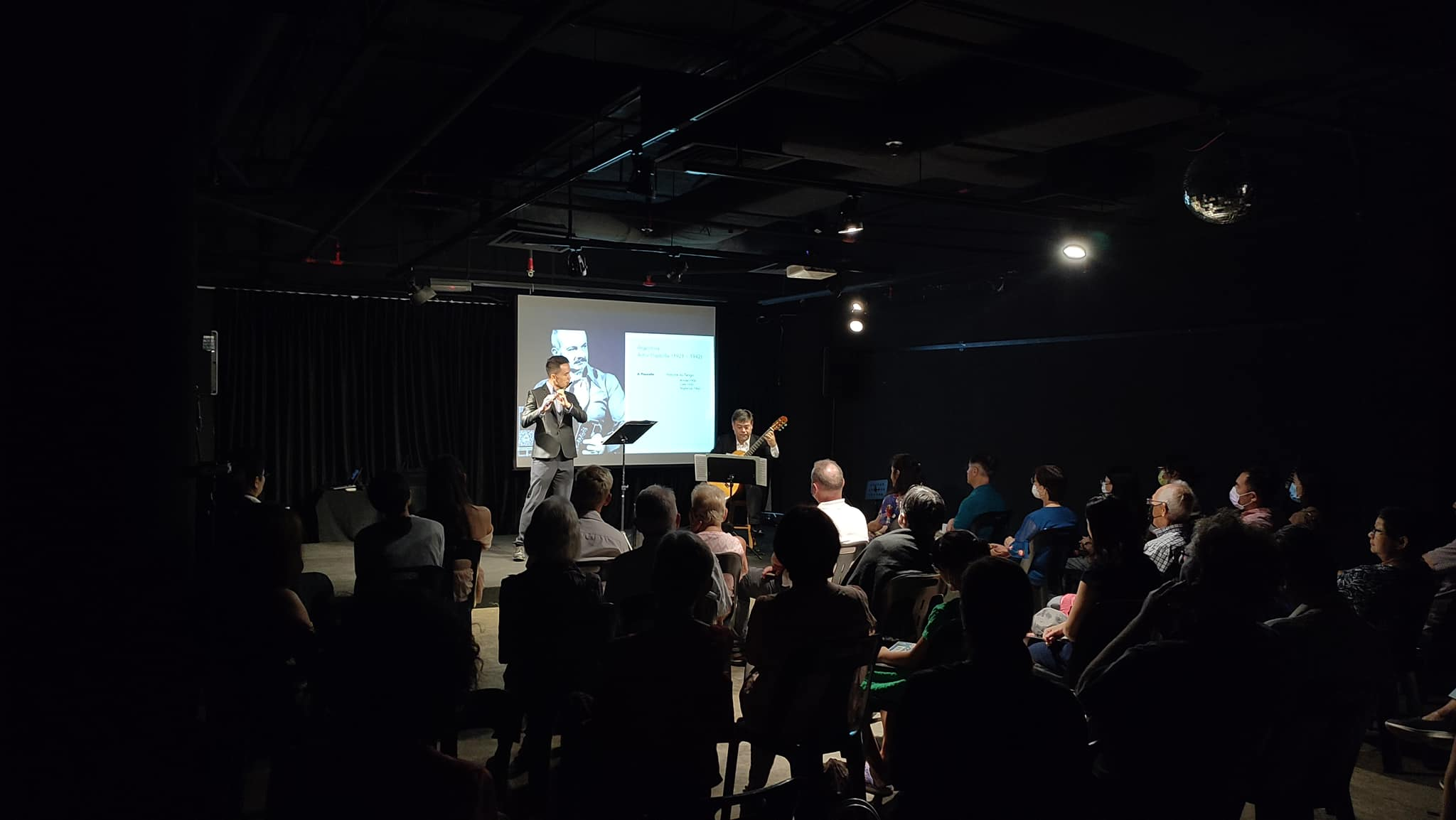
Black box at PHoM

A multi-purpose exhibition and performing space with a seating capacity of 100 to 150.

=== Events ===
Some of the notable events held at the black box include:

- The River Stairs & The Babus of Nayanjore
- Kisah Pulau Pinang
- Born Free Reunion
- Christine Dass Exhibition
- Exhibition of Album Covers by Tapa

== Resource Centre ==
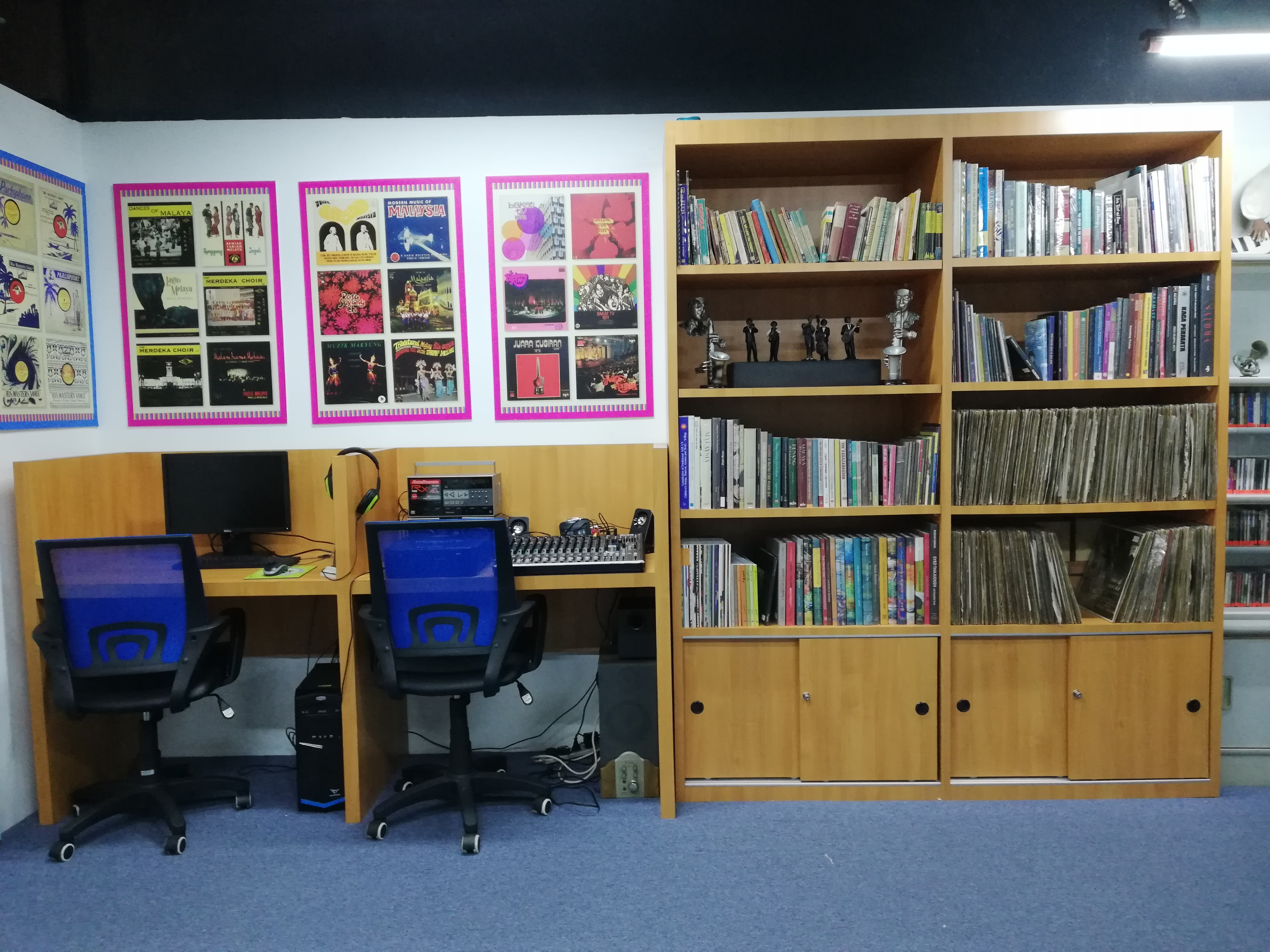
A section of PHoM's resource centre

PHoM's resource centre serves as a hub for musicians, scholars, academics, students, and anyone passionate about Penang's cultural heritage. It houses a collection of more than 30,000 mixed media items, including thousands of photographs, over 15,000 vinyl records, reel tapes, audio files featuring rare oral histories, books, magazines, journals, radios and music instruments.

=== Projects ===
The resource centre has organised, produced and contributed to a number of research projects, exhibitions, documentaries and archives. Among the highlights are:

- Echoes, Shadows & Footprints: A Symposium on Sustainability, Mobility and Nationalism in Malaysian Performing Arts and Culture.
- Hingga Akhir Nanti – A research documentary on The Alleycats by Nor Hazlin Nor Salam.
- A research documentary titled Jimmy Boyle: The Man and His Music.
- Bayangnya itu Timbul Tenggelam: An exhibition by Ilham Gallery exploring Malaysia's photographic history.
- Penang Players Visual Archive.

=== Articles & Publications ===
- Penang – Motherland of Musicians
- A Very Brief Note on Entertainment Magazines in Malaysia
- Global Movements, Local Sounds: Nusantara Music and Artists Overseas
- “Listeners Calling”: Radio Enters its Second Century in Malaysia
- Radio Request Cards: A Blast from the Past
- Remembering Penang’s Municipal Band
- Indian Music and Arts in Malaysia Have Many Roots
- Echoes, Shadows & Footprints: A Symposium on the Upkeep of the Arts
- Jimmy Boyle: The Man and His Music
- Record Covers From the PHoM Vault: A Visual Journey
- From the Archives: Music and the Formation of Malaysia

== International Recognition ==
- showcased as one of the case studies in the publication of Backstage: Managing creativity and the arts in South-East Asia
- hosted conference on ‘navigating (un) sustainability’, organised by the International Association for the Study of Popular Music, Southeast Asia branch (IASPM-SEA) and the International Council for Traditional Music, Malaysia National Committee (ICTM-Malaysia).

== Funding and Legal Issues ==
The project (PHoM) was awarded a grant of RM 3 million over 3 years in 2016 through the Penang State government and the Penang Water Supply Corporation.

From 2020 to 2022, the project received an annual grant of RM 500,000 from the Penang State government. However the grants were significantly delayed. The drop in visitors during the COVID-19 lockdown and delayed funds lead to payment disruptions and a legal dispute with the rental company over outstanding rent for the premise.

On the 13th of February 2024, PHoM announced on its social media accounts of its imminent closure due to financial struggles. It closed its doors on the 16th of March 2024 after more than seven years.
