= Fort Cornwallis =

Bastion fort in George Town, Penang, Malaysia

- Malay: Kota Cornwallis; Chinese: 康华利斯堡; Tamil: கார்ன்வாலிசு கோட்டை
- George Town, Penang in Malaysia
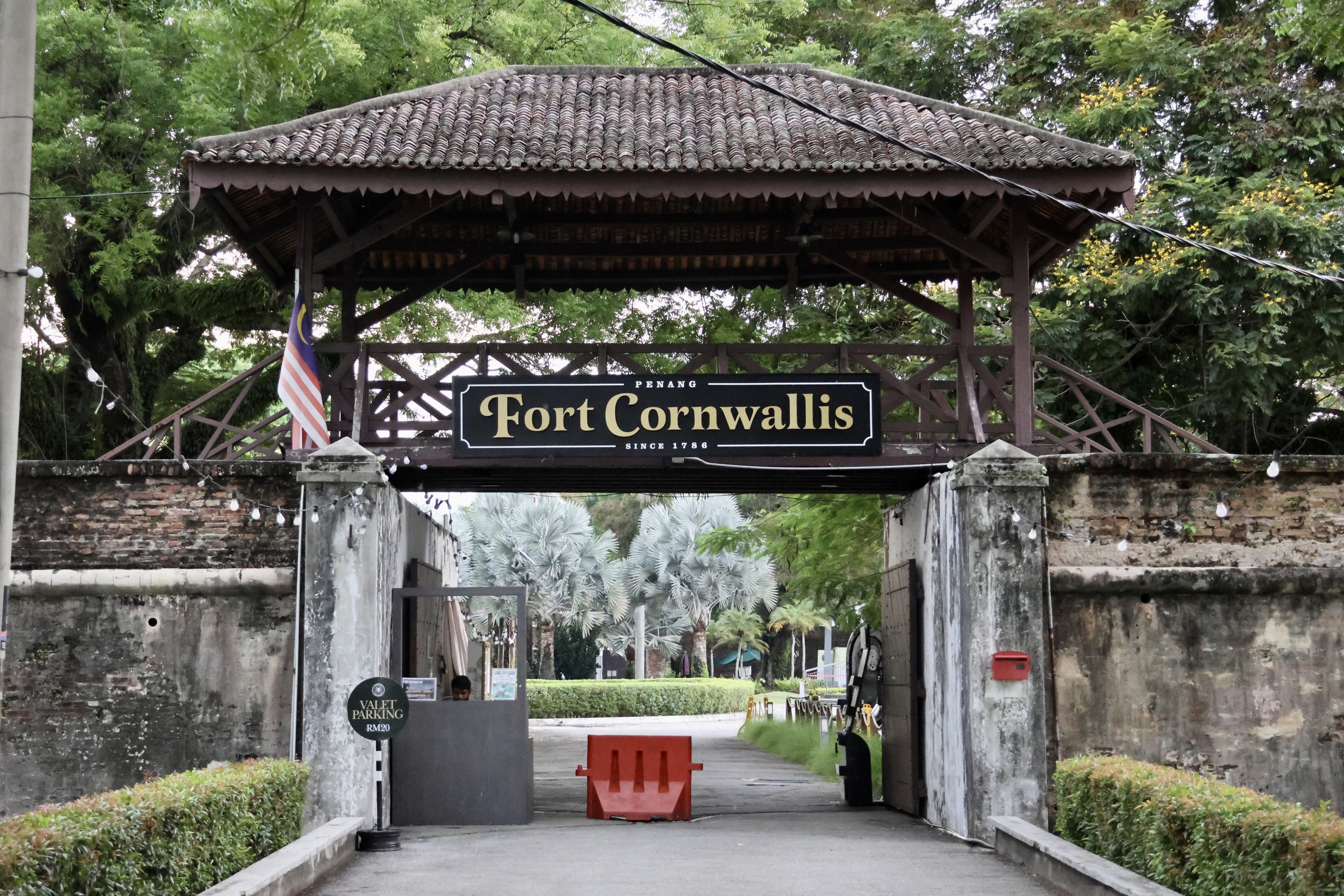

Site information
- Type: Fortress
- Open to the public: Yes
- Other site facilities: Fort Cornwallis Lighthouse; Seri Rambai cannon

Location
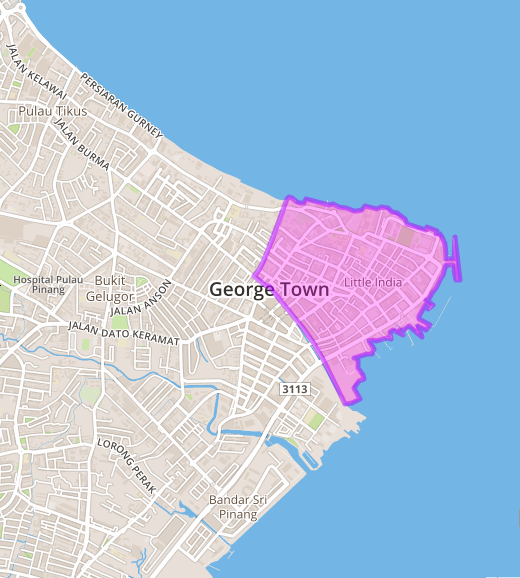
- Location within George Town's UNESCO World Heritage Site
- Coordinates: 5.4205°N 100.3439°E

UNESCO World Heritage Site
- Type: Cultural
- Criteria: ii, iii, iv
- Designated: 2008 (32nd session)
- Part of: George Town UNESCO Core Zone
- Reference no.: 1223
- Region: Asia-Pacific
- Area: 38.8 m^{2} (418 sq ft)

Site history
- Built: 1786; 240 years ago
- Built by: British East India Company
- In use: 1786–1881
- Materials: Brick

Fort Cornwallis is a bastion fort in George Town, Penang, Malaysia, built by the British East India Company in the late 18th century. Named after the then Lieutenant-General The 2nd Earl Cornwallis (1738–1805), the Governor-General of Bengal at the time of the fort's construction, it is the largest standing fort in Malaysia. The fort was built intended to respond to possible enemy threats during the Napoleonic Wars, a threat that in the end never materialised. The tourism fee to enter the fort costs RM10 for Malaysians and RM20 for foreigners.

== History ==
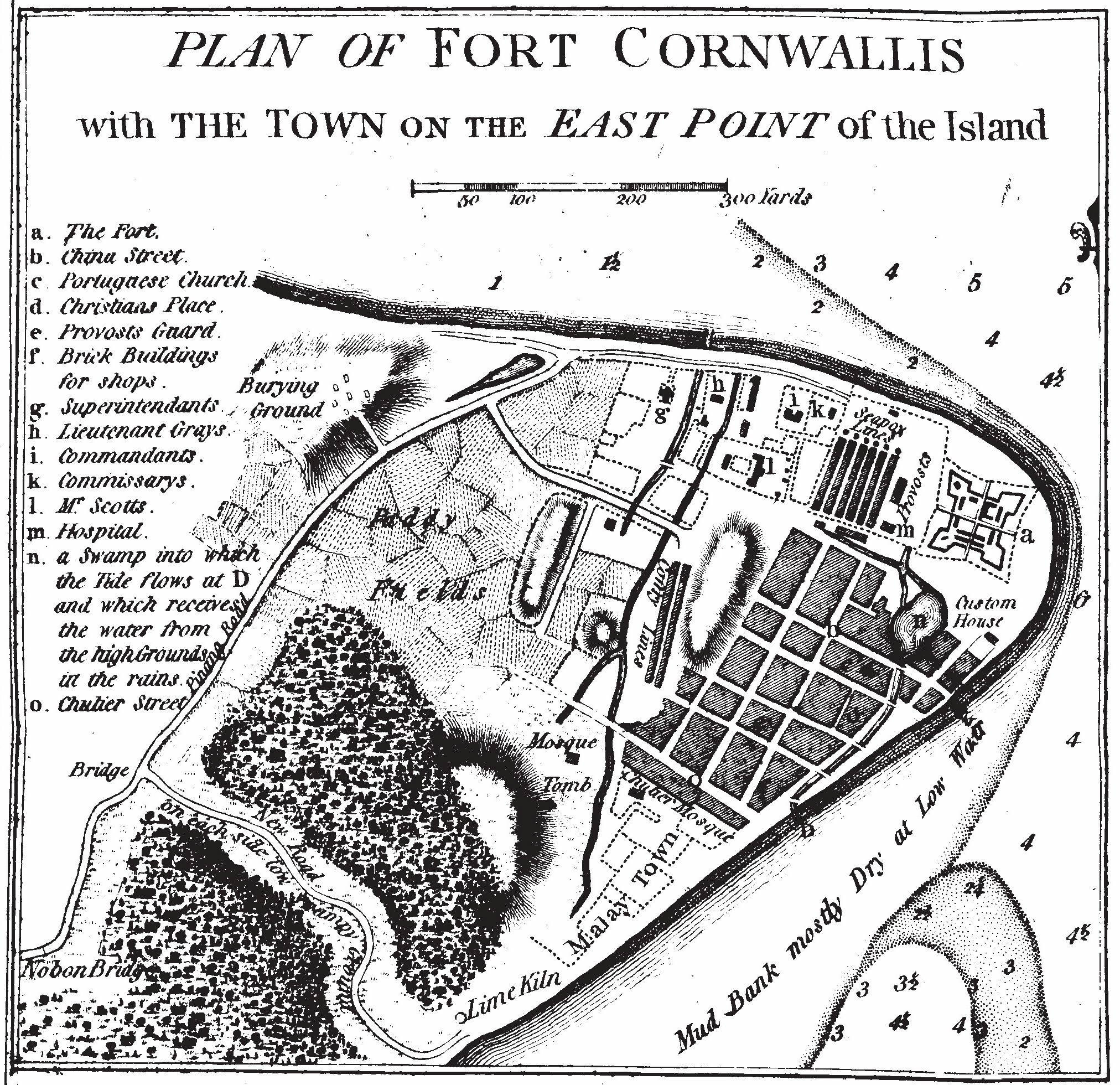
1799 map of George Town, with Fort Cornwallis at the northeastern tip of the promontory.

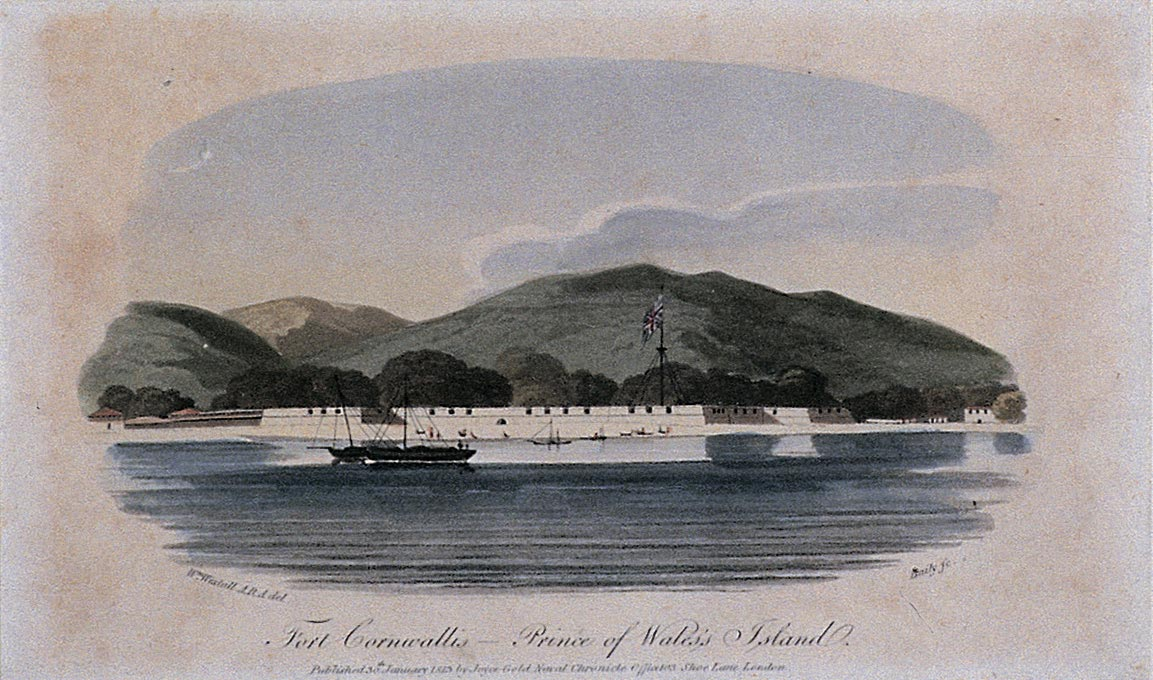
Engraving of Fort Cornwallis in 1804.

Captain Francis Light, R.N., took possession of Penang Island from the Sultan of Kedah in 1786 and built the original fort. It was a nibong (a Malay term meaning 'palm trunk') stockade with no permanent structures, covering an area of 417.6 square feet (38.80 m^{2}). The fort's purpose was to protect Penang from pirates and Kedah. Captain Light, who died in 1794, renamed Penang Island as Prince of Wales Island in 1786.

In 1804, after the outbreak of the Napoleonic Wars, and during Colonel R.T. Farquhar's term as Governor of Prince of Wales Island (also known as Penang Island), Indian convict labourers rebuilt the fort using brick and stone. Fort Cornwallis was completed in 1810, at the cost of $80,000, during Norman Macalister's term as Governor of Penang. The contractor of this brick and stone version of Fort Cornwallis was Lam To'Kai, the grandfather of Dr Wu Lien-teh. A moat 9 metres wide by 2 metres deep once surrounded the fort but it was filled in 1921 due to a malaria outbreak in the area. There was discussion of eventually demolishing the fort at this time, and the filled-in moat later became a surface car park.

Even though the fort was originally built for the British military, its function, historically, was more administrative than defensive. For example, the judge of the Supreme Court of Penang, Sir Edmond Stanley, an Anglo-Irish barrister, was first housed at Fort Cornwallis when the court opened on 31 May 1808. During the 1920s, the Sikh police of the Straits Settlements occupied the fort.

Royal Navy personnel under the direction of Rev. Peter Brown conducted an archaeological survey in July/August 1970. The fort was gazetted on 8 September 1977, under the Antiquities Act 168/1976, as an Ancient Monument and Historic site. Today, it is one of Penang's prime tourist attractions.

The fort underwent restoration works in 2026. As part of this, the former moat was excavated and restored in its original configuration.

== Architecture ==
The Chapel at Fort Cornwallis was built in 1799. The first recorded marriage here took place that same year when John Timmers married Martina Rozells, Light's widow. The building in the southwest bastion is almost certainly not the chapel, but the main magazine; the massive roof and the surrounding buttresses are typical of magazine buildings of the period. The building is the earliest roofed structure surviving in Penang from the colonial era.

Old cannons decorate the fort. The largest, known as Seri Rambai, was cast in 1603; in 1606 the Dutch East India Company gave it to the Sultan of Johore (Monarch of Johor). In 1613, the Acehnese took possession of Seri Rambai and carried it to Aceh. In 1795, the Achenese gave it to Kuala Selangor. The British seized Seri Rambai in 1871 as booty after a punitive raid on Kuala Selangor, and took the cannon to Penang. The government moved it to the fort in the 1950s.

A 21 m (69 ft) skeletal steel lighthouse was erected in the northeast corner of the fort in 1882. It is the second oldest lighthouse in Malaysia, after the Cape Rachado Lighthouse at Tanjung Tuan, Malacca. Originally named Fort Point Lighthouse, it was renamed Penang Harbour Lighthouse after renovation in 1914 and 1925. The State Tourism Development Committee chairman claimed in 2006 that it was the only lighthouse in Malaysia that resembles a ship's mast, and the only one in Peninsular Malaysia not serving any navigational purpose.

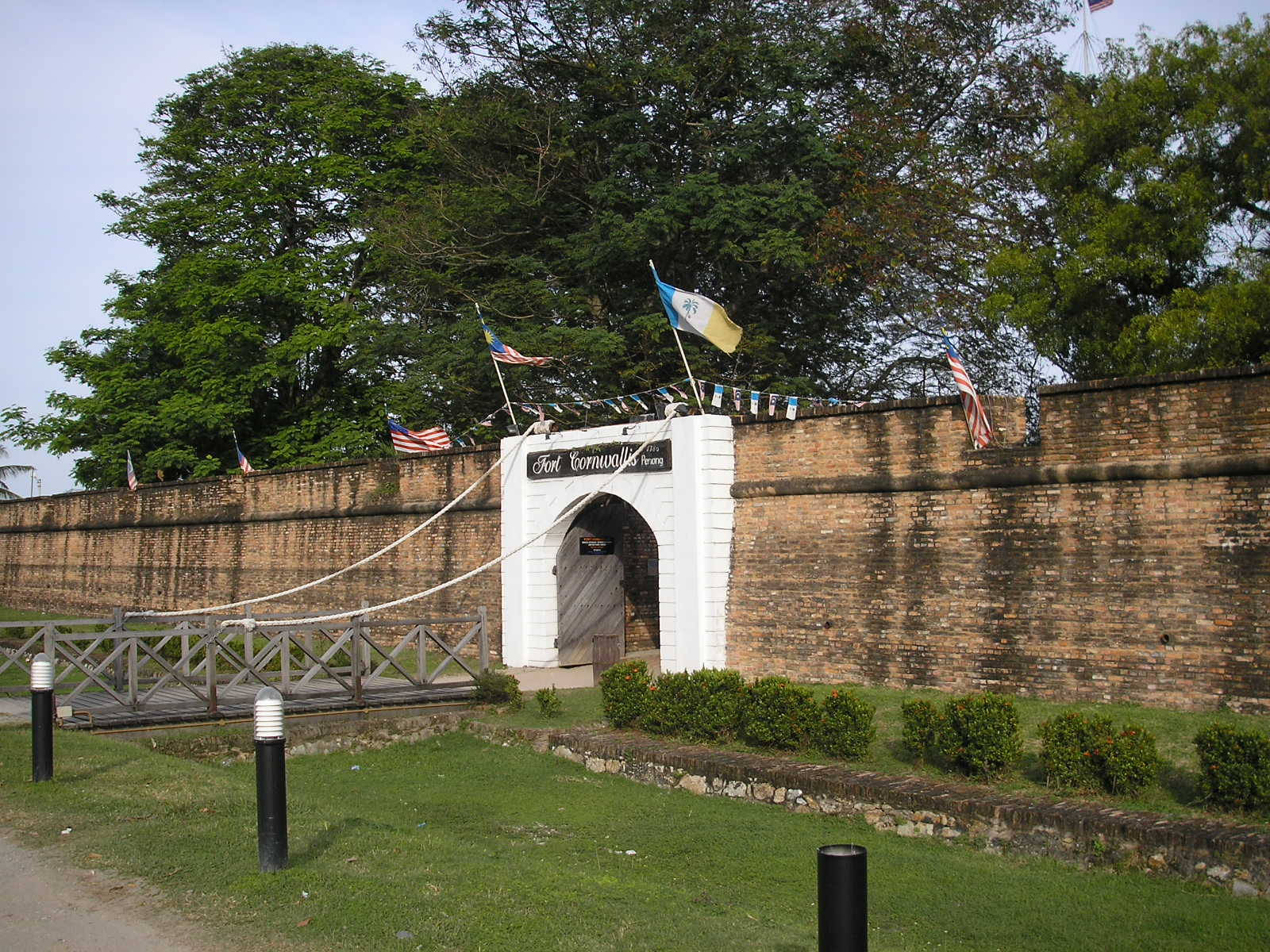
Entrance drawbridge of Fort Cornwallis.

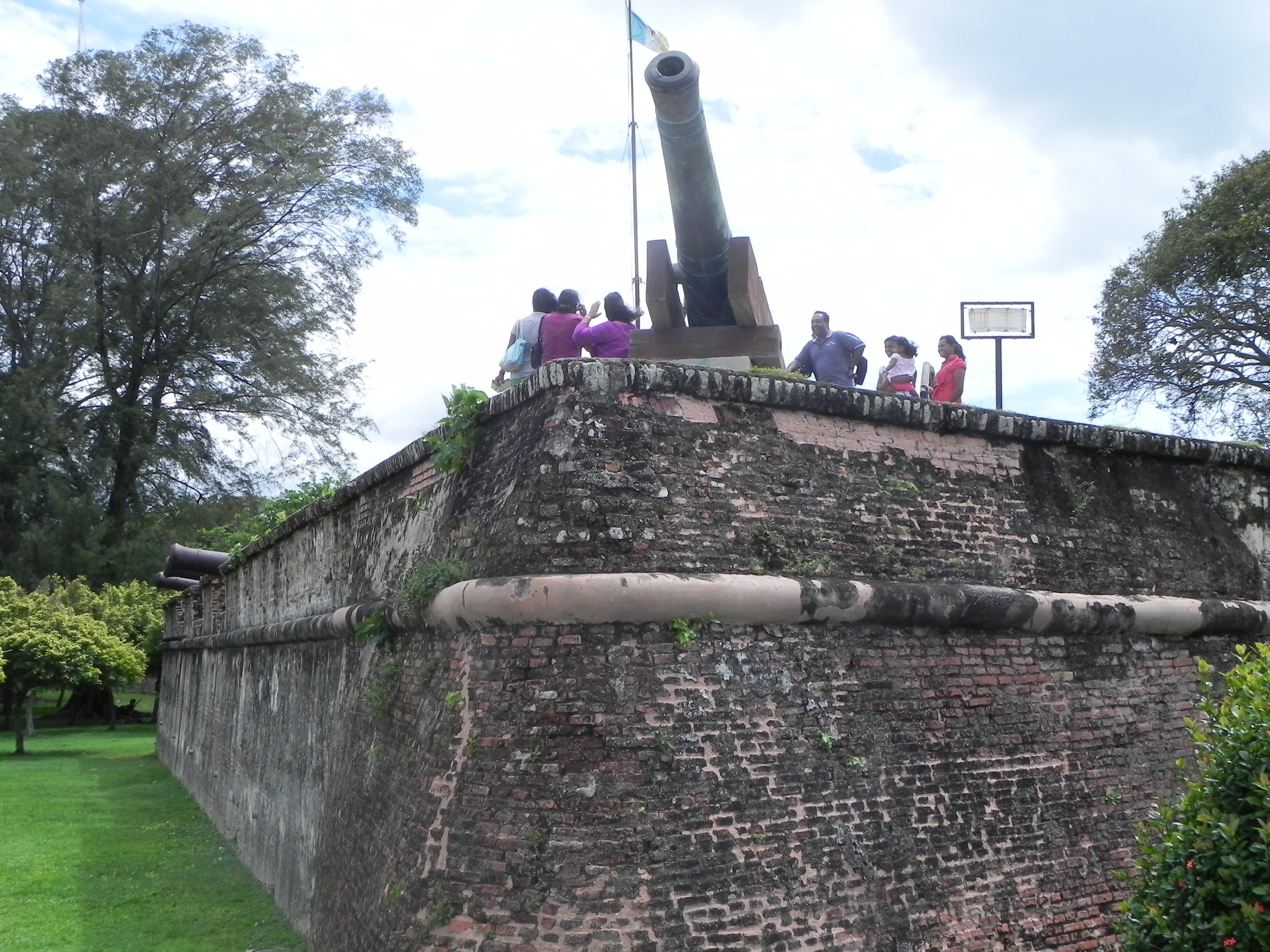
Seri Rambai Cannon and walls viewed from the Esplanade.

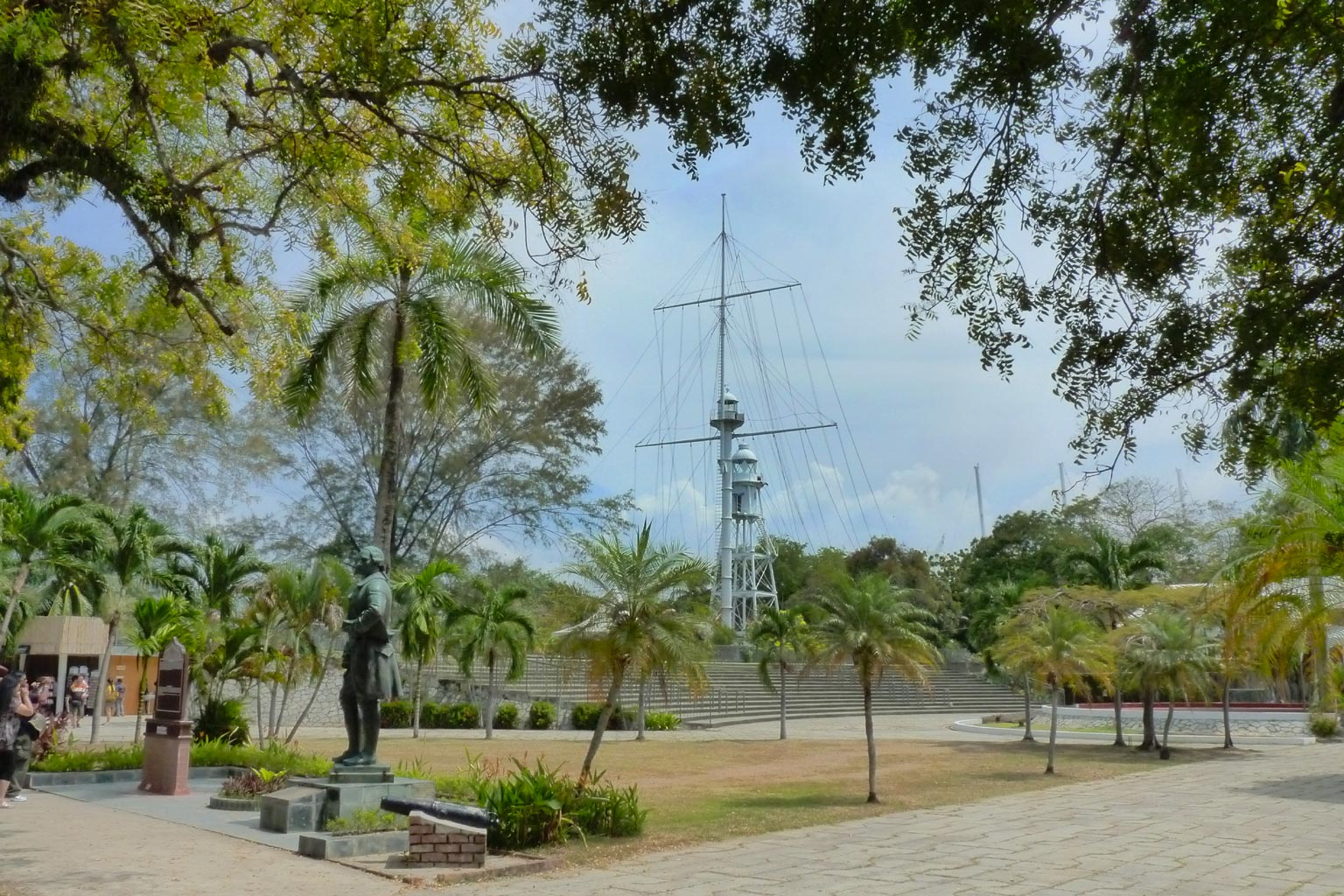
Interior in February 2011 with its lighthouse in the background.

== Sources ==
- "Fort Cornwallis, Penang | Malaysia Travel Guide" - http://travelmalaysiaguide.com/fort-cornwallis-penang/#ixzz0ED0j1tO0&A
- "Fort Cornwallis, Penang | Malaysia Travel Guide" - http://travelmalaysiaguide.com/fort-cornwallis-penang/#ixzz0ED1BjBSx&A
