= Melaka Light =

Lighthouse in Malacca City, Malaysia

Malacca Light
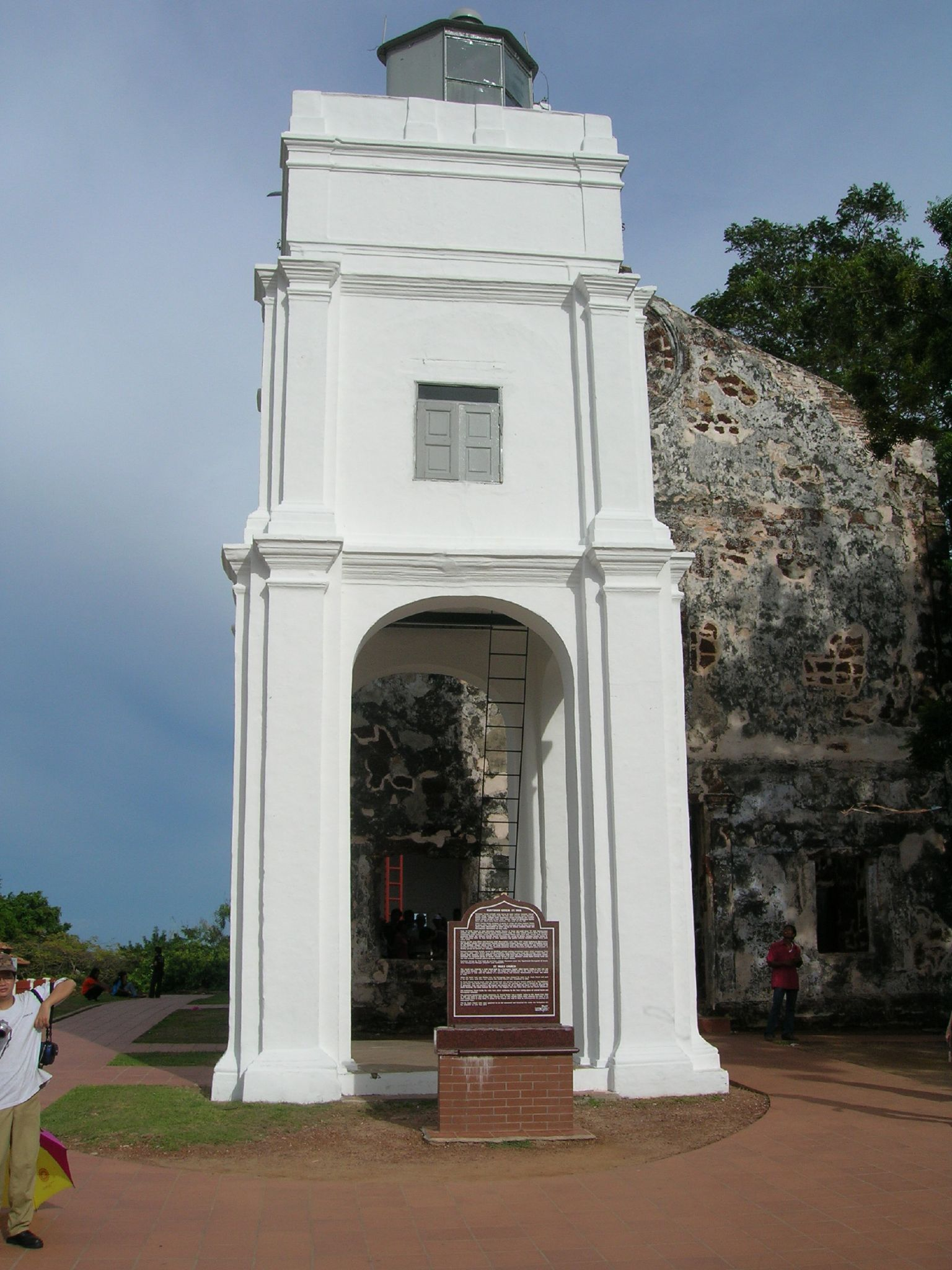
- Location: Malacca City, Malacca, Malaysia
- Coordinates: 2°11′33.9″N 102°14′57.8″E

Tower
- Constructed: 1849
- Construction: masonry tower
- Height: 13 metres (43 ft)
- Shape: square arched tower with balcony and lantern

Light
- Deactivated: unknown year
- Focal height: 118 metres (387 ft) (focal plane)

The Malacca Light is an inactive lighthouse in Malacca City, in the state of Malacca, Malaysia. It was commissioned during British rule in Malacca and was completed in 1849 as an additional beacon for ships travelling along the Strait of Malacca. The lighthouse is also notable for its location within the old harbour town of Malacca, atop St. Paul's Hill on the south side of the harbour and affront the ruins of St. Paul Church.

As the structure is located within an urban area, the Malacca Light is essentially an approximately 13 metre (43 feet) high, three-storey square tower with no outbuildings, assuming an angular form different from many of its cylindrical and cone shaped counterparts throughout the region. The masonry tower consists mainly of a lantern and gallery mounted on an arched base, and is solely accessible from ground level via a small ladder. Having been designed and built during the mid-19th century, the lighthouse adopted basic elements from neoclassical architecture. The tower is painted white.

== See also ==
- List of lighthouses in Malaysia
- List of tourist attractions in Malacca
