= Fort Cornwallis Lighthouse =

Lighthouse in Northeast, Penang, Malaysia

Fort Cornwallis Lighthouse Rumah Api Kota Cornwallis
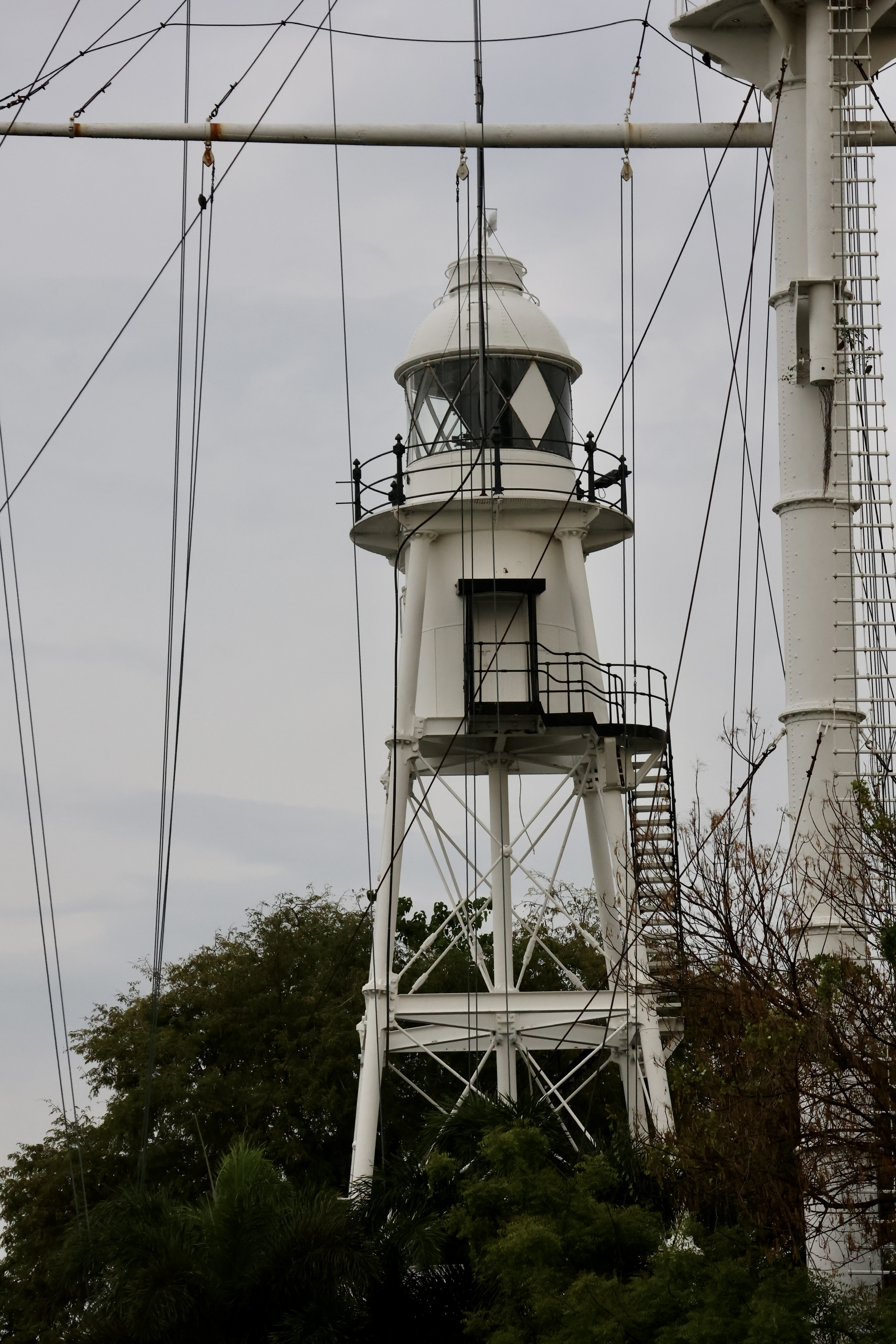
- Location: George Town, Penang, Malaysia
- Coordinates: 5°25′14.9″N 100°20′40.6″E

Tower
- Constructed: 1882
- Height: 21 metres (69 ft)
- Markings: White tower

Light
- Focal height: 27 m (89 ft)
- Range: 16 nautical miles (30 km; 18 mi)
- Characteristic: Fl R 2s

The Fort Cornwallis Lighthouse (Malay: Rumah Api Kota Cornwallis) is a lighthouse in Fort Cornwallis, George Town, Penang, Malaysia. It is currently under the management of the Maritime Authority of Malaysia.

== History ==
The lighthouse was constructed by the British Malaya government in 1882 as the Fort Point Lighthouse with a cost of £10,224. Between 1914 and 1928, the lighthouse underwent renovation and its name was changed to Penang Harbour Lighthouse.

== Architecture ==
The lighthouse is made of white steel framework and has a height of 21 metres (69 ft). The light beam reaches a distance of 16 nautical miles (18 mi; 30 km).

== See also ==
- List of tourist attractions in Penang
- List of lighthouses in Malaysia
