= Fort Cornwallis chapel =

Christian chapel in Malaysia

Coordinates: 5°25′13″N 100°20′36″E

Fort Cornwallis Chapel
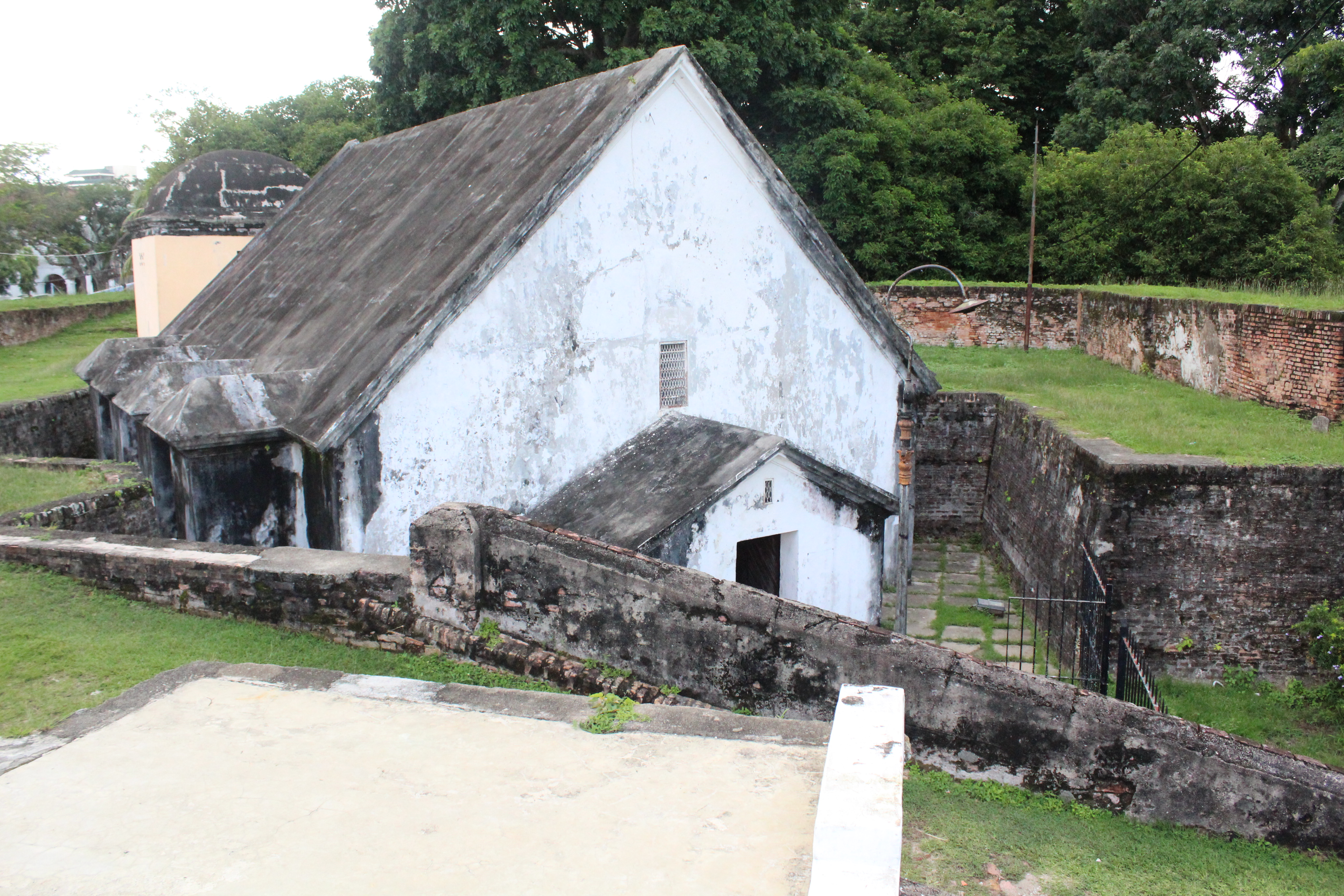
- Interactive map of the Fort Cornwallis Chapel area

General information
- Type: Christian chapel
- Location: George Town, Penang, Malaysia
- Completed: c.1800
- Closed: Unknown

Fort Cornwallis chapel is a Christian chapel situated inside Fort Cornwallis in George Town, within the Malaysian state of Penang.

== History ==
The chapel is the earliest roofed structure from the colonial period surviving in Penang, with the building's first recorded use as a Christian chapel taking place in 1799, when a marriage ceremony was conducted between Martina Rozells, widow of Francis Light, founder of the British colony of Penang, and John Timmers, a Dutch merchant.

In a report written in 1805 by Sir George Leith, the first Lieutenant-Governor of Prince of Wales' Island (now Penang Island), no mention is made of the existence of the chapel; only a barracks, arsenal, magazine and stores, suggesting that the building was originally designed for military use as an ammunition store.

From around 1819, church services were held at the newly consecrated St. George's church situated in nearby Farquhar Street.

== Description ==
The square-shaped building is nestled within one of the four bastions on the south-west side and protected by the defensive walls. The main entrance includes a vestibule which leads to the main room of the building which is illuminated by two small windows in the front and back walls. The interior consists of plain white walls, and the floor is covered with red tiles.
