= List of lighthouses in Malaysia =

Malaysia is a country largely surrounded by large bodies of water, most notably by the Strait of Malacca and the South China Sea, that have been used extensively for maritime transport as early as the 15th century. Numerous lighthouses were erected during present-day Malaysia's rule by the Portuguese Empire, the Dutch Empire and the British Empire (which oversaw the greatest number of new lighthouses built), and, later, the government of Malaysia, to provide navigation in and out of ports or through dangerous seas. Many of these lighthouses are situated on small islands and headlands.

The following lists lighthouses situated within the borders of Malaysia.

== Peninsular Malaysia ==
=== East coast ===
Lighthouses situated on the east coast of Peninsular Malaysia are frequently used for navigation at the South China Sea, as well as beacons into minor ports along the coast.

Lighthouse	Lat/Long	Constituency	State
Bukit Puteri Lighthouse	5.335597,103.098369	Kuala Terengganu	Terengganu
Sea Bell Rock Lighthouse	5.910211, 102.709773	Besut	Terengganu
Tumpat Lighthouse (part of railway station)	6.200479, 102.167092	Tumpat	Kelantan
Pantai Senok Lighthouse	6.163956, 102.347382	Bachok	Kelantan
Tanjung Gelang Lighthouse	3.963642, 103.436968	Kuantan	Pahang
Pulau Mungging Lighthouse	1.362227, 104.298122	Pengerang	Johor

=== West coast ===
The west coast of Peninsular Malaysia, which faces the Strait of Malacca, contains a large concentration of lighthouses aimed at navigation through the narrow strait, as well as serving to direct ships into major ports such as Port Klang, Malacca and Penang. Lighthouses in Johor are also used to guide ships into Singaporean waters, from which Singaporean counterparts provide navigation past the island or into the Port of Singapore. Most of the west coast lighthouses, as are Singapore's, are referred to as "The Straits Settlement Lighthouses", named after the former British-ruled territories that encompassed Singapore, Penang, Malacca and Dinding.

Lighthouse	Lat/Long	Constituency	State
One Fathom Bank Lighthouse	2.884233, 101	Port Swettenham	Selangor
Bukit Jugra Lighthouse	2.835895, 101.417509	Kuala Langat	Selangor
Althingsburg Lighthouse	3.341458, 101.244975	Kuala Selangor	Selangor
Pulau Angsa Lighthouse	3.1860212, 101.217490	Kuala Selangor	Selangor
Pulau Katak Lighthouse	4.156047, 100.619153	Lumut	Perak
Cape Rachado Lighthouse	2.407497, 101.852200	Masjid Tanah	Malacca
Melaka Light	2.192839, 102.249578	Kota Melaka	Malacca
Undan Island Lighthouse	2.050144, 102.333412	Kota Melaka	Malacca
Pulau Perak Lighthouse	5.683797, 98.938424	Pulau Langkawi	Kedah
Kuala Kedah Fort and Lighthouse	6.109615, 100.286522	Kuala Kedah	Kedah
Fort Cornwallis Lighthouse	5.421188, 100.344667	Georgetown	Penang
Muka Head Lighthouse	5.473674, 100.180769	Balik Pulau	Penang
Pulau Rimau Lighthouse	5.247480 100.273045	Bayan Lepas	Penang
Pulau Pisang Lighthouse	1.467961, 103.254383	Pontian	Johor
Bukit Segenting Lighthouse	1.792190, 102.889386	Batu Pahat	Johor
Pulau Sialu Lighthouse	1.788860, 102.885370	Batu Pahat	Johor
Tanjung Piai Lighthouse	1.259586, 103.509740	Tanjong Piai	Johor
Mudah Selatan Lighthouse	1.420597, 103.186778	Pontian	Johor
Panjang Selatan Light Beacon	1.394155, 103.122924	Pontian	Johor

== Sabah ==
Sabah, a Malaysian state on the island of Borneo, faces the South China Sea to the northwest, and the Sulu Sea to the northeast. The lighthouses are primarily used to navigate ships into smaller harbours such as Labuan and Tawau.

Lighthouse	Lat/Long	Constituency	State
Pulau Kalampunian Lighthouse	7.0521671, 116.7457880	Kudat	Sabah
Pulau Mantanani Lighthouse	6.7166787, 116.305755	Kudat	Sabah
Pulau Tiga Lighthouse	5.7555724, 115.6343140	Papar	Sabah
Pulau Kuraman Lighthouse	5.223852157, 115.1354535	Labuan	Wilayah Persekutuan
Pulau Papan Lighthouse	5.2529477, 115.2679977	Labuan	Wilayah Persekutuan
Batu Tinagat Lighthouse	4.2299475, 117.9805426	Tawau	Sabah
Pulau Berhala Lighthouse	5.8699292, 118.1455287	Sandakan	Sabah
Tanjung Trang Lighthouse	5.4235944, 119.2091190	Lahad Datu	Sabah

== Sarawak ==
Sarawak, another Malaysian state situated on the island of Borneo, operates lighthouses facing the South China Sea, which are all situated on headlands.

Lighthouse	Lat/Long	Constituency	State
Tanjung Baram Lighthouse	4.6252230, 113.9790350	Miri	Sarawak
Tanjung Lobang Lighthouse	4.3616662, 113.9627421	Miri	Sarawak
Tanjung Datu Lighthouse (on the Indonesian border)	2.0798194, 109.6441342	Lundu	Sarawak
Tanjung Jerijeh Lighthouse	2.1557579, 111.1670276	Tanjong Manis	Sarawak
Tanjung Sirik Lighthouse	2.7967016, 111.3353540	Tanjong Manis	Sarawak
Tanjung Po Lighthouse	1.7248309, 110.5239074	Santubong	Sarawak
Tanjung Kidurong Lighthouse	3.2745100, 113.0672334	Bintulu	Sarawak

== See also ==
- Lists of lighthouses and lightvessels
- Category of lighthouses in Singapore

== Notes and references ==
1. There are two lighthouses at the location, one on each side of the border

- Rowlett, Russ. "Lighthouses of West Malayasia East Coast". The Lighthouse Directory. University of North Carolina at Chapel Hill.
- Rowlett, Russ. "Lighthouses of West Malaysia West Coast". The Lighthouse Directory. University of North Carolina at Chapel Hill.
- Rowlett, Russ. "Lighthouses of Malaysia: Labuan and Sabah". The Lighthouse Directory. University of North Carolina at Chapel Hill.
- Rowlett, Russ. "Lighthouses of Malaysia: Sarawak". The Lighthouse Directory. University of North Carolina at Chapel Hill.
