= Batu Tinagat Lighthouse =

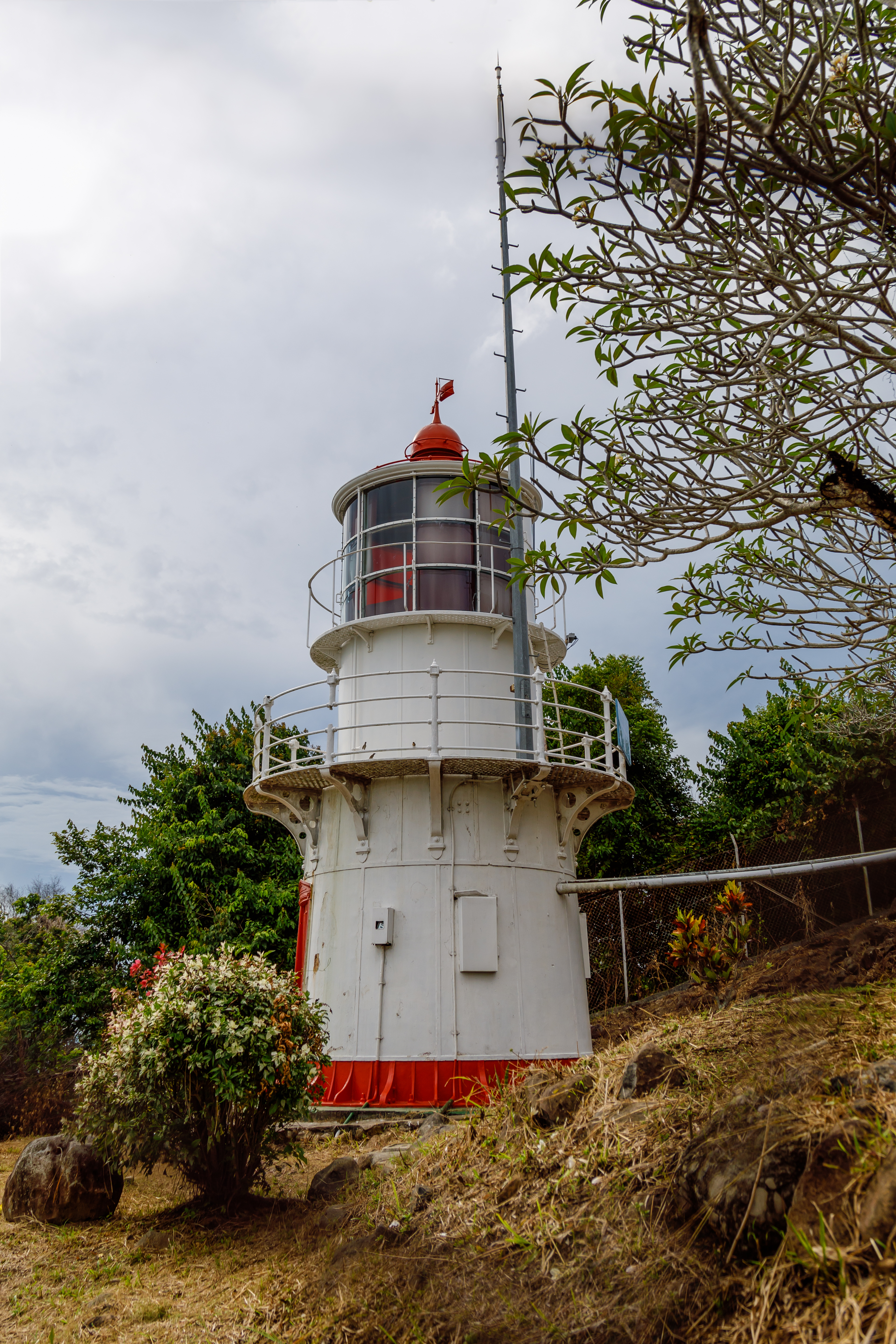
- Location: Batu Tinagat, Tawau Division, Sabah, Malaysia
- Coordinates: 4°13′33″N 117°58′51″E

Tower
- Constructed: 1916
- Construction: Cast Iron Plated Tower
- Height: 9 metres (30 ft)
- Shape: Round cylindrical cast iron tower with balcony, lantern and gallery
- Markings: White tower and red lantern

Light
- Deactivated: 2008
- Range: 25 nautical miles (46 km; 29 mi)

The Batu Tinagat Lighthouse (Malay: Rumah Api Batu Tinagat) is a lighthouse on Batu Tinagat of Tawau District, Tawau Division in Sabah, Malaysia. It is located approximately 10 kilometres from the Tawau town centre.

== History ==
The lighthouse components were delivered from Birmingham, United Kingdom by Chance Brothers and Co. Limited Lighthouse Engineers and Constructors in 1915. It was commissioned by the British North Borneo Chartered Company in 1916 to provide a safe night passage for ships to bring coal from Silimpopon to other ports in North Borneo, with much of its light in the early years was generated using kerosene.

The original specification was the "Light No. 2, 3rd Order, Revolving Single-Flashing-Light", consisting of 5 panels of 72° horizontal angle complete with mercury float pedestal, mercury and 20% as spare, clockwork, 55 m/m "Chance" Incandescent Vapour Installation comprising 3 burners, 50 mantles air and oil containers. The light was supposed to be erected on a tower of 23 feet (7.0 m) from ground level to focal plane of light, showing a white sector between red over the required angle. The construction suggested was a circular cast-iron tower, in which the weights controlling the clock would work. The tender amounted to £1852 for the light and £525 for the tower f.o.b. London.

The site for Batu Tinagat Lighthouse was chosen from the recommendations of Captain Frederick Charles Learmonth from HMS Merlin, a Survey Vessel, doing naval cartography for the British Admiralty. Captain Learmonth acted also as technical advisor for the lighthouse.

Following World War II, the lighthouse wall was damaged by the effects of aircraft machine gun attacks by either the Japanese or Allied forces. After the end of the war, the British colonial government approved a total of $80,595 to repair the lighthouse. By 1999, its source of light was delivered using solar energy until it was replaced by a new lighthouse in 2008.

On 23 February 2018, it is one of 24 heritage sites in the state that were gazetted by Sabah's State Heritage Council under new enactment of "State Heritage Enactment 2017".

== See also ==
- List of lighthouses in Malaysia
