= One Fathom Bank Lighthouse =

One Fathom Bank Lighthouse Rumah Api One Fathom Bank
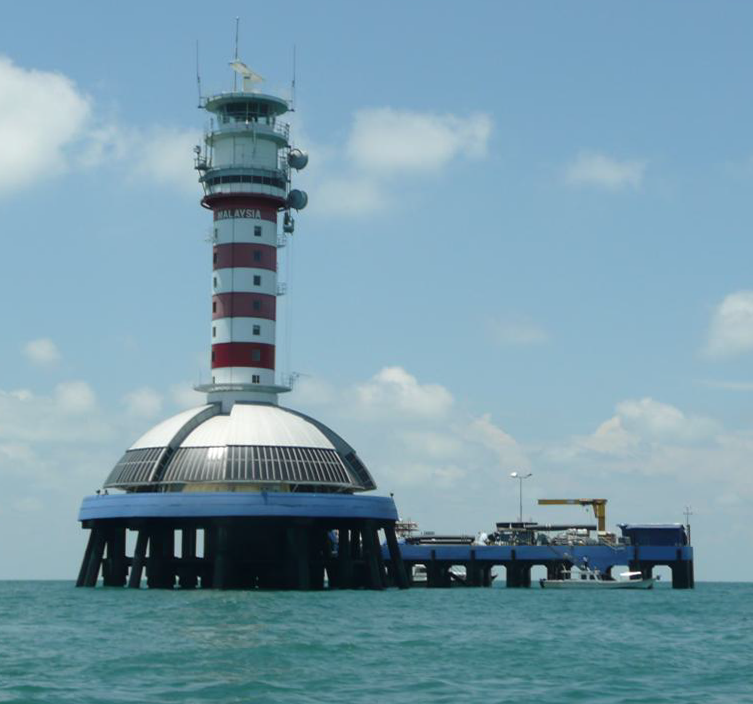
- Location: One Fathom Bank, Selangor, Malaysia
- Coordinates: 2°53′03″N 100°59′08″E

Tower
- Construction: Concrete pile lighthouse
- Height: 43 m (141 ft)
- Shape: Cylindrical tower with triple balcony and lantern
- Markings: stripe (red and white, horizontal direction)

Light
- First lit: 1999
- Focal height: 43 m (141 ft)
- Range: 23 nmi (43 km; 26 mi)
- Characteristic: Fl(4) W 20s
- 1907 lighthouse
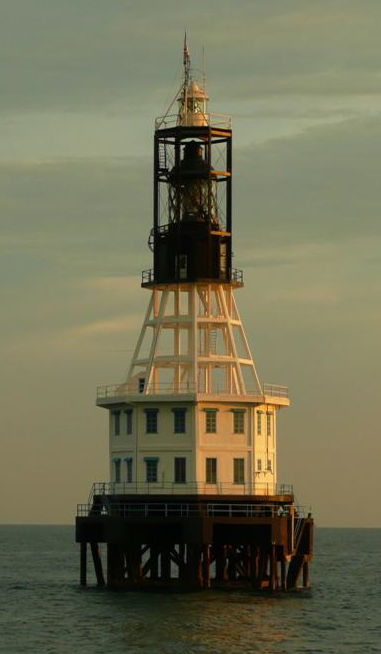
- The present "old lighthouse" is the third iteration of the One Fathom Bank Lighthouse to be built. It was deactivated after the new lighthouse began operation in 1999.
- Constructed: 1907
- Construction: Concrete pile lighthouse
- Height: 27 m (89 ft)
- Shape: octagon
- Markings: stripe (red and white, horizontal direction)
- Deactivated: 1999

The One Fathom Bank Lighthouse (Malay: Rumah Api One Fathom Bank or Rumah Api Permatang Sedepa) refers to two offshore lighthouses in the Strait of Malacca, specifically, on a shoal within Malaysian waters, dubbed One Fathom Bank (Permatang Sedepa), off the coast of the state of Selangor.

The One Fathom Bank station was originally served by a lightship stationed in 1852 before a permanent screw-pile lighthouse was built in 1874; the lighthouse has since been replaced twice over the course of its service, in 1907 with a concrete pile lighthouse, and in 1999 when a larger modern counterpart was built parallel to the 1907 lighthouse, superseding its predecessor's duties. The lighthouses have since been referred to as the "old" One Fathom Bank Lighthouse and the "new" One Fathom Bank Lighthouse.

Due to being well out to sea, both lighthouses are only accessible by boat. While both sites of the lighthouses are open, their towers remain off-limits.

== History ==
First reported during the mid-19th century by John Turnbull Thomson, a hydrographic surveyor, One Fathom Bank is a shoal located in the Strait of Malacca, between North Sands and South Sands, 30 kilometres (19 mi) southwest from the Klang Delta in Selangor. In its early years following its original survey, the bank was always referred to as 2 and 1/2 Fathom Bank, named as such for its sandbank that apparently emerged during low tide with water depths of less than two and a half fathoms (4.6 m).

The first move by the British Government of India in Bengal in 1848, which at the time managed maritime affairs along the Strait of Malacca, was to send two buoys to be placed to warn mariners. It was agreed that one should be placed on 2 and 1/2 Fathom Bank, but no one could agree what the second should mark, opinions varying from Blenheim Shoal through South Sands to as far south as Pyramid Shoal. In any case, most contemporary arguments favoured a lightship, since unlit buoys offered no aid to navigation at night. By 1850 arguments in favour of a screw pile structure were being advanced, reference being made to the recent British example at Maplin Sands. However, it seems that possible doubts about the solidity of 2 and 1/2 Fathom Bank led to the British placing a lightship at the site in 1852. Called the Torch, the vessel had previously been stationed off Sagar Point at the mouth of the Hooghly River in Bengal. That there may have been uncertainty is reflected in the debate about what should be the next light towards Singapore that appeared in the Singapore newspapers during the late 1850s. A government reply declared that the placement of a screw pile structure on Pyramid Shoal was to be refused on the grounds of the unsuitability of the seabed for such a structure. Nonetheless, if doubts there had been, by the early 1870s they had been stilled and the lightship, in increasingly poor repair, was replaced by a screw-pile lighthouse in 1874. This was followed by a second, concrete pile lighthouse in 1907, completed at the cost of £246,963.31, which remains standing to date. Following the founding of Port Swettenham (Port Klang) in 1893, the lighthouse additionally acted as a marker on the approach to the port.

The second lighthouse remained operational until the completion of a third lighthouse in 1999, which was erected parallel to the old lighthouse some 500 metres (1,600 ft) away at a cost of RM18 million for improved navigation and security. While the older lighthouse has been deactivated and unused, efforts were made by the Department of Marine and related authorities, such as the Department of Public Works and the then Department of Museums and Antiquities, to restore it in 2004 and 2005 due to its historical and architectural value.

== Design ==
=== Old lighthouse ===
The present "old" One Fathom Bank Lighthouse is essentially a 27-metre (89 ft) high concrete-pile lighthouse. Built on a circular-like arrangement of piles, the lighthouse is generally designed as an octagonal structure: Both the two storey keeper's house standing on the piles and the skeletal cast iron tower above that houses and supports the lantern, gallery, and watchroom are octagonal; the tower supporting the lantern tapers towards the top. The lighthouse tower was also painted with red and white horizontal bands, which has since faded and repainted white.

=== New lighthouse ===
The newer, modernised One Fathom Bank Lighthouse was constructed in 1999 with the intended purpose of accommodating better equipment, but is similarly based on pilings. At 43 metres (141 ft), the new lighthouse dwarfs the old lighthouse, and contains more space and an additional concrete jetty to support larger sea vessels.

The lighthouse consists of a round cylindrical steel tower, similarly painted with red and white horizontal bands, rising from the centre of a dome-shaped equipment shelter and supporting the lantern and triple gallery; the dome is further mounted on a circular platform supported by the pilings. The roof is made from high-quality polycarbonate and polished metal.

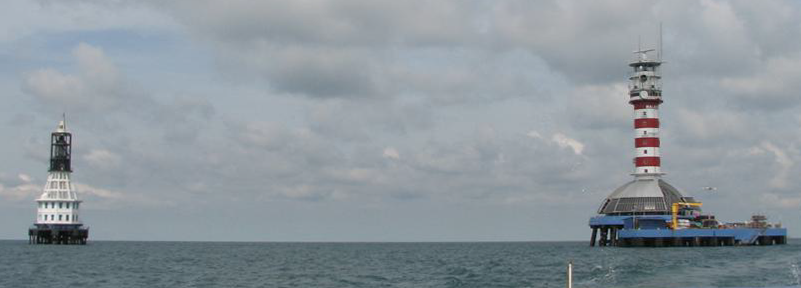
Both One Fathom Bank Lighthouses are situated a mere 500 metres apart, as seen in this photograph.

== See also ==
- List of lighthouses in Malaysia
