= Cape Rachado Lighthouse =

Lighthouse in Alor Gajah, Melaka, Malaysia

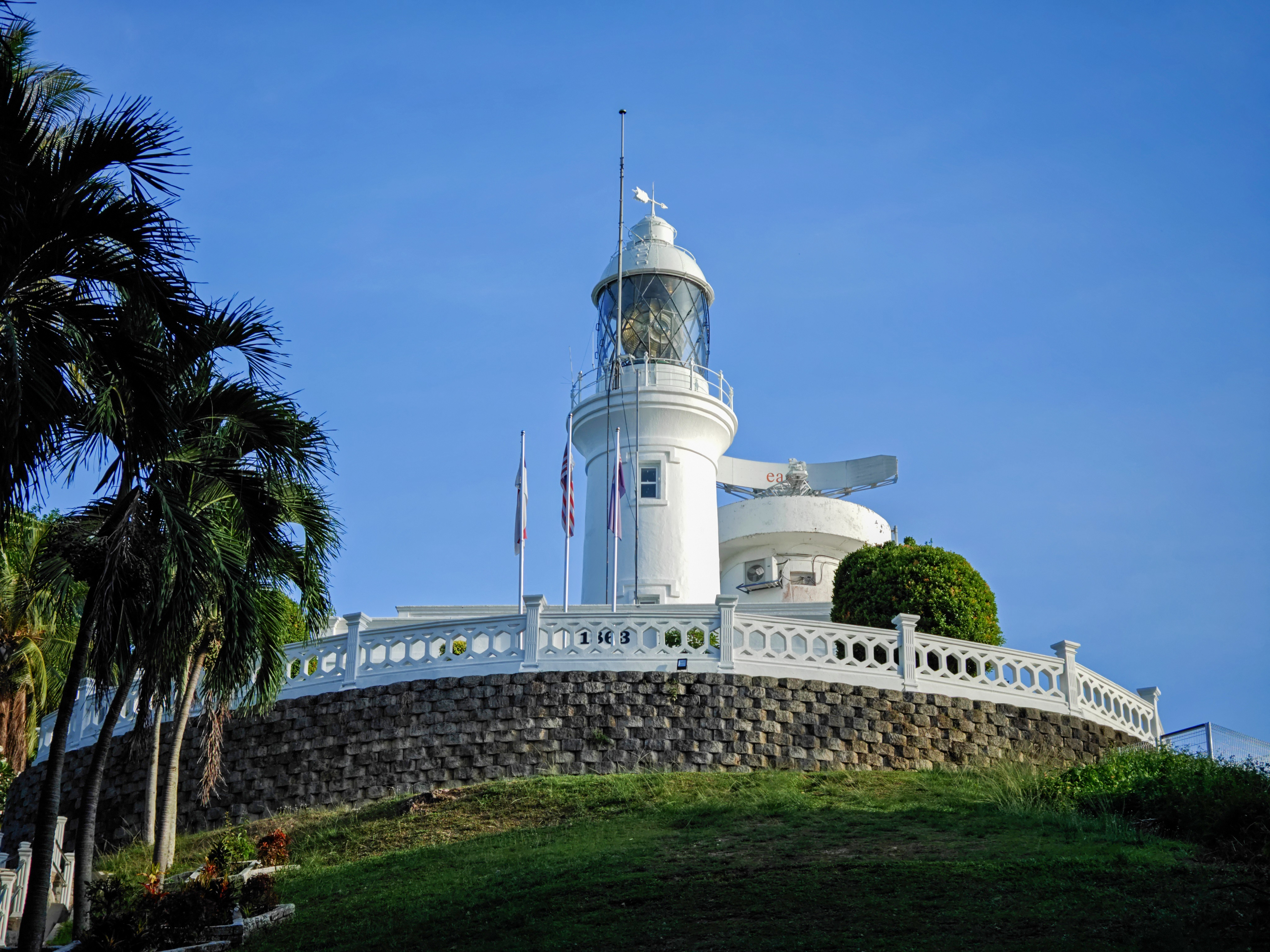
- Location: Tanjung Tuan, Alor Gajah District, Malacca, Malaysia
- Coordinates: 2°24′26″N 101°51′08″E

Tower
- Constructed: 1863
- Construction: masonry (tower)
- Height: 24 m (79 ft)
- Shape: cylinder
- Markings: White (tower), white (lantern)

Light
- First lit: 1863
- Focal height: 118 m (387 ft)
- Lens: first order Fresnel lens
- Range: 23 nmi (43 km; 26 mi)
- Characteristic: Fl(3) W 15s

The Cape Rachado Lighthouse (Malay: Rumah Api Tanjung Tuan) is a lighthouse located at Cape Rachado (Malay: Tanjung Tuan), in Alor Gajah District, Malacca, Malaysia. The lighthouse is believed to be the oldest in the country, its history allegedly dating back to Portuguese rule of Malacca during the 16th century, although the present structure is a 19th-century construction.

== History ==
The early history of the lighthouse remains largely unverified, with unofficial accounts by locals tracing the lighthouse's history back to a period following the conquest of Malacca by Portugal in 1511. The Portuguese government in Malacca vested interest in the construction of a lighthouse to guide its ships through the narrow Straits of Malacca, completing the first iteration of the structure on Cape Rachado (a name given by the Portuguese, meaning "Broken Cape") in the 16th century. Possession of the lighthouse was handed over to the Dutch VOC, alongside Malacca in entirety in 1641, and a second version of the building was claimed to have been built in 1817, during temporary rule by the British under William Farquhar, seven years before Malacca's total changeover to the British in 1824.

The present lighthouse was constructed in 1863, during Malacca's status as a British-ruled Straits Settlement, and remains active as of 2008. In 1990, a concrete tower was built by to the original lighthouse to house a MEASAT radar.

== Design and location ==
The current lighthouse erected in 1863 consists of a 24-metre (79 feet) high circular tower with a lantern and gallery, and adjoining double storey keeper's house at the base, both constructed of masonry and whitewashed. An additional tower completed in 1990 was constructed using reinforced concrete, and holds a MEASAT radar, designed to monitor ship traffic in the Strait of Malacca and aid in communications, at the top of the structure. The lighthouse is entirely based on a fort-like foundation.

The lighthouse is located on a summit at Cape Rachado roughly 100 meters inland, and is enclosed within woodland, which makes the lighthouse's location an ideal area for birdwatching. Access to the lighthouse is largely restricted to travel by foot, with the immediate site accessible only via two stairwells: a spiral staircase with 72 steps and a stone staircase behind the lighthouse, the latter serving as an easier access point to the lighthouse.

== See also ==
- List of lighthouses in Malaysia
- Battle of Cape Rachado
- Tanjung Tuan
