= Tanjung Tuan =

Cape in Malacca, Malaysia

Tanjung Tuan Cape Rachado Cabo Rachado (Portuguese)
- Exclave of Malacca
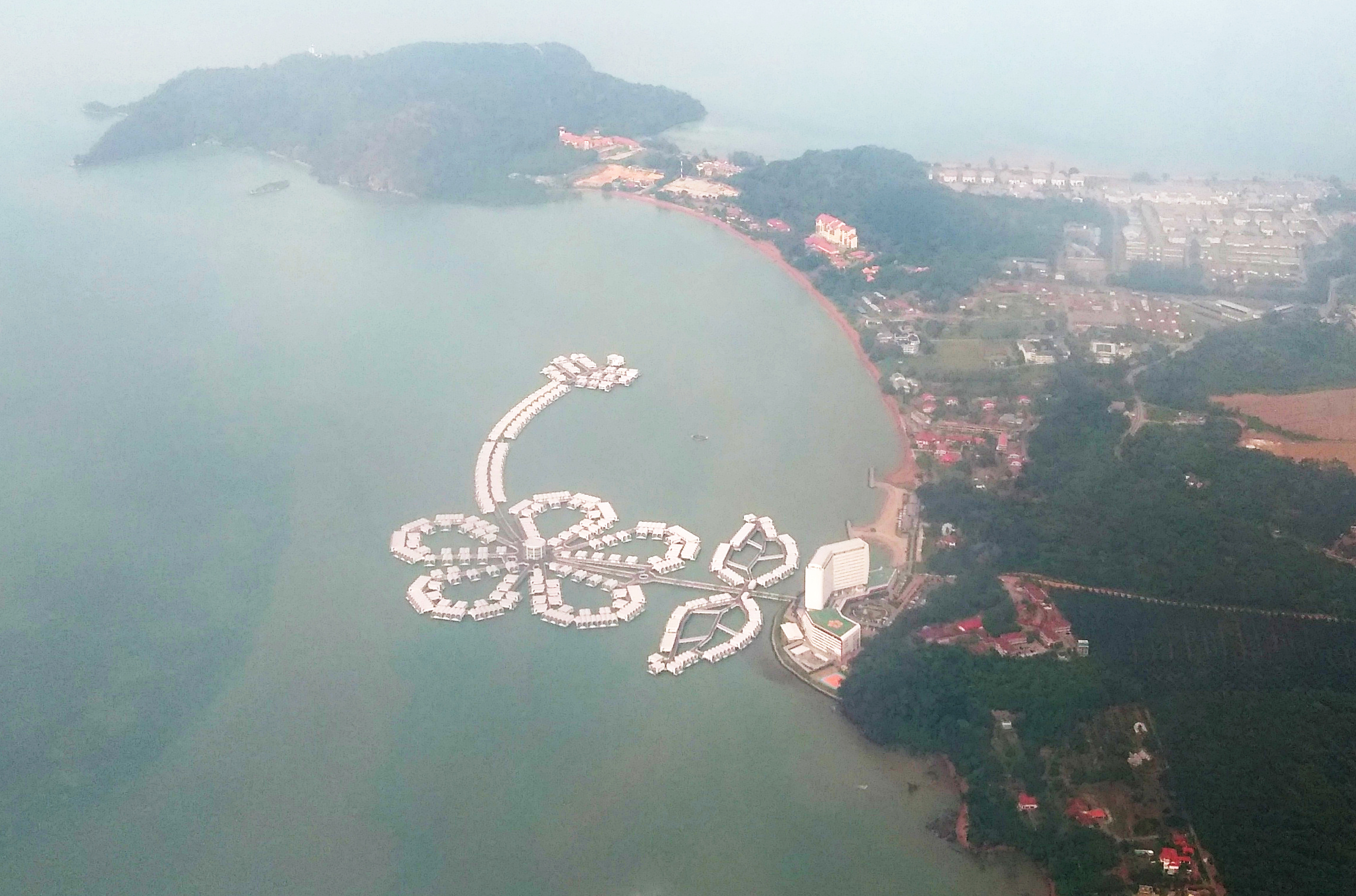
- Bird's eye view of the Tanjung Tuan peninsula

- Location within Malacca Location within Peninsular Malaysia
- Coordinates: 2°24′N 101°52′E
- Country: Malaysia
- State: Malacca
- District: Alor Gajah
- Mukim: Kuala Linggi

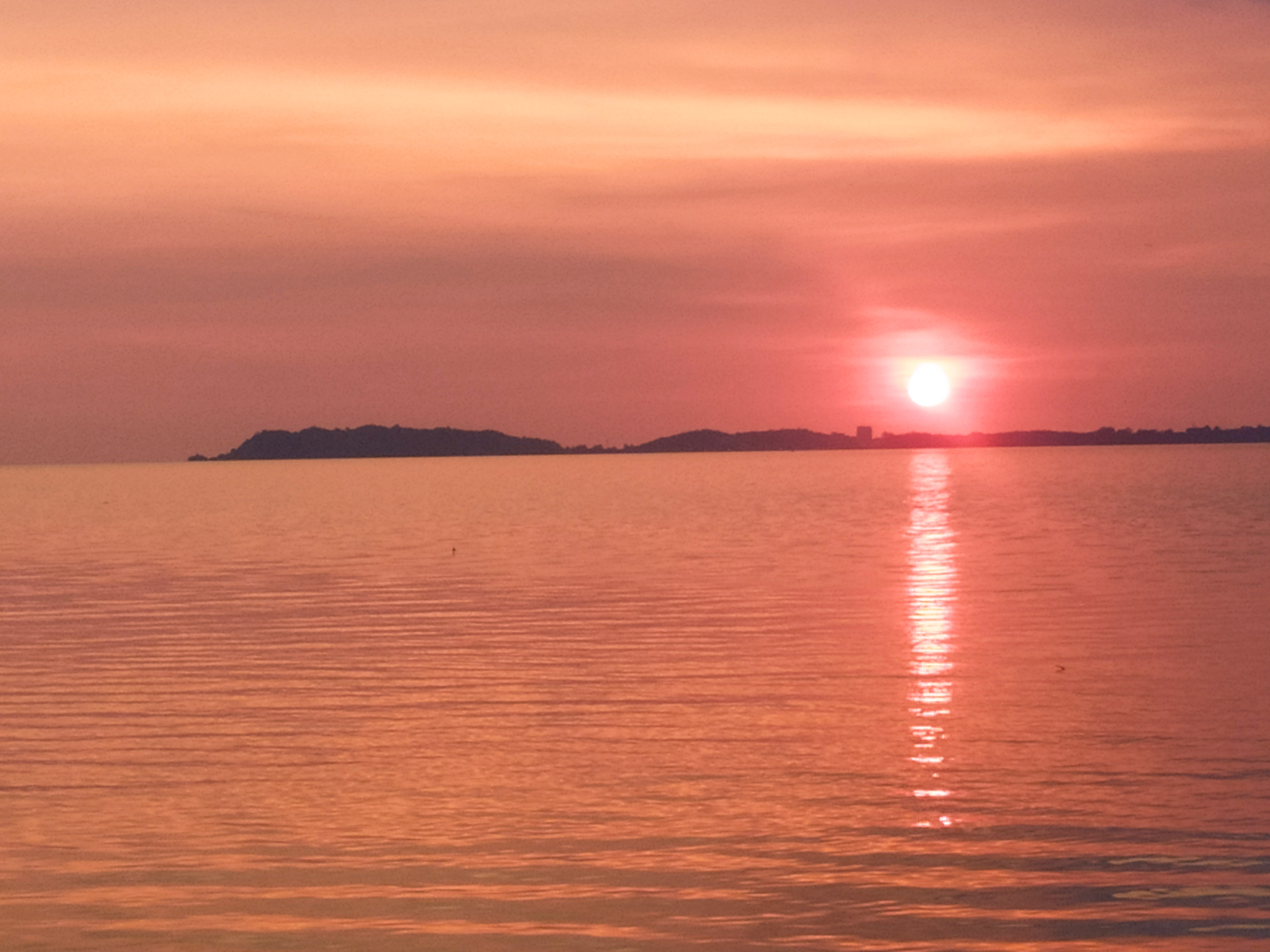
Tanjung Tuan as viewed over the estuary of the Linggi River, on the northern extremity of the Malaccan coastline.

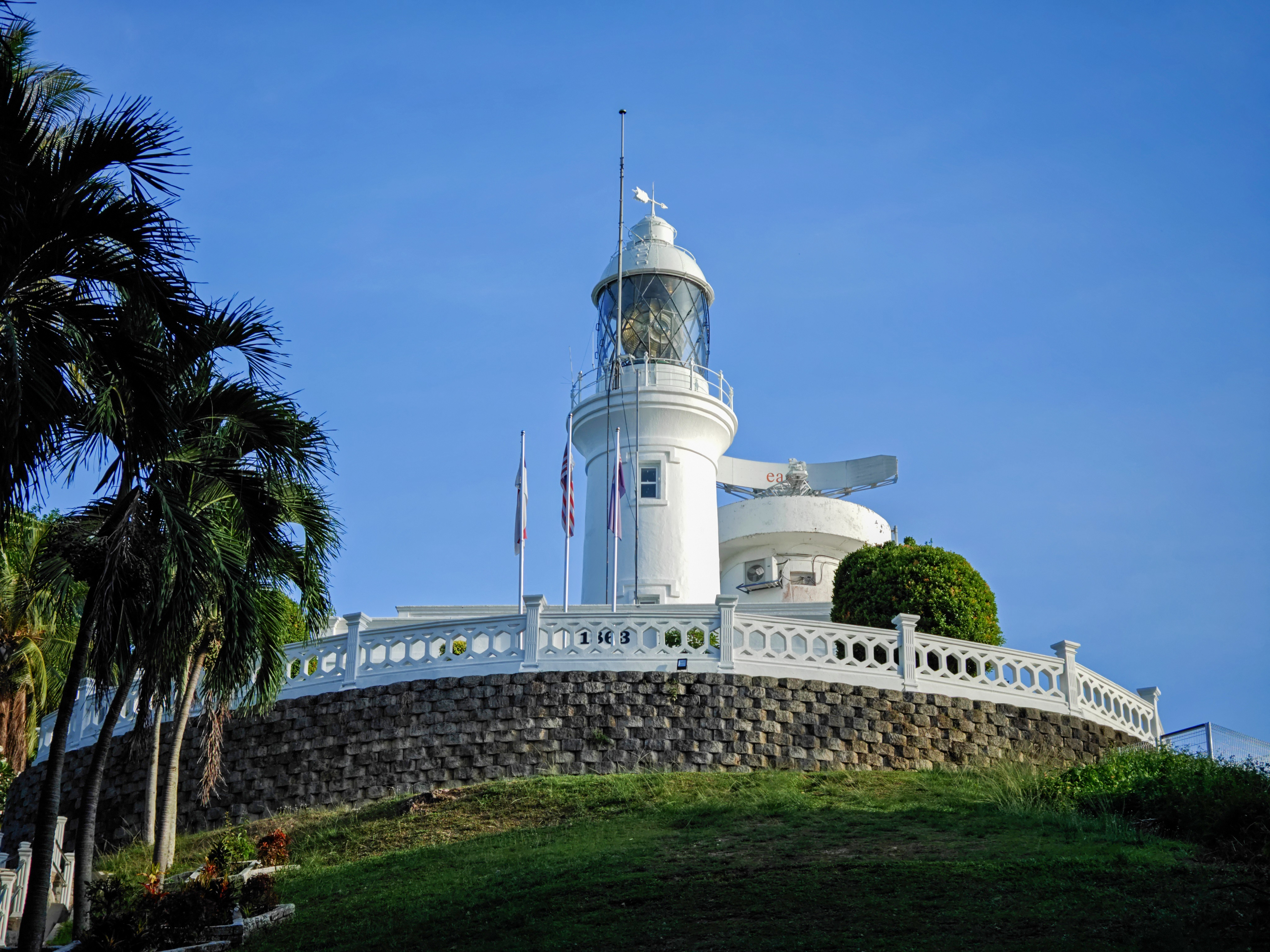
The Cape Rachado Lighthouse, the oldest lighthouse in Malaysia in continuous operation.

Tanjung Tuan (lit. 'Lord's Cape'), formerly known as Cape Rachado as named by the Portuguese, meaning 'broken cape', is an area in Alor Gajah District, Malacca, Malaysia. It is a semi-exclave of Malacca adjacent to Port Dickson, Negeri Sembilan.

The cape is well known for the Cape Rachado Lighthouse facing the Strait of Malacca. The coastal area off the cape is famous as the site of the naval Battle of Cape Rachado in 1606, between the Dutch East India Company (VOC) and Portuguese fleets. The battle was the opening act for the series of conflicts between the Dutch-Johor coalition and Portuguese Malacca that ultimately ended with the Portuguese surrender of the city and fort of Malacca to the VOC in 1641.

== Lighthouse ==
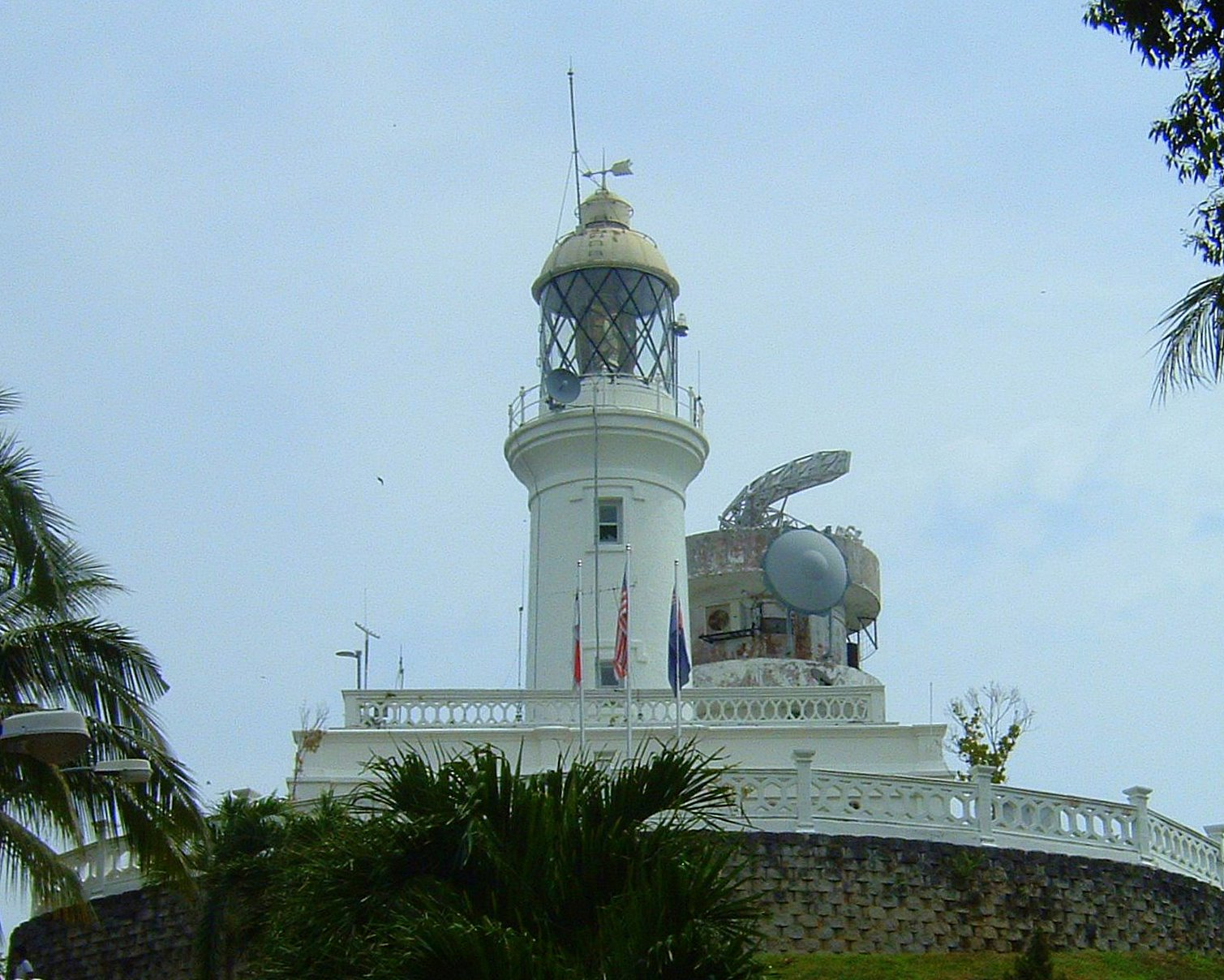
Cape Rachado Lighthouse

After Portugal conquered the Malacca Sultanate in 1511, the Portuguese wanted to build a lighthouse to guide its ships. Tanjung Tuan was chosen and the cape was named Cape Rachado by them. Subsequently, a lighthouse was built between 1528 and 1529. As Malacca switched hands to the Dutch and later to the British in 1641 and 1824 respectively, so too did the possession of the structure.

== Forest reserve ==
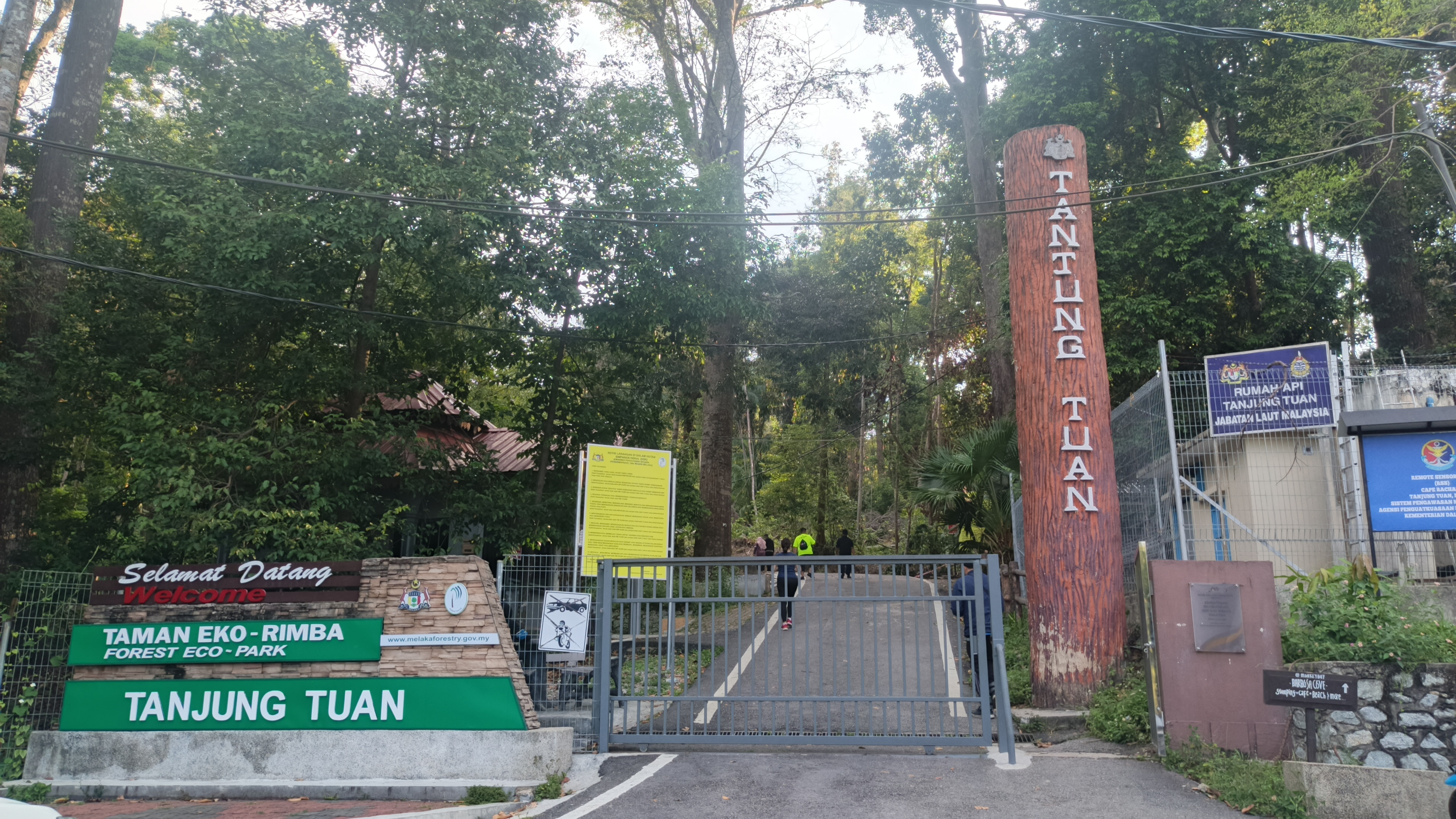
Tanjung Tuan Forest Eco-Park

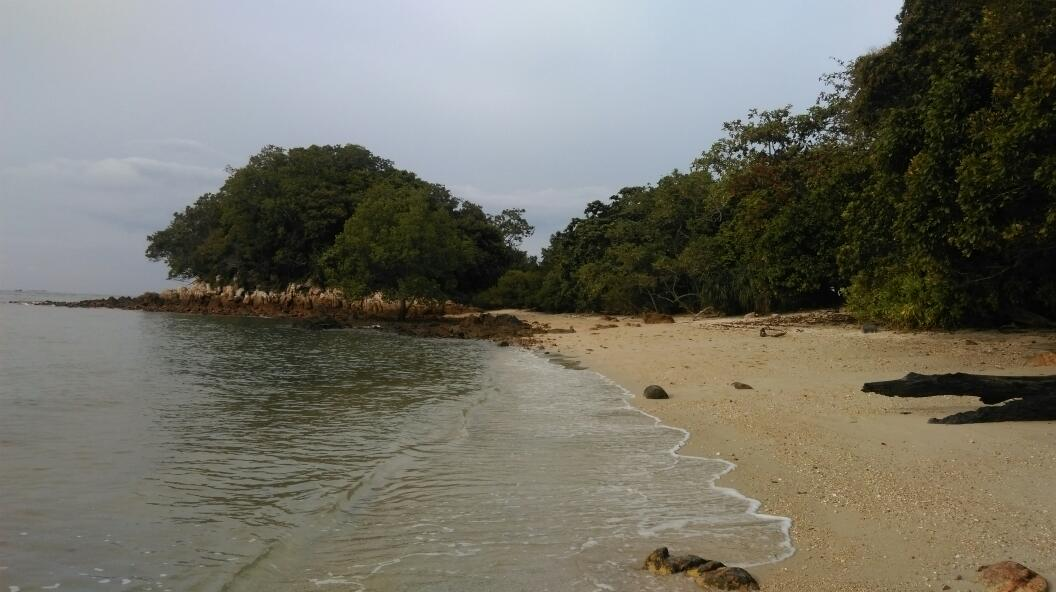
Beach in Tanjung Tuan.

In 1921, the area was gazetted as a permanent forest reserve under Gazette No. : 2066 dated 23 December, 1921 (No.Warta : 2066 bertarikh 23 Disember, 1921) with 809,700 square metres under the name of Cape Rachado Forest Reserve. However, in 1969 an area of 161,900 square metres was degazetted from the permanent forest reserve status for the purpose of public use under Gazette No. : 328 dated 25 December, 1969 (No.Warta : 328 bertarikh 25 Disember, 1969).

On 5 January 1971, The rest of the 607,000 square metres of the Cape Rachado forest reserves was gazetted as a wildlife sanctuary under the jurisdiction of PERHILITAN (forestry and wildlife protection department) under M.P.U.5 and PG No: 85 under the Birds and Wild Life Protection Ordinance, 1955 (Ordinan Perlindungan Binatang-Binatang Liar dan Burung-Burung, 1955).

On 16 April 1996, private company Dataran Baiduri Sdn Bhd was assigned to commercially develop the park.

This area has been designated by BirdLife International as an Important Bird Area. The Malaysian Nature Society is active in promoting conservation in the area.

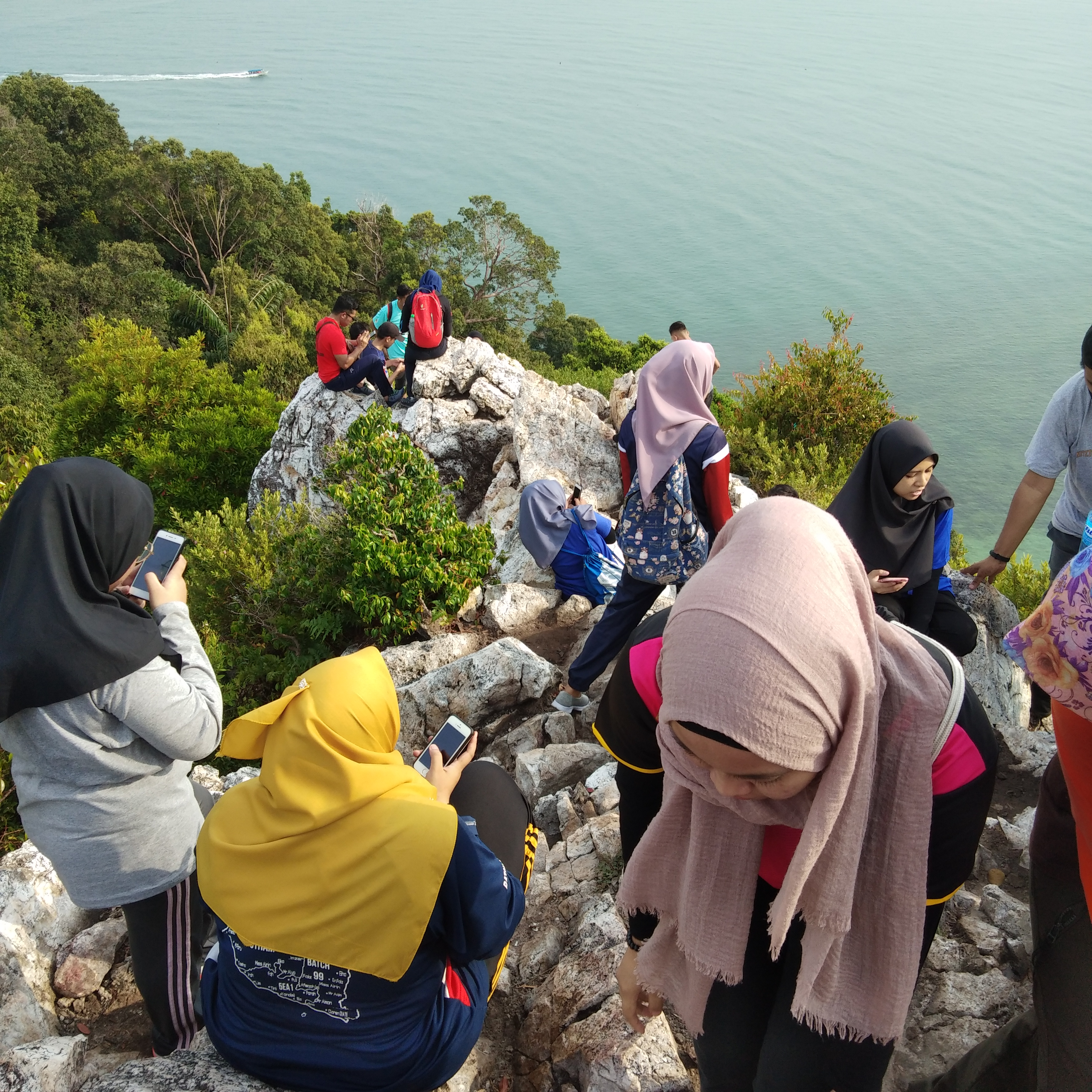
Batu Putih peak is popular among local weekend hikers.

Puncak Batu Putih in Tanjung Tuan is popular for hikers for short hiking experience during the weekend.

Two islets are located at the tip of Tanjung Tuan, Intan Island to the south and Masjid Island to the east.

== Burial place ==
It has also believed that Tanjung Tuan is the place where Parameswara (1344 – c. 1414), the last king of Singapura and the founder of Malacca was buried. Parameswara was succeeded by his son, Megat Iskandar Shah who in turn ruled Malacca until 1424. There is an allegation that Parameswara had also been buried at the Bukit Larangan Park, Singapore. Some others also believe that he could have been cremated based on the Hindu's ritual belief system as people cannot find his actual buried place.

== Gallery ==
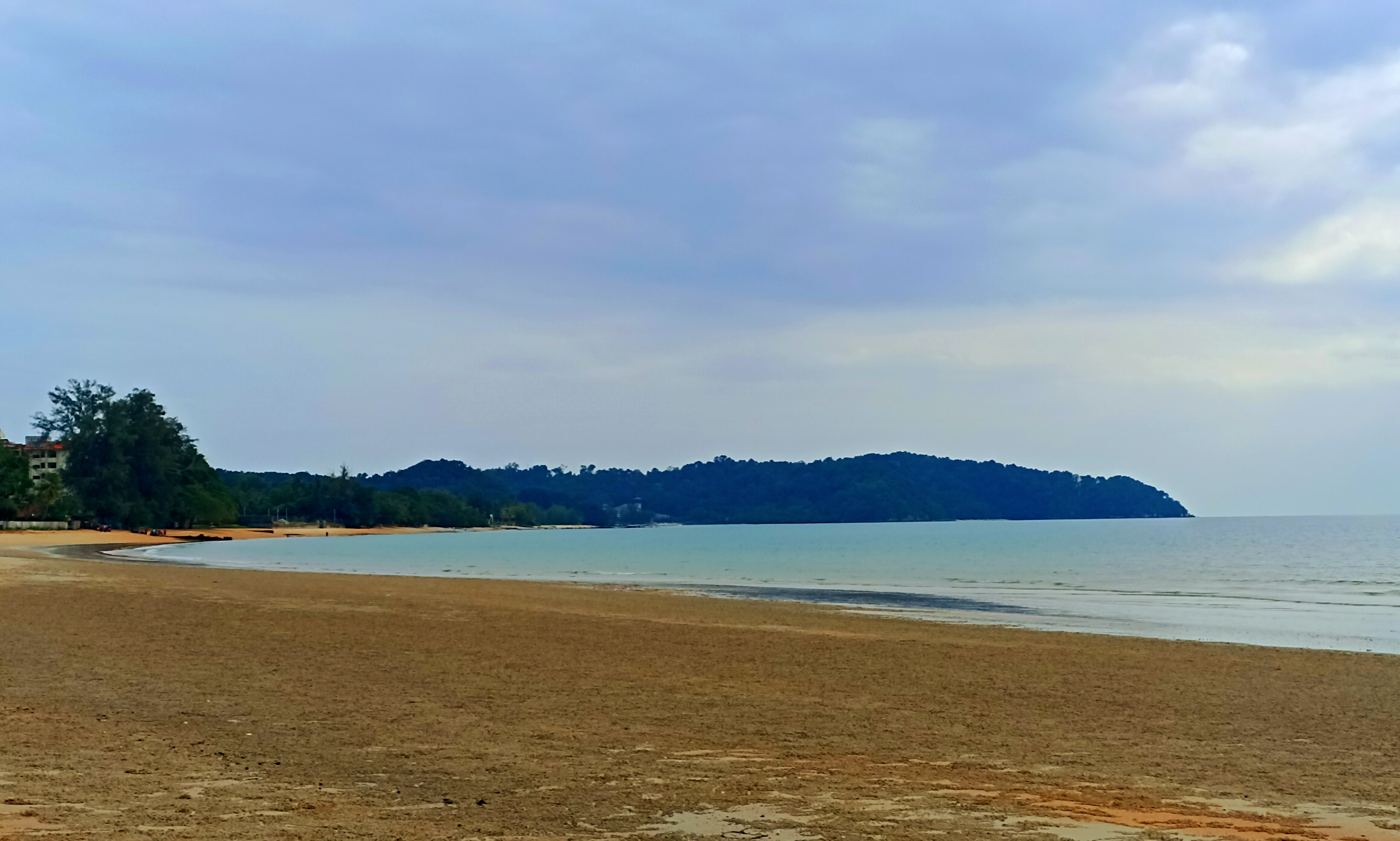
Tanjung Tuan as seen from Teluk Kemang

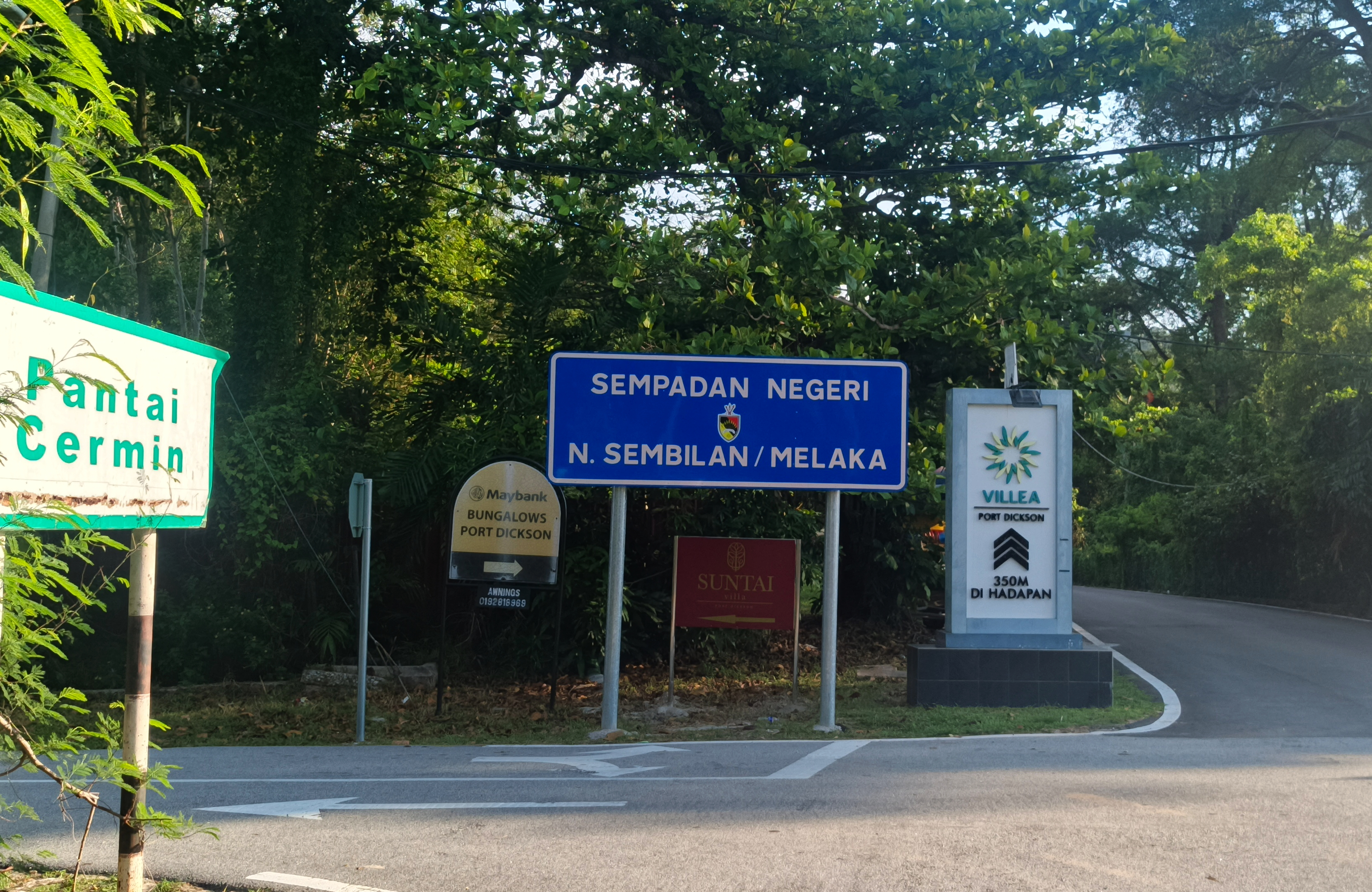
JKR state border signboard

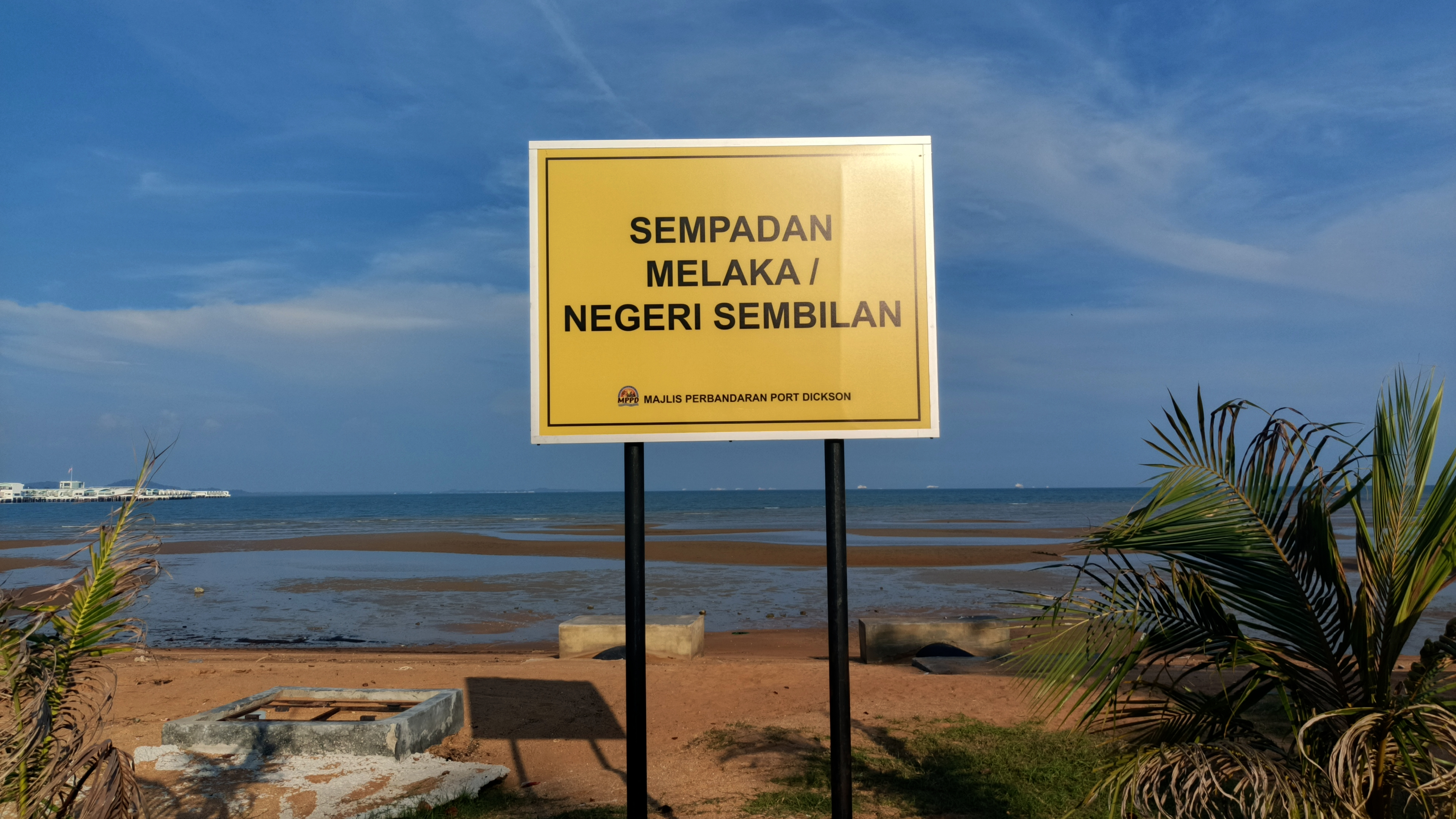
State border signboard installed by the Port Dickson Municipal Council (MPPD) on the other side of the peninsula

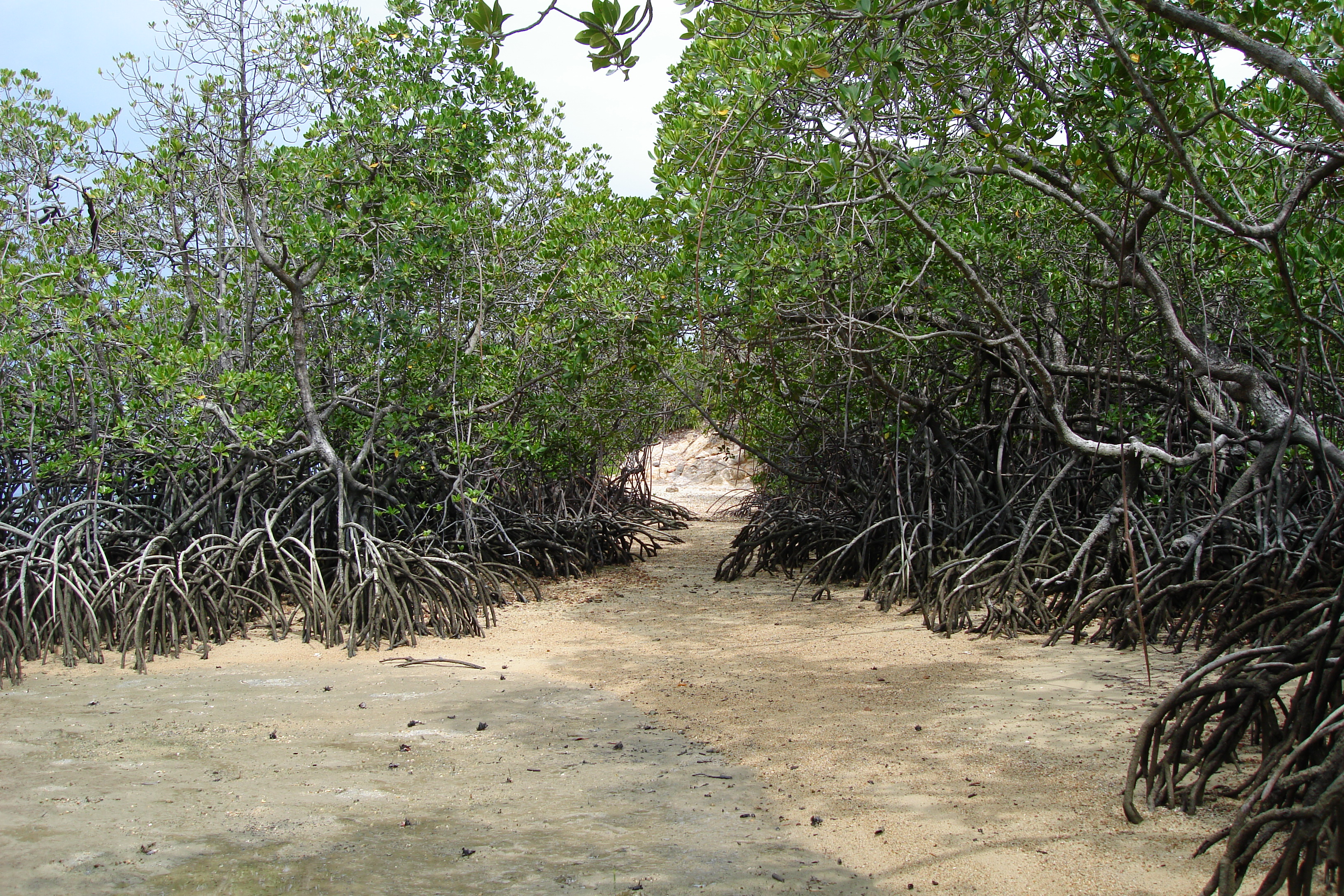
Mangroves along the coastline

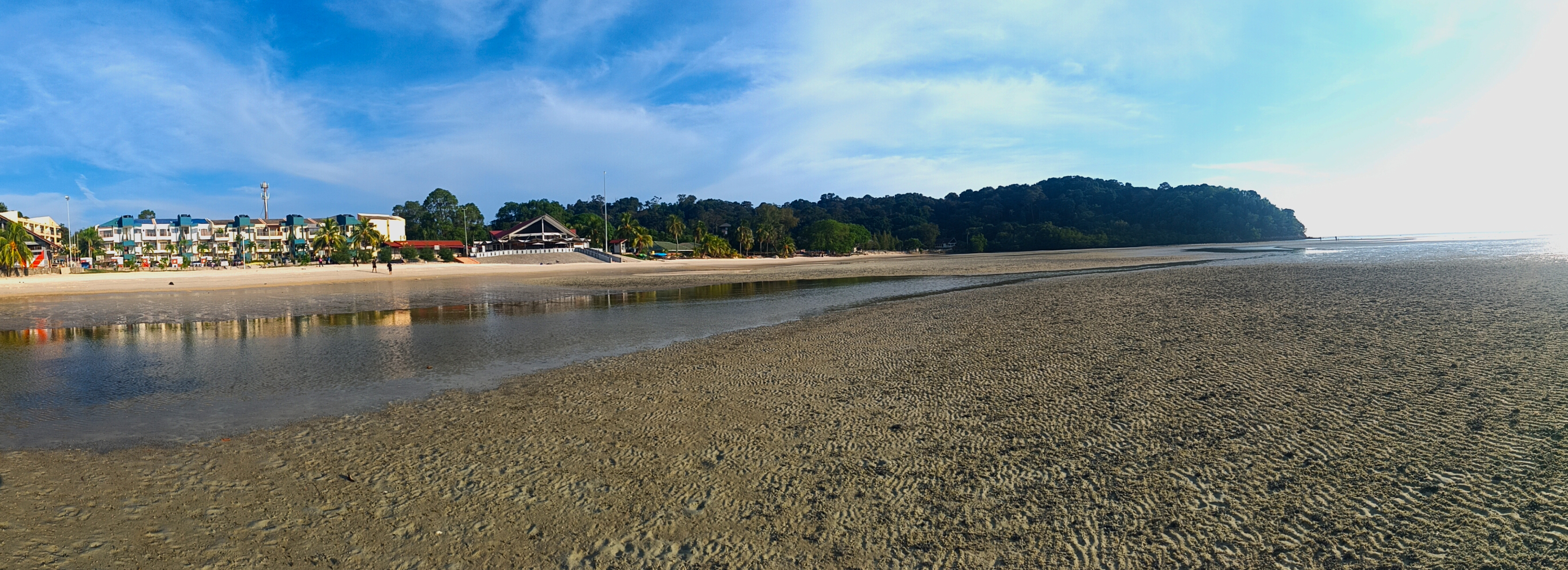
Tanjung Biru beach, shared by both Negeri Sembilan and Malacca

== See also ==
- List of tourist attractions in Malacca

== Notes and references ==
- Malacca State Forestry Department
