= John Anderson (diplomatic writer) =

Scottish diplomatic agent and writer

John Anderson (1795–1845) was a Scottish diplomatic agent and writer on questions of Eastern policy and commerce.

== Biography ==
He was born in Scotland, and presumably in Dumfriesshire, in 1795. Receiving an appointment to the civil service of the East India Company in 1813, he became a 'writer' in Pulo Penang, or Prince of Wales's Island. He was promoted in 1821, when he held the position of deputy-warehousekeeper and Malay translator to the government, to the rank of 'factor,’ and to the discharge of the functions of deputy-accountant, deputy-auditor, accountant to the recorder's court, and commissioner to the Court of Requests; the duties of which offices were continued to him on his preferment, in 1823, to be 'junior merchant.' By various steps he had become, in 1826, accountant and auditor, accountant-general to the recorder's court, superintendent of lawsuits, and Malay translator, and in 1827 attained the dignity of 'senior merchant,’ with the offices of secretary to government and Malay translator. Later in the same year he was made a justice of the peace for Penang, Singapore, and Malacca.

His first publication was a work entitled 'Political and Commercial Considerations relative to the Malayan Peninsula and the British Settlements in the Straits of Malacca,’ Prince of Wales Island, 1824. This work consists of reflections on the Siamese conquest of Quedah and Perak; an exposition of the advantages likely to result from declaring Quedah and the whole of the Malayan states under the protection of the British government; and a descriptive sketch of the tin countries on the western coast of the peninsula of Malacca. In February and March 1823 Anderson had acted as agent to the governor of Pulo Penang for procuring engagements from native potentates in Sumatra, the sultans of Delly and Siack, and the Rajah of Langkat (Sir C. U. Aitchison's Collection of Treaties, Engagements, and Sunnuds relating to India and neighbouring Countries, 8vo, Calcutta, revised edition, vol. i. 1876). Anderson's Sumatran employment bore fruit a few years later in his 'Mission to the East Coast of Sumatra, in 1823, under the direction of the Government of Prince of Wales' Island: including historical and descriptive Sketches of the Country, an Account of the Commerce, Population, and the Manners and Customs of the Inhabitants, and a Visit to the Batta Cannibal States in the Interior,’ 8vo, Edinburgh, 1826.

On his return to Britain in 1830, Anderson entered actively into mercantile and other duties in London, in the course of which he produced a work entitled 'Acheen, and the Ports on the North and East Coasts of Sumatra; with incidental Notices of the Trade in the Eastern Seas, and the Aggressions of the Dutch,’ 8vo, London, 1840. This volume attracted much attention to the state of British commerce in the parts of the world of which it treated. Anderson died, after a short illness, at his house, No. 1 Euston Place, Euston Square, on 2 December 1845, as correctly stated in the 'Gentleman's Magazine' for January 1846 (p. 104). In the first sentence of a more extended notice in the same periodical for the following month (p. 208), he is perplexingly described as 'of Bond Court, Walbrook, and Prince's Place, Kennington,’ and as having died on 15 January 1846, at the age of 75; being unaccountably confounded with Mr. John Adamson, a London merchant of the two specified addresses, whose obituary occurs in the 'Gentleman's Magazine' for March 1846 (p. 329).
