= Peter Flemming =

Canadian television actor

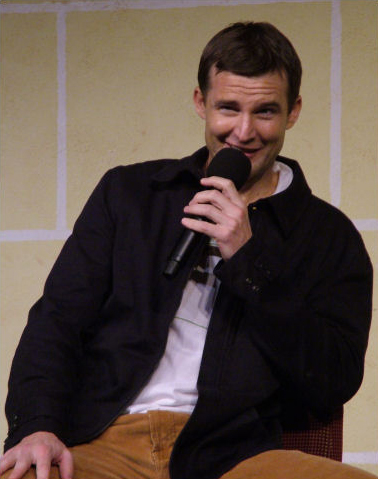
- Flemming in 2006
- Born: 1967 (age 58–59); Halifax, Nova Scotia, Canada
- Occupation: Actor
- Years active: 1993-present
- Known for: Agent Malcolm Barrett in Stargate SG-1 & Stargate: Atlantis

Peter Flemming (born 1967) is a Canadian television actor best known for playing Agent Malcolm Barrett on Stargate SG-1, Stargate Atlantis and Chuck Greene in the Dead Rising video game series.

== Early life ==
Flemming was born in Halifax, Nova Scotia, where he attended Halifax West High School. He wanted to be a gym teacher and competed nationally in a few different sports including curling, golf, hockey. In his early twenties he had done some commercials and TV roles in Halifax while attending university and shortly after moved to Vancouver.

== Career ==
From 2001 he appeared in Stargate SG-1 as Agent Malcolm Barrett. He played in six episodes of Stargate and two episodes in Stargate: Atlantis. He appeared in many other television series like Smallville, The Twilight Zone, Cold Squad, The Outer Limits, and Fringe. In 2010 Flemming played FBI agent Bruce Tanner in a season 3 episode of TV show Sanctuary.

Flemming provided the voice of Chuck Greene, the protagonist of the video game Dead Rising 2. He reprised the role in the game's reimagining Dead Rising 2: Off the Record and its sequel Dead Rising 3.
