= Dead Rising =

Video game series

- Genres: Action-adventure, Satire, Survival Horror
- Developers: Capcom (2006–2009, 2024–present); Tose (2009); Capcom Vancouver (2010–2017); NeoBards Entertainment (2024)
- Publishers: Capcom (2006–present); Microsoft Studios (2010–2017)
- Creator: Keiji Inafune
- Platforms: iOS; PlayStation 3; PlayStation 4; PlayStation 5; Wii; Windows; Xbox 360; Xbox One; Xbox Series X/S
- First release: Dead Rising; August 8, 2006
- Latest release: Dead Rising Deluxe Remaster; September 19, 2024

Dead Rising (Japanese: デッドライジング, Hepburn: Deddo Raijingu) is a series of action-adventure games created by Keiji Inafune. It was originally developed by Capcom in 2006 until Capcom Vancouver took over developing the franchise and Microsoft Studios took over the publishing rights. As of December 31, 2025, the game series has sold 19 million copies worldwide and is currently Capcom's sixth most successful intellectual property.

== Setting ==
The games in the franchise take place in fictional cities, although real cities are mentioned. The first game takes place in a large shopping mall in the town of Willamette, Colorado. The prequel for the second game Case Zero takes place in Still Creek, a small town near Las Vegas, while the main game takes place in Fortune City, a casino mall. The epilogue downloadable content Case West takes place in a Phenotrans facility nearby. The third game takes place in Los Perdidos, California. Dead Rising 4 takes place again in Willamette with a zombie outbreak happening in the Willamette Memorial Megaplex which was constructed to honor the victims of the first game's outbreak.

The setting stems around the misconduct and subterfuge of the American government; whose primary stance in game portrays them as the main antagonist of the series, given the extents they go to bury their involvement with the creation of the zombies. Phenotrans, a multimillion-dollar pharmaceutical company which creates and distributes Zombrex, a medicine that can, if taken daily, prevent an infected person from turning into a zombie, acts and serves as a secondary antagonist in the story. There are also organizations like C.U.R.E. (Citizens for Undead Rights and Equality), which fights for the civil liberties of the zombies, and the ZDC (Zombie Defense and Control), representing an anti-zombie police force to prevent outbreaks.

=== Protagonists ===
- Frank West

Voiced by Terence J. Rotolo (Dead Rising, Dead Rising 2: Case West, Dead Rising 2: Off the Record, Ultimate Marvel vs. Capcom 3, Marvel vs. Capcom: Infinite), Ty Olsson (Dead Rising 4), Peter von Gomm (Tatsunoko vs. Capcom: Ultimate All-Stars), Rikiya Koyama (Ultimate Marvel vs. Capcom 3, Project X Zone), Scott McNeil (Puzzle Fighter), and portrayed by Rob Riggle (Dead Rising: Watchtower).

Frank West is the protagonist of Dead Rising, Dead Rising 2: Off the Record and Dead Rising 4, and is the secondary protagonist of the downloadable expansion Dead Rising 2: Case West. He also appears in the film Dead Rising: Watchtower. Frank West is a freelance photographer and photojournalist who has covered many world events, wars, and other big stories. Looking for the next big scoop, he stumbles onto some strange events happening in the small town of Willamette, Colorado. While not the most polished and professional person in his field, he is strong, genuinely kind and decent, and always operates on instinct. Frank is capable of handling himself in combat and helping other survivors to safety.

In his non-canonical appearances, Frank West is the main protagonist of the remakes Dead Rising: Chop till you Drop (Wii remake of the original Dead Rising) and Dead Rising 2: Off the Record (remake of the second game), as well as of the mobile game, and he is also a playable character in Super Ultra Dead Rising 3′ Arcade Remix Hyper Edition EX Plus Alpha.

- Chuck Greene

Voiced by Peter Flemming and portrayed by Victor Webster (Dead Rising: Endgame).

The protagonist of Dead Rising 2 and all of its downloadable contents as well as a supporting character in Dead Rising 3, and having a cameo in the film Dead Rising: Endgame. Chuck is introduced in Dead Rising 2 as a former motocross champion and an extremely resourceful mechanic, able to repair and construct anything he can imagine. Chuck arrives at Fortune City, Nevada, to take part in Terror Is Reality, a controversial sports entertainment game show where contestants kill zombies for cash prizes. Chuck wants the prize to have money to buy an expensive medicine called Zombrex, which only if taken daily is able to suppresses the zombification process of his daughter Katey, who was bitten by her zombified mother during a previous outbreak in Las Vegas.

In his non-canonical appearances, the co-op player of Dead Rising 2: Off the Record always controls Chuck, within the same game a second Chuck appears as a psychopath having gone crazy after the death of his daughter, Chuck is also playable in the downloadable content Super Ultra Dead Rising 3′ Arcade Remix Hyper Edition EX Plus Alpha.

- Nick Ramos

Voiced by Andrew Lawrence. The protagonist of Dead Rising 3. Nick is an orphan-turned-mechanic who works for Wrench O' Rama in the city of Los Perdidos. While he has excellent mechanical skills, Nick has difficulties formulating plans and acting under pressure. Many details of his life remain a mystery, but a distinctive physical trait is a tattoo of the number 12 on his neck (This is later revealed that he is one of the test subjects of Carlito in the Santa Cabeza outbreak, along with his friend Diego. And his blood contained the cure for the zombie infection). Despite his shortcomings, Nick is a friendly young man who holds his friends in high regard, especially his boss Rhonda, who is about the closest thing he knows to a mother. Nick also has a crush on a girl named Annie. The co-op player of Dead Rising 3 controls a character called Dick.

- Chase Carter

Chase Carter is the protagonist of the films Dead Rising: Watchtower and Dead Rising: Endgame. The character is also a journalist.

== Games ==
Aggregate review scores
Game	Metacritic
Dead Rising	(X360) 85 (PS4) 78
Dead Rising 2	(PS4) 82 (PS3) 80 (X360) 79 (PC) 78
Dead Rising 2: Off the Record	(PS3) 72 (X360) 72 (PC) 66
Dead Rising 3	(XONE) 78 (PC) 70
Dead Rising 4	(PC) 74 (XONE) 72 (PS4) 71

=== Main series ===
Release timeline
2006	Dead Rising
2007	Dead Rising Java
2008
2009	Dead Rising: Chop Till You Drop
2010	Case Zero
2010	Dead Rising 2
2010	Dead Rising Mobile
2010	Case West
2011	Shot by Frank
2011	Dead Rising 2: Off the Record
2012	Dead Rising: The Survival
2013	Dead Rising 3
2014–2015
2016	Dead Rising 4
2017–2023
2024	Dead Rising: Deluxe Remaster

The game displays the health bar, the level, the number of zombies killed, depleting bars telling how much time until each mission becomes unavailable, and the current item (which turns red when the weapon is about to break). The games work within a 72-hour schedule which happens in an in-game time, every event happens within a specific hour. The story happens within a city infected by hordes of zombies and various hostile survivors, and each subsequent game has allowed for more zombies to be displayed on screen, at the same time.

The melee combat system consists of using everything as a weapon, most of the items in the game can be used, as some weapons are very effective, but others are comedically inefficient, in addition weapons constantly break forcing the player to constantly use different weapons. Dead Rising 2 introduced a "Combo Weapons" system, where the player can combine certain items into more powerful weapons, some of which are over-the-top, such as a lightsaber, made by combining a flashlight with jewelry. Dead Rising 3 enhanced the mechanic by introducing "Combo Vehicles" allowing players to combine items with vehicles and even vehicles with other vehicles to make more powerful vehicles, for instance a motorcycle with a chainsaw creates the "slicecycle", a motorcycle with two chainsaws at the sides.

Players can level up by performing mission objectives, which consist of progressing on the main story, rescuing and leading survivors to safety by guiding them to the safe house, and also fighting psychopaths whom are civilians who either have become criminally insane after the zombie outbreak or are taking advantage of it for their own purposes. Leveling up increases the health bar, walking speed, unlocks melee combos, and reveals weapon combinations. Customization allows the player to use different clothes, spread all around the mall, which vary from a sports fan attire, to pajamas, to dresses, to a male stripper outfit, to a Mega Man cosplay.

All games feature multiple endings, completing all the missions in the main story is the only way to get the true ending. Since the second game, all games except for Dead Rising 4 feature two player co-op online multiplayer in the story mode, with the fourth main game only including a competitive multiplayer mode.

==== Dead Rising (2006) ====
The first game in the Dead Rising series. The game centers on Frank West, a photojournalist who ends up trapped in a shopping mall in the fictional town of Willamette, Colorado, that is infested with zombies. Players can use everything as a weapon. The game story works in a 72-hour clock, with another in-universe 24 hour post game chapter. In total, there are six endings, titled F through A, with Ending A being the only one to unlock the aforementioned post-game; rendering it the game's canon finale.

==== Dead Rising 2 (2010) ====
The second game in the Dead Rising series. Set in the fictional casino town of Fortune City, Nevada, five years after the events of Dead Rising, the game follows former motocross champion Chuck Greene trying to clear his name after being framed for starting the outbreak in Fortune City, while simultaneously trying to keep his daughter alive with a drug called Zombrex that prevents an infected individual from turning into a zombie. The "72-hour" system returns. The major gameplay improvement over its predecessor is the Combo Weapons system, allowing Chuck to combine certain items by using crafting tables. In addition survivors AI was also improved. The Main story can be played in 2 player online co-op, with the second player controlling a second Chuck. Players can earn money by playing the online multiplayer mode "Terror is Reality".

- Standalone downloadable games: two downloadable standalone expansions were released for the game, for Xbox 360. Since March 2017, both are backwards compatible with Xbox One, although unlike the main game, none of the expansions were remastered.: The first Case Zero (2010): Released a month before the main game, Dead Rising 2: Case Zero serves as a prologue and "demo" to the main game. Set a few years before Dead Rising 2, Chuck Greene is stranded in a small town named Still Creek and has to fight his way out with his daughter Katey. While the second, Case West (2010): The downloadable content serves as an epilogue for Dead Rising 2, Chuck with the help of Frank West, go to a Phenotrans facility to get evidence to clear Chuck's name.

==== Dead Rising 3 (2013) ====
The third game in the Dead Rising series. Set ten years after Dead Rising 2, the story follows a young mechanic named Nick Ramos and his attempt to survive a massive zombie outbreak in the fictional city of Los Perdidos, California. The time system returns. Combo Weapons can be fused anywhere, as crafting tables were removed, and the crafting system was also expanded by introducing "Combo-Vehicles". While there is no sandbox mode, like in "Off the Record", similar challenges can be found during the Story Mode. Survivors were upgraded to be able to use "Combo Weapons". Like in the previous game, the main story can be played in 2 player Co-op Online Mode where the second player controls a character named Dick.

- Downloadable content: There are 5 downloadable content packs, the first 4 are known as Untold Stories of Los Perdidos. Each one focuses on exploring the zombie outbreak in Los Perdidos depicted in the main story, through the point of view of a different survivor, whom Nick met during the main story. The first, Operation Broken Eagle, is the story of Adam Kane, a psychopath that is a Special Forces Commander on a mission to capture the president, (whom Nick kills in the main story). The second Fallen Angel, is the story of Angel Quijano, an illegally infected survivor. She appears in the main story as part of Annie's group of survivors. The third Chaos Rising, tells the story of Hunter Thibodeaux, a biker seeking revenge on the people who incarcerated him. He is a psychopath, whom Nick kills using a molotov cocktail in the main story. And the fourth The Last Agent, is the story of Brad Park, a ZDC agent searching for the truth about the outbreak. Brad also appears in the side missions played through the Smart Glass companion application and returns as a supporting character in Dead Rising 4. The fifth expansion is the non-canon Super Ultra Dead Rising 3′ Arcade Remix Hyper Edition EX Plus Alpha. It focuses on beat 'em up action with four-player co-op, in it players can control Frank West, Chuck Greene, Katey "Annie" Greene and Nick Ramos, it also features exclusive costumes which serve as an homage to other Capcom franchises.

==== Dead Rising 4 (2016) ====
The fourth game in the Dead Rising series. Set one year after Dead Rising 3, the game features an older Frank West, returning to Willamette, Colorado during the Christmas season, where the newly constructed "Willamette Memorial Megaplex" has fallen under another zombie outbreak. "Combo Weapons" and "Combo Vehicles" return, and camera mechanics from "Dead Rising 2: Off the Record" also return improved. The game introduces an exo-suit. Unlike previous games, the 72-hour timer system has been dropped, to encourage exploration. The main story does not support online cooperative multiplayer, making it a single player experience like in the original game. To address player complaints of the game being too easy, a month after its release Capcom released an update which added the much requested Hard and Ultra-Hard difficulties, in which the items break more easily and the food restores less health, bringing the difficulty closer to that of the previous games, five new Street Fighter themed costumes were also included within the update. A further update was released on December 5, upgrading the game with a new game mode called Capcom Heroes, the new mode allows Frank to don 17 new outfits based on Capcom's video game franchises, each with their own moveset.

There is four player cooperative play, but it does not feature Frank West, as it features four characters from the main story and the cooperative mode is separate from the story. The cooperative mode has the player completing various tasks in the Willamette Memorial Megaplex, while working as a team, and earning scores by doing various tasks (e.g. kill zombies, plant bombs, etc.). The player must survive until 9 pm that night and make it back to the safe room.

- Downloadable content: Three add-ons were confirmed within the game's season pass: the Stocking Stuffer Holiday Pack only added holiday themed weapons, while the multiplayer Super Ultra Dead Rising 4 Mini Golf added a mini golf multiplayer mode. Released in April 2017, the third and sole story DLC titled Frank Rising, continued the story after the end of the main game, picking up right after its ending, with an infected Frank West, trying to prevent his own zombification and helping survivors. The gameplay saw the return of the timer mechanic and have a higher difficulty than that of the main game.

=== Remakes ===
==== Dead Rising: Chop Till You Drop (2009) ====
A reimagining of the original Dead Rising for the Wii. This version was built with the same engine used for the Resident Evil 4 Wii Edition. While still set in a mall and able to save survivors, there is a greater emphasis on firearms and the game is structured around individual timed missions instead of free roam. Various elements were tailored to the Wii's weaker hardware or limitations of the different engine. These included smaller maps, reduced enemy counts and the removal of the photo system, but new enemy types were added.

==== Dead Rising 2: Off the Record (2011) ====
A non-canonical remake of Dead Rising 2, which replaces protagonist Chuck Greene, with Frank West (the protagonist of the original game), and also features some slight plot alterations. Fortune City remains mostly the same, but now adds a new place, a small alien thematic park called "Uranus Zone". The "72-hour" system returns, but the game also adds a "Sandbox Mode", where Frank can explore Fortune City without a time limit, and also complete challenges which require the players to use their creativity and crafting the necessary weapons to succeed. More Combo Weapons were added. Camera mechanics from Dead Rising also returned improved. Both the main story and the sandbox mode can be played in two player co-operative online mode, with the second player controlling Chuck.

==== Dead Rising: Deluxe Remaster (2024) ====
A remake of Dead Rising was announced on June 26th, 2024. It was released digitally on September 18th 2024 on Xbox Series X and S, PlayStation 5, and Microsoft Windows with a physical release in November 2024.

=== Re-release compilations ===
==== Dead Rising Collection (2014) ====
Dead Rising Collection is a compilation for Xbox 360 containing the games from the Dead Rising franchise released on Xbox 360: Dead Rising, Dead Rising 2 and its downloadable content Case Zero and Case West, and Dead Rising 2: Off the Record. It was released exclusively in Europe on March 7, 2014.

==== Dead Rising Triple Pack (2016) ====
Triple Pack is a compilation pack featuring the original Dead Rising, Dead Rising 2, and Dead Rising 2: Off the Record. It was released for PlayStation 4 and Xbox One on September 13, 2016. Physical copies of the first two games were released on September 13, 2016, and September 27, 2016 (North America only) respectively. The ports themselves were praised; but the collection was criticized for not including Dead Rising 2 expansions Case Zero and Case West. Each game includes all of its DLC costumes.

=== Mobile game ===
==== Dead Rising Mobile (2010) ====
A spin-off was released on iOS on December 9, 2010. It received negative reviews.

=== Canceled sequel ===
An investigation into the series by game journalist Liam Robertson revealed that a fifth game in the series, Dead Rising 5, was being developed at Capcom Vancouver between 2016 and 2018 for Windows and Xbox One. The game was planned to be set between the events of Dead Rising 2 and 3, and would have focused on Chuck and Katey Greene who are caught in the middle of a zombie outbreak in a fictional Mexican city during the Day of the Dead. The project entered early development alongside Dead Rising 4 and was canceled when Capcom Vancouver was closed in September 2018.

== Films ==
=== Zombrex: Dead Rising Sun ===
In 2010, a Japanese film based on the Dead Rising universe titled Zombrex: Dead Rising Sun was released directed by Keiji Inafune. The film featured a new cast of characters set in the same world as Dead Rising.

=== Dead Rising: Watchtower (2015) ===
Legendary Digital Media released a digital feature film titled Dead Rising: Watchtower directed by Zach Lipovsky. Crackle had the initial U.S. rights of the film and while it was internationally distributed by Content Media Corp.

The film stars Jesse Metcalfe, Dennis Haysbert, Virginia Madsen, Meghan Ory, Harley Morenstein, Aleks Paunovic, Keegan Connor Tracy and Carrie Genzel with Rob Riggle as Frank West. The film takes place between Dead Rising 2 and Dead Rising 3.

=== Dead Rising: Endgame (2016) ===
The sequel, Dead Rising: Endgame was released on Crackle in 2016 with Metcalfe, Haysbert and Tracy returning for their roles from the previous film, with Victor Webster as Dead Rising 2 hero Chuck Greene, and Billy Zane, Marie Avgeropoulos, Ian Tracey, Jessica Harmon, Camille Sullivan as new characters. The film takes place between Dead Rising: Watchtower and Dead Rising 3.

== In other games ==
Frank West is a playable character in the fighting games Tatsunoko vs. Capcom: Ultimate All-Stars, Ultimate Marvel vs. Capcom 3 and Marvel vs. Capcom: Infinite, with his special moves revolving around the use of zombies and the makeshift weapons from Dead Rising. He has special dialogue with Nova, the Hulk, and Spider-Man, the latter of which he tries to compete with as a rival photographer. Frank also appears as one of the characters at player's disposal in the tactical role-playing game Project X Zone, where he is paired with Hsien-Ko from the Darkstalkers series. Frank West also appears as a multiplayer character in Capcom's Lost Planet: Extreme Condition, and in the sequel, Lost Planet 2.

In Valve's add-on content "The Passing" for Left 4 Dead 2, a message from Frank directed to Otis appears among other pop culture messages graffitied on the wall of a bar.

Frank & Chuck appeared as playable characters in the discontinued mobile game Puzzle Fighter which was also developed by Capcom Vancouver.

In April 2021, the Dead Rising franchise was introduced to Teppen alongside Ace Attorney with the "Ace vs. The People" expansion.
