= Dead Rising: Chop Till You Drop =

2009 video game

- North American cover art
- Developer: Tose
- Publisher: Capcom
- Producer: Minoru Nakai
- Series: Dead Rising
- Platform: Wii
- Release: JP: February 19, 2009; NA: February 24, 2009; AU: February 26, 2009; EU: February 27, 2009
- Genre: Action-adventure
- Mode: Single-player

Dead Rising: Chop Till You Drop (Note: Japanese: デッドライジング ゾンビのいけにえ, Hepburn: Deddo Raijingu: Zonbi no Ikenie) is an action-adventure game developed by Tose and published by Capcom for the Wii. It was released in February 2009. The game is a port of the original Xbox 360 version of Dead Rising, and is currently the only game of the series for a Nintendo platform. The game was created following Capcom's success with the Wii version of Resident Evil 4.

The plot of the game is the same as the original. Players control Frank West, a photojournalist seeking to discover the truth behind a zombie outbreak in the fictional town of Willamette, Colorado, exploring the town's shopping mall to find answers while dealing with hordes of zombies and crazed survivors. The game had a number of changes from the original console versions, which received mixed feedback from reviewers.

== Gameplay ==
Although gameplay is similar to the original, there are notable differences in the Wii version. The first is that Frank now operates out of the mall's security room, and he advances the main plot by completing missions given to him by Otis, Brad, and Jessie; other missions see him rescuing various survivors of the outbreak. While players do not have a single countdown clock for the main story, missions are individually timed and Frank is not permitted to roam freely around the mall when on a mission. Another notable difference is a greater emphasis on gun-based gameplay than the original. Firearms are a completely redefined element—not only do guns now have more ammunition, players now use an over-the-shoulder perspective to aim using the Wii Remote to set where the gun is pointing.

Other differences between the two versions include:

- A few of the psychopaths from the original appear as zombies in the Wii version, while some of the survivors of the original are absent.
- The Wii version features zombified animals, including poodles and parrots.
- The mall is significantly smaller in the Wii version.
- Frank cannot jump in the Wii version, and the photography system is absent.
- Players can change the color of the blood in the game.
- 72-Hour Mode and Overtime Mode are merged in the Wii Version, to form a single, story-driven mode of gameplay.
- Completing the main storyline on the Wii version grants the player access to a range of minigames.
- There are fewer items scattered around the mall that can be used as weapons.
- Cletus now sells guns to you for money instead of dying as in the original game
- In the Wii version, all of the firearms were replaced with Resident Evil 4 guns, including the Blacktail, Killer 7, and Red-9; the original guns are absent.

== Development ==
On July 15, 2008, Famitsu revealed that Dead Rising was in the process of being ported by Capcom for the Wii console, with plans for a release date in February 2009. It was later revealed that the port would be subtitled Chop Till You Drop, and in Japan Zombie no Ikenie. Capcom’s decision to make a Wii version of the game came after the company ported over Resident Evil 4 for the Wii, and found it to be critically and commercially well received. Although the team working on the Dead Rising port used the same engine as in the Wii version of Resident Evil 4, their work was constrained by the budget and limited time, and with the Wii's more limited graphical capabilities compared to the Xbox 360. While they attempted to retain as many features of the original as possible, they were forced to remove the photography system and limit the number of zombies that appeared on-screen to 100, around one eighth the amount that the original version could handle. Another major change was the implementation of more structured gameplay through a mission mechanic introduced in the Wii version.

Capcom involved THQ in Australia with the game's development, announcing that it expected to sell around 500,000 copies of the Wii version upon its launch.

== Reception ==
Reception

Aggregate scores
| Aggregator | Score |
|---|---|
| GameRankings | 61.19% |
| Metacritic | 61/100 |

Review scores
| Publication | Score |
|---|---|
| 1Up.com | C+ |
| Eurogamer | 6/10 |
| G4 | 2/5 |
| GamePro | 3.5/5 |
| GameSpot | 6.5/10 |
| GameTrailers | 6.9/10 |
| GameZone | 6/10 |
| IGN | 6.9/10 |
| Official Nintendo Magazine | 6.8/10 |

Chop Till You Drop received mixed reviews following its launch. While Metacritic gave the game an average score of 61/100, X-Play gave it 2 out of 5 stars, criticising some of the changes, the control choices, and the odd assortment of minigames, but praising it for using the Wii Remote for aiming ranged weapons, considering the game mechanic to be a vast improvement upon the original version. GameSpot gave the game 6.5/10, praising the gunplay by commenting that it was "hard but satisfying" and noting that the Wii version was just the "same zombie-bashing fun as the original". IGN, who gave the game 6.9/10, were critical of the graphics and other factors, stating "obviously, Dead Rising had to take a hit in the transition from 360 to Wii. But this isn't even good looking for the Wii, really. The story and dialogue are wretched, and a key feature (the ability to take photographs) has been inexplicably removed."
