= Puzzle Fighter (2017 video game) =

2017 video game

- Developer: Capcom Vancouver
- Publisher: Capcom
- Composer: Traz Damji
- Platforms: iOS, Android
- Release: WW: November 22, 2017
- Genres: Tile-matching, fighting
- Modes: Single player, multiplayer

Puzzle Fighter was a free-to-play competitive puzzle video game for Android and iOS devices, which is developed by Capcom Vancouver and published by Capcom. It was the successor to 1996's Super Puzzle Fighter II Turbo, and features playable characters from various Capcom franchises. The game launched in November 2017 and was discontinued in July 2018.

== Gameplay ==
Based on the 1997 arcade title Super Puzzle Fighter II Turbo, Puzzle Fighter was a competitive puzzle game in which players fight against each other using characters from Street Fighter and other Capcom franchises such as Darkstalkers, Dead Rising and Mega Man. Each player used one main character and can also equip two backup characters who can perform support actions. During gameplay, colored gems drop down from the top of the grid and can be rotated and placed by the player. By connecting multiple gems of the same color together into square or rectangle formations, they could merge into larger gems. Players attacked their opponent and clear their grid by using Crash Gems, which destroy all connected gems of the same color upon contact. Successful crashes deals damage to the opponent and sends them Counter Gems, which turn into regular Gems after the timer counts down unless a Crash is made next to them. More damage can be done by either crashing larger gems or performing chains of successive crashes. Additionally, there were diamonds that destroy all gems of the color it lands on. Unique to this version was the Super Gauge, which can be built up with successful crashes or by placing the diamond on an empty space on the floor. When the gauge was full, players could perform a powerful Super Attack with their character. Extra damage is dealt to the player if they became overstacked and cannot place any more gems down, although this does not instantly defeat them like in the original game. Players won by reducing their opponent's health to zero.

The game was divided into two modes of play; Online Matches against human opponents through an internet connection, and Missions against computer opponents. By playing through each mode, players receive one of three main kinds of rewards; coins, gems, and skill cards, as well as additional characters and costumes. Coins and skill cards were used to increase each character's abilities, such as special moves that trigger when certain patterns are crashed. When players had enough skill cards and coins, they could upgrade these abilities, which also increased the character's experience and raised their level, making them more powerful. Gems served as the main in-game currency, allowing players to purchase certain items or skip wait times, and additional gems could be purchased with real money.

== Characters ==
The following characters were released up to the point of discontinuation.

- Ryu (Street Fighter)
- Ken Masters (Street Fighter)
- Chun-Li (Street Fighter)
- E. Honda (Street Fighter)
- Blanka (Street Fighter)
- M. Bison (Street Fighter)
- Nash (Street Fighter)
- Dan Hibiki (Street Fighter)
- Mike Haggar (Final Fight)
- Frank West (Dead Rising)
- Chuck Greene (Dead Rising)
- Morrigan Aensland (Darkstalkers)
- Jill Valentine (Resident Evil)
- X (Mega Man X)
- Servbot (Mega Man Legends)
- Dr. Wily (Mega Man)
- Dante (Devil May Cry)
- Viewtiful Joe (Viewtiful Joe)
- Phoenix Wright (Ace Attorney)
- Devilotte de Death Satan IX (Cyberbots: Full Metal Madness)
- Alastor (Viewtiful Joe)
- Regina (Dino Crisis)
- Ada Wong (Resident Evil)

== Reception ==
=== Critical ===
Reception

Aggregate score
| Aggregator | Score |
|---|---|
| Metacritic | 64/100 |

Review scores
| Publication | Score |
|---|---|
| Destructoid | 7.5/10 |
| Gamezebo | 3/5 |
| Pocket Gamer | 2.5/5 |

Puzzle Fighter received "mixed or average reviews" from critics, according to review aggregator Metacritic. Pocket Gamer said that it was "a grind-filled, boring" game, while Gamezebo summarised it as "You'll enjoy moments of Puzzle Fighter but it's rarely enough, and it's certainly not enough to make you want to throw money at the situation. The basic formula might be correct, but, ultimately, Puzzle Fighter feels a little lazy at heart."

=== Downloads ===
The Android version had been installed 500,000 times.

== Shutdown ==
Capcom announced on April 20, 2018 that they would be sunsetting the game. Players received 10,000 gems for free, and in-game purchases were disabled on April 23. The game was delisted from stores on July 1, 2018, and it shut down on July 31.
