= Dead Rising 3 =

2013 video game

- Developer: Capcom Vancouver (Note: Additional work, development support, and co-developed by Microsoft Studios)
- Publishers: Microsoft Studios; Capcom (Windows)
- Producers: Jon Airhart; Michel Jones
- Designers: Brent Arnst; Roy McCombe
- Programmer: Adrian Cheung
- Artist: Alan Jarvie
- Writer: Annie Reid
- Composer: Oleksa Lozowchuk
- Series: Dead Rising
- Platforms: Xbox One; Windows
- Release: Xbox One; November 22, 2013; Windows; September 5, 2014
- Genre: Action-adventure
- Modes: Single-player, multiplayer

Dead Rising 3 is a 2013 action-adventure game developed by Capcom Vancouver and published by Microsoft Studios. The game was released as a launch title for the Xbox One platform on November 22, 2013; a Windows port published by Capcom was released on September 5, 2014.

Dead Rising 3 gained mostly positive reviews from critics who praised its gameplay and visuals, but criticized its changes to the gameplay, art direction, story, characters, and technical issues.

== Gameplay ==
Following in the footsteps of previous installments, players control new protagonist Nick Ramos in third person. Players' primary focus is to search for supplies and weapons in order to fight many undead and complete missions. Dead Rising 3 is set in a vast, open world environment which is much larger than the worlds of Dead Rising and Dead Rising 2 combined. The game can render three times as many zombies on-screen at once as its predecessor. Players can save their progress anywhere, as opposed to limiting saves to toilets. The game includes a "Nightmare Mode" for those who would prefer the traditional time limit and save options. The game does not have load times.

Dead Rising 3 expands upon the crafting system introduced in Dead Rising 2. Players retain the ability to create "combo weapons", but without the need for a workbench, allowing them to craft weapons on the fly. Dead Rising 3 also allows players to create "combo vehicles", such as combining a motorcycle and steamroller to form a "RollerHawg". Each combo vehicle includes two seats and a secondary blue attack to support cooperative gameplay. Driving vehicles are a part of exploration, as players navigate the city of Los Perdidos. Players are able to discover and unlock blueprints for new combo weapons and vehicles.

Dead Rising 3 utilizes both the Kinect and Xbox SmartGlass. The optional Kinect feature gives zombies a certain level of situational awareness. Loud noises from the player could potentially trigger a rush of zombies; however, the player can also use the ability to shout at zombies through the Kinect in order to distract them. The microphone sensitivity is tuned to "a threshold that makes sense," so that attracting zombies will feel like an intentional decision. The Xbox SmartGlass feature, which is also optional, can be used to locate specific items, find abandoned storefronts, and set waypoints for mission objectives. It also provides players with exclusive missions that unlock apps within the SmartGlass, giving them the ability to call in airstrikes, drone support, or area-wide flares for fending off or drawing the attention of the undead.

=== Multiplayer ===
Dead Rising 3 offers two-player cooperative gameplay. Co-op play is accessible in all game modes with the exception of an explicit single player mode. In all other modes (Casual, Completionist, Speed Run, Hardcore), players may be paired with a second player seamlessly at any time should a match be found. Alternatively, players can directly select to play Multiplayer.

The primary player continues as Nick Ramos while the secondary player (who would have selected "Multiplayer" in the menus) assumes the role of Dick, a trucker who survives the outbreak. The two players can explore the entire map and complete side missions separately, but main story missions must be completed together. Any blueprints and collectibles found or completed challenges count for both players. On June 9, 2014, Capcom announced a new DLC known as Super Ultra Dead Rising 3′ Arcade Remix Hyper Edition EX Plus Alpha at the Microsoft Press Conference at E3 2014, which features four-player co-op.

== Plot ==
Dead Rising 3 takes place in 2021, 10 years after the events of the Fortune City outbreak and 15 years after the Willamette outbreak. The story follows a young mechanic named Nick Ramos and his attempt to survive a massive zombie outbreak in the fictional city of Los Perdidos, California. The game begins three days after the initial outbreak. After returning from a failed search for supplies, Nick reunites with some other survivors at a diner including his boss Rhonda, a girl named Annie, a trucker named Dick, a man named Peter and his mother. After the zombies break into the diner and kill Peter and his mother, Annie runs back to her own group of survivors. Nick and the others make it to Rhonda's auto shop and learn that the government is going to bomb the city in six days to stop the outbreak. The group drives to a military checkpoint, only to find everyone there dead and be ambushed by a rogue biker gang.

After defeating the bikers, Nick reunites with his old friend Diego, who is now a soldier, and learns from him that there is a plane at the old museum in town that can be fixed up and used to escape the city before it is destroyed. However, before starting to work on the plane, Nick is bitten by a zombie and heads to the crematorium in town to search for some Zombrex, meeting a man called Gary on the way, who is looking for a certain girl under orders from his boss. Unable to find any Zombrex, Nick loses all hope until Gary notices that his wound has healed, revealing that he is somehow immune from turning. Realizing that the girl Gary is looking for is actually Annie, Nick agrees to help him retrieve her in exchange for fuel for the plane. Nick then tracks her down but fails to convince her to come with him. The leader of her group, Red, tells Nick that the military is in fact not evacuating survivors but killing them off instead, and Nick agrees to help them in exchange for the fuel he needs. After retrieving some evidence of the military's crimes, Nick learns from Red that all of his friends, including Annie, were captured by them.

While infiltrating a military encampment to rescue the captives, Nick learns that government officials General Hemlock and Marion Mallon are responsible for the outbreak and witness them turning the U.S. President into a zombie as well to assume full control of the government. After rescuing the captives, Nick learns that the government is offering five million dollars as a reward for anyone who captures certain individuals with numbers tattooed on their neck, like him and Diego. Having finally obtained the fuel from Red, Nick returns to Rhonda and Dick only to find out that a deranged Diego has fled. Nick confronts him at the museum and has him return to his senses. After retrieving parts for the plane Nick learns from Rhonda that she is not going with them because she wants to stay and attempt to reconcile with her ex-husband. Nick then leaves to round up the other survivors but he and Diego are captured by the military. Nick awakens in a room, restrained next to Diego, who is killed in front of him, and the hundreds of parasitic wasps and larvae swarming out of his body create a confusion that allows him to escape, meeting Isabella Keyes on the way, who reveals that he is the one the military is looking for because of his immunity. After surviving an attack from Mallon, Nick discovers that Gary had captured Annie and he refuses to let her go. However, upon learning that Gary is actually Rhonda's ex-husband, Nick have the two reunited in order to rescue her.

Once reunited with the others, Nick learns from Isabella that he, Diego and other orphans born from U.S. soldiers stationed in Santa Cabeza were experimented upon by her brother Carlito in order to become live biological weapons, with each of them carrying the parasite. However, Nick is immune to it instead, and he must leave the town alive in order to have a cure developed. Interested in the reward for Nick, Red turns on the group and fights him. After Red is killed, Nick uses a transceiver, and pretending to be a military agent, tells Hemlock that they need more time to apprehend him. The general agrees, extending the time before the bomb deployment by an extra day. Nick and Annie end up kissing. Soon after, Chuck Greene arrives with Rhonda and Gary, revealing that Annie is actually his daughter Katey and that Gary was working for him. Chuck had turned to a life of crime in order to provide Zombrex for his daughter, but this led to his daughter running away from home. Chuck and Annie reconcile. Gary and Rhonda volunteer to stay and help rescue any remaining survivors before leaving the city.

As Nick is about to take off with the others, he overhears on the radio that Hemlock is planning to create a biological weapon with the zombies. Nick and Chuck then decide to team up to stop Hemlock's plan before escaping. After Hemlock kills Mallon upon being angered by her disrespect, he proceeds with the extraction of king zombies from the city, but Nick and Chuck stop him. The General is ultimately killed in a confrontation with Nick, who escapes the city with the others, leading to the creation and distribution of a cure to the zombie infection. After the credits, it is revealed that Isabella was truly responsible for the outbreak, convincing Mallon to begin it so that the carrier of the immunity would be revealed, and successfully making herself the creator of the cure while clearing her family name from Carlito's crimes in Willamette. Back in the present, Isabella destroys some evidence incriminating her and leaves the city with the others, satisfied that her reputation and future is now safe.

=== Alternate endings ===
Like the previous games, Dead Rising 3 has multiple alternate endings that can occur, depending on the player's choices in the last chapter of the game and if the main campaign is completed before the bombing of Los Perdidos begins. The summary above is the canon ending, Ending S, unlocked if the player follows Nick's morals in the game. (Note: Unlike previous games, Ending A is the ending that leads into Chapter 8 and Ending S, making Ending S the true ending and Ending A the "gateway" true ending.)

The other endings are:

- Ending C (Complete all chapters and kill Gary at the club instead of finding Rhonda)
  After Red is killed, since Gary is dead, he, Rhonda, and Chuck do not show up. Isabella runs up to Nick and Annie exclaiming that they have to leave immediately and they board the plane, but it stalls as they try to take off and are overrun by zombies. The end text states that Hemlock was arrested for his actions; however the parasite infection continued to spread, and rumors of Carlito's "immune orphan" were never proven.
- Ending D (Complete chapters 1 - 6 and escape the Metro Station, but go straight to the plane instead of the club where Annie is being held hostage)
  Nick decides to leave the city by himself, but is discovered by Rhonda, Annie, Red, and Gary, who leave him behind as they escape the city using the plane. The end text states that no survivors were found and the outbreak was the beginning of the end for the United States, as the West Coast went under martial law. Hemlock created his biological weapon from the mutated zombies and caused outbreaks all over America and rumors of Carlito's "immune orphan" were never proven.
- Ending F (Do not complete all the chapters by time the firebomb is scheduled at the end of the 7th day)
  A cutscene plays of the city being destroyed by incendiary bombs. The end text states no survivors were found, Hemlock succeeded in creating his biological weapon from the mutated zombies, and America was put under martial law.
- Overtime Alternate Ending (Fail to stop Hemlock's harvesting of the mutated zombies in chapter 8)
  Hemlock declares success and escapes the city. The end text states that Los Perdidos was destroyed by incendiary bombs and Hemlock created his biological weapon from the mutated zombies and rumors of Carlito's "immune orphan" were never proven. Getting this ending will result in a game over screen, and the player can choose to return to the last checkpoint and try again in Overtime Mode.
- Ending X (Scrapped; intended to be triggered if Nick kills too many survivors)
  After defeating Red, Nick and Annie hug each other. Annie thanks him for saving her, before revealing that she knows of Nick’s wrongdoing. A group of survivors appear: Joey is unarmed, Hank is wielding a spiked bat, Kyla has a crowbar, Kent DeMare is armed with a whisky bottle and one additional unused survivor has a lead pipe. Nick tries to explain that he is special, which makes the survivors angrily question him. Nick pleads with them that he needs to escape before Annie lets him know that he will be in the “Safehouse in the sky”. Nick tries to run, but is knocked down and beaten by the survivors before the final blow is stricken by Hank with the spiked bat.

== Development ==
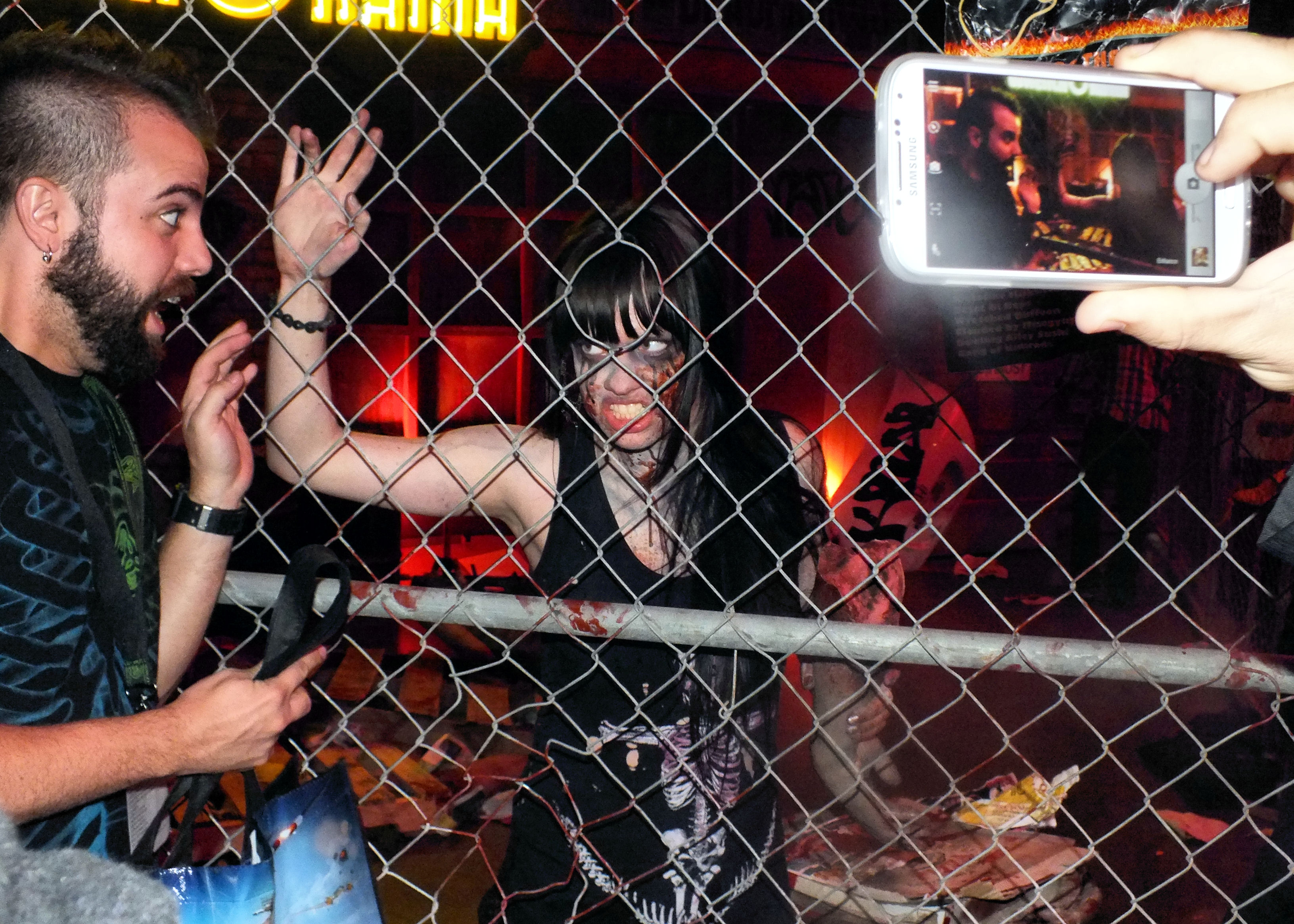
Promotion at E3 2013

In 2010, prior to the release of Dead Rising 2, Keiji Inafune, the producer of the Dead Rising series, had speculated about the possibility for a sequel during an interview, stating that "we're not going to start even speaking about DR3 until we see the sales of DR2—unfortunately that's the nature of the game! However, the experience with Blue Castle was very positive, and if we have the opportunity I would like to work with them again." With the success of Dead Rising 2, Capcom COO David Reese asserted that Dead Rising 3 was likely to continue the narrative of its predecessor. Reese also stated that more digital content, similar to Case Zero and Case West, was also plausible, and would help to bridge the gap between Dead Rising 2 and Dead Rising 3. Klayton of Celldweller is composing music for the game. The game was officially announced during Microsoft's press conference at E3 2013. The game was revealed as originally being developed with high-end PCs in mind so the team could realise their expanded vision for the series, before Microsoft offered to partner with them for it to become an Xbox One launch exclusive. On October 10, 2013, it was announced that Dead Rising 3 was not approved by Germany's rating board and would not be released there. On June 5, 2014, it was announced that Dead Rising 3 would be leaving Xbox One as an exclusive, and would be released on Windows with more details to follow at E3 2014.

The Windows version, which was released on September 5, 2014, has been subject of some controversy after it had been revealed during a Twitch stream of the game that it would be locked at 30 frames per second. Capcom has revealed that the option to unlock the framerate would be available, however they could not guarantee that the game would run smoothly or with sufficient stability. On June 16, a developer of Dead Rising 3 has revealed on the Steam forums that uncapping the framerate would not cause damage to the game. He performed his tests on three different PCs.

== Soundtrack ==
Dead Rising 3 (Original Soundtrack)

Soundtrack album by various artists
- Released: November 19, 2013
- Genre: Soundtrack
- Label: Sumthing Else Music Works

The soundtrack for Dead Rising 3 was released via Sumthing Else Music Works on November 19, 2013, 3 days before the games release. The soundtrack featured various artists including: Celldweller, Oleksa Lozowchuk, Sascha Dikiciyan, Traz Damji, Brian Reitzell, Dave Genn, Ashtar Command, GIBS, Andrew Kalmbach, Jeremy Soule, and Julian Soule. The standard edition contains 40 songs, while the Sumthing.com exclusive version contains 99 songs.

== Downloadable content ==
There are 5 downloadable contents, the first 4 are known as Untold Stories of Los Perdidos. Each one focuses on exploring the zombie outbreak in Los Perdidos depicted in the main story, through the point of view of a different survivor, whom Nick met during the main story. The player controls those survivors instead of Nick. The fifth expansion is the non-canon Super Ultra Dead Rising 3′ Arcade Remix Hyper Edition EX Plus Alpha, which focuses on beat'em up action.

=== Operation Broken Eagle ===
The story of Adam Kane, a Special Forces Commander on a mission to capture the president. He is a psychopath, whom Nick kills in the main story.

=== Fallen Angel ===
The story of Angel Quijano, an illegally infected survivor. She is seen on the main story as part of Annie's group of survivors.

=== Chaos Rising ===
The story of Hunter Thibodeaux, a biker seeking revenge on the people who incarcerated him. He is a psychopath, whom Nick kills using a molotov cocktail in the main story.

=== The Last Agent ===
The story of Brad Park, a ZDC agent searching for the truth about the outbreak.

=== Super Ultra Dead Rising 3′ Arcade Remix Hyper Edition EX Plus Alpha ===
It features four-player co-op, players can control Frank West, Chuck Greene, Katey Greene and Nick Ramos. It also features exclusive costumes which serve as homages to other Capcom franchises. The name is a humorous reference to the various expansions for the Street Fighter series.

== Reception ==
Reception

Aggregate score
Aggregator	Score
Metacritic	(XONE) 78/100 (PC) 70/100

Review scores
Publication	Score
Destructoid	9/10
GameSpot	7/10
GameZone	7/10
IGN	8.3/10

Dead Rising 3 received "generally positive" reviews at release, according to review aggregator website Metacritic. GameSpot gave it a 7/10 and said that "Capcom has successfully made Dead Rising 3 a more welcoming experience than its harsh predecessors." While GameSpot praised the silliness and replay value, it criticized the minimal variety and the technical hiccups. IGN gave the game an 8.3/10, saying that "Dead Rising 3 delivers the undead and great tools to kill them with by the truckload." While they enjoyed the number of zombies on screen and the co-op, they critiqued the performance issues and the padding. GameZone's Jake Valentine gave it a 7/10, stating "Dead Rising 3 is a schizophrenic game. The story is absolutely mess and the difficulty has a tendency to spike every now and then, yet the gameplay is beyond enjoyable and it's a blast to explore the game's sandbox."

During the 17th Annual D.I.C.E. Awards, the Academy of Interactive Arts & Sciences nominated Dead Rising 3 for "Action Game of the Year".

On January 22, 2014, Capcom announced that the game had sold one million copies. By March 31, 2014, the game had sold 1.2 million copies. As of June 30, 2024, the Xbox One version had sold 3.60 million copies worldwide, while the PC port sold an additional 1.20 million copies which totals it to 4.80 million copies worldwide. By the end of 2025, the Xbox version had sold 4.10 million units and the Windows version 1.60 million units, for a total of 5.70 million units.

== Sequel ==
At Microsoft's E3 2016 press conference, Dead Rising 4 was announced for Windows and Xbox One. The game features the return of Frank West as well as a Christmas-themed setting. The title was released on December 6, 2016.
