= Dead Rising (video game) =

2006 video game

- North American cover art
- Developer: Capcom Production Studio 1 (Note: Ported to PlayStation 4, Windows, and Xbox One by QLOC. Deluxe Remaster co-developed by NeoBards Entertainment.)
- Publisher: Capcom
- Director: Yoshinori Kawano
- Producer: Keiji Inafune
- Programmer: Shigeru Kato
- Artist: Keiji Ueda
- Writers: Yoshinori Kawano; Makoto Ikehara
- Composers: Hideki Okugawa; Marika Suzuki
- Series: Dead Rising
- Engine: MT Framework; RE Engine (Deluxe Remaster)
- Platforms: Xbox 360: Remaster; PlayStation 4; Windows; Xbox One; Deluxe Remaster; PlayStation 5; Windows; Xbox Series X/S
- Release: August 8, 2006: Xbox 360; NA: August 8, 2006; EU: September 8, 2006; AU: September 14, 2006; JP: September 28, 2006 Remaster September 13, 2016 Deluxe Remaster September 19, 2024
- Genre: Action-adventure
- Mode: Single-player

Dead Rising (Note: Japanese: デッドライジング, Hepburn: Deddo Raijingu) is a 2006 action-adventure game developed and published by Capcom originally for the Xbox 360. The game's story follows wartime photojournalist Frank West, who becomes trapped inside a shopping mall in the town of Willamette, Colorado, during a deadly zombie plague. West must uncover the truth behind the plague before a rescue helicopter arrives in three days to evacuate him.

The game is played from the third-person perspective and is open world. The open world is set in a large shopping mall. Frank must survive by scavenging weapons to fight zombies and hostile human enemies. Frank can also escort friendly human survivors back to the mall's safe house. The player has 72 in-game hours (6 hours in real time) to finish the main story. Story and side missions are also individually timed, expiring if not completed on time.

Dead Rising was released on August 8, 2006. The game became a critical and commercial success, leading it to being introduced as part of the Xbox 360 "Platinum Hits" lineup and spawning three sequels, Dead Rising 2 in September 2010, Dead Rising 3 in November 2013 and Dead Rising 4 in December 2016. A port of the game developed for the Wii, Dead Rising: Chop Till You Drop, was released in February 2009. A mobile phone version for IPhone was developed in 2010. As part of its tenth anniversary, a remastered version of the game was released on September 13, 2016, for PlayStation 4, Windows, and Xbox One; along with remasters of Dead Rising 2 and Dead Rising 2: Off the Record, respectively. An upgraded "deluxe" remastered version, Dead Rising Deluxe Remaster, was released for PlayStation 5, Windows, and Xbox Series X/S on September 19, 2024.

== Gameplay ==
Frank attacking zombies with a 2x4 plank. There are approximately 30 enemies onscreen.

Players can operate the game in one of two modes. 72 Hour Mode is the main mode and the only one available to players to begin with, in which the main objective is to investigate the Willamette Parkview Mall within three days, before Frank can be rescued by helicopter, completing a series of "Case Files" - major missions that, when completed, advance the game's main story. If the player fails a Case File, the game does not end, allowing the player to merely explore the mall instead until the mode is up, though failure to comply to certain conditions (primarily associated with Case Files) will result in earning a different ending. Completing all the Case Files by the time 72 Hour Mode is over, unlocks "Overtime Mode" which players automatically begin, where the main objective to complete has Frank given one more day to complete an additional set of objectives within the mall. The second mode, ∞ (Infinity) Mode, is unlocked after completing Overtime Mode and allows players to roam around the mall in sandbox mode without any time limit, with Frank trying to survive as long as possible.

To survive in all modes, players need to find and seek out weapons scattered around the mall that they can use against the zombies. Over 250 items are available to use in combat; they can be found anywhere, such as in stores, and fall under two categories, melee and ranged, with all ranging from the powerful, to the near-useless. The weapons and other items are firearms, sports equipment, children's toys, furniture, construction tools, electronic devices, and various bladed objects. Frank can carry only a limited number of weapons - baseball bats, 2x4 planks, hammers, pistols, shotguns, and so forth, though he can carry multiple versions of the same type. He can use them only a limited number of times before he must find new ones, as melee weapons eventually deteriorate and break, while guns must be discarded when out of ammunition. Some weapons can be changed by the environment - frying pans can be heated on a stove both to increase damage and grant access to a special move - while others are large objects that Frank cannot store in his inventory and which he will drop if he picks up or switches to another item. Many of the less useful weapons exist purely for humorous effect. For example, the toy Megabuster, from Capcom's Mega Man, shoots tennis balls; traffic cones are put over a zombie's head, causing it to stumble about blindly.

Items other than weapons are available. Frank can try out various outfits from the mall's clothing stores - such as a special forces uniform, wrestling boots, a hockey mask and X's armour from the Mega Man X franchise. He can carry around certain books that can confer bonuses, such as increasing the durability of weapons. He can consume food and drink scavenged while exploring to recover health, or blend them together to make different "juices", which have temporary effects on the player. In Infinity Mode, players need to eat food to stay alive, as Frank's health drops every 100 seconds. They cannot access the supermarket within the mall, and food items are limited, but they can acquire weapons and food items from all characters; survivors are hostile to them in this mode.

Dead Rising incorporates a role-playing element in the form of an experience system, in which completing various actions will reward Frank with "Prestige Points" (PP). While in both modes, killing large number of zombies can earn PP, so too can taking photographs. Any photograph that Frank takes in the game is automatically scored based on five "genres" - horror (zombies and graphic gore), outtakes (humorous events or scenes), erotica (photos of female survivors or zombies, particularly those focusing on the breasts and crotch), drama (dramatic events, such as the survivors' reactions while in the security room), or brutality (deaths of zombies and other characters) - with the score converted into PP. In addition to these actions, both 72 Hour Mode and Overtime Mode award PP for completing Case Files, and completing the optional task of rescuing survivors within the mall, and defeating "psychopaths" - boss characters who have either been driven insane by the zombie attacks, or are using the outbreak as cover for their own purposes. Once enough PP is earned, Frank will level up, resulting in upgrades to either attack power, running speed, throw distance, health, or to the number of items Frank can carry in his inventory, while new moves can be unlocked, which boost his effectiveness with hand-to-hand combat. Any experience, levels, and unlocked moves earned in a playthrough will automatically be carried over into a new game should the player choose to restart, which can make subsequent playthroughs much easier.

An in-game HUD is provided, which displays information on Frank's health, his prestige level and the amount of PP progress he has made towards the next one, his inventory of weapons and their condition/amount of ammo left, a counter for the number of zombies the player has killed during a playthrough, and objective counters for both major and optional tasks, which consists of a bar that counts down the amount of time a player has to reach where the objective is located within the mall and complete it, before it is considered to be failed. Players have access to a map to help them make their way around the mall and pinpoint where they must go in the main game mode, can receive calls on a transceiver about anything suspicious that Frank can investigate (he cannot jump, attack, switch weapons, or pick up/use any item when taking a call), and can view Frank's watch to determine what time it is; in-game time progresses faster than real time, with a day in the game taking two hours of real time, while the time of day affects the behaviour of the zombies - during the day, they are sluggish and weak, but become more active, tougher, and more numerous at night. Players may save by using green couches or the mall's various restrooms, though the original Xbox 360 version allows only one game-in-progress save to be made per memory device and player profile; the save system is disabled for Infinity Mode. When Frank is killed, the player may reload from the last save or restart from the beginning.

== Plot ==
Photojournalist Frank West is alerted by an anonymous source that something is occurring in Willamette, Colorado. Flying into town via helicopter, Frank learns that the town is under quarantine by the U.S. military, witnessing several violent incidents throughout. Wanting to cover the story, Frank asks his helicopter pilot to return in three days and is promptly dropped off at the town shopping mall helipad. Upon entering the mall Frank learns the quarantine was caused by a zombie outbreak, infecting a majority of Willamette's population.

Eventually, the mall is breached by zombies, forcing Frank to hide in the security room. With the help of janitor Otis Washington, Frank is able to safely travel through the mall. After helping DHS agent Brad Garrison in a firefight against an unknown assailant, the two team up. A person of interest to Brad, an elderly man named Russell, is currently locked in a bookstore, which he refuses to leave. When Frank and Brad return to the security room, the two realize that they can't call for help due to a communications jammer.

Frank meets and saves several survivors, as well as facing psychotic individuals. Eventually, Frank and Brad are able to rescue Russell, who was captured by the assailant who had previously attacked the two. While rescuing Russell, Brad is injured leading to Frank needing to search for medicine to treat him. In his search, Frank finds the medicine he needs in a supermarket held by its manager, who is also keeping a woman captive. Frank gains the medicine by killing the manager and saves the woman, who strongly rebukes him while also mentioning something named Santa Cabeza. Russell later reveals that Santa Cabeza was a Central American town linked to a drug trade, which distributed drugs that had a zombifying effect.

When Frank finds the woman, she reveals herself to be Isabela Keyes, the sister to Frank and Brad's prior assailant, Carlito. She promises to set up an interview between Frank and Carlito, but going to the meeting alone is shot by a rageful Carlito. She is rescued by Frank and carried to the security room, and reveals that Santa Cabeza held a research facility experimenting on cattle involving native wasps. These experiments intended to boost the performance of the cows but instead had a zombifying effect that infected Willamette. In response, Santa Cabeza was quarantined and massacred by the U.S. military to cover up the incident. Isabella was research assistant for the project, while Russell was the head operator of it. Upon her explanation, Russell ends up becoming a zombie, attacking Brad's partner before being shot by Frank.

With Russell dead, Isabela reveals that Carlito plans to use the mall as a staging point to spread the wasp parasites across the country by blowing it up with bombs placed in its parking garage. Followed by Brad, Frank disarms the bombs, while Carlito is wounded in a firefight with Brad. Carlito kicks Brad into a horde of zombies, resulting in Brad dying and becoming zombified. Frank eventually tracks and relocates Carlito, who was taken captive by a butcher. Upon killing the butcher, Carlito gives Frank his locket before he dies from his injuries. A photo inside the locket provides Isabela with a clue, letting her type in the password to Carlito's computer and shut off the communications jammer. Regardless, U.S. Special Forces arrive with orders to clear out the area of any zombies or survivors, save for Brad's partner who ends up zombifying shortly after they arrive. Otis and any other survivors that Frank rescued end up escaping by helicopter.

Returning to the helipad, Frank's rescue helicopter crashes due to a stowaway zombie. Surrounded by zombies, Frank is rescued by Isabela, but passes out and is infected by the wasp parasite. Coming to his senses, Frank gathers supplies to make a drug that can temporarily suppress it, during which Frank discovers an exit opened up by his helicopter's crash. Isabela learns from Carlito's computer that he had manufactured the parasite suppressing drug before and used it on fifty infected orphans which were spread across the country. Upon taking the drug, they escape the mall, where they encounter the Special Forces. Frank is confronted by their commander Brock Mason, who had also commanded Santa Cabeza's operation. The two men fight, ending with Brock being knocked into a swarm of zombies. An end title card reveals that Frank escaped from Willamette. Frank manages to report on the incident and Santa Cabeza, but the truth of Carlito's orphans remains unknown.

== Development ==
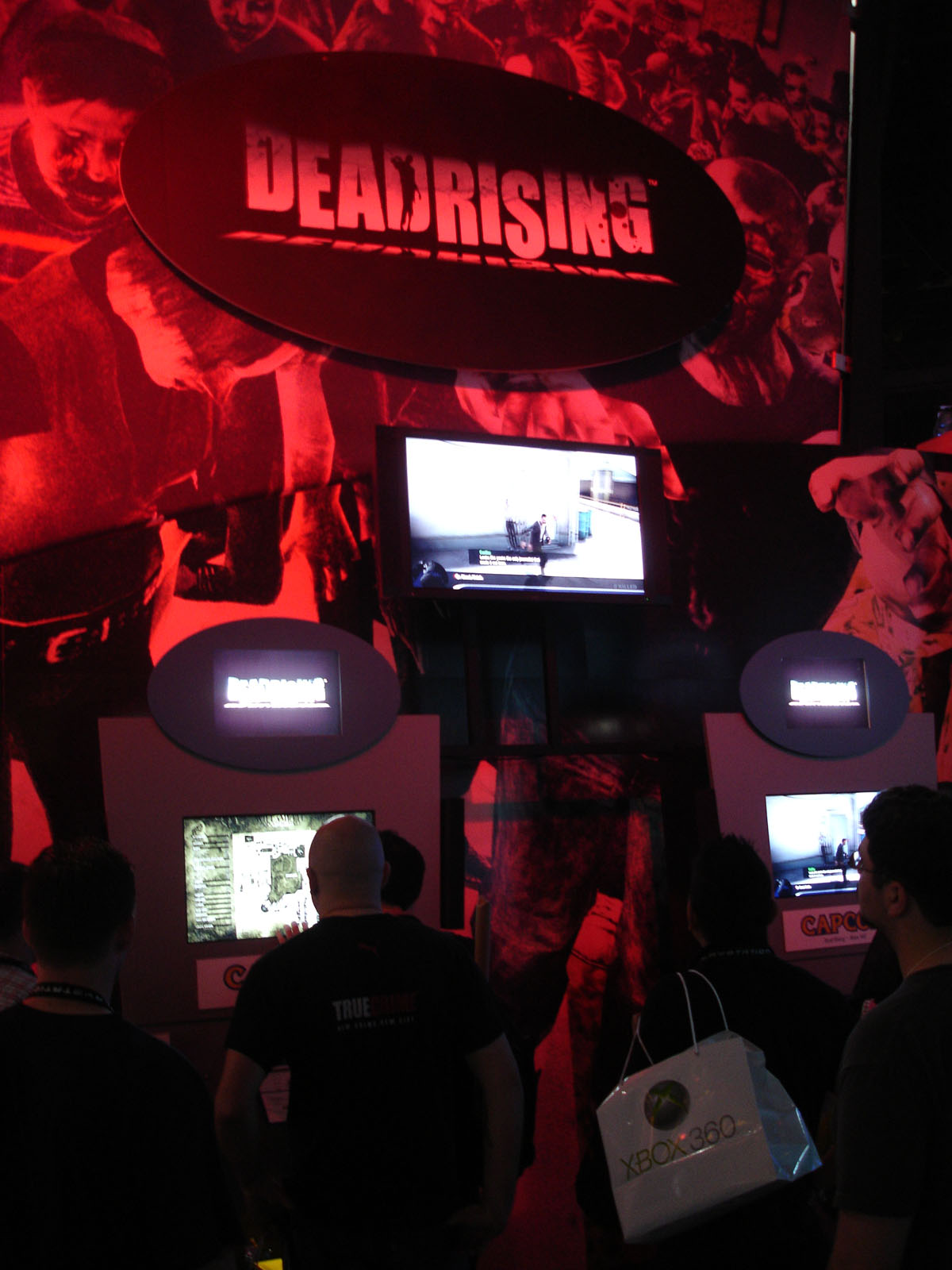
Promotion at E3 2006

Dead Rising started development as a sequel to Shadow of Rome. The development team knew they wanted to make a game aimed at the Western market and also something different this time around so they changed the story, setting and time period from Shadow of Rome. Despite the game's similarities to George A. Romero's Dawn of the Dead, Capcom asserted that the concept of "humans battling zombies in a shopping mall" is a "wholly unprotectible idea" under the present copyright laws. While the company wanted to have the game follow on from Resident Evil, Capcom's other zombie-centered game series, its development team opted to design the game with a more comical view of zombies in the horror genre, particularly in the way that players interacted with the zombies in the game, allowing them to be able to do anything against them in terms of what weapons they could use against them, while they based the mall upon the stereotypical design of American shopping malls. One particular area that was keenly worked on by the team was the number of zombies that could appear onscreen during the game in order to give the feel that it was a major outbreak; when Electronic Gaming Monthly reviewed the game, they reported that up to 800 zombies could appear on screen at once. As the development team consisted of members who had worked on Capcom's role-playing video game Breath of Fire: Dragon Quarter, it helped greatly in incorporating one of the game's elements borrowed from it, towards the developing the mechanics structure of Dead Rising - the ability to roll over anything earned in terms of experience, levels and abilities, towards making a new playthrough, was implemented so that players would have a sense of responsibility for their decisions and actions.

After making changes to the beta of the game, a playable demo was released via the Xbox Live Marketplace on August 4, 2006, prior to its release over the next two months.

=== Soundtrack ===
Dead Rising Original Soundtrack was released in Japan on March 30, 2007, in a 2,000-copy limited edition, bundled with a T-shirt. It was packaged with a T-shirt that showcased Frank, Isabella, and an outline of the mall. A non-limited edition of the same soundtrack was released on June 20, 2007.

=== Downloadable content ===
After Dead Rising was released in the United States, Capcom released nine downloadable "keys" to Xbox Live Marketplace that would unlock different lockers in the Security Room, providing the player with nine new outfit options, adding three more keys for players to download and use on May 31, 2007.

== Reception ==
Reception

Aggregate score
Aggregator	Score
Metacritic	85/100

Review scores
Publication	Score
1Up.com	B+
Eurogamer	8/10
Game Informer	9.25/10
GameSpot	8.4/10
GameSpy	4.5/5
GamesRadar+	8/10
GameTrailers	7.8/10
IGN	8.3/10
TeamXbox	8.7/10

Dead Rising received "generally favorable reviews" from critics, according to review aggregator Metacritic. Most reviewers commended the "sandbox"-style of gameplay, the amount to explore within the mall, and the sheer number of ways to kill the thousands of zombies. GameSpot stated it was "a great piece of entertainment", while two reviewers on Australian video game talk show Good Game gave the title a 6-7/10 score. However, general consensus amongst reviews was towards criticising the game's save system mechanic and the AI of the survivors; while IGN considered the game to be "one of the more unique and entertaining titles on the Xbox 360", its review notably indicated that improvements were needed with both the save system and NPCs, along with offering "a more forgiving story progression, and tighter controls". One point of contention in reviews was the operation of the game's transceiver, specifically on how persistent it is when ringing, how vulnerable Frank is while answering any calls on it, and how if the telephone call is somehow interrupted (such as being attacked), it would end abruptly and be repeated again when the player answers the transceiver a few seconds later and hears Frank being scolded by Otis for disrupting him; the use of the transceiver in the game led to numerous gamer-oriented webcomics and blogs parodying the use of it. Capcom reported around 500,000 copies had been shipped out in the first month after its release, and one million copies worldwide by the end of 2006. It received a "Gold" sales award from the Entertainment and Leisure Software Publishers Association (ELSPA), indicating sales of at least 200,000 copies in the United Kingdom.

One notable complaint that Dead Rising received, was from players who ran the game through either a standard-definition or small high-definition set, only to find themselves having difficulty reading the on-screen text, an issue caused due to Capcom deciding to develop the game exclusively for high-definition televisions, particularly as it had been touted as one of the first truly "next generation" titles available for the Xbox 360. In response to the complaints about the issue, a representative of the company posted the following on Xbox.com:

Dear everyone, I have heard your concerns and passed them to every source within Capcom possible. I feel your pain as I, myself, have a large SDTV and am having trouble reading the mission objectives, item names, etc. Unfortunately it does take time to resolve any issue and we would want to fix the issue appropriately as any changes to any game can create additional problems from the result of change; that's just how game programming works and that's why games go through extensive game testing programs and approvals.

A week later, Capcom released a statement saying they would not be fixing the problem, and suggested some DIY solutions to resolve the issue.

=== Awards ===
Along with being ranked #2 in gaming magazine Gamesmaster's Top 50 of 2006, Dead Rising won several awards:

- IGN awarded the title "Most Innovative Design for Xbox 360" in its Best of 2006.
- GameSpot's Best and Worst of 2006 awarded the game with the honors of "Best Action Adventure Game", "Best Sound Effects", and "Best Use of Xbox 360 Achievement Points".
- The 2006 Spike TV Video Game Awards awarded it with "Best Action Game".
- X-Play awarded it with "Best Original Game" of 2006.

=== Reaction in Germany ===
Because of the graphical nature of the violence portrayed in Dead Rising, the BPjM in Germany felt that game fulfilled at least one of their indexing criteria, documenting that the title glorified violence. As a direct result, the Unterhaltungssoftware Selbstkontrolle, the board responsible for rating entertainment software for Germany, refused to rate the game, and effectively put a halt to Microsoft publishing a German version, as the company does not allow unrated games to be released for the Xbox 360, though the game was made available for import to players of a legal age. However, after a decision by Hamburg's county court in June 2007, it was prohibited within the country from late August 2007, making sales of the title illegal in Germany; anyone caught selling the game would be sentenced to imprisonment or a monetary penalty according to §131 of the German criminal code, with all copies confiscated by the German police.

=== Legal issues ===
The MKR Group, who holds the copyright to both the 1978 Dawn of the Dead film and its 2004 remake, sent letters on February 6, 2008, to Capcom, Microsoft, and Best Buy, claiming that Dead Rising infringes on the copyrights and trademarks of these films. In a complaint filed February 12, 2008, to seek an injunction that would pre-emptively counter an anticipated complaint from MKR, Capcom asserted that "humans battling zombies in a shopping mall" is a "wholly unprotectable idea" under today's copyright laws; Capcom further pointed to the warning "label" on the box cover as a preemptive measure that was intended to separate the game from the films and avoid any customer confusion. The MKR Group subsequently filed a lawsuit in February 2008 after failing to reach an agreement with Capcom over the dispute.

The lawsuit was dismissed in October 2008, with United States Magistrate Judge Richard G. Seeborg stating that MKR failed to demonstrate the similarity of any protected element of Dawn of the Dead to that of Dead Rising, with many of the elements MKR claimed were similar being part of the "wholly unprotectable concept of humans battling zombies in a mall during a zombie outbreak".

== Rereleases and other versions ==
=== Wii version ===
A port of Dead Rising was released for the Wii in February 2009, titled Dead Rising: Chop Till You Drop, and was developed by Capcom and published by THQ in Australia. Built upon the same engine used for the Wii version of Resident Evil 4, which had been positively received by reviewers, the port incorporated additional features to that of the Xbox 360 original, including the use of an over-the-shoulder camera approach and utilising the motion control system of the Wii Remote, yet lacked some of the features of the original, including showing large number of zombies on screen and the photography system. The Wii version ultimately earned mixed reviews, though was praised for having an improved aiming system to that of the original.

=== Hand-held versions ===
In 2008, Capcom released a hand-held spin-off of the game for mobile phone, announcing on 4 October 2010 that an iOS version of the game was also announced. In this version, players have access to a new game mechanic in which they can call upon their friends via Twitter and Facebook to help revive them, with their refusal causing them to appear as a zombie within their friend's game, while complex operations in the game are performed through context-based buttons. Similar to Infinity Mode in the console version, the game features a hunger meter, with Frank now required to eat food within the mall in order to survive. The hand-held spin-off was generally well received by reviewers, earning a B+ from 1UP.com, and a 7.3/10 from IGN, with praise given for staying true to the sandbox design and plot of the Xbox 360 version, despite being pared down for the smaller screen and platform.

=== Remastered version ===
On 18 July 2016, Capcom announced that work was underway for a remastered version of the original Dead Rising, alongside its sequel Dead Rising 2 and its spin-off title, aiming for these to be released for the Xbox One, PlayStation 4, and PC, prior to the release of the fourth game in the series. These were released on 13 September that year, both separately and in a bundle pack, with the developers improving the game's graphics to high-definition, increasing the number of save slots and improving the frame-rate.

=== Dead Rising Deluxe Remaster (2024) ===
On 26 June 2024, Capcom announced Dead Rising Deluxe Remaster, featuring improved graphics from the original with the RE Engine. It includes several changes, such as the ability to walk while shooting and new voice acting. The game was released on September 19, 2024, for PlayStation 5, Windows, and Xbox Series X/S digitally, with a physical version and a demo being released on November 8, 2024.

The Deluxe Remaster faced criticism from fans for censorship, missing content, and seemingly using AI-upscaling on textures. The Deluxe Remaster removed sexual content (including the Erotica points system), removed dialogue (including one instance where a character calls Frank a "filthy communist"), changing characters' backstories, and altered a boss character's design (to remove racial stereotypes).

In response, Capcom stated that they removed some of the game's sexual content due to a "changing cultural climate".

=== Sequels ===
Following the game's commercial success, plans were made to create a sequel, with it aimed to operate on multiple platforms. On 28 September 2010, Dead Rising 2 was released for Xbox 360, PlayStation 3, and Windows, and while it followed the basic setup of gameplay mechanics as the original, it featured a new character, a currency system, a weapon creation system that involved finding "Combo Cards" to know what to make, and online multiplayer modes, including zombie-killing minigames and two-player cooperative play, whilst also featuring improvements to address some of the negative feedback that Dead Rising received. Since its release, two downloadable episodes were released for the game - Case Zero, a prologue set before the main story of Dead Rising 2, and Case West, set place after it and featuring Frank West, who is also controllable in it - and a re-imagined version titled Dead Rising 2: Off the Record was released in October 2011, with a new story and Frank West being the main protagonist.

The game spawned two more sequels, developed by Capcom's Canadian branch, Capcom Vancouver - Dead Rising 3 was released on 22 November 2013 for Xbox One and on 5 September 2014 for Windows, while Dead Rising 4 was released on 6 December 2016. Capcom Vancouver was also developing another sequel to the franchise, which was cancelled when the studio closed down in September 2018.
