= Peter von Gomm =

American–Japanese voice actor

- Occupation: Voice actor
- Years active: 1995–present
- Spouse: Kyoko
- Children: 1
- Website: www.petervongomm.com

Peter von Gomm is an American voice actor. He moved to Japan in 1999 and records television commercials, documentaries, video games and more for the Japanese and global market.

== Career ==
Von Gomm worked for the Smithsonian Institution in Washington, D.C., for 4 years as an exhibition designer and primarily did editorial designs for handicapped and audiobook narration. In 1995, he moved to Japan to work as a voice actor and narrator in Tokyo.

He has regularly done narrator work of Basic English 2, Practical Business English and Radio English Conversation Study of NHK Radio Courses. He was an NHK World's news reporter. He did several character voices of the NHK Educational Programme, Little Charo 2. He has voiced in the Speed Learning audiobook for English for over 10 years. In CS Benesse Channel, Eigo de GO!, Gomm played a main role "teacher" as an actor and a voice actor. In 2003, Gomm was cast as the main role character "RD" of US animation series Zoids: Fuzors of Cartoon Network. He did video game character voices for games on PlayStation 3 and the Nintendo DS. He also did narration works of TV documentary programmes and company promotional videos.

On October 14, 2017, Von Gomm started a YouTube channel called Peter von Gomm Japan. It has videos about the motorcycle culture and interesting places in Japan. As of June 2022 the channel has 23 thousand subscribers.

== Personal life ==
Von Gomm is married to a Japanese woman called Kyoko. His son Jyoji was born in 2010.

== Filmography ==
=== Television ===
Year	Title	Role	Notes	Ref.
2001	Zoids: New Century	Bit Cloud	Alternate English dub; pilot	
2016	Fastening Days	Sailor C	English dub; episode 2	
2017	Azure Striker Gunvolt: The Anime	Copen	English dub	
2018	Free! Dive to the Future	Ralph	Original Japanese dub	

=== Tokusatsu ===
Year	Title	Role	Notes	Ref.
2016	Kamen Rider Ghost	Mega Ulorder announcement	Television series	
2019	Ultra Galaxy Fight: New Generation Heroes	Ultraman Ginga	English dub; web series	
2020	Ultra Galaxy Fight: The Absolute Conspiracy	Ultraman Cosmos, Ultraman Z	English dub; web series	
2022	Ultra Galaxy Fight: The Destined Crossroad	Ultraman Cosmos, Ultraman Ginga, Ultraman Z	English dub; web series	

=== Video games ===
Year	Title	Role	Notes	Ref.
2003	Mega Man X7	X	English dub	
2003	Transformers Tataki	Rodimus Prime, Hound, Brainstorm, Weirdwolf		
2003	Glass Rose	Koutaro Katagiri, Kiyohiko Yoshikawa	English dub	
2003	Baten Kaitos: Eternal Wings and the Lost Ocean	King Ladekahn	English dub	
2005	Cobra the Arcade	Cobra	English dub	
2005	Shining Force Neo	Vandolf	English dub	
2007	Mega Man ZX Advent	Grey	English dub	
2010	Tatsunoko vs. Capcom: Ultimate All-Stars	Frank West	English dub	
2010	Ace Combat: Joint Assault	Nicolae Dumitrescu	English dub	
2010	Deadstorm Pirates	Bruno	English dub	
2016	Pokkén Tournament	Jake	English dub	
2017	ARMS	Spring Man, Springtron		
2017	Super Bomberman R	White Bomberman	English dub	
2018	Super Smash Bros. Ultimate	Spring Man	Archive audio	
2020	Super Bomberman R Online	White Bomberman	English dub	
2023	Super Bomberman R 2	White Bomberman	English dub	
2024	Card-en-Ciel	Flamefrit, Pietro Caetani, Sheol, Yuu Kurokawa	English dub	
