= Tatsunoko vs. Capcom =

2008 video game

- North American Ultimate All-Stars box art depicting the Capcom and Tatsunoko characters on the left and right, respectively
- Developer: Eighting
- Publisher: Capcom
- Directors: Hidetoshi Ishizawa; Shinji Ueda
- Producer: Ryota Niitsuma
- Series: Vs.
- Platforms: Arcade, Wii
- Release: December 2008: Cross Generation of Heroes Arcade; JP: December 2008 Wii; JP: December 11, 2008 Ultimate All-Stars (Wii); NA: January 26, 2010; JP: January 28, 2010; EU: January 29, 2010
- Genre: Fighting
- Modes: Single-player, multiplayer
- Arcade system: Proprietary Wii-based arcade board

Tatsunoko vs. Capcom (Note: Japanese: タツノコ VS. CAPCOM) is a crossover fighting game developed by Eighting and published by Capcom. The game features characters from both Capcom's video game franchises and various anime series produced by Tatsunoko Production. It was originally released in Japan for arcades and the Wii video game console in December 2008 as Tatsunoko vs. Capcom: Cross Generation of Heroes. Following high demand from international fans, Capcom worked with Tatsunoko to resolve international licensing issues and a second version, Tatsunoko vs. Capcom: Ultimate All-Stars, was released for the Wii in North America, Japan, and Europe in January 2010, featuring additional characters and online multiplayer.

In Tatsunoko vs. Capcom, players engage in combat with a team of two characters or with a single giant character and attempt to knock out their opponents. It is the seventh Capcom-designed installment in their Vs. fighting game series, which includes the Marvel vs. Capcom and Capcom vs. SNK series, and the first to be fully rendered in 3D graphics. The game is set in a 2.5D environment; characters fight in a two-dimensional arena, but character models and backgrounds are rendered in three-dimensional graphics. The game is designed around a simplified three-button attack system, which was inspired by the simplistic control schemes commonly used by both the Vs. series and the Wii.

The game received generally positive reviews from critics, who praised its approachable gameplay for newcomers and depth for veteran players. However, reviewers had mixed experiences with its online component, and found Arcade mode lacking in replay value. According to the game's producer, Ryota Niitsuma, development difficulties and a lack of Wii fighting games were the reasons for its platform exclusivity; however, multiple critics questioned if that was the best choice. Capcom announced in April 2010 that the game was a commercial success.

== Gameplay ==
Joe the Condor of Gatchaman attacks Batsu of Rival Schools. The characters' life and Hyper Combo gauges are displayed across the top and bottom of the screen, respectively. The red sections of the life gauges represent recently received damage that can be regenerated when characters are switched.

Tatsunoko vs. Capcom is a tag team-based fighting game in which players control characters with different attacks and fighting styles, and engage in combat to deplete their opponent's life gauge. The gameplay is set in a 2.5D environment where the characters are rendered in three-dimensional graphics, but their movements are restricted to a two dimensional plane; they may only move left and right, and upward through the air. Each player may select a team of two characters and can switch between them during combat. Alternatively, players may select one of two "giant" characters, who cannot be played as part of a team. When characters switch, the incoming one performs a special attack upon entry, and the previous one can regenerate health. Characters not in play may be used to assist, and to perform powerful team moves. A match ends when a team has no characters left, or when the timer reaches zero—in which case, the team with the most remaining life wins.

The arcade release of Cross Generation of Heroes has a control scheme consisting of a joystick and four buttons. Wii versions of Tatsunoko vs. Capcom have five control options: the Classic Controller, Nintendo GameCube controller, third-party arcade sticks, and two simplified control schemes—intended for inexperienced players—for the Wii Remote. Players use controller inputs to perform attacks; the most basic attacks are executed by pressing one of three attack buttons: light, medium, or strong. Players may augment basic attacks with joystick or control pad directional inputs; for example, a standard strong attack can become a sweep when the down input is added. Basic attacks can be strung together to perform combos.

Each character has unique "universal techniques"—special attacks that are more powerful than normal moves—that require complex control inputs. Similar inputs are used to perform even stronger versions of special moves called Hyper Combos and Team Hyper Combos; these deal damage relative to the size of the player's Hyper Combo gauge, which increases when the character inflicts or receives damage. Certain universal techniques are usable by all characters; for example, each character possesses one that launches opponents upward, rendering them vulnerable to an "air combo". Other common universal techniques include the "Baroque Combo", which sacrifices the regenerable portion of a character's life gauge, but allows players to extend combos and deal more damage; and the "Mega Crash", which creates a temporary barrier around the character to knock back opponents, but partially drains their Hyper Combo and life gauges.

=== Modes ===
Cross Generation of Heroes, the 2008 Wii version of Tatsunoko vs. Capcom, has an Arcade game mode: the player fights against artificial intelligence (AI)-controlled opponents to reach the final boss character, Yami from Ōkami. Time attack and Survival modes are also available, and require the player to defeat every character in the game. While Survival limits health regeneration, Time attack challenges players to win in the shortest time possible. Other modes include Vs. Mode, in which two players engage in combat, and Original Games, which sees up to four players competing in character-specific minigames. Using money obtained throughout the game, the player may purchase unlockable characters, alternate character costumes, minigames, character profiles, movies, illustrations, and background music. Once purchased, the latter four are viewable in a gallery. The arcade release of Cross Generation of Heroes omits the game modes, and instead features a character selection screen from which a player may compete against either AI opponents or a second player.

Ultimate All-Stars has largely the same features as the Wii version of Cross Generation of Heroes, with the exception of Original Games; instead, it features a top-down shooter minigame set in the Lost Planet world called "Ultimate All-Shooters". Unique to Ultimate All-Stars is Nintendo Wi-Fi Connection support for Vs. Mode competition over the Internet. Online multiplayer matches may be played either with registered friends or opponents, or randomly selected participants. Players can choose from randomly selected opponents to be of a rank similar to their own. Rank is decided by battle points, which fluctuate when a ranked match is won or lost. Once a match is completed, players can add a consenting opponent to a Rival Roster for future matches.

== Playable characters ==
Tatsunoko vs. Capcom features playable characters drawn from Capcom video game franchises like Street Fighter, Mega Man, and Viewtiful Joe and Tatsunoko Production anime franchises such as Science Ninja Team Gatchaman, Yatterman, and Casshan. The original arcade version of Cross Generation of Heroes features 18 characters, which was increased to 22 for its Wii release; this was increased again to 26 for Ultimate All-Stars, though one character from the previous version was not included. The rosters of both Cross Generation of Heroes and Ultimate All-Stars are evenly divided between Tatsunoko and Capcom characters. The game's two largest and most powerful characters, Tatsunoko's Gold Lightan and Capcom's PTX-40A, cannot have partners; by extension, they cannot perform universal techniques that require a partner. Non-playable characters, derived from Capcom and Tatsunoko intellectual properties, make cameo appearances during certain attacks; for example, Casshan is assisted by his robotic dog, Friender, while Doronjo is accompanied by her lackeys Boyacky and Tonzura.

=== Tatsunoko characters ===
- Casshan (Casshan)
- Doronjo (Yatterman)
- Gold Lightan (Golden Warrior Gold Lightan)
- Hakushon Daimaō (The Genie Family) (Note: Added in the Wii version of Cross Generation of Heroes) (Note: Removed in Ultimate All-Stars)
- Ippatsuman (Gyakuten! Ippatsuman)
- Joe the Condor (Science Ninja Team Gatchaman) (Note: Added in Ultimate All-Stars)
- Jun the Swan (Science Ninja Team Gatchaman)
- Karas (Karas)
- Ken the Eagle (Science Ninja Team Gatchaman)
- Polimar (Hurricane Polimar)
- Tekkaman (Tekkaman: The Space Knight)
- Tekkaman Blade (Tekkaman Blade)
- Yatterman-1 (Yatterman)
- Yatterman-2 (Yatterman)

=== Capcom characters ===
- Alex (Street Fighter)
- Batsu (Rival Schools)
- Chun-Li (Street Fighter)
- Frank West (Dead Rising)
- Kaijin no Soki (Onimusha)
- Mega Man Volnutt (Mega Man)
- Morrigan (Darkstalkers)
- PTX-40A (Lost Planet)
- Roll (Mega Man)
- Ryu (Street Fighter)
- Saki (Quiz Nanairo Dreams)
- Viewtiful Joe (Viewtiful Joe)
- Zero (Mega Man)

== Development ==
=== Cross Generation of Heroes ===
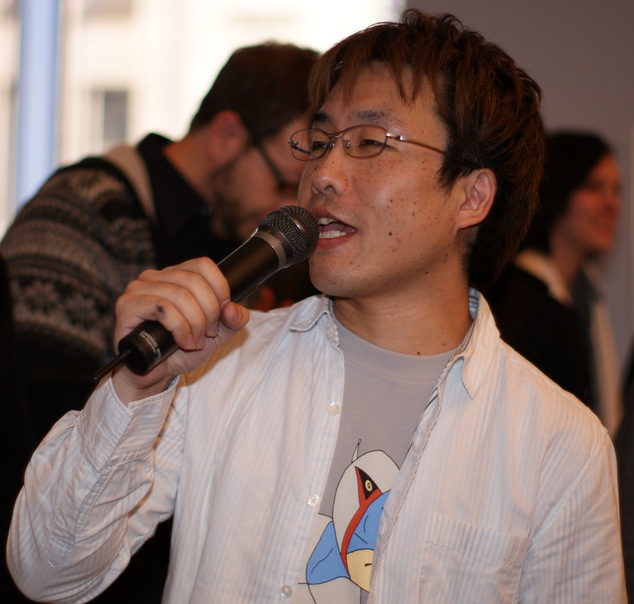
Capcom producer Ryota Niitsuma who previously worked on Street Fighter IV

Tatsunoko vs. Capcom was conceived when Tatsunoko Production asked Capcom to develop a game with Tatsunoko characters. In-company discussions at Capcom about it started in mid-2006; Capcom producer Ryota Niitsuma was interested in producing a fighting game, and agreed with other Capcom employees that Tatsunoko's characters would be better suited for a Vs. game than a Street Fighter game. The resulting project was the seventh Capcom-designed entry in the Vs. series and the first in over seven years. In the 2000s decade, fighting games were less popular and plentiful than in the mid-1990s, with multiplayer competition shifting towards other genres.

The research and development team started work in parallel with Street Fighter IV. "Capcom [hoped to] bring back the fighting genre into the mainstream market [...] with a serious fighting game for very hardcore fans, and another with a slightly lowered barrier to entry," Niitsuma said. Eighting, Capcom's hired developer, took on the job in early 2007. Tatsunoko vs. Capcom's design was a departure from the complex attack systems of the Street Fighter series, and of certain Vs. titles. The game is built around a simplified three-button attack system (light, medium, and strong); it was inspired by the control systems commonly used by both the Vs. series and the Wii, which allows intricate moves to be performed with basic control inputs.

On May 22, 2008, Capcom announced the game, titled Tatsunoko vs. Capcom: Cross Generation of Heroes, for release in Japanese arcades. The arcade cabinets' system board was proprietary hardware based on the Wii. Beta units were sent to test locations in Tokyo (July 10–13) and Osaka (July 25–27). By September, the game was 70% complete, and a Wii version was announced for Japanese release. Capcom gradually revealed the game's cast until release.

When choosing candidates for the Tatsunoko and Capcom character rosters, the development team was free to nominate any character it wished. However, the team faced limitations on its Tatsunoko candidates; Niitsuma explained, "[We] had to consider licensing issues. Once we had that list we had to figure out how to make a balanced fighting game. On top of that we wanted a good balance between male and female characters." Selection emphasis was placed on main characters, rather than on villains. Certain characters were denied by Tatsunoko Production without explanation to Capcom. "We weren't privy to a lot of their decision making process. They didn't share a lot of reasons with us. When they said no and we asked why, they wouldn't tell us, but would give us another suggestion," Niitsuma said. They disallowed characters from Genesis Climber MOSPEADA or Samurai Pizza Cats, despite the high number of fan requests for the latter. The eponymous characters of Tatsunoko's Muteking, The Dashing Warrior and Nurse Witch Komugi were among those planned for inclusion, but were eventually scrapped. The finalized Tatsunoko cast consists of characters that the team enjoyed in their youth. The development team hoped to include Phoenix Wright and Franziska von Karma from Capcom's Ace Attorney series, but, while the latter's use of a whip made her easy to incorporate, the team struggled to find appropriate attacks for Phoenix. Since Phoenix does not move from the waist down in his original game environment, the team considered adding tires to his desk and having the entirety move as a single character. However, this was abandoned due to potential collision issues. Though they envisioned an attack that used his catch-phrase "Objection! (異議あり!, Igiari!)", with the letters themselves used to attack the opponent, they found that localization would have changed the Japanese four-character phrase (in kanji) to a ten-letter word in English, unbalancing the game. According to Niitsuma, during an interview with Siliconera, the inclusion of the race car driver and title character from Speed Racer was discussed but could not be incorporated as he lacked a viable moveset and the vehicle itself was not feasible. Arthur from Ghosts 'n Goblins, and Ingrid from Capcom Fighting Evolution were also scrapped.

The game is the first Capcom-designed Vs. installment to be rendered fully in 3D. Tatsunoko vs. Capcom and its graphical characteristics were optimized for the Wii, which prevents the game from being ported to other consoles without completely re-building the game. Niitsuma explained that its Wii exclusivity was also due to a lack of Capcom fighting games for the console, and because the Wii's casual quality matches the Vs. series trait of accessibility. The producer suggested that porting a sequel would be easier, but that Capcom would gauge the reception of the Wii game before making such plans.

=== Ultimate All-Stars ===
On May 6, 2009, Capcom listed two "mystery games" as part of their Electronic Entertainment Expo 2009 (E3 2009) lineup. Nintendo Power magazine revealed "Capcom Mystery Game #1" to be the North American localization of Tatsunoko vs. Capcom: Cross Generation of Heroes, with the new subtitle "Ultimate All-Stars". It was playable at the company's E3 booth. European and Australian releases were announced on later dates. The game was originally unintended for release outside Japan, but was localized by Capcom due to positive fan reception. Tatsunoko Production assisted Capcom with its character licensing issues; while Tatsunoko Production holds such rights in Japan, they are licensed to companies such as Time Warner in other countries. Niitsuma said that acquiring character licenses was difficult, as it was largely done one at a time, and characters cleared in North America had to be checked separately in Europe. Another issue was the possibility that Eighting would be occupied with other projects. Time constraints led Niitsuma to replace the character-specific minigames of Cross Generation of Heroes with "Ultimate All-Shooters", an expansion of PTX-40A's minigame. Artwork by UDON replaced the animated character-specific endings.

A Capcom press release in June 2009 stated that the North American release would have more mini-games, an "enhanced" story mode, and support for online play. The roster would be expanded by five characters, but would lose one unnamed Tatsunoko character. However, Capcom later revised this press release, as it was incorrect, with the statement that they were "looking into adding new features to the game, including possible additions of several new characters from both Capcom and Tatsunoko and [...] exploring the option of online gameplay."

On September 9, 2009, Capcom announced the Japanese release of Ultimate All-Stars. Starting on that day, the company periodically revealed the game's new characters; however, the full cast was leaked through JavaScript code on the game's official Japanese site. With the exception of Hakushon Daimaō, who was removed due to unspecified licensing issues, every playable character from the original Wii release was included. Hakushon Daimaō was also removed in Ultimate All-Stars' Japanese release, due to both his unpopularity with players, and the game's status as a localization of the North American version. The new characters encompassed Frank West from Dead Rising, Zero from Mega Man X, Yatterman-2 from Yatterman, Joe the Condor from Gatchaman, and the title character from Tekkaman Blade. Shinji Ueda served as a director along with Hidetoshi Ishizawa. Ishizawa admitted that, just as Cross Generation of Heroes was not initially planned to be released internationally, neither was Ultimate All-Stars planned to be released in Japan. However, fan appeals and the research and development team's own hopes resulted in the game's Japanese localization.

== Release ==
Tatsunoko vs. Capcom: Cross Generation of Heroes was released in Japan on the Wii on December 11, 2008, and an arcade version followed in mid-December 2008.

An official launch event for Tatsunoko vs. Capcom: Ultimate All Stars was held at the Nintendo World Store in the Rockefeller Center on January 23, 2010, featuring autograph signings by Niitsuma, giveaways, competitions, and playable demo kiosks. Hundreds of fans were expected to attend between 11 pm and 3 pm. The game was released in North America on January 26, in Japan on January 28, and in Europe on January 29. Certain versions were bundled with a Mad Catz arcade stick, whose artwork was produced by Japanese artist Shinkiro. Pre-orders from GameStop included eight of thirteen lenticular trading cards. As a buying incentive, Capcom's Japanese online store offered a Secret File compilation book of concept art, illustrations and design notes; it is the twenty-seventh volume of the Secret File series, which was originally published between 1996 and 1999 as a supplement to Capcom games of the time. The store also included an audio CD with four vocal tracks from the game: the opening song from Cross Generation of Heroes, "Across the Border", sung by Asami Abe; Ultimate All-Stars' English re-recording of this song, sung by Anna Gholston, with rap by James C. Wilson; and the Japanese and English versions of Roll's theme song composed by Yoshinori Ono.

Capcom's Community Manager Seth Killian expressed satisfaction with the North American sales of Ultimate All-Stars. "[Tatsunoko Vs Capcom] certainly beat the initial expectations. It didn't set any land speed records, but it was a success," Killian stated. "And that's really saying something considering that we're talking about a game that was not only never coming out, but has a title that most people can't even pronounce." In Japan, Ultimate All-Stars sold 18,913 units as of January 2, 2011, and, as of December 27, 2009, Cross Generation of Heroes has sold 62,805 units. Capcom USA's Corporate Officer/Senior Vice-President Christian Svensson revealed in early November 2012 that Capcom's rights with Tatsunoko had lapsed, thus disallowing Capcom to sell Tatsunoko vs. Capcom physically or digitally.

== Reception ==
Tatsunoko vs. Capcom:
Ultimate All-Stars (Wii)

Aggregate scores
Aggregator	Score
GameRankings	85.99%
Metacritic	85/100

Review scores
Publication	Score
Edge	7/10
Eurogamer	8/10
GameSpot	8.5/10
GameSpy	3.5/5
GameTrailers	9.0/10
IGN	9/10
Nintendo Power	9/10
X-Play	5/5

Famitsu's four reviewers each gave Cross Generation of Heroes a score of 8/10. They believed that its variety of characters and its fighting system were strong points, but found its gameplay to be slightly flat, as skilled players are obligated to use Baroque Combos repeatedly. Licensing and resource issues made GameSpot's Ricardo Torres, IGN's John Tanaka, GamesRadar and other critics doubtful that the game would see an international release. Describing the game's cast of licensed characters, Adam Sessler of X-Play stated that "clearing the American rights to show them all in one game would be a logistical nightmare." He also pointed out the largely unknown cast to non-Japanese audiences—a notion IGN's Mark Bozon agreed with. When Ultimate All-Stars debuted at E3 2009, it garnered numerous genre-specific awards, and won the Game Critics Award for "Best Fighting Game".

Ultimate All-Stars received positive reviews, with an average score of 85% on review aggregate sites Metacritic and GameRankings. Critics praised its balance between accessibility and depth; Adam Sessler called it the perfect game for the Wii's demographic, and remarked that it allows "grandmas, kiddies and junkies" to perform intricate combos, while including deeper gameplay mechanics for the "more refined palate". Contrasting the game with previous Vs. titles, GameSpot reviewer Randolph Ramsay stated that its use of fewer buttons "may seem less complex [...], but this simplicity belies the depth of each character's move set." Eurogamer's Matt Edwards believed that, compared to the separate buttons for punches and kicks in Marvel vs. Capcom 2: New Age of Heroes, Tatsunoko vs. Capcom's streamlined approach was moderately easy to learn. Edwards claimed that the game is a "slightly slower and more user-friendly Marvel, without losing the ability to pull-off crazy 50+ hit combos."

Reviewers lauded the variety of Tatsunoko vs. Capcom's graphical presentation and character playstyles. Ben Kuchera of Ars Technica wrote that its over-the-top attacks can be "huge, colorful, screen-filling blasts of light and movement," and that combos "flash across the screen, claiming you landed billions of points of damage." Adam Sessler and 1UP.com's Richard Li found that each character played in a vastly different way; Li explained that there are characters who take advantage of sheer speed and long range moves, others who use momentum to apply pressure to opponents and those who rely on a single opportune moment to deal vast amounts of damage. Heidi Kemps of GamePro contrasted the game with Marvel vs. Capcom 2, and noted that "every combatant in Tatsunoko feels carefully designed to be unique, intriguing, and most importantly, worth investing time into mastering." Bozon, Edwards, and VideoGamer.com's Wesley Yin-Poole believed that the characters were well-animated, and chained attacks together seamlessly.

Li criticized Capcom for not providing an easy alternative to unlock characters since the multiple Arcade mode playthroughs needed to unlock them could be frustrating. Nintendo World Report's Neal Ronaghan mentioned it can get tedious, and echoing Li's sentiment, Ryan Scott of GameSpy complained that "arcade mode needs to be left to die," as multiplayer is the primary reason for playing fighting games. Both Scott and Ramsay thought many of the other unlockables obtainable through Arcade mode didn't offer sufficient value. Reviewers had mixed experiences with its online component; GameDaily's Robert Workman reported that it ran fluidly, but Scott said that the game lagged often enough to be unplayable. Edwards thought "the netcode hasn't shown itself to be particularly sturdy," but the situation may improve as the number of local players increase. Both Bozon and GameTrailers said that performance depends on each player's connection; the latter explained that lag is more likely to occur when playing against a distant opponent.

The game's soundtrack was lauded, with Robert Workman of GameDaily highlighting its "fantastic mix of strong techno tunes and dramatic battle themes." Ramsay cited its "convincing battle effects" and "catchy music"; he believed that the latter complemented the game's dynamic nature and presentation. Bozon and Official Nintendo Magazine's Chris Scullion expressed annoyance with the voice work of the top-down shooter minigame. Bozon explained that three of the four playable characters yell every time they fire.

Critics speculated on the commercial risk of localizing Tatsunoko vs. Capcom for the Wii. Kemps considered it a risky undertaking for Capcom, as the console is not renowned for fighting titles, and as the game abandons the three-on-three matches of the Marvel titles—which popularized the Vs. series—in favor of the two-on-two formula used in the older, more obscure Vs. games. Kemps and Bozon pointed out that the game's Tatsunoko characters are largely unknown to non-Japanese audiences; this caused Bozon to liken the game to a dark horse, as he considered it to be one of the Wii's best titles. Li reported that "Many wondered why Capcom chose Nintendo's Wii as the exclusive platform [...], a multiplatform release would reach a broader audience, critics argued." The game's quality led Yin-Poole to question whether it would stay exclusive to the Wii; he speculated, "Perhaps TvC is a test, then. If it sells even remotely well, maybe we'll see a sequel on Microsoft and Sony's consoles. Or maybe, fingers crossed, it'll add further weight to the case for [Marvel vs. Capcom 3]."

== See also ==
- Tatsunoko Fight, a 2000 fighting video game featuring characters from various Tatsunoko properties
