= Frank West (Dead Rising) =

Video game character

- Dead Rising character
- Frank West as he appears in Dead Rising Deluxe Remaster (2024)
- First game: Dead Rising (2006)
- Created by: Capcom
- Voiced by: English: Terence J. Rotolo (Dead Rising, Dead Rising 2, Off the Record, Marvel vs. Capcom series, Dead Rising 3 (Super Ultra Arcade Remix Hyper Edition EX plus only)); Peter von Gomm (Tatsunoko vs. Capcom: Ultimate All-Stars); Ty Olsson (Dead Rising 4); Scott McNeil (Puzzle Fighter); Jas Patrick (Dead Rising Deluxe Remaster); Japanese: Rikiya Koyama (Ultimate Marvel vs. Capcom 3, Project X Zone)

In-universe information
- Nationality: American

Francis "Frank" Algernon West (Japanese: フランシス・「フランク」・アルジャーノン・ウェスト, Hepburn: Furanshisu `Furanku' Arujānon U~esuto) is a character in Dead Rising, an action-adventure video game series created by the Japanese company Capcom. Frank was first introduced as the player character in Dead Rising (2006). The character was initially conceived as being obese and ugly during the development of the game before its producer Keji Inafune decided that they should be an average looking everyman. During the events of Dead Rising, Frank is a freelance photojournalist who stumbles upon a zombie outbreak and violent psychopaths within a shopping mall in the town of Willamette, Colorado.

Frank is the protagonist of several Dead Rising games and he appears in various Capcom crossover games such as Tatsunoko vs. Capcom: Ultimate All-Stars and Puzzle Fighter. Several actors have portrayed the character in games including Terrence J. Rotolo, Ty Olsson, Jas Patrick, and Rikiya Koyama. He is also portrayed by Rob Riggle in the film Dead Rising: Watchtower.

The character has been well received by video game publications, primarily in the West.

== Concept and design ==
Keiji Inafune, producer of Dead Rising, wanted the main character Frank West to be different from the usual Japanese main character, a young and beautiful protagonist. In the beginning, the staff considered making the character ugly and fat. However, the American branch of Capcom said he was too ugly; Inafune then wanted to create an everyman that looked average rather than beautiful or ugly. His conception as "rough, tough, gritty character" was aimed primarily to attract the Western audience.

== Appearances ==
=== In Dead Rising series ===
Introduced in the first Dead Rising game, Frank West is the player character, a famed freelancer photographer and photojournalist who has covered many world events, wars, and other big stories. Lately, however, his career has begun to fizzle out. Looking for the next big scoop, he stumbles on to some strange events happening in the small town of Willamette, Colorado. There, he winds up in a barricaded shopping mall and attempts to rescue a host of human survivors from the zombie hordes and violent psychopaths laying siege to the mall, while also covering the story.

Frank makes a return as the secondary protagonist of Dead Rising 2: Case West and fights alongside Chuck Greene after rescuing him from Fortune City as they tackle Phenotrans at one of their facilities. In the end, Frank escapes the facility with Chuck, though Isabela Keyes was kidnapped by Dr. Mallon, he has successfully retrieved evidence to help clear Chuck's name in the Fortune City disaster.

Frank reappears in Dead Rising 2: Off the Record, which is an alternate version of the Dead Rising 2 storyline in which Frank is the protagonist. In this version of the story, Frank became an overnight celebrity for his actions in exposing the Willamette incident. Cashing in on his success, Frank released a memoir, hosted a talk-show, and used his fame and money to treat his zombie wounds from Willamette with Zombrex (among other perks). Unfortunately, between his squandered money and a series of scathing scandals, Frank's show was cancelled and his stardom quickly plummeted. In desperation, Frank goes to Fortune City to appear on "Terror is Reality" as a competitor and make some quick money, but is trapped in the city when the zombie outbreak begins. Though at first Frank sees the outbreak as his big comeback, he gradually learns of the terrifying conspiracy behind it and becomes more determined to uncover the truth.

In Dead Rising 3, Frank does not appear in the main story, but is playable in the Dead Rising 3 DLC and can also be found as a statue players can find spread across Los Perdidos.

Frank returns as the protagonist of Dead Rising 4, in which he now works as a college photography teacher and returns to Willamette 16 years after the events of the first game, only to be caught in the middle of another zombie outbreak.

=== Other appearances ===
West is a playable character in the Tatsunoko vs. Capcom: Ultimate All-Stars fighting game, with his special moves revolving around the use of zombies, a helmet based on the Servbot character from Mega Man Legends, and a variety of makeshift weapons from Dead Rising. He is one of six Capcom characters added to the fighting game Ultimate Marvel vs. Capcom 3, a standalone updated version of Marvel vs. Capcom 3: Fate of Two Worlds. His fighting style makes use of the Dead Rising "Level Up" mechanic that gives him access to more moves, stronger attacks, and increased damage resistance the more exp he gains from taking pictures. He is also playable in the game's sequel, Marvel vs. Capcom: Infinite. He also appears as one of the characters at player's disposal in the tactical role-playing game Project X Zone, where he is paired with Hsien-Ko from the Darkstalkers series.

West also appears as a multiplayer character in Capcom's Lost Planet: Extreme Condition, and in the sequel, Lost Planet 2. In Valve's add-on content "The Passing" for Left 4 Dead 2, a message from Frank directed to Otis appears among other pop culture messages graffitied on the wall of a bar.

=== Film ===
West appeared in the live-action film Dead Rising: Watchtower, portrayed by Rob Riggle. Frank can also be seen as several statues hidden in frame.

== Reception ==
In 2008, The Age ranked West as the 22nd greatest Xbox character of all time, while GameDaily ranked him as the 17th best Capcom character of all time in 2008. In 2012, GamesRadar ranked him as the 76th "most memorable, influential, and badass" protagonist in games. UGO Networks included West among the "Top Heroes in Entertainment", placing him as 68th. In 2013, GamesRadar staff included him among the 30 best characters in the three decades of Capcom's history, noting that "Frank has been a fast-rising star within Capcom, appearing in multiple fighting games and cameo roles in the handful of years since his debut." GamesRadar's staff also placed him at number 48 in a list of the 50 best game characters of the generation.

He was listed on Game Informer's "Ten Faces We Won't Soon Forget", with Meagan Marie emphasizing the fact that he is an everyman, saying "Frank West represents that little part in all of us that hopes to survive a zombie apocalypse some day." In 2009, IGN's Jesse Schedeen included Frank West in an "Ultimate Zombie Strike Team". IGN also listed Frank as one of characters they wished to see appear in a future Marvel vs. Capcom title, adding that he "should definitely come equipped with some of the more eclectic toys he picked up in the mall, including his Mega Man gear and lightsaber." He was also featured in a 2010s "Gaming's Most Inappropriate Outfits Ever" by NowGamer. UGO Networks ranked him as fifth "awesomest hidden character" for his appearance in Tatsunoko vs. Capcom, noting the difficulty to unlock the character while West's guest appearance in Left 4 Dead 2 was ranked as first in GamesRadar's 2010 list of best character cameos.
