= Dead Rising 2 =

2010 video game

- Developer: Blue Castle Games (Note: Additional work, development support, and co-developed by Capcom. PlayStation 4 and Xbox One versions ported by Mercenary Technology)
- Publisher: Capcom (Note: Microsoft Game Studios published Case Zero and Case West DLCs.)
- Director: Robyn Wallace
- Producers: Shinsaku Ohara; Josh Bridge; Jason Leigh
- Designers: Hayato Tsuru; Yuji Hayakawa; Toshiya Iwaoka
- Programmers: James Hall; Dee Jay Randall
- Artists: Naru Omori; Dave Taylor
- Writers: Annie Reid; Dan Brady
- Composer: Oleksa Lozowchuk
- Series: Dead Rising
- Platforms: PlayStation 3; Xbox 360; Windows; PlayStation 4; Xbox One
- Release: PlayStation 3, Xbox 360: EU: September 24, 2010; NA: September 28, 2010; AU/JP: September 30, 2010; Windows: NA: September 28, 2010; AU: September 30, 2010; EU: October 1, 2010; JP: October 28, 2010; PlayStation 4, Xbox One: WW: September 13, 2016
- Genre: Action-adventure
- Modes: Single-player, multiplayer

Dead Rising 2 is a 2010 action-adventure game developed by Blue Castle Games and published by Capcom. It was released between September and October 2010 for the PlayStation 3, Xbox 360, and Windows. It is a sequel to Dead Rising, and is the second entry in the series of the same name. The game features a number of new features and improvements to its predecessor, including multiplayer options.

The game's story see players controlling Chuck Greene, a former motocross rider, who finds himself at the center of another zombie outbreak taking place in a casino resort and shopping complex in Nevada, and becomes involved in uncovering the truth behind it. Not only must he survive against the zombies roaming the complex by scavenging weapons and supplies, along with rescuing survivors caught up in the incident and dealing with crazed psychopaths, Chuck must also ensure that his young daughter receives regular treatments of a medication that prevent her from becoming a zombie herself, after being bitten by her mother during a previous outbreak in Las Vegas.

Like the previous game, players must complete major missions to advance the story, but can undertake optional tasks and explore the complex, with various endings available depending on actions taken during the main game.

The game received two downloadable expansions - one being a prologue to the main story, the other taking place moments after achieving its canonical ending. A non-canon reimagining entitled Dead Rising 2: Off the Record was released the following year. As part of Dead Rising's ten year anniversary, a ported version of the game as well as its reimagining was released in September 2016 for PlayStation 4 and Xbox One.

== Gameplay ==
In the game, which is played from a third-person perspective, the player can pick up various melee weapons to defeat a large horde of zombies.

The player controls protagonist Chuck Greene as he fights off hordes of zombies while accomplishing specific missions. The game includes several new objects that can be used to attack the zombies. Up to 7,000 zombies can be seen onscreen at the same time.

Dead Rising 2 allows players to manufacture their own custom weapons at various points in the game by collecting items and combining them together in maintenance rooms scattered across the game map. The player also has the ability to unlock "combo cards" that reveal weapons that can be combined together. Such combinations include the "Hail Mary", a hand grenade duct taped to a football, "Dynameat", a stick of dynamite duct taped to a piece of meat, the "Paddlesaw", two chainsaws duct taped to a kayak paddle, and "Spiked Bat" which is a baseball bat with nails hammered through.

Like the first game, boss fights are represented by 'psychopaths', people who have either been driven insane by the zombie outbreak or are taking advantage of it to fulfill their cruel desires.

=== Multiplayer ===
During the 2009 Tokyo Game Show, Capcom revealed that the multiplayer of Dead Rising 2 takes the form of the in-game reality TV show "Terror Is Reality" in which players will act as contestants in a fictional gameshow. Four players participate in multiplayer, competing against each other for the most kills inside an arena full of undead. Players can use weapons and vehicles including human-sized hamster balls and chainsaw-equipped motorcycles. They also will be able to prevent other players from scoring by using various forms of "dirty" tactics.

Chuck Greene joins the reality pay-per-view gameshow "Terror Is Reality" (TIR) to get money for his daughter's Zombrex. (Zombrex being a medicine which prevents infected humans from turning into zombies as long as it is taken once daily.) Terror Is Reality is hosted by Tyrone "TK" King. Players compete with players all over the world online, and earn money for their character at the same time. The show consists of three minigames, including "Zomboni" (driving a car that makes zombie juice and players have to shoot the juice to the target to get points), "Bounty Hunter" (players snipe zombies and they can earn extra points by hitting the jackpot), "Stand Up Zomedy" (players put flowers, sticks, and dresses on the zombie, earn more points by getting all three of items in one zombie), and so on. Finally, the major game in TIR is "Slicecycle", where players drive motorcycles to slice up zombies for points. The winners and participants get money for their participation points from the games.

It was confirmed during Captivate '10 that cooperative gameplay for the story campaign will be available and according to Blue Castle Games there will be an online co-op mode. Both players will play as the main character, Chuck Greene, and will be able to earn experience and keep the items they collected throughout the game—but only the host player will be able to save the game's progress. A host can invite a friend to join the current game by sending out an invitation; if the friend accepts, a confirmation icon will be displayed and the host can allow the player to join in. Non-host players can drop in/out of a co-op game anytime they like. When the players become separated, a tiny animated Chuck Greene icon will appear at the bottom of the game screen. The icon will show what the other player is up to—attacking, being assaulted by zombies, etc. If a player is taken down by zombies, he will be able to call the other for help to revive them. The player will use food to revive the dying partner before his health runs out.

== Plot ==
Five years after the events of Dead Rising, former motocross champion Chuck Greene is in the casino town of Fortune City, Nevada, taking part in Terror Is Reality, a controversial sports entertainment game show where contestants kill zombies for money and fame. Chuck needs the prize money to buy Zombrex, a daily medication that suppresses the zombification process, for his young daughter, Katey; who was bitten by her zombified mother during a previous outbreak in Las Vegas.

While Chuck is backstage, the show's supply of zombies are released; Chuck rescues Katey and makes his way to an emergency shelter, which is sealed after their arrival. Head of security, Raymond Sullivan is initially reluctant to let the infected Katey in, but Chuck promises to keep her supplied with Zombrex until the military arrives in three days. Chuck ventures into the city to find a dose of Zombrex. Another survivor, Stacey Forsythe, a leader of a zombie rights organization protesting their treatment by Terror Is Reality, gives Chuck a map and two-way radio. She watches the shelter's security monitors and directs Chuck to other survivors or points of interest in the area.

After giving Katey the first dose of Zombrex, a news report implicates Chuck as causing the outbreak. Chuck tracks down the reporter Rebecca Chang at a nearby hotel and offers her a story if he can prove his innocence. From this Chuck is given three main objectives to complete: investigating the source of the outbreak; rescuing survivors from zombies; and finding more Zombrex to keep Katey alive until the military arrives. Chuck and Rebecca soon discover that Terror Is Reality host, Tyrone "TK" King, is using the outbreak to rob the city's casinos. Chuck foils the robberies and prevents TK from escaping in his helicopter. TK is locked up in the shelter, before revealing he's collaborating with another organization to cause the outbreak.

Three days into the outbreak, the military arrives, but a green gas emanates from underground, causing the zombies to mutate into a more powerful form. The unprepared convoy is wiped out almost completely. A second military force would normally arrive 24 hours later, but media reports claim that the first convoy reached the shelter and found no survivors, so the city will be cleansed by firebombing. The safe house is sabotaged, forcing Chuck to quickly repair the door; TK is bitten, and needs Zombrex to survive. Rebecca reveals the source of the gas is in the underground access tunnels.

Chuck discovers a facility belonging to Phenotrans, the pharmaceutical company responsible for Zombrex, harvesting zombies. Zombrex is manufactured from the queens of the genetically modified wasps which create zombies; driving up demand for Zombrex. Phenotrans also released the gas to increase the number of queens in a zombie horde. Killing the facility's scientists, Chuck recovers a satellite phone and a laptop and takes them to Rebecca as proof of Phenotrans involvement.

Rebecca attempts to contact her news station, but is killed by Sullivan, who is revealed as a Phenotrans operative; being the one who let the zombies loose and framed Chuck, as well as sabotaging the shelter. Stealing the evidence, Sullivan is pursued and confronted by Chuck on a casino rooftop. Sullivan plans to escape by skyhook during which Sullivan reveals Phenotrans was behind the outbreak where Chuck's wife was zombified and Katey was infected, infuriating him. Fighting Sullivan, Chuck handcuffs his harness to the rooftop, bisecting Sullivan as the recovery aircraft catches the skyhook.

Chuck contacts Rebecca's channel and offers to give them proof of Phenotrans' involvement in the outbreak if they send helicopters to rescue the survivors. As the helicopter picks them up, if TK was not given Zombrex, he zombifies and attacks the group, forcing Chuck to sacrifice himself to allow the others to escape. If TK was given Zombrex, he kidnaps Stacey and Katey and suspends them above a horde of zombies while challenging Chuck to a final duel. Chuck hurls TK to his death, before leaving with Katey and Stacey.

== Development and release ==
Dead Rising 2 was announced on February 9, 2009, confirming earlier rumors of the game's existence, as well as a viral video for the game. The developers Blue Castle Games worked with Keiji Inafune, the original Dead Rising producer and Capcom's former global head of research and development, along with other original Dead Rising team members.

=== Promotion ===
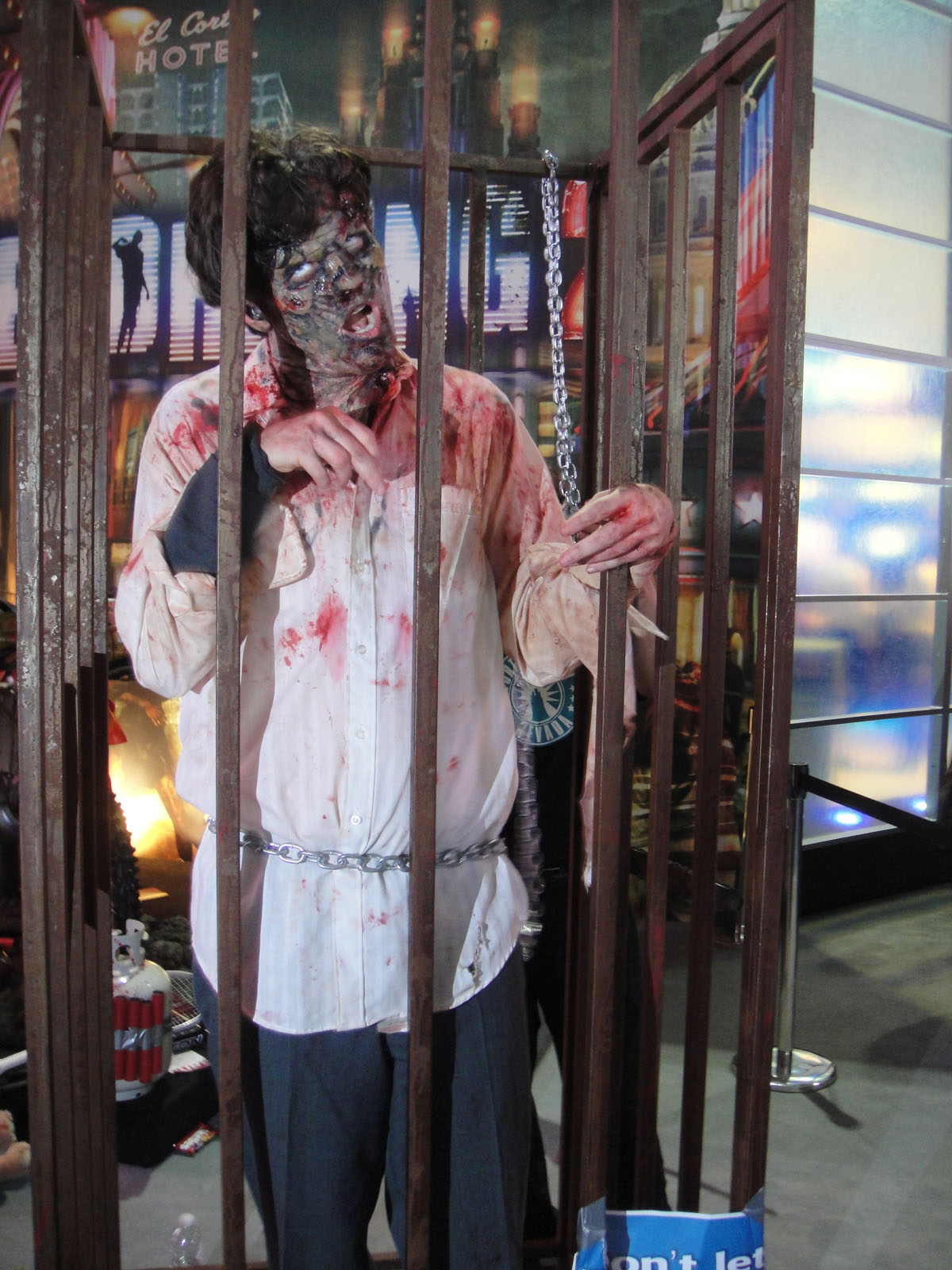
Promotion at E3 2010

Capcom created a variety of websites before the release of the game. These include TapeitorDie.Com, visitfortunecity.com, and deadrising-2.com.

In August 2010, Keiji Inafune released an eight-part video series entitled Zombrex: Dead Rising Sun. Capcom sponsored a gathering of zombies at the London House of Parliament on August 30— the best dressed won a game console. Attendees also received a limited edition, one-of-a-kind T-shirt.

Capcom also created Citizens for Undead Rights and Equality (CURE) as a marketing tie-in for the game, as well as its reimagining Dead Rising 2: Off the Record. The group is a parody of the political party system in Britain.

=== Retail editions ===
Dead Rising 2 was released in several retail versions. The standard edition includes the game and a manual and is available for the PlayStation 3, Xbox 360, and Windows.

- The Zombrex edition in North America and PAL regions is only available for the PlayStation 3 and Xbox 360, The North American edition includes a fake syringe of the Zombrex medicine featured in the game (functioning as a pen), along with an accompanying safety information card, a Zombrex-labeled steel case, a sales brochure, and a prescription pad. The PlayStation 3 version contains a voucher for a Dead Rising 2 XrossMediaBar dynamic theme and a behind the scenes featurette, whereas the Xbox 360 version comes with the Zombrex Dead Rising Sun movie. The Zombrex Edition was also released in PAL regions, containing the Zombrex steel case, fake syringe pen and a making-of DVD.
- The Outbreak Pack, available for any system, but exclusive to Europe, features a red box and contains a zombie figurine and some accessories for the figurine. A limited run of 700 copies was also announced for Australia.
- The High Stakes Edition is available exclusively in the Capcom store, and contains a poker set, a Fortune City visitor map, a Terror Is Reality XVII admission ticket, and a chance to win a 6 ft gold bust of the zombie statue.

== Downloadable content ==
=== Case Zero ===
Reception

Aggregate score
Aggregator	Score
Metacritic	X360: 79/100

Review scores
Publication	Score
Eurogamer	7/10
Game Informer	8.75/10
GameSpot	8/10
GameTrailers	7.1
IGN	6.5
Joystiq	4/5

Dead Rising 2: Case Zero is the prequel for Dead Rising 2, and is set shortly after Chuck and Katey escape from the Las Vegas zombie outbreak. The player must deal with a minor outbreak in the town of Still Creek, and move on before the military arrives and kills any infected (including non-zombies like Katey). The player can reach up to level five in Case Zero, with the level and any combo cards earned able to be transferred into the main game.

Case Zero was released by Blue Castle Games and Microsoft Game Studios for the Xbox 360 on August 31, 2010 in North America and Europe, then in Japan at a later date because the Computer Entertainment Rating Organization was concerned about the content and the download's rating. The game is region-locked to these specific areas, and cannot be downloaded outside these regions. In the game's first week of release, 300,000 downloads were made: the fastest selling game on Xbox Live Arcade. On September 15, Capcom announced that Case Zero had received more than 500,000 downloads.

Reception for Case Zero has been generally favorable, receiving an average score of 79 on Metacritic. IGN gave the title a 6.5 out of 10 rating, criticizing the load times and the lack of things to do. GameSpot gave the title an 8 out of 10 rating, praising the fun zombie killing, in-depth weapon creation, and multiple endings that require several playthroughs. Joystiq gave the title a 4 out of 5 star rating, and recommended the game to anyone because of both the content and the price. Eurogamer gave the title a 7 out of 10 rating, criticizing many annoyances but praising the overall product.

=== Case West ===
Reception

Aggregate score
Aggregator	Score
Metacritic	X360: 74/100

Review scores
Publication	Score
Eurogamer	8/10
Game Informer	8/10
GameSpot	7
GameTrailers	7.9
IGN	8.5

On September 15, 2010, Capcom and Microsoft Game Studios announced a second downloadable episode for the Xbox 360, titled Dead Rising 2: Case West, made available on the Xbox Live Marketplace. The game features Frank West, the main character from the first Dead Rising game, and serves as the canon Overtime Mode of Dead Rising 2, with Frank teaming up with Chuck to further investigate the link between Phenotrans and the Fortune City zombie outbreak, and find proof that clears Chuck of any wrongdoing.

The story follows on from Ending A of the main game, with Frank rescuing Chuck from the elevator. Frank was going to meet Rebecca Chang to investigate a Phenotrans facility west of Fortune City, but learns from Chuck that she was killed by Phenotrans mole Sullivan. Although initially suspicious of Chuck because of the media reports blaming him for the Fortune City outbreak, Frank lets the motocross star come with him to find proof that Phenotrans was behind the outbreak.

Case West includes cooperative play for two players, with each taking control of one of the two characters. The episode features new challenges, enemies, items, and combo weapons. The photography element returns from the first Dead Rising; the characters use this to generate proof of Phenotrans' part in the zombie outbreaks. Case West was released on December 27, 2010 for the Xbox 360 in North America.

Case West received generally positive reviews, with a score of 74 on Metacritic. IGN gave the title an 8.5 out of 10 rating, with praise for the story, combo weapons, and fun co-op mode. Eurogamer gave the title an 8 out of 10 rating, stating that the product was more a worthwhile purchase for people planning to play co-op with a friend. GameTrailers awarded the title with a 7.9 out of 10 rating, saying that the $10 asking price was worth it. GameSpot gave the title a 7 out of 10 rating, praising the new weapons, fun while rescuing survivors, wacky humor, and plenty of replay value, but criticizing the similarity it has to Case Zero, the lack of integration with previous games, and that the photography in the game has less impact than in Dead Rising.

== Remake ==
At Captivate 2011, Capcom's annual press show, the company announced that it was releasing Dead Rising 2: Off the Record, as a reinterpretation of the game with Frank West from the original Dead Rising as the main character. The game was released for the same consoles on October 11 in North America, October 13 in Japan, and October 14 in Europe for a discount retail price.

Off the Record is intended as a complete reimagining of Dead Rising 2, with new missions, cutscenes, environments, enemies, and weapons. The photography mechanic from the first Dead Rising is also included. There are technical and system upgrades, such as optimization of loading times and improved network performance. Off the Record also features a new sandbox mode. This allows players to explore Fortune City without the obstacle of time. Off The Record has received mostly positive reviews, with the changes and additions both praised and panned.

On September 13, 2016, Capcom re-released Off the Record alongside Dead Rising and Dead Rising 2 on PlayStation 4 and Xbox One to coincide with the tenth anniversary of the series.

== Reception ==
Reception

Aggregate score
Aggregator	Score
Metacritic	(PC) 78/100 (PS3) 80/100 (X360) 79/100

Review scores
Publication	Score
1Up.com	B+
Eurogamer	8/10
G4	4/5
Game Informer	9.5/10
GamePro	4.5/5
GameRevolution	B+
GameSpot	8.5/10
GameSpy	4/5
GamesTM	7/10
GameTrailers	8.1/10
IGN	8.0/10
TeamXbox	7.6/10

Dead Rising 2 received "generally favorable" reviews, according to review aggregator website Metacritic.

GameZone gave the Xbox 360 version of the game a 6 out of 10, stating, "the lackluster presentation, uninspired story, outright broken multiplayer, and atrocious amount of glitches makes Dead Rising 2 less of a flawed gem and more of a somewhat polished pile that incrementally smells worse the longer you let it sit in your disc drive."

Game Informer gave the game a 9.5 out of 10, stating, "Even after playing for dozens of hours, you'll still find new things in Dead Rising 2. I won't spoil anything, but there's a lot of variety to be found in the game beyond obvious things like the number of objects that can be used as bludgeons. This game is designed for multiple playthroughs, and I'm looking forward to each and every one of them."

In February 2011, Capcom announced that the title had sold more than 2.2 million copies worldwide.

As of March 31, 2024, the game had sold 3.20 million copies worldwide.

== Sequel ==
Dead Rising 3 is a 2013 action-adventure game developed by Capcom Vancouver and published by Microsoft Studios. The game was announced as an Xbox One launch title during Microsoft's E3 2013 press conference on June 10, 2013. It was released on November 22, 2013.
