= Alyson Court =

Canadian actress

- Born: Alyson Stephanie Court; November 9, 1973 (age 53); Toronto, Ontario, Canada
- Occupation: Actress
- Years active: 1984–present
- Television: The Big Comfy Couch; Mr. Dressup
- Spouses: Erik Suzuki (m. 2000; div. 2005) Z.M. Thomas (m. 2019)
- Children: 1

Alyson Stephanie Court (born November 9, 1973) is a Canadian actress. She began her career as a child actress, her first television role was as herself in Mr. Dressup (1984–1994), and later made her first film role as Ruthie in Sesame Street Presents: Follow That Bird (1985). Court continued to appear in educational productions, landing the lead role of Loonette the Clown on the series The Big Comfy Couch (1993–2002).

As a voice actress, Court has appeared in several animated series, mostly notably as Lydia Deetz in Beetlejuice (1989–1991) and Jubilee in X-Men: The Animated Series (1992–1997). She was also the original voice of Claire Redfield in the Resident Evil franchise, voicing the character for all of her appearances from Resident Evil 2 (1998) to Resident Evil: Operation Raccoon City (2012).

== Early life ==
Alyson Stephanie Court was born on November 9, 1973 in Toronto, Ontario, Canada to a mother who ran the Canadian Opera Company.

== Career ==
=== Television roles ===
Court first appeared as Ruthie in Sesame Street Presents: Follow That Bird and later as herself in Mr. Dressup in 1984. In 1988, she was in the pilot for the series My Secret Identity as Caroline, neighbor to Jerry O'Connell's character. Court played Loonette the Clown, the main character of the series The Big Comfy Couch, for the first six seasons before leaving the show to focus on raising her child.

From 2000 to 2003, Court was the host of the morning children's programming block on CBC, Get Set for Life (now CBC Kids).

Court appeared in This Hour Has 22 Minutes (season 24, episode 3), a Canadian television show where she reprised her role as Loonette the Clown in a comedic sketch on the 2016 clown epidemic.

=== Voice acting ===
Court voiced summer camper Dawn in the 1986 animated film Care Bears Movie II: A New Generation and Emily Elizabeth in the Clifford's Fun with... videotape series from 1988 to the early 1990s. Among her animated series voice acting roles are Malani the Ewok in the animated television program Star Wars: Ewoks (her first animated role when she was 11), and Lydia Deetz (originally played by Winona Ryder) in the animated adaptation of the 1988 film Beetlejuice. She voiced Terri Cloth on The Garbage Pail Kids animated series of 1987–1988. In 1992, she voiced Jubilee in X-Men: The Animated Series and Nora Mouse in the animated series Timothy Goes to School. She was also voice of Trina Riffin in the Cartoon Network/Teletoon series Grojband, Malani the Ewok in Ewoks, Amber in Silver Surfer, Megan Clark in The Amazing Spiez!, Wendy Wyndlee in Inspector Gadget, Arkayna Goodfey/Mysticon Dragon Mage in the Nickelodeon/YTV series Mysticons, Queen Martha in the Nick Jr. Channel program Mike the Knight and Poodle in the YTV program Almost Naked Animals. During 2006 and 2007, she was the voice of Dahlia in the animated series Skyland. She voices Coco in the animated show Urban Vermin, and was the voice of Pixx in the animated show Ultraforce. She also voiced Windy Woo from The Naughty Naughty Pets. She recently voiced Abscissa in X-Men '97.

In video games, she provided the voice of Claire Redfield in Resident Evil 2, Resident Evil – Code: Veronica, Resident Evil: Degeneration, Resident Evil: The Darkside Chronicles, and Resident Evil: Operation Raccoon City. Court did not reprise her role as Claire in Resident Evil: Revelations 2 or the 2019 remake of Resident Evil 2, as she sounded too young to voice the older mature Claire in the former and the third-party localization team overseeing voice acting/motion capture chose to go with non-union voice actors for the latter. In addition, she directed the voice-over and motion-capture portions of the spin-off title Resident Evil Outbreak, which did not feature Claire. In addition to voice acting, Court was also involved in the localization process of several Capcom games in North America. Among the most noteworthy were Mega Man X5 in 2001, in which she was directly responsible for the decision to rename the initial eight Maverick bosses to reference members of Guns N' Roses, meant as a tribute for her then husband's love for the band. In 1998, Court reprised her role as Jubilee in Marvel vs. Capcom: Clash of Super Heroes.

== Personal life ==
Court married Erik Suzuki, a former Capcom voice and video game localization director, in 2000. They divorced in 2005. Court has a son named Blaede. In March 2018, Court became engaged to comic book creator Z.M. Thomas. On July 1, 2019, Court announced her marriage to Thomas.

== Filmography ==
=== Live-action ===
==== Film ====
Year	Title	Role	Notes
1985	Sesame Street Presents: Follow That Bird	Ruthie	
1986	My Pet Monster	Melanie	Direct-to-video
1987	Rolling Vengeance	Allison Rosso	
1991	South of Wawa	Shannon	
1997	The Count of Monte Cristo	—N/a	Direct-to-video
1998	Jerry and Tom	Jacki	
2007	Look Both Ways	Associate producer	Short film
2011	Sunny Skies	—N/a	Short film
2012	Retreat	—N/a	Short film
2012	Him Indoors	Executive producer	Short film
2018	The Joke Thief	Margaret Fellows	

==== Television ====
Year	Title	Role	Notes
1984–94	Mr. Dressup	Herself	
1985	The Edison Twins	Alison	Episode: "Robbers and Robots"
1985	Pippi Longstocking	Annika Settergen	ABC Weekend Special film
1986	Rockit Records	—N/a	Put Pilot (CBC)
1986	Rosie	Sarah Dawson	2 episodes
1987	Home Alone: A Kid's Guide to Playing it Safe When On Your Own	Alyson	Direct-to-video special
1987	Stranger in My Bed	Joan Slater	Television film
1988	Blades of Courage	Kyra Laroche	Television film
1988	Drop-Out Mother	Caroline Cromwell	Television film
1988, 1991	My Secret Identity	Caroline	2 episodes
1989	The Twilight Zone	Beverly	Episode: "The Mind of Simon Foster"
1990	Avonlea	Margie Purdie	Episode: "Malcolm and the Baby"
1990	Lantern Hill	Agnes Ripley	Television film
1990	Basil Hears a Noise	Additional characters	Television film
1993–2002	The Big Comfy Couch	Loonette the Clown	78 episodes
1997	Elvis Meets Nixon	Priscilla Presley	Television film
1997	Groundling Marsh	The Ice Wind	Episode: "Crystal and the Ice Wind"
1998	Once a Thief	Cleo Redford	Episode: "Politics of Love"
1998	The Last Don II	Fumigator Actress	2 episodes
2000–03	Get Set for Life	Herself	
2001	Haven	Bernice	Television film
2011	The Being Frank Show	—N/a	Episode: #1.21
2012–14	Mia and Me	Elf Girl	26 episodes
2016	Murdoch Mysteries	Mrs. Candace Riley	Episode: "House of Industry"
2016	This Hour Has 22 Minutes	Loonette the Clown	Episode for October 18, 2016

=== Voice-over roles ===
==== Film ====
Year	Title	Role	Notes
1986	Care Bears Movie II: A New Generation	Dawn	
1986	Madballs: Escape from Orb	Sandy	Direct-to-video
1987	Care Bears Adventures in Wonderland	Princess	
1988	Clifford's Fun With...	Emily Elizabeth	Direct-to-video series
1996	The Toy Shop	Katherine	Direct-to-video
2008	Resident Evil: Degeneration	Claire Redfield	CG Film

==== Anime ====
Year	Title	Role	Notes
2007–12	Bakugan Battle Brawlers	Miyoko Kuso, Tayghen, Mira, Soon	189 episodes

==== Animation ====
Year	Title	Role	Notes
1985–86	Ewoks	Malani	Recurring role (Season 1 only)
1986	The Care Bears Family	Various voices	13 episodes
1987	My Pet Monster	Jill Smith	5 episodes
1987	Garbage Pail Kids	Terri Cloth, Belle Button, Lois Lamebrain, Fay Hooray	12 episodes
1987	The New Archies	Veronica Lodge	13 episodes
1989–91	Beetlejuice	Lydia Deetz (voice)	94 episodes
1991	Bill & Ted's Excellent Adventures	Additional voices	8 episodes
1992–97	X-Men: The Animated Series	Jubilation Lee/Jubilee	48 episodes
1994–95	Free Willy	Lucille	20 episodes
1994	Tales from the Cryptkeeper	Kirsten	Episode: "The Avenging Phantom/Myth Conceptions"
1995	Spider-Man: The Animated Series	Jubilation Lee/Jubilee	2 episodes
1995	Ultraforce	Pixx	2 episodes
1998	Silver Surfer	Amber	Episode: "The Origin of the Silver Surfer: Part 2"
1998	Mythic Warriors: Guardians of the Legend	Delona	26 episodes
1998–2000	Noddy	Island Princess	21 episodes
1998–2000	The Powerpuff Girls	Additional voices	16 episodes
1999–02	Tweenies	Bella	US version
1999–03	Redwall	Myrtle	10 episodes
2000–01	Timothy Goes to School	Nora Mouse	7 episodes
2000, 2003	Monster by Mistake	Miranda Bell	2 episodes
2001–03	Braceface	Additional voices	3 episodes
2002–03	Moville Mysteries	Alyssa Dryden, Donna	2 episodes
2006	The Naughty Naughty Pets	Windy Woo	
2006–07	Spider Riders	Aqune, Portia	
2006–07	Skyland	Dahlia	Recurring role
2007	Friends and Heroes	Diana	12 episodes
2007	Urban Vermin	Coco	
2008	Gotta Catch Santa Claus	Trainee Elf	Television film
2008	Z-Squad	Chaney, Zora	
2008–09	Willa's Wild Life	Lara, Tiffy Tootie	2 episodes
2009	Angora Napkin	Beatrice	Television film
2009	Franny's Feet	Meena the Butterfly	
2009, 2010	The Dating Guy	Brie	2 episodes
2009–11	Producing Parker	Penelope	
2009–12	The Amazing Spiez!	Megan Clark	Main role
2010	Caillou	Ms. Lauren Shelley	Episode: "Butterfly Surprise/Soccer Trouble/You're Not Miss Martin!"
2010–11	Turbo Dogs	Additional voices	2 episodes
2011–13	Almost Naked Animals	Poodle	8 episodes
2011–13	Mike the Knight	Queen Martha	16 episodes
2013–15	Grojband	Trina Riffin	26 episodes
2013	Ella the Elephant	E.L. Weathers	Episode: "Tiki's Quest"
2014	Wishenpoof!	Bianca's Mom	Episode: "Pilot"
2015–18	Inspector Gadget	Wendy Wyndlee, Tourist #2, Corsetta Camisole, Detective Data, Malicious	10 episodes
2016	Looped	Sarah Doover	Episode: "Balanced Breakfast"
2017–18	Mysticons	Arkayna Goodfey, Dragon Mage, Elven Daughter, Binky, The Mask	Main role
2019	Total Dramarama	Princess Ephemera	Episode: "Soother or Later"
2020	Parallel Parker	Parker, Science Parker	Main role on Toonavision
2020	Powerbirds	Bella	Episode: "No One Like You"
2024	X-Men '97	Abscissa	Episode: "Motendo"

==== Video games ====
Year	Title	Voice role	Notes
1998	Marvel vs. Capcom: Clash of Super Heroes	Jubilee	
1998	Resident Evil 2	Claire Redfield	
2000	Resident Evil – Code: Veronica	Claire Redfield	
2000	Spawn: In the Demon's Hand	Tiffany	
2009	Resident Evil: The Darkside Chronicles	Claire Redfield	
2012	Resident Evil: Operation Raccoon City	Claire Redfield	

== Production work ==
=== Voice director ===
Year	Title	Notes
2002	Onimusha 2: Samurai's Destiny	Video game (uncredited)
2003	Resident Evil Outbreak	Video game
2017–2018	The Magic School Bus Rides Again	29 episodes
2018	Cupcake & Dino: General Services	13 episodes
2020–2022	Blue's Clues & You!	30 episodes
2022	Transformers: BotBots	10 episodes
2022	My Little Pony: Tell Your Tale	4 episodes
2022–2023	Pinkalicious & Peterrific	7 episodes
2024–2025	Let's Go, Bananas!	26 episodes

=== Motion-capture director ===
Year	Title	Notes
2003	Resident Evil Outbreak	Video game
2004	Resident Evil Outbreak: File #2	Video game
