= Resident Evil: Welcome to Raccoon City =

2021 film by Johannes Roberts

- Theatrical release poster
- Directed by: Johannes Roberts
- Written by: Johannes Roberts
- Based on: Resident Evil by Capcom
- Produced by: James Harris; Robert Kulzer; Hartley Gorenstein
- Starring: Kaya Scodelario; Hannah John-Kamen; Robbie Amell; Tom Hopper; Avan Jogia; Donal Logue; Neal McDonough
- Cinematography: Maxime Alexandre
- Edited by: Dev Singh
- Music by: Mark Korven
- Production companies: Constantin Film International; Davis Raccoon Films; The Fyzz Facility; The Tea Shop and Film Company
- Distributed by: Screen Gems (through Sony Pictures Releasing; United States/United Kingdom); Constantin Film (Germany); Metropolitan Filmexport (France)
- Release dates: November 19, 2021 (Paris); November 24, 2021 (United States); November 25, 2021 (Germany); December 3, 2021 (United Kingdom)
- Running time: 107 minutes
- Countries: United States; Germany; United Kingdom
- Language: English
- Budget: $25 million
- Box office: $42 million

Resident Evil: Welcome to Raccoon City is a 2021 action horror film based on the Resident Evil video game series by Capcom. It is the seventh live-action film of the Resident Evil film series, and serves as a reboot. Written and directed by Johannes Roberts, the film stars Kaya Scodelario, Hannah John-Kamen, Robbie Amell, Tom Hopper, Avan Jogia, Donal Logue, and Neal McDonough. Set in 1998 and primarily adapting the first and second games, it follows a group of survivors during a zombie outbreak in Raccoon City. It is the first live-action film in the series not to feature Milla Jovovich in the lead role of her character Alice.

Development took place in early 2017, after Resident Evil: The Final Chapter was released, with producer James Wan expressing interest in the project. Later, Constantin Film chairman Martin Moszkowicz said that a reboot of the film series was in development. In the same month, Wan was called to produce the reboot with a script by Greg Russo; subsequently, Roberts was hired as both writer and director and both Wan and Russo left the project. Principal photography took place in Ontario, Canada from October to December 2020, followed by reshoots in May 2021.

Resident Evil: Welcome to Raccoon City had its world premiere at the Grand Rex in Paris on November 19, 2021, and was theatrically released on November 24, 2021, in the United States by Sony Pictures Releasing. The film grossed $42 million worldwide on a $25 million budget and received mixed reviews. Another reboot, Resident Evil, was released on September 18, 2026.

== Plot ==
In the 1980s, Claire Redfield and her older brother Chris live at the Raccoon City Orphanage. Claire befriends Lisa Trevor, a disfigured girl experimented on by Dr. William Birkin, an employee of the Umbrella Corporation who uses children in his research. Claire eventually escapes the orphanage.

In 1998, Claire returns to Raccoon City by hitchhiking in a semi-truck. After the driver accidentally hits a woman who disappears, his Dobermann licks her blood and gradually becomes erratic. At a diner, rookie police officer Leon S. Kennedy notices the owner bleeding from her eyes. Claire warns Chris about Umbrella's experiments, citing journalist Ben Bertolucci as her source. After Chris leaves, a child fleeing his mother breaks into the house; both are erratic and bloody, forcing Claire to escape.

At the police station, the STARS Alpha team meets Chief Brian Irons, who explains that the Bravo team disappeared while investigating a death at the remote Spencer Mansion. The Alpha team—Chris, Jill Valentine, Richard Aiken, Brad Vickers, and Albert Wesker—is sent to investigate. Unknown to the others, Wesker is secretly working for an unidentified party and has been ordered to steal William's virus. Inside the mansion, the team encounters zombies eating the Bravo team's bodies. Brad is bitten and crashes the helicopter, while Richard is killed. Chris and Jill escape through a secret passage that Wesker unlocked.

The truck driver, infected by his dog, transforms into a zombie and crashes outside the police station. Chief Irons attempts to flee the city but is fired upon by Umbrella guards trying to contain the outbreak, forcing him to return. Claire and Leon find Bertolucci locked in a cell, but he is bitten by a zombie inmate as the station becomes overrun. Leon, Claire, and Irons escape to the Orphanage in search of a secret Umbrella tunnel leading to the mansion.

A Licker kills Irons and attacks Leon, but Lisa saves him. Recognizing Claire, she gives them the keys to the secret passage. They discover an underground laboratory where Umbrella has experimented on children. Wesker confronts William and his family there, killing William's wife in self-defense during a shootout. Jill shoots Wesker, who appears to die but tells her to escape by underground train before Umbrella destroys the city. William injects himself with the "G-Virus" and mutates.

Chris, Jill, Claire, Leon, and William's daughter Sherry board the train, but it derails when Raccoon City is destroyed, allowing a monstrous William to reach them. Leon kills the creature with a rocket launcher. Although the Corporation reports zero civilian survivors, the five emerge from the train tunnel and leave Raccoon City behind.

In the mid-credits scene, Wesker awakens inside a body bag, unable to see. A mysterious woman gives him sunglasses and introduces herself as Ada Wong.

== Cast ==
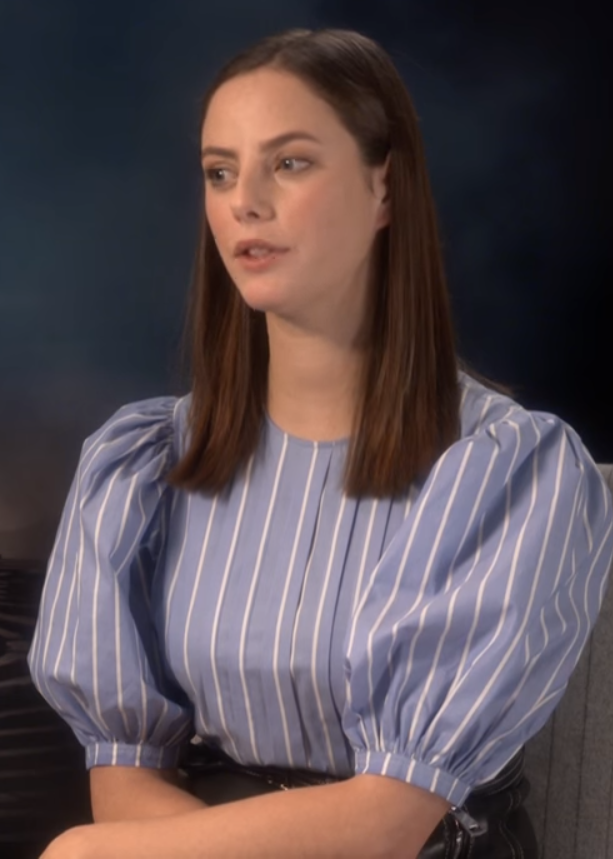
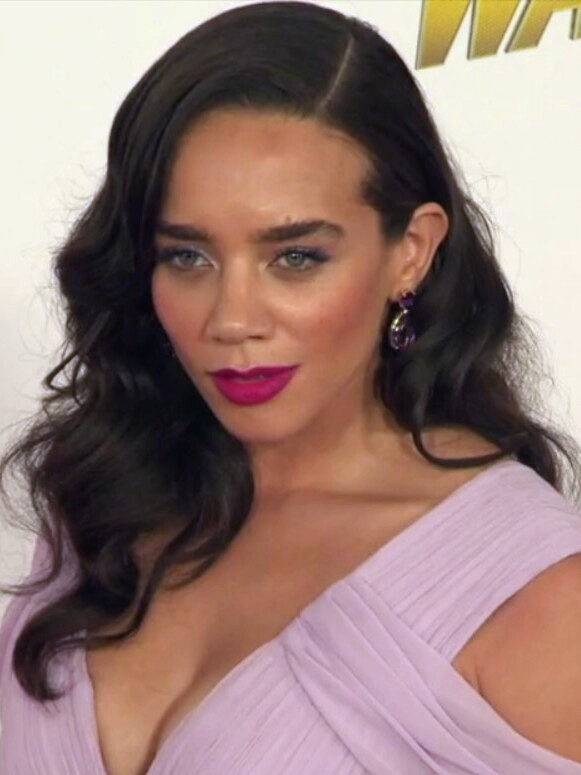
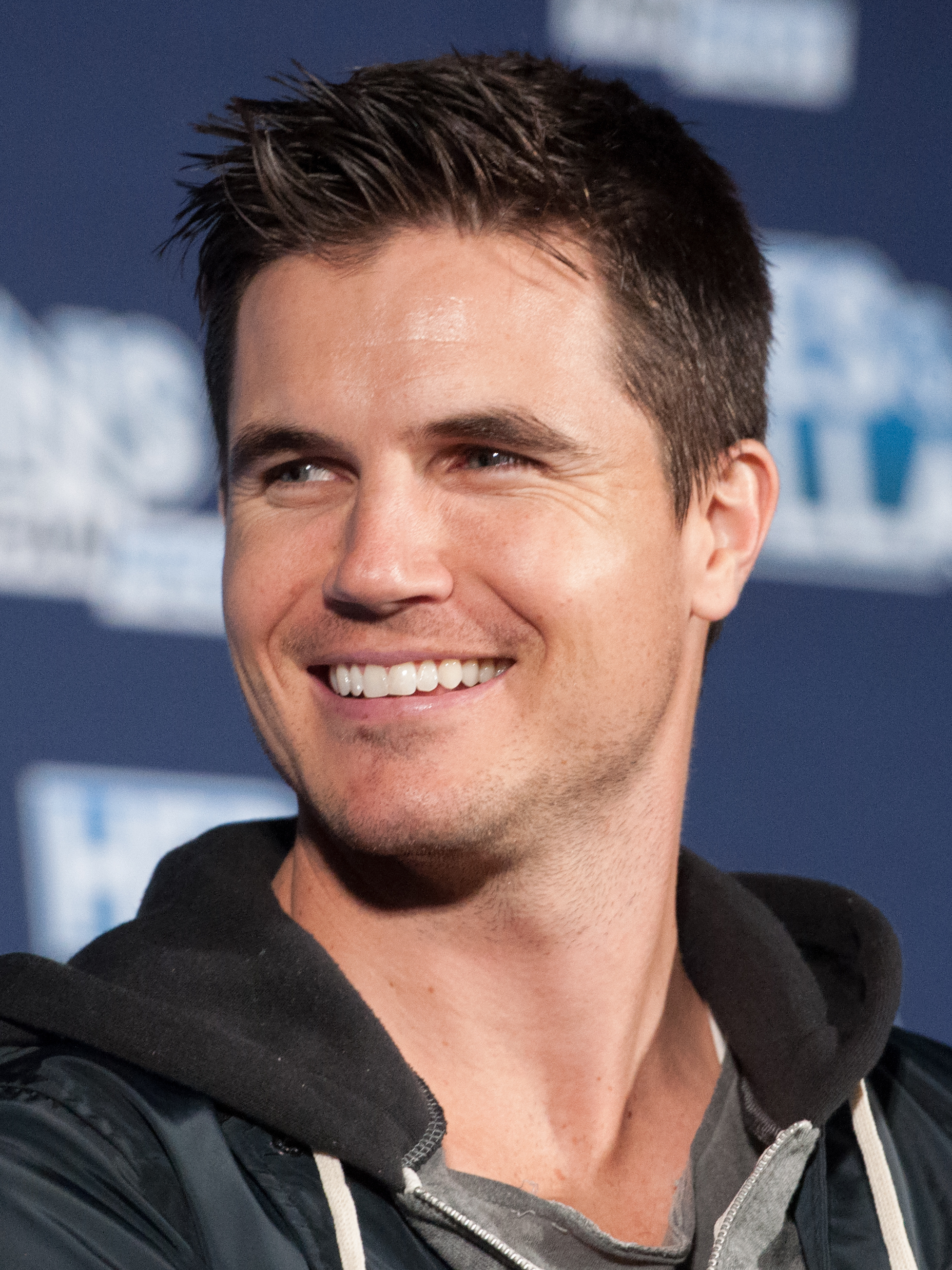
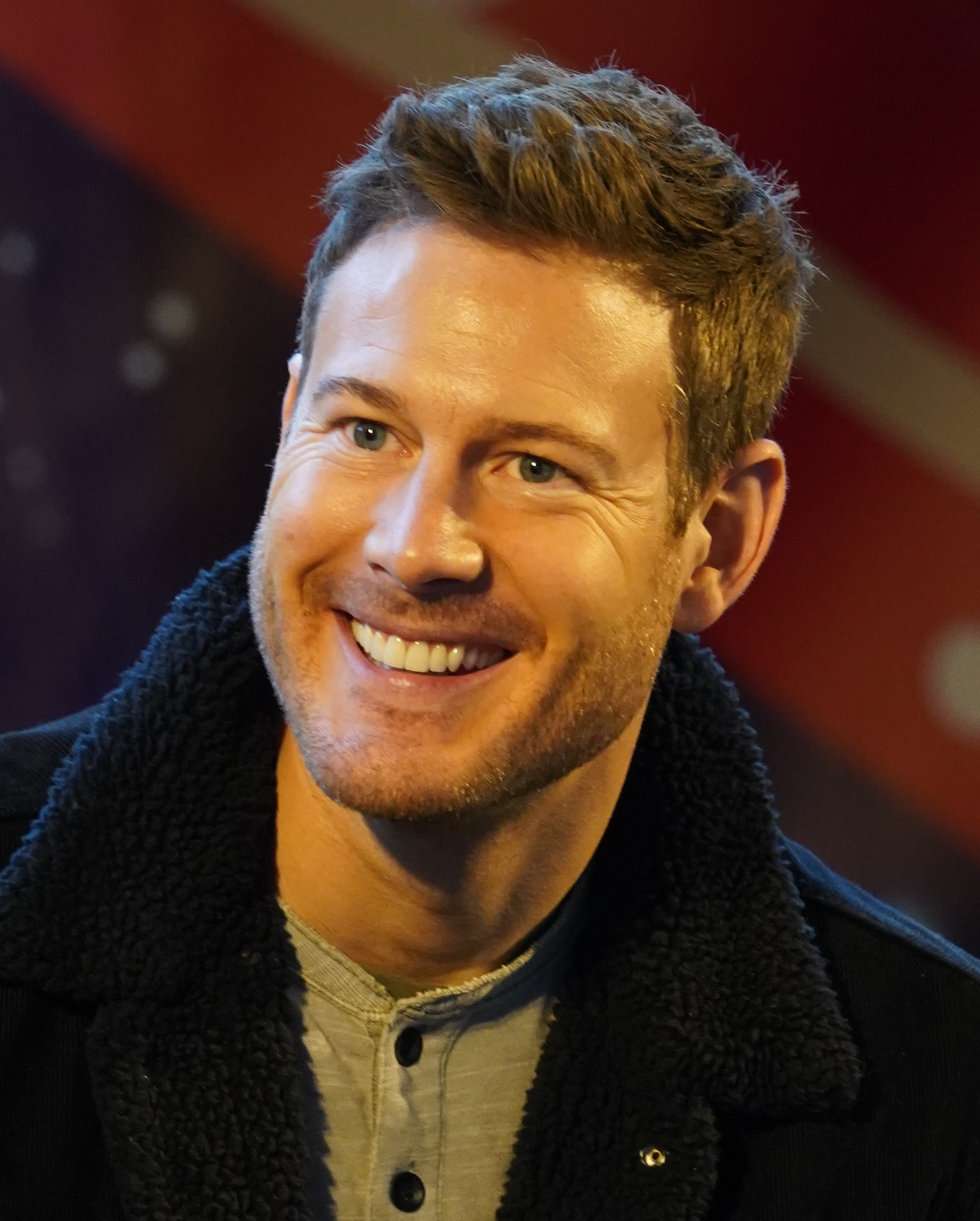
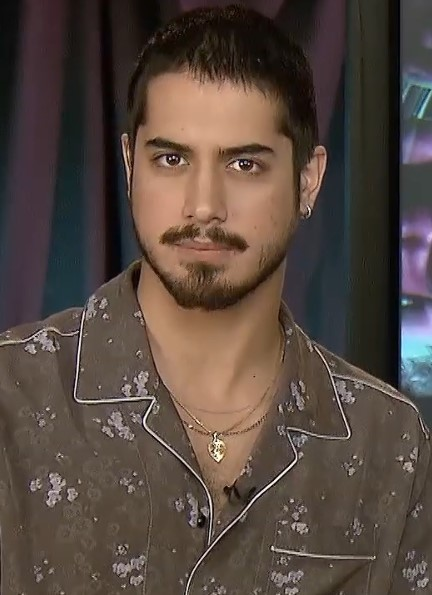
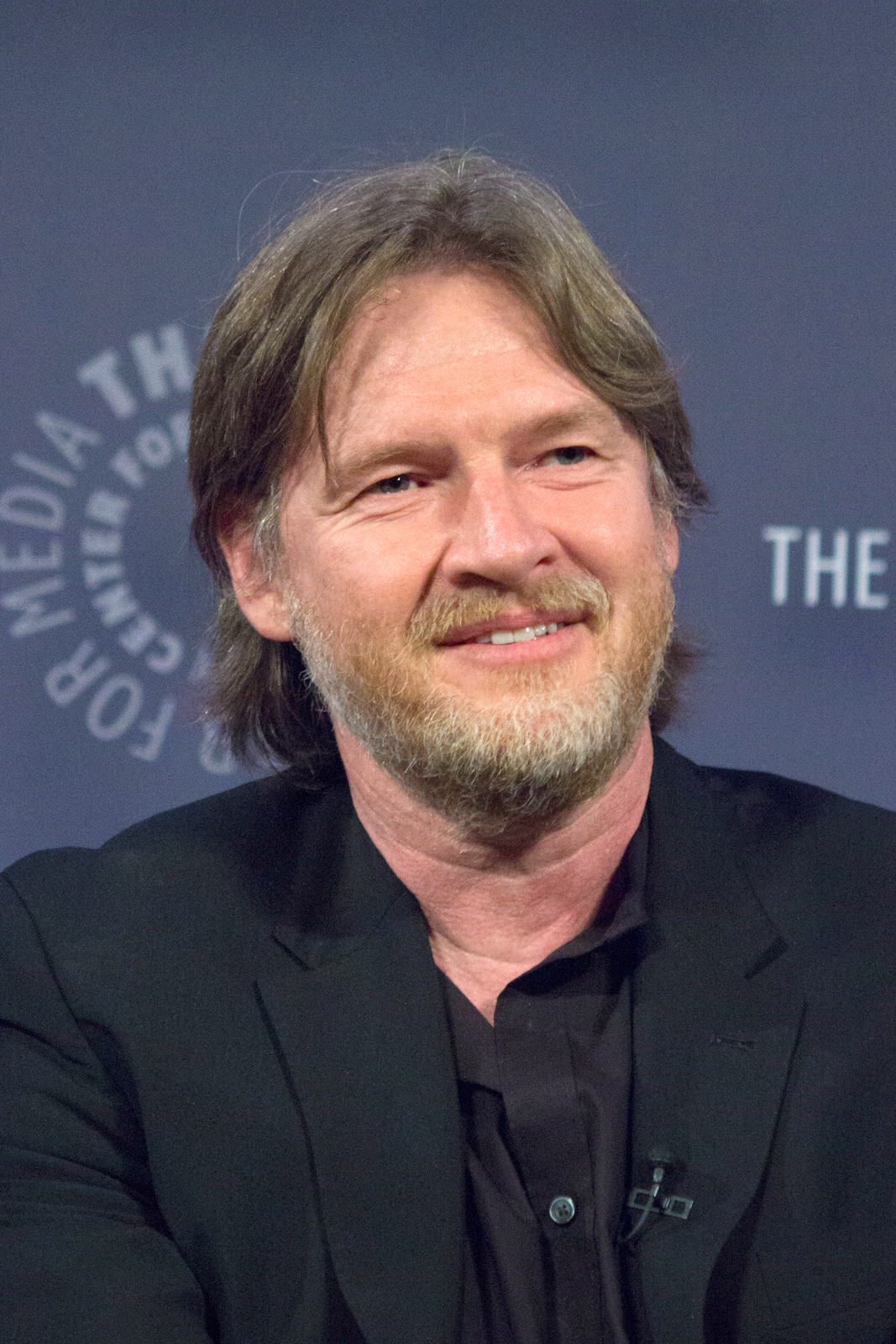
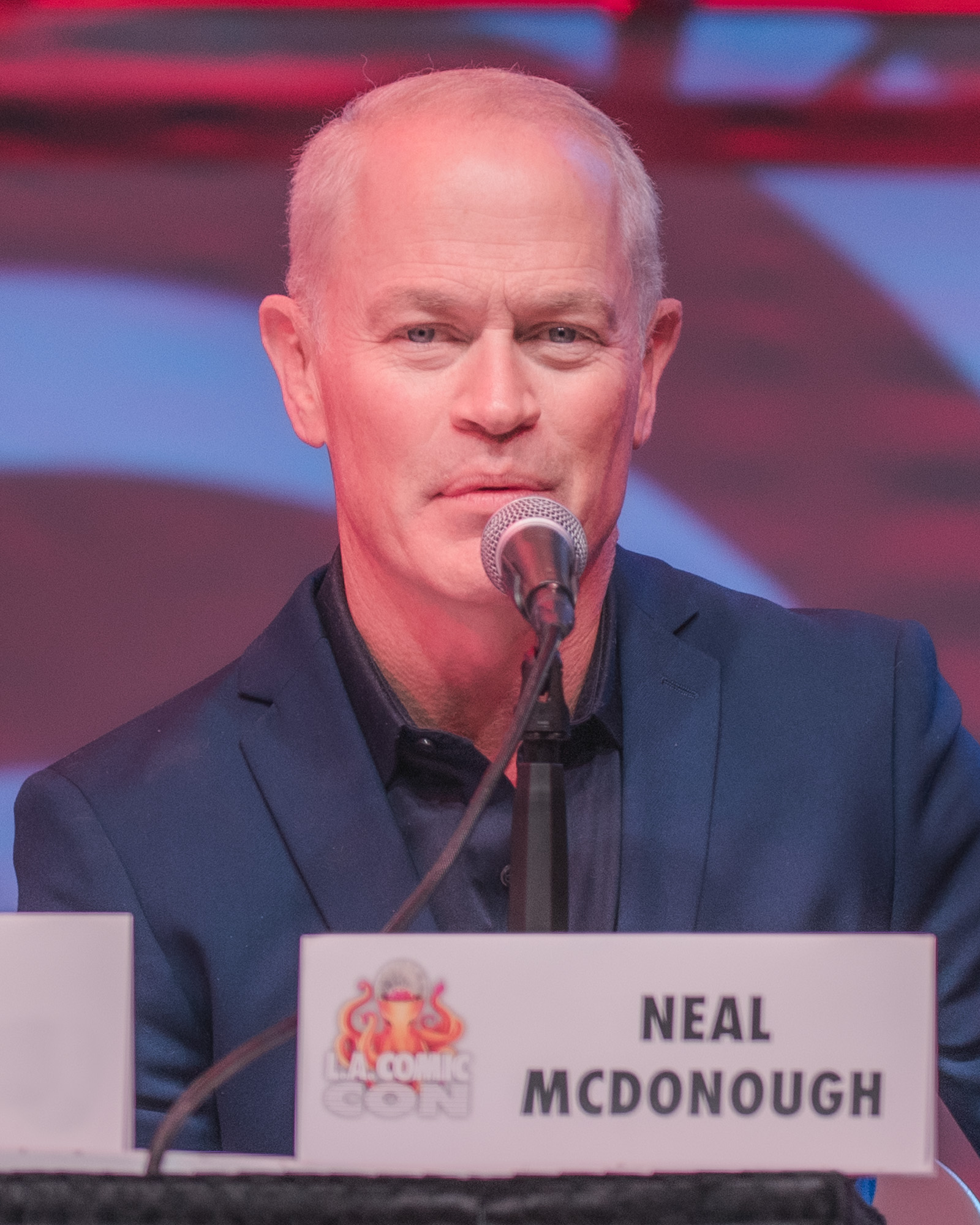
The film's cast includes Kaya Scodelario as Claire Redfield, Hannah John-Kamen as Jill Valentine, Robbie Amell as Chris Redfield, Tom Hopper as Albert Wesker, Avan Jogia as Leon Kennedy, Donal Logue as Chief Brian Irons and Neal McDonough as William Birkin.
- Kaya Scodelario as Claire Redfield, Chris's estranged younger sister who is investigating the Umbrella Corporation
  - Lily Gail Reid as young Claire
- Hannah John-Kamen as Jill Valentine, a member of the STARS (Special Tactics And Rescue Service) Alpha Team and Chris's partner
- Robbie Amell as Chris Redfield, Claire's estranged older brother and a member of the STARS Alpha Team who is dispatched to investigate the Spencer Mansion
  - Daxton Grey Gujral as young Chris
- Tom Hopper as Albert Wesker, a member of the STARS Alpha Team who is working as a double agent for a rival company
- Avan Jogia as Leon Kennedy, a Raccoon City Police Department (RPD) rookie who teams up with Claire and Irons to escape the city
- Donal Logue as Chief Irons, the RPD's chief of police
- Neal McDonough as William Birkin, one of the leaders of Umbrella's experiments
- Lily Gao as Ada Wong, a mysterious spy, during a mid-credits scene
- Chad Rook as Richard Aiken
- Marina Mazepa as Lisa Trevor, one of Umbrella's experiments
- Nathan Dales as Brad Vickers
- Josh Cruddas as Ben Bertolucci, a conspiracy theorist investigating the Umbrella Corporation
- Pat Thornton as the truck driver, a man who helps Claire
- Holly De Barros as Sherry Birkin, the daughter of William and Annette
- Janet Porter as Annette Birkin, William's wife
- Dylan Taylor as Kevin Dooley
- Sammy Azero as Enrico Marini

== Production ==
=== Writing ===
==== Greg Russo's version ====
Pre-production took place in early 2017 while Resident Evil: The Final Chapter was still in theatres, with Constantin Film chairman Martin Moszkowicz saying that a reboot of the series was in development, and producer James Wan expressing interest in the project. Greg Russo was attached as writer in 2017. Russo, who was also attached to write the script for Mortal Kombat (2021) at the time, worked with Wan in creating a Resident Evil story he considered to be "brutal and horrifying", and drew inspiration from the 2017 video game Resident Evil 7: Biohazard, though he would later clarify he only drew on the tones of the game—"scary, isolated, alone"—rather than the story itself. Russo wanted Moonlight Sonata, a composition featured in several Resident Evil games, to feature in the opening credits. Constantin was unimpressed with this script, feeling the game was too recent and its potential failure could harm film sales. Seeking alternate story ideas, Constantin proposed the incorporation at one point of a time travel subplot. Ultimately, Wan and Russo decided to leave the project citing creative differences and their departures were confirmed in December 2018.

==== Johannes Roberts' version ====
What I loved about the games was that they were just scary, and that's a lot of what I wanted, that atmosphere. It's raining constantly, it's dark, it's scary, Raccoon City is a rotten character. I wanted to put [it] and mix it with the fun side, especially with the narrative style of the first game. We had a lot of fun, we even used the fixed angles that the first game has when the characters are at Spencer Mansion.

— Johannes Roberts

In December 2018, it was announced that Johannes Roberts was attached to write and direct the film. In August 2019, Roberts told Screen Rant that the reboot would be "super, super scary" and more faithful to the games than the previous films. In a statement to Deadline Hollywood, Roberts said the film would be based on Resident Evil (1996) and Resident Evil 2 (1998).

Roberts said he wanted to give the film a darker tone. Inspired by John Carpenter's films, including Halloween, Assault on Precinct 13, and The Fog, the filmmaker explained that the story was divided between two main locations: Spencer Mansion from the first game and the Raccoon Police Department, which first appeared in Resident Evil 2. Roberts chose the tone for the remake of the second game as a model for the film. Although director Paul W. S. Anderson and Milla Jovovich released six commercially successful films based on the games between 2002 and 2017, Roberts emphasized that his version was different from the series that preceded it:

It's a totally separate story that is based on the roots of the game and the world of terror. I fell in love with Milla Jovovich, that first film is a lot of fun... but it was a real pleasure to get the reins of a new franchise. I had never seen the horror and atmosphere of the games [in the movies], what I felt when I was playing those games or watching from behind the shoulders of people playing games. I never felt it on the screen, and this is something I wanted to tell you about.

In early drafts, the screenplay was ambitious, incorporating a variety of mutants from the first two games into the narrative even if only passively. The story was from the start intended as an ensemble piece comparable to Resident Evil: Apocalypse, following several major characters in the film as their paths converge. Over the course of 2019 and 2020, the film script was repeatedly altered, keeping the main story but removing a number of CG-heavy elements, condensing the supporting cast and tweaking the protagonists' arcs. Earlier drafts also included more original characters, monsters and locations from the games, before Roberts had to make changes to his script after the budget was cut from $40 million to $25 million. Some of the cuts and changes were made so late that most of the concept artwork done by Daniel Carrasco for the monsters to be featured was finished, including Hunters, Chimeras, Crimson Heads, Pale Heads, giant spiders, Neptune (giant shark), Tyrant (aka Mr. X), and others.

Originally, Claire and Chris had no connection with Birkin or Ben Bertolucci, this was added later to help streamline the story after other script changes. The characters were also closer to their original video game versions; Jill was not written as a reckless wildcard and Claire was not a conspiracy theorist who already knew of Umbrella's intentions. Barry Burton, Rebecca Chambers and other characters from the games were originally in the scripts, and some had death scenes written for them. Some of the action scenes were cut down or changed, mostly due to budget cuts, such as a scene where Lisa Trevor sacrifices herself attacking Birkin while everyone else escapes on the train.

=== Casting ===
In early 2020, casting was underway but was delayed by the COVID-19 pandemic. On October 6, Deadline Hollywood reported that Scodelario and Hannah John-Kamen had been cast as Claire Redfield and Jill Valentine, alongside Robbie Amell, Tom Hopper, Avan Jogia, and Neal McDonough as Chris Redfield, Albert Wesker, Leon S. Kennedy, and William Birkin, respectively. That November, Donal Logue was cast as Chief Brian Irons, alongside Chad Rook as Richard Aiken, and Lily Gao as Ada Wong.

In Japan, Capcom later confirmed the characters will be dubbed by voice actors different from the Anderson films. For example, Chris and Claire are voiced by Subaru Kimura and Fairouz Ai instead of Hiroki Tōchi and Hiroe Oka.

=== Filming ===
Principal photography began in Greater Sudbury, Ontario, Canada, on October 17, 2020, with Maxime Alexandre serving as cinematographer. Filming was completed on December 24, 2020. In March 2021, Roberts revealed the full title as Resident Evil: Welcome to Raccoon City. In May 2021, Amell revealed that the film was undergoing reshoots in Toronto and Hamilton.

== Music ==
The film score was composed by Mark Korven. Soundtrack was released by Milan Records and Sony Classical from the date the film aired.

== Release ==
=== Marketing ===
Official images of the film were released on August 31, 2021, and were met with a mixed response. A trailer was released on October 7, 2021, and was met with mixed reaction from fans, who praised its faithfulness to the first two games, but criticized its casting and special effects. Prior to the film's release, the characters were criticized by Metro based on the film's trailer, who called them "bad cosplay" and further said that their acting was "too authentic to the games". Summarizing the film's marketing results, RelishMix said fans of the franchise noticed Milla Jovovich absence while "questioning the logic, the look of the effects, and comparing the film to the game's CGI."

=== Theatrical ===
Resident Evil: Welcome to Raccoon City had its world premiere at the Grand Rex in Paris, France, on November 19, 2021, and was theatrically released on November 24, 2021, by Sony Pictures Releasing in the United States. It was delayed from its original release dates of September 3 and 9, 2021. The film was a modest financial success.

=== Home media ===
Resident Evil: Welcome to Raccoon City was released on video-on-demand on December 21, 2021, and was the top-rented film on Vudu during its first weekend. The film was released on DVD, Blu-ray and Ultra HD Blu-ray on February 8, 2022, by Sony Pictures Home Entertainment. The film grossed over $3.6 million from North America video sales.

== Reception ==
=== Box office ===
Resident Evil: Welcome to Raccoon City grossed $17 million in the United States and Canada, and $25 million in other territories, for a worldwide total of $42 million.

In the United States and Canada, the film was released alongside House of Gucci and Encanto, and was projected to gross $8–10 million from 2,803 theaters over its five-day opening weekend. The film opened nationwide on Wednesday, November 24, 2021, and made $2.5 million on its first day—including $935,000 from Tuesday night previews—from a total of 225,000 theater admissions. The film went on to make $8.85 million in its first five days, placing fifth. Audiences were 64% male as well as 68% between the ages of 18 and 34. In its second weekend, the film earned $2.69 million. In its third, the film made $1.66 million and finished sixth at the box office. The film was tenth in its fourth weekend, earning $316,480 from 719 theaters.

Outside the U.S. and Canada, the film earned $5.1 million from 15 markets in its opening weekend. It made $4.2 million in its second weekend and $2.3 million in its third. In Thailand, the film earned $253,735 from the box office. Japan was the film's highest-grossing foreign market, contributing $5.1 million from the box office.

=== Critical response ===
On the review aggregator website Rotten Tomatoes, 30% of 92 critics' reviews are positive, with an average rating of 5/10. The website's consensus reads: "Resident Evil: Welcome to Raccoon City is an affectionately faithful adaptation that further proves its source material is ill-suited to the big screen." Metacritic, which uses a weighted average, assigned the film a score of 44 out of 100, based on 21 critics, indicating "mixed or average" reviews. Audiences polled by CinemaScore gave the film an average grade of "C+" on an A+ to F scale, while those at PostTrak gave it a 61% positive score, with 48% saying they would definitely recommend it.

In a positive review, Johnny Oleksinski from the New York Post gave 3 out of 4 stars and said the film is "empty-headed good fun that's blessedly under two hours and has just enough character development to make you kind of care when someone gets bitten". Ferdosa Abdi from Screen Rant called it a "fun and faithful adaptation of the games", but felt it was "lacking in character substance". Sean Keane from CNET praised the film: "Despite the lack of scares, minor tweaks to the games' lore and overall silliness, director Johannes Roberts' love for Resident Evil is clear in every moment of Welcome to Raccoon City. With a barrage of Easter eggs and fascinating takes on classic characters, the film's a gleeful trip back to the Spencer Mansion and Raccoon Police Department aimed squarely at fans."

Taylor Lyles of IGN gave the film a 6/10 score, explaining, "Director Mr. Roberts does deserve some credit for sticking much more closely to the source material than the Paul W. S. Anderson films, but a short runtime, a rushed third act, and lack of elements to make it truly scary to watch in the dark hold it back immensely. Nevertheless, it should serve as decent fun for fans." In a mixed review, Mark Hanson from SLANT wrote "Roberts clearly establishes the hauntingly depressed industrial environment of Raccoon City while methodically spacing out his zombie attacks, which, while not especially innovative, at times put a pit in your stomach like the Resident Evil games do."

Charles Bramesco from The A.V. Club gave the film a C+ and called it "totally bereft of the visual distinction or creative personality that often made its predecessors intriguing diamonds in the rough". Nick Schager from Variety criticized the "bevy of unexplained details, dropped subplots, paper-thin characterizations and fright-free mayhem". Kimberly Myers from the Los Angeles Times also gave a negative review, noting the film "may reward longtime fans of the video games by returning to the series' origins, but others will find themselves wanting to leave town, much like the movie's characters".

Rotten Tomatoes lists the film on its 100 Best Zombie Movies, Ranked by Tomatometer.

== Franchise ==
=== Cancelled sequels ===
Director Johannes Roberts stated that if a sequel were to be developed, he would like to adapt the story from Resident Evil – Code: Veronica—referenced in the film with an appearance of the Ashford Twins—and then Resident Evil 4. He also expressed interest in adapting Resident Evil 7: Biohazard and Resident Evil Village in the future.

Robbie Amell stated he hoped to return as Chris in a sequel that included his boulder-punching scene from Resident Evil 5. By June 2022, Tom Hopper confirmed Sony and Constantin Film were pleased with the film's success on video-on-demand and said he hoped to play Albert Wesker again.

By October 2022, the film was one of several projects confirmed by executive producer Martin Moszkowicz to be in development alongside another television series which would have replaced Netflix's series cancelled two months prior, though the exact details were not given, and Moszkowicz was skeptical of films being released for theatres if not projected to be successful.

In April 2023, Raccoon HG Film Productions, which financed Welcome to Raccoon City, received a grant of CA$2 million from the Northern Ontario Heritage Fund Corporation for the production of a film titled Resident Evil: The Umbrella Chronicles. Greater Sudbury was picked as the principal film location. According to Jeff Sneider, the studio was looking at Zach Cregger to direct the new film.

=== Reboot ===
In January 2025, it was reported that Cregger was writing and directing a new film reboot, to be co-produced by Constantin Film and PlayStation Productions. In March 2025, Sony Pictures won a bidding war to secure the rights to the Resident Evil franchise, including its upcoming untitled project, with Columbia Pictures serving as the film's new distributor and Austin Abrams in talks to star. Sony has set a release date of September 18, 2026, for the project. On September 17, 2025 Paul Walter Hauser was cast in a role. The next month, Zach Cherry, Kali Reis and Johnno Wilson were cast in roles with Cherry as a scientist and Reis as an ex-military character that was originally written for a male actor.

== See also ==
- List of films based on video games
