= William Birkin =

- Resident Evil character
- William Birkin in Resident Evil 2 (2019)
- First appearance: Resident Evil 2 (1998)
- Portrayed by: Neal McDonough (Welcome to Raccoon City)
- Voiced by: English; Diego Matamoros (1998 game); Terence J. Rotolo (Umbrella Chronicles, Darkside Chronicles, Operation Raccoon City, 2019 remake); Japanese; Toshihiko Seki (Operation Raccoon City, Zero HD remaster, 2019 remake)

In-universe information
- Spouse: Annette Birkin
- Children: Sherry Birkin

William Birkin is a character in Capcom's Resident Evil survival horror video game series. Introduced in 1998's Resident Evil 2, he is a scientist employed by the Umbrella Corporation who develops the fictional G-virus and serves as one of the game's principal antagonists. After being mortally wounded by Umbrella operatives attempting to seize his research, Birkin injects himself with the virus and undergoes a succession of increasingly inhuman mutations, recurring throughout the game as a boss. His daughter, Sherry Birkin, is also central to the game's story.

Birkin was retained from an abandoned early version of Resident Evil 2, retrospectively known as Resident Evil 1.5, although his mutation and role were substantially developed for the finished game. He subsequently appeared in games revisiting the events surrounding Raccoon City, including Resident Evil: The Darkside Chronicles and Resident Evil: Operation Raccoon City, and was redesigned for the 2019 remake of Resident Evil 2. Neal McDonough portrayed a reinterpreted version of Birkin in the 2021 film Resident Evil: Welcome to Raccoon City.

Birkin has received particular attention from academics and scholars about the use of horror themes in video games. His progressive transformations have been discussed as an example of the mad scientist archetype translated into gameplay, while other academic readings have associated his character with anxieties surrounding genetic experimentation, reproduction, and the economic and social uncertainty of 1990s Japan.

== Concept and design ==
William Birkin and his daughter Sherry originated during development of an earlier version of Resident Evil 2, commonly called Resident Evil 1.5. Although much of that version's cast, locations and story were discarded when development restarted, both Birkins survived the restructuring. In the abandoned version, William likewise transformed into a monster and pursued Sherry, although his mutation was considerably simpler than in the completed game. His body was nevertheless intended to grow in response to damage, anticipating the succession of forms used in the final version.

Birkin's transformations differs from many individual monsters in the series by taking place over a succession of boss encounters. He starts off as a recognizably human figure with an enlarged muscular arm and conspicuous shoulder eye, gradually progressing into forms with additional limbs and increasingly obscured human anatomy, and eventually culminating in a largely amorphous creature. The 2019 remake retained the character's progressive mutations while depicting them with substantially greater anatomical detail.

Diego Matamoros provided Birkin's English voice in the original 1998 game, where he was credited as "Diego Matamores". Terence J. Rotolo provided Birkin's English voice and motion-capture performance in the 2019 remake.

== Appearances ==
=== In video games ===
Birkin first appears in Resident Evil 2 as an Umbrella Corporation scientist responsible for developing the G-virus. Planning to remove his research from Umbrella's control, he is confronted by a company security team sent to recover the virus. After being shot and critically wounded, Birkin injects himself with the remaining sample, which heals his injuries while transforming him into a mutated creature. His attack on the operatives results in samples of the T-virus being released into the sewers, contributing to the wider outbreak in Raccoon City.

As his mutations progress, Birkin repeatedly encounters the game's protagonists, Leon S. Kennedy and Claire Redfield. He also pursues Sherry, whose familial relationship with him makes her a suitable genetic host for the G-virus's reproductive process. Sherry is eventually infected before Claire and Annette Birkin obtain a means of treating her, while William continues mutating until his final form is destroyed during the survivors' escape from the city.

Birkin appears in the 2002 prequel Resident Evil Zero, where he and Albert Wesker observe the outbreak at a former Umbrella training facility. The game further depicts their association within Umbrella and Birkin's decision to continue his G-virus research while Wesker prepares to leave the corporation.

Resident Evil: The Darkside Chronicles (2009) retells the events of Resident Evil 2 in an on-rails shooter format. Its Raccoon City scenario again depicts Birkin pursuing Leon, Claire and Sherry through several stages of his mutation, with both Birkin and the T-103 Tyrant recurring as boss encounters. The spin-off Resident Evil: Operation Raccoon City (2012) instead depicts the Umbrella operation to recover Birkin's research from the perspective of company operatives, who encounter him shortly after his infection with the G-virus. The 2019 remake of Resident Evil 2 retains Birkin's principal narrative role and repeated mutations, while altering the presentation and staging of several encounters.

=== In film ===
Birkin appears in the 2021 live-action film Resident Evil: Welcome to Raccoon City, portrayed by Neal McDonough. The film combines elements of the first two Resident Evil games and substantially changes Birkin's relationship with several characters. He is depicted as a scientist associated with the Raccoon City orphanage where Claire and Chris Redfield grew up, and the film establishes a paternal relationship between him and Chris in addition to his own family with Annette and Sherry. After being wounded during the outbreak, Birkin injects himself with the G-virus and mutates.

The final, fully mutated form of protagonist Bryan in the film Resident Evil (2026) derives visually from elements of William Birkin's G-Virus transformation in Resident Evil 2.

== Reception and analysis ==
William Birkin and his G-virus mutations have frequently been included in retrospective assessments of the series' antagonists and monsters. Writing retrospectively about the original Resident Evil 2, Retro Gamer features editor Nick Thorpe highlighted the progressive destruction of Birkin's humanity as one of the game's memorable monster concepts. Thorpe described the G-virus as transforming Birkin from a recognizable scientist into increasingly grotesque forms, while noting that his continued connection to Sherry gives the encounters a familial dimension beyond their function as boss battles. Aaron Potter of Den of Geek praised the 2019 remake's depiction of his deteriorating body and argued that Birkin's continued cries for his wife and daughter preserve a trace of humanity that gives the battles an emotional quality beyond their grotesque appearance. Mike Wilson of Bloody Disgusting rated Birkin among the series' most memorable villains, emphasizing the progression of his mutations across both versions of Resident Evil 2 and the escalating confrontations that culminate during the characters' escape.

Bernard Perron discussed Birkin's transformations as an example of how video game horror combines bodily mutation with escalating mechanical difficulty, allowing each new stage of a monster to function as a more formidable boss encounter. Perron used Birkin as an example of the series' tendency to make mutation visible through increasingly distorted anatomy, treating the succession of his forms as both grotesque spectacle and a structural escalation in gameplay. Media historian Eugen Pfister examined Birkin as an example of the traditional mad scientist archetype being adapted to the interactive structure of video games. In Pfister's analysis, Birkin's scientific transgression does not remain solely part of the narrative: by using the G-virus on himself, the scientist is transformed into the physical obstacle that the player must repeatedly confront. Each defeat produces a more powerful and less recognizably human body, allowing the consequences of uncontrolled scientific experimentation to be expressed through both narrative and game mechanics. Pfister has additionally identified Birkin as an influential precedent for later antagonists in the series that closely repeats elements of Birkin's narrative and gameplay model, an example being Alexia Ashford, the scientist and principal antagonist of Resident Evil – Code: Veronica. Pfister observed that both are researchers who experiment with viruses, use their work on themselves and return in progressively more monstrous forms as repeated boss encounters.

Rachael Hutchinson, writing in Japanese Culture Through Videogames, interprets Birkin within a broader pattern of bioethical anxiety in the series. She connects the G-virus's reproductive mechanism and Birkin's pursuit of Sherry with contemporary debates surrounding assisted reproduction, abortion and genetic manipulation. Hutchinson also reads Birkin's transformation as a visual judgement on the mad scientist, in which the researcher becomes the product of his own experimentation and his unstable body embodies the dangers associated with the technologies he helped create. Josef Tichý approaches Birkin from a different cultural perspective, describing him as one of the important characters through which Resident Evil 2 communicates an atmosphere of paranoia and uncertainty. Tichý points to Birkin's distrust of Umbrella, his efforts to keep control of his research and his dealings with corrupt institutions in Raccoon City as expressions of wider anxiety within the game. He relates this atmosphere to the social and economic uncertainty of Japan during the 1990s following the collapse of the country's asset price bubble. Matthew Weise of the Singapore-MIT GAMBIT Game Lab interpreted Birkin through the sexual and reproductive imagery of Resident Evil 2. Weise compared Claire's protection of Sherry against her mutated father with the relationship between Ripley and Newt in Aliens, and argued that the G-virus's reproductive mechanics make Birkin's pursuit of his daughter an intentionally disturbing form of body horror.

In his review of the 2021 live-action adaptation, Phil Hornshaw of GameSpot considered the altered relationships involving Birkin among its more potentially interesting ideas, particularly the implication that he had acted as a father figure to Chris Redfield. Hornshaw argued, however, that the film spent too little time developing its characters for this relationship to acquire the dramatic importance it might otherwise have had.
