= Claire Redfield =

Resident Evil character

- Claire Redfield in Resident Evil 2 (2019)
- First appearance: Resident Evil 2 (1998)
- Created by: Hideki Kamiya; Noboru Sugimura
- Designed by: Isao Ohishi; Ryoji Shimogama
- Portrayed by: Various: Adrienne Frantz (Resident Evil 2 commercial) Jordan McEwen (Resident Evil 2 remake, Resident Evil Veronica) Ali Larter (Extinction, Afterlife, The Final Chapter) Kaya Scodelario (Welcome to Raccoon City)
- Voiced by: English: Alyson Court (Resident Evil 2, Code: Veronica, Degeneration, Operation Raccoon City) James Baker (Pseudonym) (Revelations 2) Stephanie Panisello (Resident Evil 2 remake, Infinite Darkness, Death Island, Goddess of Victory: Nikke) Danielle Evans (Dead by Daylight); Japanese: Yūko Kaida (Revelations 2, Resident Evil 2 remake, Goddess of Victory: Nikke); Fairouz Ai (Welcome to Raccoon City)
- Motion capture: Various: Ananda Jacobs (Revelations 2) Stephanie Panisello (Resident Evil 2 remake, Infinite Darkness, Death Island)

In-universe information
- Family: Chris Redfield (brother)
- Nationality: American

Claire Redfield (Note: Japanese: クレア・レッドフィールド, Hepburn: Kurea Reddofīrudo) is a character in Resident Evil (Biohazard in Japan), a survival horror series created by the Japanese company Capcom. Claire was first introduced alongside Leon S. Kennedy as one of two player characters in Resident Evil 2 (1998). The character was conceived as Elza Walker, a blonde motorcyclist character in the prototype of the game, but her name and role were changed for the final version to connect its story to that of Resident Evil (1996). In Resident Evil 2, Claire arrives in Raccoon City, a town in the Midwestern United States that has been overrun by zombies, to find her missing brother Chris Redfield.

Claire is the protagonist of several Resident Evil games, novels, and films, and has appeared in other franchises, including Monster Hunter and Teppen. Several actors have portrayed Claire; in Resident Evil 2 (1998), she is voiced by Alyson Court, whose features were later used for the character. In the 2019 remake of Resident Evil 2, she is voiced by Stephanie Panisello and modeled on the Canadian model Jordan McEwen. In the live-action Resident Evil films, Claire has been portrayed by Ali Larter and Kaya Scodelario.

Critics have positively responded to Claire's personality and her role as a strong, female lead character. Several journalists considered Claire to be significantly less sexualized than other female game characters. She was exemplified as a female character who is as competent and skilled as her male counterparts.

== Concept and design ==
Claire Redfield was introduced alongside the police officer Leon S. Kennedy as one of two playable protagonists in Capcom's 1998 survival horror video game Resident Evil 2. Claire was developed from an earlier character named Elza Walker, the original female lead of the game's first prototype, who was a blonde motorcyclist who crashed her bike into Raccoon Police Station, where she fled for safety. In the middle of the game's development, newly-hired storywriter Noboru Sugimura felt the story needed a stronger connection to Resident Evil (1996). Director Hideki Kamiya and producer Shinji Mikami agreed with Sugimura's criticism, and Sugimura substantially overhauled the story, including reworking Elza into Claire Redfield, the sister of Chris Redfield.

Claire's appearance was designed by the artists Isao Ohishi and Ryoji Shimogama. To avoid sexual objectification of women in video games, Mikami refused to eroticize or portray women in Resident Evil as submissive; instead, Claire was characterized as independent. Mikami said: "I don't know if I've put more emphasis on women characters, but when I do introduce them, it is never as objects ... In [other] games, they will be peripheral characters with ridiculous breast physics. I avoid that sort of obvious eroticism." In the 2019 remake of Resident Evil 2, Claire was redesigned and modeled after the Canadian model Jordan McEwen. She was given a new wardrobe, and her original hotpants and cycling shorts were replaced with jeans and a long-sleeved jacket.

Claire continued to be redesigned during the series. She was given a tougher appearance in Resident Evil – Code: Veronica (2000) because her experiences in Resident Evil 2 toughened her and increased her confidence to handle situations. This characterization is emphasized in the opening scene, in which she appears in a John Woo-inspired action scene. During Q&A for the remake, Resident Evil Veronica (2027), producer Yoshiaki Hirabayashi was asked whether Claire will also have a new parry mechanic like Leon had in Resident Evil Requiem (2026), but he stated that Veronica takes place only a few months after Resident Evil 2, which Claire has not enough time to train and dramatically expand her arsenal of lethal moves.

For Resident Evil: Revelations 2 (2015), Claire was written as practical and aggressive to contrast with her partner, the young, immature, and easily scared Moira Burton. According to the producer Michiteru Okabe, they had not reduced the two characters to their gender and had instead given them unique personalities, which he said reflected positively on the video-game industry's direction at the time. According to Okabe, the director Morimasa Sato is a big fan of Claire so Okabe felt obliged to bring her back into the game.

=== Voice-over and live-action actors ===
Alyson Court voiced Claire Redfield in Resident Evil 2 (1998) and reprised the role in Resident Evil – Code: Veronica, Resident Evil: Degeneration, and Resident Evil: Operation Raccoon City. In Resident Evil: Revelations 2, Claire was voiced by James Baker (Pseudonym), while Ananda Jacobs performed motion capture for the character. Stephanie Panisello performed motion capture and voiced Claire in Resident Evil 2 (2019), Resident Evil: Infinite Darkness, and Resident Evil: Death Island.

Claire is played by Adrienne Frantz in a commercial for Resident Evil 2 (1998) that was directed by George A. Romero. In the live-action Resident Evil film series, Ali Larter played Claire in Resident Evil: Extinction, Resident Evil: Afterlife, and Resident Evil: The Final Chapter; and Kaya Scodelario portrayed her in Resident Evil: Welcome to Raccoon City.

== Appearances ==
=== In the Resident Evil series ===
Resident Evil games featuring Claire Redfield
1998	Resident Evil 2
1999
2000	Resident Evil – Code: Veronica
2001	Resident Evil Survivor 2 – Code: Veronica
2002–2008
2009	Resident Evil: The Darkside Chronicles
2010
2011	Resident Evil: The Mercenaries 3D
2012	Resident Evil: Operation Raccoon City
2013–2014
2015	Resident Evil: Revelations 2
2016–2018
2019	Resident Evil 2 (remake)
2020–2021
2022	Resident Evil Re:Verse
2023–2026
2027	Resident Evil Veronica (remake)

The events of Resident Evil 2 occur in 1998 in the fictional American metropolis Raccoon City. Claire is a college student who is searching for her brother Chris Redfield, a member of the Special Tactics And Rescue Service (S.T.A.R.S.) team. Claire arrives in Raccoon City to find it overrun by zombies, for which the pharmaceutical company Umbrella Corporation is responsible. Claire meets with the police officer Leon S. Kennedy but is later separated from him. In the Raccoon Police Department building, Claire encounters Sherry Birkin, a young woman who is being pursued by her father, the mutated scientist William Birkin. After defeating William Birkin, Claire arrives at NEST, an Umbrella underground facility, and finds a vaccine to cure Sherry, who has become infected with the G-virus. Claire gives Sherry's scientist mother Annette Birkin the vaccine so she can cure Sherry but Annette dies from her injuries, which William inflicted. Claire escapes from the facility on a train, along with Leon and Sherry, before Raccoon City is destroyed by a nuclear strike as part of a U.S. government cover-up.

Mikami, the lead producer of both Resident Evil 3: Nemesis (1999) and the concurrently-produced Code: Veronica, wanted each game to highlight an existing female character in the series. Jill is the protagonist of Nemesis while Claire is the lead character in Code: Veronica. Commentators said these decisions were made as a result of the success of the Tomb Raider series, whose protagonist is Lara Croft. Code: Veronica is set three months after Claire's escape from Raccoon City; she is apprehended while trying to find Chris and raiding a European Umbrella facility. She is sent to an island prison under the command of Alfred Ashford, a descendant of one of the Umbrella Corporation's founders. There is an outbreak; Claire sets out to find Chris, runs into fellow prisoner Steve Burnside, and plans to leave the island as soon as she is released. After discovering Chris is not on the island, Claire escapes on a plane. Ashford remotely controls the aircraft and crashes it into an Umbrella facility in Antarctica. Chris defeats the main antagonist Alexia Ashford and escapes with Claire before the Antarctic facility self-destructs. After that, they vow to put an end to the Umbrella Corporation. In the PlayStation 2 and GameCube versions, Veronica X, Claire also briefly encounters the series' main villain Albert Wesker.

In Resident Evil: Revelations 2 (2015), Claire is a member of the counter-bioterrorism group TerraSave. The game follows Claire and Barry Burton's daughter Moira as they are kidnapped, infected with the T-Phobos virus, and trapped on a mysterious, abandoned, prison island. They defeat Alex Wesker and some monsters. Claire and Moira, and Barry arrives to look for them and a young girl named Natalia Korda.

=== Other appearances ===
Claire features in several of the Resident Evil films that were directed by Paul W. S. Anderson. In Resident Evil: Extinction (2007), Claire is the leader of a convoy of zombie-apocalypse survivors who, at the end of the film, go to Alaska to find safety. She also appears in Resident Evil: Afterlife (2010) but does not appear in its sequel Resident Evil: Retribution (2012), in which she is presumed dead. Claire returns in the sixth-and-final film of the original film series Resident Evil: The Final Chapter (2016), in which she teams up with Alice before an artificial intelligence called Red Queen attempts to destroy humanity. She also appears in the reboot film Resident Evil: Welcome to Raccoon City (2021).

Claire also appears in the animated Resident Evil films. She plays a major role in Resident Evil: Degeneration (2008), in which she is reunited with Leon. The film is set seven years after the events of the game Resident Evil 2, and Claire has become a prominent TerraSave member. Claire has also appeared with Leon in the Netflix series Resident Evil: Infinite Darkness (2021), in which TerraSave staff member encounters a mysterious image a young boy draws in a country she visited while providing refugee assistance. She is haunted by this drawing of a victim of viral infection and begins her own investigation. She returns in the sequel Resident Evil: Death Island (2023). Claire's youthful appearance in the film is said to be a result of the T-Phobos virus slowing her aging.

Claire is a playable character in several non-canonical Resident Evil games. She features in numerous Resident Evil mobile games, and is the protagonist of Resident Evil: Zombie Busters (2001) and Resident Evil Uprising (2009). She is a playable character in the digital collectible card game Teppen (2019), and in a mobile game Puzzle & Survival (2023). Claire is an alternate skin in the asymmetric online multiplayer game Dead by Daylight (2016), in Fortnite Battle Royale (2017), PUBG Mobile (2018), and the action role-playing game Monster Hunter: World (2018). She has a non-playable cameo in the sports game Trick'N Snowboarder (1999), the browser-based hack and slash game Onimusha Soul (2013), and a robot dressed as Claire in the Astro Bot (2024).

Claire appears in novelizations of the films and games, and plays a main role in the third novel in a series by S. D. Perry, Resident Evil: City of the Dead (1999). Several comic books based on the games were released. She is one of the main characters in Naoki Serizawa's manga Biohazard: Heavenly Island, which was serialized in Weekly Shōnen Champion magazine in 2015; in this manga, Claire is a TerraSave investigator on an isolated South American island. She features in Bandai's Resident Evil Deck Building Card Game (2011) and Steamforged Games' Resident Evil 2: The Board Game (2017). The character was featured in a Resident Evil-themed attraction at Universal Studios Japan's ride Halloween Horror Nights. Claire's likeness has been used for merchandise including figurines, plushies, keychains, vests, and standees.

== Critical reception ==
Claire Redfield has received positive reviews from critics for her personality and characteristics. GamesRadar+ described her as one of Capcom's best characters. IGN editors and Kimberly Wallace of Game Informer praised Claire; Wallace stating Claire is her favorite Resident Evil character, "caring, strong-willed, and a total badass". Critic Scott Rogers, writing for Level Up!: The Guide to Great Video Game Design described Claire as a perfect example of the theme "opposites attract" in Resident Evil 2 as a companion character who is capable of anything, while Sherry is a "defenseless little girl". Other critics praised Claire's role as a strong female lead character; Syfy's Brittany Vincent described her as a "strong-willed young woman who's tough as nails and ready to take on any challenge". According to Matt Cabral of IGN, Claire was more popular than her brother, but never got the most important roles in the franchise. He stated that she felt that she deserved more but fully expected that the remake of Code Veronica to add more layers to a character that has already seen major changes.

Critics have commented Claire is not oversexualized in her initial appearances, and she has been exemplified as a female character from the series who is not exclusively evaluated on the basis of her gender. The Digital media academic Esther MacCallum-Stewart said Resident Evil's female characters have unique qualities, making them viable choices for players to select over their male counterparts, and that their combat attire helps avoid criticism for pandering to the male gaze. The feminist media critic Anita Sarkeesian of Tropes vs. Women in Video Games criticized the Resident Evil series' trend of rewarding male players with unlockable outfits that reduce the oft-capable women into sexual objects, citing Claire's rodeo outfit in Revelations 2 being an example. The academic writer Jenny Platz said women in video games are generally not shown with any gender fluidity, and that Claire is reduced to a "sexless object" who is comparable with the "typical trope" of "a virgin or tomboy".
