= Carrier (video game) =

2000 video game

- North American Dreamcast cover art
- Developer: Jaleco
- Publisher: Jaleco: EU: Xicat Interactive
- Designer: Tomoko Onodera
- Programmer: Akihiro Yoshida
- Artist: Masato Arakawa
- Writers: Hideki Kakinuma; Hiroaki Murakami
- Composers: Teruyuki Mori; Shinichiro Nakamura; Toru Ohara
- Platform: Dreamcast
- Release: JP: February 24, 2000; NA: February 29, 2000; EU: July 5, 2001
- Genre: Survival horror
- Mode: Single-player

Carrier (キャリアー, Kyariā) is a survival horror video game for the Dreamcast, notable in part for being fully 3D - then still a rarity for survival horror games, which mostly displayed 3D characters over pre-rendered backgrounds. In Carrier, players assume the separate roles of an investigation team that was split up from a surprise attack.

A cancelled sequel for the PlayStation 2 titled Carrier: The Next Mutation was once planned for release in February 2001.

== Gameplay ==
Despite the basic attributes of the game's controls, there were additional features to make the gameplay more unique.

- Aiming: Though players aim whilst their character stands in place, players have the ability to focus their fire on targeted areas of their enemies bodies. Once the player aims at an enemy, a circle of tiny blue triangles indicate vital areas on an enemy that can be amputated, such as arms, heads and, sometimes, even torsos.
- Explosives: During the course of the game, players are faced with certain doors or blocked areas that cannot be accessed unless timed explosives are first obtained. These explosives, once set on the ground, detonate after five seconds, giving the player some time to evacuate before detonation. The blast radius of these explosives is relatively small, but still deadly, so it is necessary for the player to run away from the bomb before it explodes. Despite being mainly used as a tool, the explosives can also be used as weapons for slow enemies that work in groups. However, because these bombs cannot be thrown and only one can be set at a time, the player must strategize before using them as a weapon.
- BEM-T3 Scope: Early on in the game, players receive an infrared scope used for biohazardous warfare to determine if certain individuals are infected with particular infections. During gameplay, this device helps players determine if certain non-player characters (NPCs) are infected with the mutagenic strain spread around the ship. On-screen indicators help in determining if crew members are uninfected with a large SAFE symbol, while others display a DANGER symbol on the Scope's internal visor. Various specific sounds will also indicate if a crew member/character is affected by this condition. Because it was created for warfare, the BEM-T3 can also determine whether certain caches or compartments contain items, weapons or ammunition. Although the scope does not designate which item is actually a weapon or ammunition clip, the item indication will show up on the sensor, accompanied with a series of light sounds. Players also have the option of zooming in on their surroundings while using the scope and it is also handy for looking down dark corridors and determining enemy distance.

The game features two playable characters, Jack Ingles and Jessifer Manning, with Ingles being played from the start and Manning in the later part of the story.

== Premise ==
The background to Carrier involves some reading into as the current events in the game are influenced by past organizations that are pivotal to the storyline. Following the year 2008, the world faced an economical decline as natural resources and agriculture had reached a new low. A massive political divide ensued as the leaders of advanced nations decided to restrict the transportation of aid and agricultural items to their respective countries: those on the Southern Hemisphere and those on the Northern Hemisphere.

Naturally this caused a massive decrease in trade and employment for both sides that sparked great economic and moral criticism from the G77, a political organization formed by seventy-seven different southern countries.

As conditions worsened for the southern countries, terrorist activity arose from the south, so much that the terrorist leaders formed a large group known as the Southern Cross. Southern Cross activity in Colombia caught the concern of the US military, so much that the US took a militaristic stand against terrorist activity and started the US-G77 Crisis, though the G77 claimed to have been uninvolved in the Southern Cross activities. Despite this, the leaders of the northern countries organized an international enforcement known as the NTA (Northern Treaty Alliance) to assist the north's military strength against terrorist activity. The US military added to this by constructing larger bases and vehicles against the Southern Cross, including a base in Mozambique and an enormous and technologically advanced aircraft carrier named Heimdal.

With the Heimdal as the US Navy's largest nuclear-powered aircraft carrier ever constructed and capable of launching a barrage of ballistic missiles, the carrier soon demonstrated its power on a mission called Operation Hurricane. Three Special Forces divisions were placed on the Heimdal to carry out an attack on a Southern Cross base as well as to pick up an ancient organism said to have been located somewhere in the South Pacific. The next day after the transportation of the organism, sabotage struck the engine room, though the Heimdal could still make its course back to American shores. Two days afterward, the Heimdal exhibited a period of radio silence, yet the ship was still heading for shore through the Pacific.

It's here that an NTA investigation team known as SPARC is sent to enter the Heimdal and discover what caused the radio silence. The first team that was originally sent in landed and entered the ship safely, but were quickly silenced; a second team was sent in afterwards. When the team's helicopter starts to land on the Heimdal, the Heimdal's guns automatically lock-on to the chopper and shoot it down, separating the team aboard the Heimdal. It's from here that mutants attack the main characters in their search for the truth.

== Reception ==
Reception

Aggregate score
Aggregator	Score
GameRankings	70%

Review scores
Publication	Score
AllGame	3/5
CNET Gamecenter	6/10
Electronic Gaming Monthly	5.625/10 (Note: Two critics of Electronic Gaming Monthly gave the game each a score of 6.5/10, one gave it 5.5/10, and the other gave it 4/10.)
EP Daily	6/10
Famitsu	28/40
Game Informer	6.75/10
GameFan	(J.W.) 92% 83% (Note: In GameFan's viewpoint of the game, three critics gave it each a score of 80, 86, and 84.)
GameRevolution	B−
GameSpot	6.3/10
GameSpy	7.5/10
IGN	8/10
Next Generation	3/5

The game received average reviews according to the review aggregation website GameRankings.

Jon Thompson of AllGame noted that "there are plenty of aspects to Carrier for die-hard survival horror fans to appreciate, but ultimately, the title suffers from a number of problems and quirks that keep it from being anything more than average." Thompson noted that the large environments lead to a tedious amount of backtracking and that "when there are a lot of objects on the screen, the game slows to a crawl. This makes boss battles particularly obnoxious, since most bosses are fairly huge, and when you are with them, the game sputters along as if it were in slow motion." Jeff Lundrigan of NextGen said that the game was "Well made and reasonably entertaining, but nothing you haven't seen before." In Japan, Famitsu gave it a score of 28 out of 40.

Tokyo Drifter of GamePro said in one review, "Carrier may not win any awards for most original gameplay, but gamers who have played through Code Veronica, or who are just looking for a change, should definitely check it out." (Note: GamePro gave the game two 4/5 scores for graphics and sound, and two 3.5/5 scores for control and fun factor in one review.) In another GamePro review, however, Jake The Snake said, "If you loved RE on the PlayStation and can't wait to play a similar—but not nearly as good—game on your Dreamcast, you might enjoy Carrier. Otherwise, wait for the real thing—Resident Evil – Code: Veronica." (Note: GamePro gave the game 3.5/5 for graphics, and three 3/5 scores for sound, control, and fun factor in another review.)
