= Resident Evil Veronica =

Upcoming video game

- Promotional key art featuring Claire Redfield
- Developer: Capcom
- Publisher: Capcom
- Directors: Yasuhiro Anpo; Kazunori Kadoi
- Producer: Yoshiaki Hirabayashi
- Series: Resident Evil
- Engine: RE Engine
- Platforms: Nintendo Switch 2; PlayStation 5; Windows; Xbox Series X/S
- Release: 2027
- Genre: Survival horror
- Mode: Single-player

Resident Evil Veronica (Note: Known in Japan as Biohazard RE:Veronica (Japanese: バイオハザード RE:ベロニカ, Hepburn: Baiohazādo Āru Ī Beronika)) is an upcoming survival horror game developed and published by Capcom. It is a remake of the 2000 video game Resident Evil – Code: Veronica and part of the Resident Evil series. The game is scheduled for release in 2027 for Nintendo Switch 2, PlayStation 5, Windows, and Xbox Series X and Series S.

Veronica follows siblings Claire Redfield and Chris Redfield three months after the events of the Raccoon City incident. Searching for her brother in Paris, Claire is captured by the Umbrella Corporation and imprisoned on Rockfort Island, a remote prison facility that experiences a T-virus outbreak.

== Premise ==
Resident Evil Veronica is a survival horror game from a third-person perspective, similar to the Resident Evil 2 remake. It follows Claire Redfield during an escape from the isolated, zombie-filled Rockfort Island. The first trailer showed Claire in Paris while searching for her brother, Chris Redfield. Capcom said the remake would preserve the essence of Code: Veronica with modernised gameplay, a reimagined storyline and updated graphics.

== Development and release ==
Resident Evil – Code: Veronica was originally released for the Dreamcast in 2000. The remake follows Capcom's remakes of earlier Resident Evil games, including Resident Evil 2, Resident Evil 3, and Resident Evil 4. Developed using Capcom's proprietary RE Engine, Veronica was unveiled at Summer Game Fest on June 5, 2026, where the series' executive producer Jun Takeuchi presented the announcement alongside host Geoff Keighley. The announcement trailer opened the event and revealed the title. It is scheduled for release in 2027 for Nintendo Switch 2, PlayStation 5, Windows, and Xbox Series X/S.
