= Sherry Birkin =

Resident Evil character

- Resident Evil character
- Sherry Birkin in Resident Evil 6 (2012)
- First appearance: Resident Evil 2 (1998)
- Portrayed by: Holly de Barros (Welcome to Raccoon City)
- Voiced by: English; Lisa Yamanaka (Resident Evil 2); Laura Bailey (The Darkside Chronicles); Eden Riegel (Operation Raccoon City, Resident Evil 6, Resident Evil Requiem); Eliza Pryor (Resident Evil 2 remake); Japanese; Hisako Kanemoto (Operation Raccoon City); Maaya Sakamoto (Resident Evil 6, Resident Evil Requiem); Rio Sasaki (Resident Evil 2 remake)
- Motion capture: Sara Fletcher (Resident Evil 6); Eliza Pryor (Resident Evil 2 remake); Eden Riegel (Resident Evil Requiem)

In-universe information
- Occupation: United States government agent
- Family: William Birkin (father); Annette Birkin (mother)

Sherry Birkin (Japanese: シェリー・バーキン, Hepburn: Shirī Bākin) is a character in Capcom's Resident Evil survival horror series. She was introduced as a child in the 1998 video game Resident Evil 2, in which she is the daughter of Umbrella researchers William and Annette Birkin. She encounters Leon S. Kennedy and Claire Redfield who protect her while trying to escape the city. Sherry is a playable character in some parts of the game but she is completely unarmed and can only avoid monsters. Sherry later returned as an adult and playable protagonist in Resident Evil 6, where she works as an agent of the United States government, and appears in a supporting capacity in Resident Evil Requiem. She has also appeared in adaptations and other media based on the series.

Sherry's portrayal has changed substantially across her appearances, from an unarmed and vulnerable child companion to a combat-capable adult operative. Her characterization and visual design were revised for the 2019 remake of Resident Evil 2, whose developers sought a more realistic depiction of a twelve-year-old and expanded her individual characterization. Critical and academic discussion of Sherry has examined her use as an artificial-intelligence companion, her relationships with Claire and her parents, and the series' treatment of gender, vulnerability and player agency. Her later appearances have prompted further commentary on the extent of her narrative independence as an adult character and, following Requiem, on the representation and reduced prominence of older women within the Resident Evil series.

== Concept and development ==
Sherry originated during the development of an abandoned version of Resident Evil 2, subsequently known as Resident Evil 1.5. That version starred Leon S. Kennedy alongside a different female protagonist, Elza Walker. According to a retrospective by Leon Hurley of GamesRadar+, Sherry was among Elza's supporting characters and, together with William Birkin and police chief Brian Irons, survived the extensive redevelopment that transformed Resident Evil 1.5 into the released game. Sherry's relationship with the mutated William and the basic purpose she served in the story were retained, although her yellow clothing in early versions was replaced by the blue-and-white outfit used in Resident Evil 2.

Concept art of Sherry Birkin for the 2019 remake of Resident Evil 2, with the character's render from the original 1998 video game used as a reference point.

For Resident Evil 2, Sherry was written as twelve years old. When Capcom revisited the character for the 2019 remake of Resident Evil 2, director Kazunori Kadoi said the team deliberately made her look closer to her stated age. Her clothing was redesigned to resemble that of a schoolgirl in the late 1990s, while some facial features were informed by Sherry's adult appearance in Resident Evil 6. Kadoi noted that the original design was both unusually young-looking and influenced by anime, whereas the remake sought a more realistic and age-appropriate appearance. The developers decided to move away from presenting her merely as the symbolic idea of a child and instead depict her as an individual with a recognizable personality. In an interview with Eurogamer, Kadoi noted that Newt from the film Aliens was a reference point for the revised Sherry, particularly the sense that the child had already endured traumatic experiences before meeting the protagonist. Kadoi said the remake's more photorealistic presentation also required Sherry to have greater psychological depth and motivations of her own rather than function simply as a child character. Co-director Yasuhiro Anpo said the remake also made Brian Irons more threatening in order to communicate the danger Sherry faced during her sections of the game.

Sherry was reintroduced as an adult for Resident Evil 6. Executive producer Hiroyuki Kobayashi said one reason for bringing her back was the opportunity to show how the child introduced in Resident Evil 2 had developed. Director Eiichiro Sasaki said she was paired with the new character Jake Muller because both had been forced to live differently from other people as a consequence of their biological inheritance, providing a basis for a relationship unlike the game's other partnerships. Promotional material identified the adult Sherry as a United States government agent sent to find and protect Jake.

In English, Sherry was originally voiced by Lisa Yamanaka in Resident Evil 2, with Laura Bailey assuming the role for The Darkside Chronicles. Eden Riegel voiced Sherry in Operation Raccoon City and returned for Resident Evil 6, in which Sara Fletcher provided her performance capture. For the 2019 remake of Resident Evil 2, Eliza Pryor supplied both Sherry's English voice and motion capture, while Rio Sasaki performed the Japanese-language version. Riegel later returned as Sherry's English voice and performance-capture actor in Resident Evil Requiem, opposite Maaya Sakamoto in the Japanese version.

== Appearances ==
Sherry first appears in Resident Evil 2 as the daughter of Umbrella Corporation researchers William and Annette Birkin. During the outbreak in Raccoon City she meets Claire Redfield, who assumes responsibility for protecting her from harm. Her relationship with William becomes central to the latter part of Claire's story, while her parents' absorption in their work is used to establish Sherry as an isolated child who becomes emotionally dependent upon Claire. Sherry is briefly playable during Claire's scenario; unlike the game's principal characters, she is unarmed and must avoid enemies rather than fight them. Her father has been transformed into a monstrous creature by the G-virus and infects her, but Claire gives Sherry an anti-virus, which prevents her from mutating. Sherry assists Leon and Claire in boarding a secret underground train, and successfully escapes Raccoon City before it is destroyed.

Sherry also appears in Resident Evil: The Darkside Chronicles in chapters that recapitulate the events of Resident Evil 2. The 2019 remake broadly retains Sherry's role as a child companion to Claire, while substantially rewriting the circumstances surrounding Sherry and Claire's relationship. Sherry receives an expanded playable sequence in which she is separated from Claire, abducted by police chief Brian Irons, and has no conventional means of attacking her pursuer. The remake also gives greater narrative prominence to her interactions with Irons, and to her strained relationship with her parents.

In Resident Evil 6, set several years after Resident Evil 2, Sherry works for the United States government and is assigned to locate mercenary Jake Muller because of his potential importance in combating a new viral outbreak. Unlike her appearance in Resident Evil 2, Sherry is a combat-capable playable character. Her childhood exposure to the G-virus is stated to have left her with immunity to infection and unusually rapid healing abilities, allowing her to recover from injuries beyond those of an ordinary human. Her campaign pairs her with Jake as they attempt to reach United States authorities while being pursued by bioterrorist forces. During the course of the game, she helps Jake deal with the fact that Albert Wesker is his father. She also learns from Leon that her superior, Derek C. Simmons, is the man responsible for the U.S. President's death. She and Jake subsequently ally with Leon, Chris Redfield and their partners in thwarting Carla Radames' plans.

Sherry later returns in Resident Evil Requiem, set fourteen years after Resident Evil 6. At forty years old, she works principally as a radio and technical support operative for Leon, providing logistical assistance and accessing computer systems on his behalf. As with all survivors of the Raccoon City Incident, she is also infected with a mutated T-virus strain known as Raccoon City Syndrome, though her symptoms progressed comparatively slower to Leon's infection.

Sherry also appears in adaptations and other Resident Evil media. 2009's Resident Evil: The Darkside Chronicles retells the events of Resident Evil 2. In the 2021 live-action reboot film Resident Evil: Welcome to Raccoon City, she is portrayed by Holly de Barros, in her first feature film role.

== Reception and analysis ==
=== Child companion ===
Writing for the Singapore-MIT GAMBIT Game Lab in 2009, Matthew Weise praised Sherry as one of the stronger elements of the original Resident Evil 2, particularly Lisa Yamanaka's naturalistic child performance and the interaction between Sherry's characterization and artificial intelligence. When following Claire, Sherry moves more slowly and may stop if left behind, requiring the player to return for her. Weise compared this simple mechanic with the companion design of Yorda in Ico, arguing that it suggested the behaviour of a neglected child and made retrieving Sherry feel like reassurance rather than merely a gameplay requirement.

Weise further argued that Sherry and Claire formed a convincing protector-and-companion relationship because Sherry's dependence was credible for a child, avoiding the contrivances he associated with games that render adult women dependent on male protagonists. He compared their relationship with Ripley and Newt in Aliens, and later interpreted Claire's protection of Sherry from William Birkin within the broader gender politics of Resident Evil 2. Although Claire's maternal role drew on conventional characterization, Weise considered the relationship an effective source of horror and drama rather than a means of diminishing the female protagonist.

Media scholar Christopher Alexander Alton subsequently examined Sherry at length in his 2020 doctoral dissertation on gender in the Resident Evil series. Alton interpreted William as both Sherry's literal father and a representation of the patriarchal order that Resident Evil 2 renders monstrous. In his reading, William's failure to take responsibility for his family or for the consequences of his research is contrasted with Claire's willingness to protect Sherry. Alton consequently interpreted Claire's efforts to save her as part of the game's broader rejection of the violent masculine order represented by William. Alton also noted the contrast between contemporary criticism of Sherry's vulnerable playable sequence and the relative lack of discussion of the darker familial implications surrounding her. Period reviews and strategy guides commented on the danger posed to an unarmed Sherry during gameplay, but according to Alton largely ignored the relationship between her vulnerability and William's attempts to reproduce through her. He used this disparity as part of his argument that the game's horror is closely connected to gendered family relationships rather than simply physical danger.

Carl Wilson included Sherry in his discussion of the "Final Girl" and female survivorship in video games in the 2024 Routledge collection Heroic Girls as Figures of Resistance and Futurity in Popular Culture. Discussing the remake of Resident Evil 2, Wilson contrasted its principal heroines with Sherry's sections, in which the unarmed child is made especially vulnerable to both monsters and threatening adult men. He regarded her temporary playability as a different form of female perspective within a game otherwise built around more capable adult survivors.

=== Adulthood and agency ===
Tim Turi of Game Informer described Sherry's adult incarnation in Resident Evil 6 to be likable and empathetic and welcomed the parallel between her and Jake, whose lives had both been shaped by their fathers' involvement with biological weapons. Andrew Fitch of Electronic Gaming Monthly similarly welcomed her return and praised the chemistry between Sherry and Jake.

Alton was more critical of how Sherry's newfound competence would translate into narrative authority. While Resident Evil 6 allows the player to control Sherry, Alton argued that the game continues to frame Jake as its default protagonist for the campaign: the important decisions remain Jake's and Sherry principally follows his direction. He compared this with the treatment of Helena Harper in Leon's campaign, arguing that the presence of playable women did not necessarily make the stories theirs. Alton also criticized the sexualization of the adult Sherry. He highlighted both a sequence in which she wears an undersized hospital gown and an unlockable version of her childhood school uniform, arguing that the latter was designed around the body of the now-adult character rather than simply reproducing the original outfit. For Alton, such choices complicated the apparent progression from Sherry's childhood vulnerability to her new status as an armed government operative. Paulina Rajkowska similarly identified a tension between Sherry's outward competence and her narrative dependence in Resident Evil 6. Although describing her as a trained government agent proficient with firearms and knives, Rajkowska argued that Sherry frequently second-guesses herself, defers important decisions to Jake and requires his assistance despite the abilities attributed to her.

Harper Jay MacIntyre of Mothership criticized Sherry's reduced role in Resident Evil Requiem, contrasting her largely off-screen work providing radio, technical and logistical support to Leon with her earlier status as a playable field agent in Resident Evil 6. Although Sherry remains important to Leon's mission, MacIntyre regarded her as comparatively sidelined. MacIntyre placed this change within a broader criticism of the series' treatment of aging women. Sherry is forty in Requiem, while several other established female characters are in their late forties or early fifties; MacIntyre compared their reduced prominence with age discrimination against actresses in film and contrasted Sherry's supporting role with that of the younger playable protagonist Grace Ashcroft. Whereas Christopher Alton had argued that Resident Evil 6 gave Sherry physical capability without equivalent narrative authority, MacIntyre considered Requiem to have reduced both her participation and narrative prominence.
