= Resident Evil: The Darkside Chronicles =

2009 video game

- Developers: Capcom; Cavia
- Publisher: Capcom
- Directors: Yasuhiro Seto; Hiroaki Kotake; Isao Takahashi
- Producers: Masachika Kawata; Kentaro Noguchi
- Writers: Shotaro Suga; Yasuhiro Seto; Haruo Murata
- Composers: Shusaku Uchiyama; Takeshi Miura
- Series: Resident Evil
- Engine: MT Framework
- Platforms: Wii, PlayStation 3
- Release: November 17, 2009: Wii; NA: November 17, 2009; AU: November 26, 2009; EU: November 27, 2009; JP: January 14, 2010 PlayStation 3; NA: June 26, 2012 (PSN); EU: June 27, 2012 (PSN); JP: June 28, 2012
- Genres: Rail shooter, light gun shooter
- Modes: Single-player, multiplayer

Resident Evil: The Darkside Chronicles (Note: Known in Japan as Biohazard: The Darkside Chronicles (Japanese: バイオハザード ダークサイド・クロニクルズ, Hepburn: Baiohazādo Dākusaido Kuronikuruzu)) is an on-rails light gun shooter video game for the Wii developed by Capcom and Cavia as part of the Resident Evil series. The game was released for the Wii on November 17, 2009, in North America. It serves as a prequel to Resident Evil 4, set 2 years before its events. It was released in Europe on November 27, 2009, bundled with the Wii Zapper accessory.

In the game, players follow the stories of two characters, Leon S. Kennedy and Jack Krauser, as they try to uncover the mysteries behind the T-virus, a deadly virus developed by the Umbrella Corporation. The game is played from a first-person perspective and involves shooting enemies and solving puzzles. It also includes a co-op mode in which two players can play together.

Resident Evil: The Darkside Chronicles received generally positive reviews upon release.

The game, along with The Umbrella Chronicles, is included in the Resident Evil Chronicles HD Collection for the PlayStation 3.

== Plot ==
The game's plot revolves around the personal stories in the series. Its main focus is retelling the events of Resident Evil 2 and Resident Evil – Code: Veronica, and a new chapter is featured. For the Resident Evil 2 segment, the player takes control of protagonists Leon S. Kennedy and Claire Redfield, with Sherry Birkin acting as an escort character in one chapter. The Code: Veronica chapter features Claire, accompanied by fellow Rockfort Island prisoner Steve Burnside and later her brother Chris Redfield.

=== Scenarios ===
==== Operation Javier ====
The main scenario in Resident Evil: The Darkside Chronicles focuses on Leon Kennedy, during his first mission as an agent of the United States Special Operations Command, four years after the events of Resident Evil 2. Jack Krauser, a seasoned American Special Forces operative, accompanies Kennedy into a South American village to search for Javier Hidalgo, a former drug lord with ties to the Umbrella Corporation. They quickly discover the village has suffered a viral outbreak and is overrun with zombies and mutant bio-organic weapons (BOWs). The duo fights past the creatures and finds Javier's daughter, Manuela, who agrees to guide them through the jungle.

Manuela reveals her father treated her with the T-Veronica virus to cure a terminal illness. The group arrives at Javier's mansion and battle waves of Javier's experimental BOWs. They encounter Hilda, Manuela's mother, who transforms into a ravenous monster after succumbing to the T-Veronica virus. Kennedy dispatches Hilda, but Krauser severely injures his arm during the battle. Javier attempts to overpower Kennedy and Krauser by merging with a massive BOW called V-Complex. Manuela, in turn, uses the powers of the T-Veronica virus to aid Kennedy and Krauser in defeating Javier. The three escape the compound with a helicopter.

==== Memories of a Lost City ====
This scenario re-tells the events of Resident Evil 2, leading up to when Leon and Claire destroy 'G' (a mutated William Birkin). Leon S. Kennedy and Claire Redfield have just arrived in Raccoon City when they learn that the city has been infested with zombies and other monsters. They decide to go to the police station, hoping to find answers, and discover Umbrella's involvement in the ordeal. Birkin's own daughter, Sherry, becomes his target and Leon and Claire must protect her from becoming mutated by his G-virus, all the while stalked by the powerful Tyrant and dealing with the mysterious agenda of Ada Wong.

==== Game of Oblivion ====
An abridged re-telling of Resident Evil – Code: Veronica, where Claire Redfield and Steve Burnside remain together and attempt to escape Rockfort Island in a seaplane, while having to contend with the psychotic Alfred Ashford, and eventually, his sister Alexia. Claire and Steve are eventually separated and Chris arrives to help her find him, before taking on Alexia. In this iteration of the story, their father Alexander Ashford makes his first appearance, in a video, prior to becoming the monster known as Nosferatu.

==== Darkness Falls ====
"Darkness Falls" is a hidden scenario in the game that focuses on Jack Krauser during Operation Javier. Krauser narrates his thoughts as he helps Leon Kennedy battle their way through Javier's headquarters. After a fierce battle with a BOW, Krauser severely injures his arm and is forced to rely on Kennedy's assistance for survival. They ultimately defeat Javier, but Krauser is deemed physically incapable of continuing his military service. He becomes infatuated with the idea that Umbrella's mutagenic viruses can grant unlimited power and leaves the U.S. government to seek out Albert Wesker.

== Gameplay ==
Gameplay screenshot

The Darkside Chronicles is a rail shooter. Players use the Wii Remote to target and eliminate enemies in the style of a light gun shooter game. One can either play independently with an AI-controlled partner or cooperatively with another player. Each level features two players that share the same first-person perspective, but can freely move their own aiming reticle to independently shoot objects. Similar to Resident Evil: The Umbrella Chronicles, players wield a handgun with infinite ammunition and other firearms including a shotgun, sub-machine gun, and magnum. The game also features an 'evade move' technique, which allows players to dodge certain enemy attacks by successfully completing a quick time event. Players are graded at the end of each chapter based on how many enemies killed, objects destroyed, damage taken, completion time and critical hits landed.

There were also some gameplay changes from The Umbrella Chronicles; for example, headshots were made easier for players to perform and a status screen was implemented. The players health bars are now separate, players can pick up and use Green Herbs to replenish their health meter at the push of a button. However, there is only one First Aid spray per-chapter and it is automatically used when the player's health meter hits zero, completely replenishing both health meters at the same time. Players can now customize each of their weapons from Power, Rate of Fire, Capacity, Reload Speed & Stopping Power. The Handgun is now fully customizable as well. The game automatically adjusts its difficulty, depending on the players' skill level. Other new features include online leaderboards and a system to tell the players' reticle apart from each other in a co-op session.

== Development ==
The development of The Darkside Chronicles as a rails shooter was decided because Kawata considered it the best way to retell the scenarios that could not be included in the previous game. With this title, he wanted to put a much bigger emphasis on horror, employing a camera system that will try to convey a sense of actually being in the game. To research realistic camera shaking in hectic situations, one of the team members went out in town for a day to make motion tests with a camcorder. Another important aspect to create the game's atmosphere was achieving high-quality graphics, which Cavia used all their resources for. Kawata was very satisfied with the result and went on to say that the only thing really setting the visuals apart from next-generation consoles is the lack of HD display, also mentioning that there is a plethora of attractive content to use for more games in the Chronicles series and the decision of their development would largely depend on Cavia's future involvement.

As the game's development began before the production of Degeneration and because of the different timeframe, Kawata ruled out connections to this CG film and Resident Evil 5, though he hinted at the appearance of new characters and the exploration of the Birkins' and the Ashfords' family ties.

== Soundtrack ==
For the music of The Darkside Chronicles, series veterans Shusaku Uchiyama and Takeshi Miura have been brought back to compose and arrange tracks for the retellings of the games they originally worked on, with Uchiyama being responsible for Resident Evil 2 and Miura in charge of Code: Veronica. Part of the soundtrack has been recorded with a group of over 40 musicians known as Tokyo Shitsunaigaku Kyokai Co., Ltd. and a chorus of 30 singers. The orchestral arrangements were done by game and anime composer Yoshihisa Hirano who is also highly experienced with classical music.

== Reception ==
Reception

Aggregate score
Aggregator	Score
Metacritic	75/100

Review scores
Publication	Score
1Up.com	A−
Destructoid	8.5/10
Eurogamer	8/10
Game Informer	8/10
GameSpot	6/10
GameSpy	3/5
GamesRadar+	3.5/5
GameZone	7.5/10
Giant Bomb	3/5
IGN	8.1/10
Nintendo Life	8/10
Nintendo World Report	7/10

IGN gave The Darkside Chronicles 8.1 out of 10. Compliments were given to the graphics, music, playability, and longevity of the title, but the camera was said to be mildly distracting and the story can be confusing for those unfamiliar with the Resident Evil franchise. GameSpot gave the game a 6.0 out of 10. They stated, "The only thing scary about this light-gun game is the dreadful shaky camera."

In Japan, the game began as the third best-selling game in the region at 73,000 units sold. In France, the game sold 16,000 units during its debut. In North America, The Darkside Chronicles placed at number 151 on NPD Group's year-end 2009 sales ranking.

In November 2009, Capcom was forced to defend the game from the allegations from the Anglican Church of the United Kingdom, which said that it glamorizes violence and promotes the occult, with spokesperson Leo Tan stating: "This is scaremongering and typical religious hysteria. You cannot blame society's ills on video games. It's just absurd." However, the website Totalvideogames.com states that, in an interview with the clergymen in question, that he never commented on the game, and the whole incident was a misunderstanding. Totalvideogames.com further goes on to say this was all likely a PR stunt.
