= Resident Evil: Operation Raccoon City =

2012 video game

- European cover art
- Developers: Slant Six Games; Capcom
- Publisher: Capcom
- Directors: Andrew Santos; Tuomas Pirinen
- Producer: Peter Doidge-Harrison
- Programmer: Alan Bucior
- Artist: Barry McDougall
- Writer: Amanda Doiron
- Composer: Shusaku Uchiyama
- Series: Resident Evil
- Platforms: PlayStation 3; Xbox 360; Microsoft Windows
- Release: PlayStation 3, Xbox 360: NA: March 20, 2012; AU: March 22, 2012; EU: March 23, 2012; JP: April 26, 2012; Microsoft Windows: NA: May 18, 2012; EU: May 18, 2012; AU: May 24, 2012; JP: July 26, 2012
- Genre: Third-person shooter
- Modes: Single-player, multiplayer

Resident Evil: Operation Raccoon City (Note: Known in Japan as Biohazard: Operation Raccoon City (Japanese: バイオハザード オペレーション・ラクーンシティ, Hepburn: Baiohazādo Operēshon Rakūn Shiti)) is a squad-based third-person shooter video game for Microsoft Windows, PlayStation 3 and Xbox 360, co-developed by Slant Six Games and Capcom. It was released on March 20, 2012, in North America, March 22, 2012, in Australia, March 23, 2012, in Europe and April 26, 2012, in Japan.

It is an installment in the Resident Evil series, being set around the same time as Resident Evil 2 and 3, and featuring the characters from these two games, though it is a non-canon hypothetical scenario. The game follows a group of elite paramilitary private military contractors for the Umbrella Corporation during the zombie outbreak in Raccoon City. The game met with a mixed critical reception, but was a commercial success, selling more than 2.1 million units.

== Gameplay ==
There are 12 playable characters in the game, with six characters for each side. On the Umbrella Security Service team there is: Vector, the team's recon expert, equipped with a cloaking ability; Lupo, the team leader; Beltway, who is proficient in the use of explosives; Spectre, the marksman; Bertha, the medic; Four Eyes, the scientist, with the ability to program the bio-organic weapons (BOWs) and on the United States Special Ops team; Dee-Ay, the team leader; Willow, the recon expert; Tweed, the demolitions expert; Harley, the medic; Shona, the field scientist; and Party Girl, the sniper.

Each character in both campaigns is divided into six separate classes each with their own set of skills and abilities. The classes include Assault; Recon, Surveillance, Field Scientist, Demolitions, and Medic.

Alongside the single player mode, the game also offers four-player co-operative Raccoon Mode, which pits the USS against the U.S. Special Ops teams.

The zombies in the game are able to attack in a multitude of ways. A zombie mutant that gets too close to a character will usually attempt to grapple the character, requiring the player to rapidly shake the analogue stick to avoid getting bitten. Players who are unsuccessful in doing this will be infected for a limited amount of time. Whilst they are infected they gain small bonuses at the expense of a slowly depleting health bar. If a character is bitten and later runs out of time after becoming infected, the character will become uncontrollable and attack their former teammates until killed, allowing the player to respawn. There are additional enemy types in the game besides zombies, such as Lickers, Hunters, and Cerberuses. Furthermore, players are able to control them under certain circumstances.

Heroes Mode is an online multiplayer feature that allows players to play as Leon S. Kennedy, Claire Redfield, Jill Valentine, Carlos Oliveira, Ada Wong, HUNK, Nicholai Ginovaef, and a new character, Lone Wolf. Leon is portrayed by face model Jamisin Matthews. Xbox 360-exclusive Nemesis Mode allows one player to control Nemesis and use him to kill the other team.

== Plot ==
=== USS Campaign ===
Umbrella Security Service (USS) Delta team enters the Raccoon City Underground Laboratory, where they meet up with Alpha team leader HUNK. Their mission is to assist the Alpha team in stopping Dr. William Birkin from handing over his T-virus research to the U.S. military and retrieve the G-virus. On their way to Birkin's lab, they find Birkin has paid numerous Umbrella Biohazard Countermeasure Service (UBCS) private military contractors to work for him while the deal goes forward. When they reach Birkin's lab, the doctor injects himself with the virus, and HUNK stays behind to fight him while Delta team proceeds.

Not long after the battle, it becomes evident that the T-virus has leaked citywide, and people are beginning to transform into flesh-hungry zombies. In what they see as a punishment by USS command, Delta team is ordered to remove evidence of Umbrella's role in the outbreak.

Later, the team is sent out around Raccoon Park to find the Nemesis-T Type, which has gone rogue. A second parasite is injected into its body in order to bring it back under control. Shortly after this mission is completed, the team is then sent out to the Raccoon City Police Department, ordered to kill any surviving police officers and destroy evidence linking the company to the outbreak. The team exits the station, and soon after encounter Leon S. Kennedy, whom they begin to hunt down along with Sherry Birkin. After they find and corner Leon, Claire Redfield, and Sherry, the game can end in two ways: in one ending, half of the team spares Leon and betrays the other and kill them. They then resign from Umbrella over their abandonment during the mission and betray them by letting the three live; in the other, Leon and Claire are executed, and Sherry is sent to an Umbrella facility.

=== Spec Ops Campaign ===
Spec Ops Command deployed the Echo Six team into Raccoon City in order to discover the causes of the outbreak. Heading into Raccoon City Police Department, they meet with Jill Valentine, who is fleeing the Nemesis. She points Umbrella as responsible for the outbreak and advises the team to investigate the City Hall for evidence before parting. There Echo Six finds blueprints of an Umbrella underground laboratory and heads to the sewers to find its entrance, fighting Nemesis along the way.

Moving further into the sewers, Echo Six comes into contact with the mutated Birkin attacking USS soldiers, and Claire Redfield, who is searching for Sherry Birkin. The team escort Claire and find Sherry, before being ambushed by Birkin. Claire takes Sherry away through a doorway as Echo Six covers their escape; they then defeat Birkin and continue their mission.

Finding the underground lab, Echo Six learns that T-virus is the cause of the outbreak and that the G-virus could make the situation worse. They are given orders to collect a sample of the G-virus for further study. Further, into the lab, they learn that Sherry is carrying a G-virus sample, and a Tyrant is being programmed to hunt her down to retrieve it.

Spec Ops Command receives a distress call from Leon S. Kennedy, informing them of the whereabouts of Claire and Sherry; Echo Six is tasked with assisting in their evacuation. In the extraction zone, they are attacked by the Parasite Super Tyrant; Echo Six fights it and kills it. Leon, Claire, and Sherry are then evacuated on the chopper as Command tells Echo Six to stay behind for one last mission that only they can accomplish.

== Development and release ==
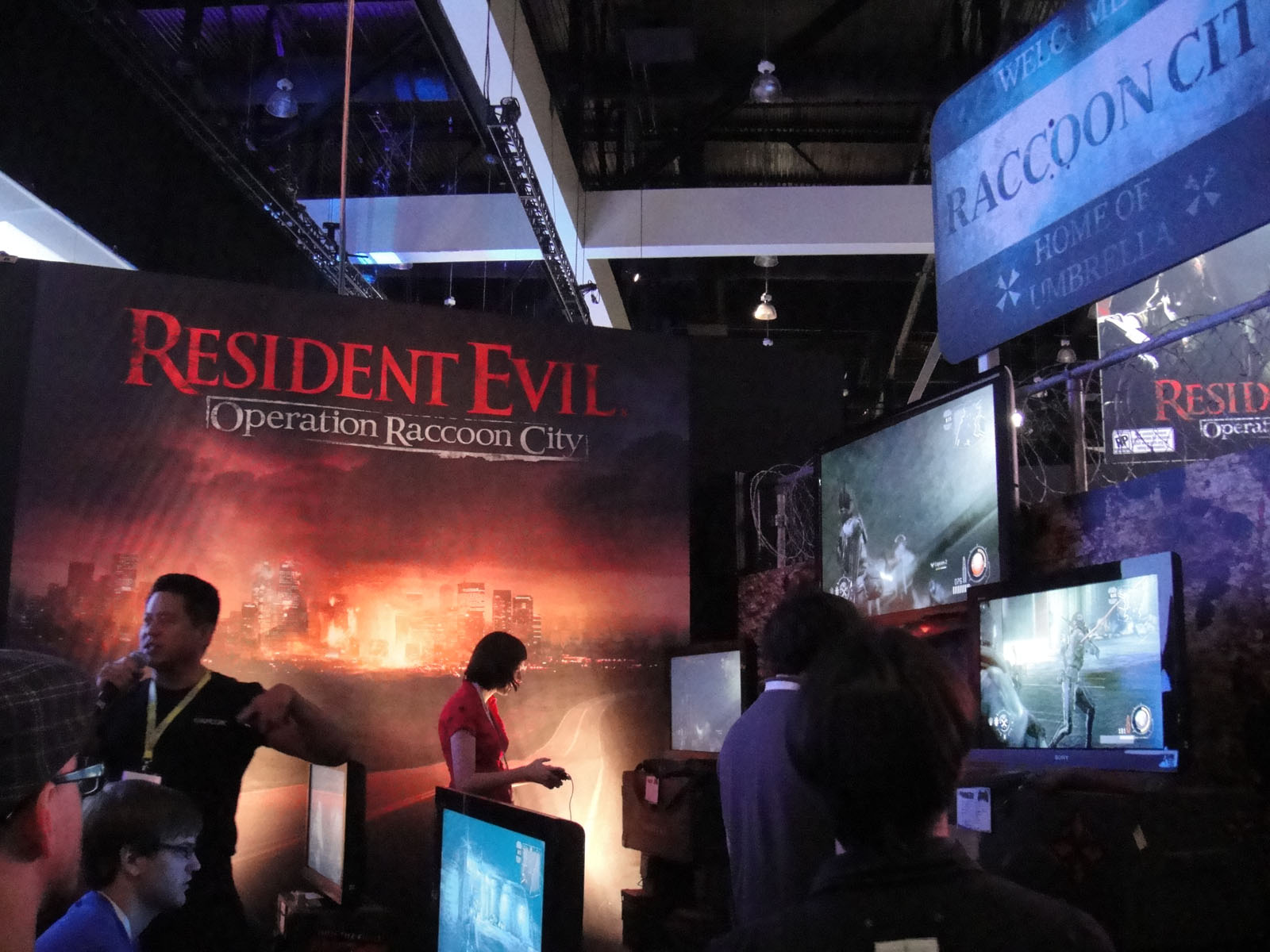
Operation Raccoon City at E3 2011

The idea for the game came about during the development of Lost Planet 2. In November 2010, Kotaku reported on a rumor that Slant Six Games, developer of SOCOM U.S. Navy SEALs: Confrontation, was developing Resident Evil: Raccoon City. On its website, Slant Six Games wrote that it was currently developing "an amazing new project" that was unannounced, which was developed in conjunction with a "new publishing partner on a world class franchise". In March 2011, the game's producer Masachika Kawata estimated it to be 45% complete. According to Kawata, there were discussions on introducing new "bio-organic weapon" enemy creatures into the game.

Free downloadable content containing playable missions for Spec Ops arrived on April 10 for the Xbox 360 and PlayStation 3 and May 10 for Microsoft Windows.

The Xbox 360 version was added to the Xbox One and Xbox Series X/S backwards compatibility list in November 15, 2021. The PlayStation 3 version can be streamed on PlayStation 4 or PlayStation 5.

== Reception ==
Reception

Aggregate scores
Aggregator	Score
GameRankings	(PC) 52.67% (X360) 52.62% (PS3) 48.17%
Metacritic	(X360) 52/100 (PS3) 52/100 (PC) 48/100

Review scores
Publication	Score
Destructoid	7.5/10
Edge	3/10
Eurogamer	4/10
G4	3.5/5
Game Informer	6/10
GameRevolution	1.5/5
GameSpot	4.5/10
GamesRadar+	1.5/5
GamesTM	3/10 (offline); 3/10 (online)
IGN	4/10
Official Xbox Magazine (US)	7/10
The Guardian	4/5
GameShark	B

Resident Evil: Operation Raccoon City received mixed reviews from critics. Aggregating review websites GameRankings and Metacritic gave the PC version 52.67% and 48/100, the Xbox 360 version 52.62% and 52/100 and the PlayStation 3 version 48.17% and 52/100.

Official Xbox Magazine gave it a score of 7.0, as a "satisfying blend of gunplay and teamwork". Destructoid said that the game "suffers from poor design... but that doesn't stop it from being a genuinely good time that should satisfy anybody looking for a hardcore romp." The Guardian said "It's important to bear in mind that it's best experienced multiplayer rather than solo. But it's great fun and adds a fresh spin to a key time and place in the Resident Evil universe." GameShark said: "Raccoon City isn't the next real Resident Evil game (though its improved controls do bode well for that game). Instead, it's a mostly solid third-person, cover-based shooter set in the same universe."

IGN's review stated "An actual zombie outbreak would have been less tragic," calling the game "little more than a poor man's SOCOM and a destitute man's Resident Evil." GameSpot echoed these sentiments, stating that the game "is a frighteningly flawed action-heavy spin-off that withers in the shadow of its superior alternatives".

GamesTM gave the game 3/10, criticising the teammate AI, glitches, and unimaginative set pieces after having played the single player mode GamesTM would revisit the game after its release to review online options, and largely came to the same conclusions, criticising the poor AI and mission design, although they did state that the game was better online than offline. Once again, they awarded the game 3/10. Eurogamer called it an "under-designed and under-produced nightmare...that delivers the bare minimum in every category." GamesRadar summed up its review with "poor design choices, narrative missteps, and technical issues combine to make this one of the worst Resident Evil games to date." Game Informer ended their review with "Not even online play is enough of a reason to warrant checking out this botched experiment with the Resident Evil brand."

Edge gave the game a 3 out of 10, concluding that "it's hard to see what this distinctly low budget shooter has to offer beyond yet another return visit to already blood-saturated and well-trodden ground." GameRevolution even went as far as to say that the game has hurt the Resident Evil brand name, and that the game "should never have had the Resident Evil name attached to it. It smacks of purely business-oriented decision-making. Players are guaranteed to walk into the store and see that name and expect something completely different. It's not fair to consumers and Resident Evil fans alike."

In May 2012, Capcom announced that Operation Raccoon City shipped 2 million units worldwide. Although Capcom considers the game "a big success", the development team found the critical reception "challenging". As of June 2012, the game had sold 2.1 million units worldwide.
