= Resident Evil – Code: Veronica =

2000 video game

- North American cover art
- Developer: Capcom Production Studio 4 (Note: Assistance by XAX Entertainment and Nextech.)
- Publishers: Capcom: Dreamcast; JP/NA: Capcom; EU: Eidos Interactive GameCube; JP/NA/EU: Capcom; AU: Nintendo Australia
- Director: Hiroki Kato
- Producer: Shinji Mikami
- Programmer: Yukihiko Tani
- Artist: Junichi Ota
- Composers: Takeshi Miura; Hijiri Anze; Sanae Kasahara
- Series: Resident Evil
- Engine: MT Framework (PS3/Xbox 360)
- Platforms: Dreamcast; PlayStation 2; GameCube; PlayStation 3; Xbox 360
- Release: February 3, 2000: Dreamcast; JP: February 3, 2000; NA: March 28, 2000; EU: May 26, 2000 Code: Veronica X; Dreamcast; JP: March 22, 2001 PlayStation 2; JP: March 22, 2001; NA: August 22, 2001; EU: September 14, 2001 GameCube; JP: August 7, 2003; NA: December 3, 2003; EU: March 12, 2004 PlayStation 3, Xbox 360; NA: September 27, 2011; EU: September 27, 2011 (X360); EU: September 28, 2011 (PS3); AU: November 15, 2011; JP: March 13, 2012
- Genre: Survival horror
- Mode: Single-player

Resident Evil – Code: Veronica (Note: Known in Japan as Biohazard – Code: Veronica (Japanese: バイオハザード コード：ベロニカ, Hepburn: Baiohazādo Kōdo: Beronika)) is a 2000 survival horror video game developed and published by Capcom for the Dreamcast. It was the first Resident Evil game to debut on a platform other than PlayStation. The story takes place three months after the events of Resident Evil 2 (1998) and the concurrent destruction of Raccoon City as seen in Resident Evil 3: Nemesis (1999). It follows Claire Redfield and her brother Chris Redfield in their efforts to survive a viral outbreak at a remote prison island in the Southern Ocean and a research facility in Antarctica. The game retains the series' traditional controls and gameplay; however, unlike the pre-rendered backgrounds of previous installments, Code: Veronica uses real-time 3D environments and dynamic camera movement.

After producer Shinji Mikami and his team learned they would be unable to port Resident Evil 2 to the Sega Saturn, they began development on an original game, which became Code: Veronica. Claire was designed with a tougher appearance than in Resident Evil 2, with the reason being her past experiences in Raccoon City built her toughness and confidence. Unlike the American horror themes and settings of previous games in the series, Code: Veronica employs a European gothic horror design and settings. This is achieved through the use of gothic architecture and gothic art in addition to the writing style and story presentation.

Capcom announced Code: Veronica in August 1998 and released it in February 2000 after delays and a reduction in sales expectations due to the struggling Dreamcast platform. Sales were weak compared to other Resident Evil games, but strong compared to other Dreamcast games. Code: Veronica received critical acclaim and has been considered among both the best Resident Evil games and Dreamcast games. In 2001, Capcom released an updated version on Dreamcast and PlayStation 2, Code: Veronica X. (Note: Subtitled in Japan as 完全版 (Kanzenban) instead of X, which literally means "Complete version") The revised version included new cutscenes which revealed more details about the story, and it was ported to the GameCube in addition to other platforms in later years. In September 2011, Capcom released a high-definition remastered version of Code: Veronica X for the PlayStation 3 and Xbox 360. Code: Veronica was adapted for Capcom's Gun Survivor series with Resident Evil Survivor 2 – Code: Veronica (2002) and also later adapted for Resident Evil: The Darkside Chronicles (2009). A remake, Resident Evil Veronica, is scheduled for release in 2027.

== Gameplay ==
Claire Redfield firing at zombies. The environments are rendered in real time, unlike previous games which used pre-rendered backgrounds.

Resident Evil – Code: Veronica features survival horror gameplay, similar to previous Resident Evil games. This includes the series' signature controls, interface, puzzles, as well as zombies and monsters to battle. Unlike previous games in the series which used pre-rendered backgrounds, Code: Veronica uses real-time 3D environments. Because of this, the camera is more dynamic than in previous games. The camera will follow, pan, and zoom as the player navigates their character through the environment, similar to Capcom's own Dino Crisis (1999). The story is told through cinematic CGI sequences and real-time cutscenes.

One half of Code: Veronica places the player in control of Claire Redfield while the other half is spent with her brother, Chris. Basic character actions include running, attacking, as well as pushing and climbing objects. Items the player collects can be viewed on the status screen. From here, they can be examined to find clues to solve puzzles, and some can also be equipped. Also available in the status screen is a map and file menu. All notes are saved in game's files and may be essential to solve puzzles. The player can only hold a limited number of items at a given time; other items must be stored in storage boxes located throughout the game.

The player character may receive damage, which can be healed with restore items. Herbs, which restore character health, can be combined with other types of herbs to become more effective. Too much damage will result in a game over. At this point, the game must be continued from the last save point. A partner's death will also result in a game over. Some weapons are better suited for battling certain enemies, some of which have weaknesses to elements like fire or acid. Once the main game is cleared once, a "Battle Mode" is unlocked. This is a minigame in which the player character is given infinite ammo and places them in various locations from the main game with different enemies. In addition to the Redfield siblings, this mode allows the player to control supporting character Steve Burnside and antagonist Albert Wesker, as well as a version of Claire in a new wardrobe.

== Plot ==
In December 1998, three months after escaping from Raccoon City (seen in Resident Evil 2) prior to its eventual destruction (seen in Resident Evil 3: Nemesis), Claire Redfield raids an Umbrella Corporation facility in Paris in search of her brother, Chris Redfield. Discovered by Umbrella's security forces and eventually captured, Claire is imprisoned on Rockfort Island, a prison complex owned by the corporation, situated in the Southern Ocean. She is knocked unconscious after arriving. Sometime after her imprisonment, Claire wakes up and finds herself released by the man who captured her, and discovers that an outbreak of the T-virus has occurred. In the resulting chaos, she finds herself teaming up with Steve Burnside, another inmate seeking to escape.

In their repeated efforts to explore the island and find the means to leave, the pair finds themselves confronting the island's commander, Alfred Ashford. Both Claire and Steve find him to be mentally unstable as a result of him switching between two personalities—his own, and that of his twin sister Alexia. Eventually, the pair manages to find a seaplane and use it to escape, only for Alfred to pursue them and switch their plane to autopilot, directing it towards another Umbrella facility in Antarctica. Upon their arrival, the pair finds that this facility had also suffered an outbreak, and fight their way through the zombies and monsters within to seek a means of escape, battling with Alfred and fatally wounding him. Before he dies, Alfred frees his sister, Alexia, who had been in cryogenic sleep within the facility after injecting herself with the T-Veronica virus, an experimental virus that the Ashford family had developed 15 years ago. Awakened, Alexia manages to recapture Claire and Steve as they attempt to escape.

Meanwhile, Chris Redfield arrives on Rockfort Island in search of Claire, after receiving a message from her via Leon S. Kennedy. Upon learning that she had left, Chris focuses on determining where and begins searching the island. In the process of doing so, he comes across Albert Wesker, an independent agent since the Spencer mansion incident (the events of Resident Evil), who is seeking to retrieve a sample of the T-Veronica virus. After Chris learns of his sister's whereabouts, and Wesker discovers that Alexia is alive and carries what he needs, the two separately find their way to Antarctica. Once there, Chris frees his sister and helps her to search for Steve, only for them to find that he had been experimented with and injected with the T-Veronica virus. After mutating, Steve attempts to kill Claire, but fails, regaining control of himself to turn on Alexia, who then inflicts a mortal wound on him. Before Steve dies, he confesses his love for Claire. Meanwhile, Chris and Wesker confront Alexia. In the resulting conflict, Wesker escapes and manages to retrieve Steve's corpse for further experimentation, while Chris manages to defeat Alexia and escape with his sister, before the Antarctic facility self-destructs.

== Development ==
Claire was designed to be tougher than in Resident Evil 2, as is evident from these moments from the John Woo-inspired opening cinematic.

With the success of Resident Evil 2 in 1998, Capcom began more Resident Evil projects across multiple consoles. Code: Veronica originated from an unsuccessful attempt to port Resident Evil 2 to the Sega Saturn. After producer Shinji Mikami and his team learned they would be unable to port Resident Evil 2 without making a large sacrifice to quality, Mikami was asked by his leadership to create something else for Sega fans, and so development began on an original Saturn game. When Mikami asked for more development time, he was told it would need to have a better technical quality, making Sega's upcoming Dreamcast more appealing.

Around the same time development on the Dreamcast game was starting, a side-story game for the PlayStation starring Jill Valentine in the events leading up to Resident Evil 2 was being developed. It was intended to be a spin-off with the more ambitious Dreamcast game as the true sequel, however, the PlayStation game was made a numbered release (Resident Evil 3), and the Dreamcast game was titled Code: Veronica. To what degree Capcom had considered making Code: Veronica a numbered release is not clear. In interviews at the time, producer Shinji Mikami and Flagship president Yoshiki Okamoto told journalists they wanted to keep the numbered chronology on the PlayStation systems, and give subtitles to Resident Evil games on all other systems. According to a 2009 article by IGN, Sony bartered for limited exclusivity on the "Resident Evil 3" title. In a 2020 interview, Mikami stated that Code: Veronica deserved to be numbered more than Resident Evil 3, but was not because of "political reasons between Capcom and the console manufacturing company."

Code: Veronica's story, setting, and artistic design strayed away from the series standard. While previous games are set in the United States and have a corresponding American feel to them, Code: Veronica is set in the Southern Ocean and Antarctica and carries a European gothic horror inspired design. This is made clear in the environments which feature gothic architecture and art in addition to central European carvings and German-style weaponry. In addition, the gothic feel is emphasized through the story. The horror in Code: Veronica is driven by this story which follows a crazed man and the fate of his noble bloodline. The story is told partly through a lullaby, and this method of storytelling is intended to bring out European operatic undertones. This contrasts to previous games in the series which were driven by the panic elements from American horror films, such as monsters and zombies. With regards to managing the art staff, Mikami split them up depending on their interests. Those interested in guns worked solely on gun designs while those interested in environments researched photographs of houses and castles.

During in-game cutscenes, the polygon count is increased to nearly 2,500 polygons, especially on character faces. Capcom added detail to the zombie enemies unprecedented in the series, such as making their jaws move and eyes twitch. Claire was given a tougher appearance in Code: Veronica than in Resident Evil 2, the reason being her experiences in Resident Evil 2 built her toughness and confidence to handle any situation. This characterization is emphasized by her ability to dual wield sub-machine guns, and also by the opening cinematic which features her in a John Woo-inspired action scene. Mikami described Code: Veronica as 50 to 60% of his perfect vision for Resident Evil in February 2001, and he cited that future Resident Evil projects may make up the other half.

By the time Resident Evil 3 was released, development on Code: Veronica was nearing completion. Much of Code: Veronica's 70-person development staff was outsourced because Capcom resources had been tied up working on Resident Evil 3. Shinji Mikami and Yoshiki Okamoto's team at Flagship oversaw the story and direction, while XAX Entertainment assisted with environments and Nextech handled much of the technical development. Capcom Production Studio 4 still handled art direction and character design. By September 1999, Sega was sending some of its own developers to help add final touches. Sega assisted Capcom with the programming to help keep a good framerate.

== Release ==
Code: Veronica was confirmed to be in development as early as August 1998 and was promoted as the true sequel to Resident Evil 2. It was officially revealed on October 6, 1998, by Capcom R&D chief Yoshiki Okamoto. Capcom of Japan hoped to sell it to roughly one third of all Dreamcast users, which they estimated would total around one million copies. In July 1999, Capcom of Japan announced their shipment expectations for the Japanese Dreamcast version were at 400,000 copies. Journalists were skeptical if this was only the initial shipment, or evidence that Capcom overestimated sales of the Dreamcast, given their initial sales estimate was one million. Capcom initially planned to have Code: Veronica released around the same time as Resident Evil 3 and, more importantly, the Dreamcast launch in North America on September 9, 1999. However, delays pushed the project back to early 2000. To make up for the absence, Capcom announced a port of Resident Evil 2 for the Dreamcast that December. This release, called Biohazard 2: Value Plus, included a demo for Code: Veronica.

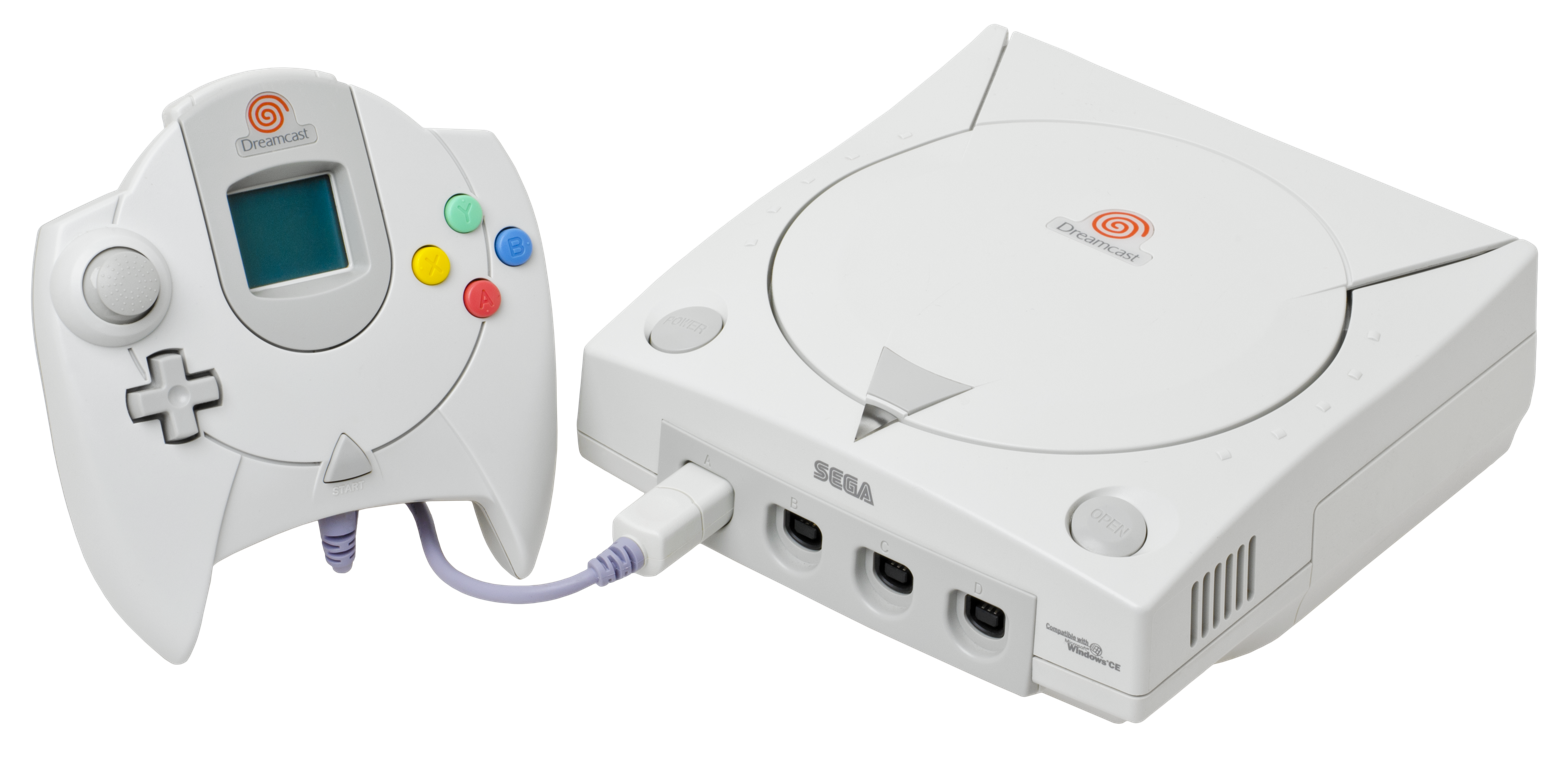
Low sales of the Dreamcast negatively impacted sales of Code: Veronica.

Code: Veronica was released in February 2000. Pre-ordered copies came with a unique numbered tag, special red packaging, and a unique title screen. Limited Dreamcast system bundles were also released to commemorate the release. The "Claire Version", limited to 1,800 copies, consisted of the Code: Veronica game, a transparent red system, transparent red controller, and a VMU. The other bundle, known as the "S.T.A.R.S. Version", has the items except the system is a dark transparent blue and features a "S.T.A.R.S." logo. This bundle was limited to 200 copies. Expecting high demand, Capcom set up a contest for fans to enter to win an opportunity to purchase the systems. A soundtrack was released in February 2000 as well.

=== Code: Veronica X ===
Because the Dreamcast had a small user base, Capcom knew the series would need to continue elsewhere. This led to an expanded version, titled Code: Veronica X in the West and Code: Veronica Kanzenban in Japan, on the PlayStation 2 in 2001. It was also released on the Dreamcast in Japan. The expanded version was announced in November 2000. It has approximately 10 minutes of new cinematic sequences that reveal more about Wesker's involvement with Umbrella. While the core game remained unchanged, several graphical alterations were also made, most notably in the character model for Steve Burnside (who was given a different hairstyle). Capcom printed a video DVD of an in-universe documentary, Wesker's Report, as a pre-order incentive. In North America, the Wesker's Report DVD was also sold on Capcom's website and given to customers who purchased Code: Veronica at specialty retailers such as Electronics Boutique and GameStop. Code: Veronica X was later released on the GameCube along with several other Resident Evil games. It was included with the Biohazard Collector Box for the GameCube in Japan, a bundle of Resident Evil games which also included a copy of Wesker's Report.

A high-definition remastered version of Code: Veronica X was released in September 2011 for the PlayStation 3 and Xbox 360. An emulated version for the PlayStation 3 was released as a PS2 Classic in July 2012 in Japan and in May 2014 in Europe. Another emulated PS2 version was released for the PlayStation 4 in May 2017. The Xbox 360 version was added to the Xbox One backwards-compatible library in February 2019.

== Reception ==
Reception (Dreamcast version)

Aggregate score
Aggregator	Score
Metacritic	94/100

Review scores
Publication	Score
AllGame	4.5/5
Computer and Video Games	5/5
Edge	8/10
Electronic Gaming Monthly	9.5/10, 9.5/10, 10/10
Eurogamer	9/10
Famitsu	9/10, 9/10, 8/10, 9/10
GameFan	94/100, 92/100, 90/100, 96/100
GamePro	4.5/5
GameRevolution	A-
GameSpot	9.5/10
IGN	9.2/10
Next Generation	5/5
Arcade	5/5
Dreamcast Magazine (JP)	9/10, 9/10, 10/10

Code: Veronica received universal acclaim; many critics felt it was the best Resident Evil game at the time, and a "must-own" for the Dreamcast. Derek Williams of AllGame called it the best game for the system along with Soulcalibur (1999). A critic from GameRevolution found it to be the best of all the horror games on the Dreamcast, towering the likes of The House of the Dead 2 (1999), Zombie Revenge (1999), and Carrier (2000). Next Generation dubbed it "the best game yet for Dreamcast—in fact, one of the best games we've seen in the past couple of years."

The atmosphere and presentation received praise. Edge called it "the closest the series has got to emulating a Hollywood action feature". Most reviewers found the graphics as being some of the very best on the Dreamcast and being a testament to the power of its hardware. Along with this, critics pointed out Code: Veronica's use of real-time backgrounds and a dynamic camera as an improvement from the pre-rendered backgrounds of previous series entries. The CGI sequences were also praised, especially the opening cinematic. The use of music and sound was called "top-notch" and "perfect". The story received positive reviews. Maura Sutton of Computer and Video Games praised the adult twist on the narrative. Some critics found that despite improvements, Code: Veronica inherited the good and bad qualities of previous Resident Evil games. The controls were criticized by reviews.

Reception (PS2 version)

Review score
Publication	Score
Famitsu	9/10, 7/10, 7/10, 9/10

Reviews for the PlayStation 2 release of Code: Veronica X were mostly positive. Critics shared similar opinions to the Dreamcast reviews, but some complaints were drawn from it being a mostly unmodified port of an 18-month-old Dreamcast game. GameSpot's Joe Fielder pointed out that Sony's Extermination (2001) and Capcom's own Onimusha: Warlords (2001) had been released during this gap with better controls. The GameCube version garnered average reviews, due to its unaltered, ported status. The high definition remaster was released over a decade after the original and was welcomed with mediocre reviews. Critics commonly cited the archaic design and controls as making it less appealing compared with contemporary offerings. The remaster did find some positive reception from Game Informer's Tim Turi who found enjoyment from playing what he called a "challenging classic survival horror game" and "a harrowing but memorable trek through the series' heyday."

Code: Veronica won GameSpot's annual "Best Adventure Game" award among console games, and was a runner-up for the publication's "Best Dreamcast Game", "Best Sound", "Best Graphics, Technical" and overall "Game of the Year" prizes. The editors argued that "Code Veronica is the culmination of everything the developers of the Resident Evil series seemed to be trying to accomplish." The following year, Veronica X was nominated for GameSpot's annual "Best Action/Adventure Game" prize among console games, which went to Grand Theft Auto III.

=== Sales ===
Code: Veronica outsold Shenmue (1999) within its first week on shelves in February 2000. In total, the Dreamcast version sold almost 450,000 units in the United States and 1.14 million copies worldwide. The sales were weak compared to series predecessors, but strong compared to other Dreamcast games. In Germany, the Dreamcast version debuted at number one on Media Control's Dreamcast sales chart in May 2000 and it remained at number one for three consecutive months. In Spain, Resident Evil Code: Veronica topped Centro Mail's Dreamcast sales chart for three consecutive months in 2000. In Brazil, Resident Evil – Code: Veronica ranked eighth among Tec Toy's best-selling Dreamcast games, according to a company sales study published by UOL in 2004.

The PlayStation 2 version of Code: Veronica X had sold 900,000 copies and earned $27 million in the United States by July 2006, outselling Resident Evil 4. The PS2 version went on to sell 1.4 million copies worldwide, for a total of 2.54 million units sold worldwide for both the Dreamcast and PS2 versions.

Next Generation ranked Code: Veronica as the 63rd-highest-selling game launched for the PlayStation 2, Xbox or GameCube between January 2000 and July 2006 in the United States. Combined console sales of Resident Evil franchise released in the 2000s reached 3 million copies in the United States by July 2006.

== Legacy ==
Aaron Boehm of Bloody Disgusting described Code: Veronica as one of the era's most memorable survival horror games. Game Informer ranked Code: Veronica the 69th-best game in 2001, while GamesRadar+ named it the 14th-best Dreamcast game. Code: Veronica is notorious for allowing players to become softlocked.

The Code: Veronica story has been adapted into other works. Resident Evil Survivor 2 – Code: Veronica (2001) for Naomi-based arcades and PlayStation 2 follows the story of Code: Veronica from a first-person view with light gun shooter-style gameplay. Similarly, another light gun game, Resident Evil: The Darkside Chronicles (2009) was released for the Wii and features sequences set in Code: Veronica along with Resident Evil 2. As with previous Resident Evil games, the story was adapted into a novel written by S. D. Perry. A miniseries comic was published by DC Comics.

=== Remake ===
In the years following its release, requests for a remake of Code: Veronica ranked highly in fan polls and from publications including IGN. A demo of a fan remake was released in 2021. The project was shut down by Capcom in 2022. Capcom announced a full remake, Resident Evil Veronica, at Summer Game Fest on June 5, 2026. It is scheduled for release in 2027 for Nintendo Switch 2, PlayStation 5, Windows, and Xbox Series X/S.
