= List of Resident Evil characters =

Promotional artwork featuring the various characters of the Resident Evil video game series.

Resident Evil is a horror game media franchise created by Capcom. The series' success has led to a live-action film series, animated films, television series, comic books, novels, audiobooks, and merchandise. The franchise features an extensive cast of characters in its horror-based narratives.

== Protagonists ==
=== Chris Redfield ===
Chris is first introduced in Resident Evil as a pointman for the Raccoon City Police Department's S.T.A.R.S. Alpha Team. In the fight against Bio-Organic Weapons (B.O.W.), Chris becomes a co-founder of the B.S.A.A., a counter-terrorism organization dedicated to fighting the threat of B.O.W.s unleashed by criminal or terrorist elements on a global scale.

=== Jill Valentine ===
Jill is first introduced in Resident Evil as a member of the Raccoon Police Department's S.T.A.R.S. Alpha Team. Jill is a co-founder of the B.S.A.A., a counter-terrorism organization dedicated to fighting the threat of Bio-Organic Weapons (B.O.W.) unleashed by criminal or terrorist elements on a global scale.

=== Barry Burton ===
Barry is first introduced in Resident Evil as a supporting character and a member of the S.T.A.R.S. team. He later returns as a playable character in Resident Evil: Revelations 2, as well as the non-canon Resident Evil Gaiden.

=== Rebecca Chambers ===
Rebecca Chambers is first introduced in Resident Evil as a supporting character and field medic of the S.T.A.R.S. team. Rebecca also appears as the co-protagonist of Resident Evil Zero along with Billy Coen.

=== Leon S. Kennedy ===
Leon Kennedy is first introduced in Resident Evil 2 as a rookie police officer in the Raccoon City Police Department who escapes from Raccoon City following a zombie outbreak. He is revealed in Resident Evil 4 to have been recruited by the US federal government and trained to become an elite agent who reports directly to the president of the United States. Leon proceeds to serve as a playable protagonist in Resident Evil 6 and Resident Evil Requiem.

=== Claire Redfield ===
Claire is first introduced in Resident Evil 2 as a college student looking for her older brother Chris Redfield. She is depicted in subsequent sequels as a worker for a human rights organization called TerraSave, which provides relief and aid to victims of bioterrorism.

=== Ada Wong ===
Ada Wong is first introduced in Resident Evil 2 as a corporate spy and mercenary. Her clientele has included Albert Wesker and a mysterious organization known only as "The Organization". Ada is occasionally featured as the main character of select scenarios or campaigns in the franchise's video games. She has a very complicated unresolved relationship with Leon S. Kennedy.

=== Ethan Winters ===
The main character of Resident Evil 7: Biohazard and Resident Evil Village, Ethan is introduced as a system engineer in the city, a civilian who travels to the Bakers' dilapidated family estate in Dulvey, Louisiana in search of his missing wife Mia, and is later relocated to an undisclosed location in Eastern Europe following the events of Resident Evil 7.

=== Grace Ashcroft ===
A main character of Resident Evil Requiem alongside Leon, Grace is introduced as a technical analyst for the Federal Bureau of Investigation, the daughter of investigative reporter and Raccoon City survivor Alyssa Ashcroft, and was sent on the orders of her superior, to investigate the most recent of rash of mysterious infections and deaths, the latest of which occurred at the Wrenwood Hotel, an abandoned hotel located in Midwestern where her mother was murdered eight years prior.

== Supporting characters ==
=== Albert Wesker ===
Albert Wesker is first introduced in Resident Evil as a triple agent who poses as the leader of S.T.A.R.S. team, and in subsequent sequels as a high-ranking Umbrella Corporation scientist who undermines the pharmaceutical organization on behalf of a rival company with the goal of global saturation.

=== Sherry Birkin ===
Sherry Birkin (シェリー・バーキン, Sherī Bākin) is the daughter of William and Annette Birkin. She first appears in Resident Evil 2, running away and hiding in Raccoon City during the outbreak. Her father has been transformed into a monstrous creature by the G-virus and infects her, but Claire gives Sherry an anti-virus, which prevents her from mutating. Sherry assists Leon and Claire in boarding a secret underground train, and successfully escapes Raccoon City before it is destroyed. Sherry also appears in Resident Evil: The Darkside Chronicles in chapters that recapitulate the events of Resident Evil 2. She returns as an adult in Resident Evil 6 as a government agent escorting Jake Muller and seemingly acquires enhanced healing abilities from the remnants of the G-virus in her body. She also appears in the sequel Resident Evil Requiem.

=== William Birkin ===
William Birkin (ウィリアム・バーキン, Wiriamu Bākin) is one of the main antagonists in the Resident Evil series, specifically Resident Evil 2. After completing his G-virus project (Golgotha virus), he is mortally wounded by agents of the Umbrella Special Forces and his work is stolen. Left for dead, he injects himself with the G-virus, thus turning himself into a monster known as "G". He then kills his attackers, causing a T-virus vial to be leaked into the city's drainage system, resulting in the zombie outbreak in Raccoon City.

=== HUNK ===
Voiced by (English): Keith Silverstein (The Umbrella Chronicles, The Darkside Chronicles, Operation Raccoon City, Revelations, REmake 2)
Voiced by (Japanese): Masaki Terasoma (Operation Raccoon City, Revelations, REmake 2)

HUNK (ハンク, Hanku) is an enigmatic special forces agent of the Umbrella Security Service unit in Resident Evil 2. His notoriety for being the sole survivor of multiple operations earned him the moniker 'Grim Reaper'. HUNK initially appears in Resident Evil 2, where he is playable in a secret minigame titled "4th Survivor". This short scenario entails HUNK's journey to escape Raccoon City, beginning with his awakening in the sewers and eventually leading to his extraction from the city. He is the only member of his unit to survive the attack of the mutated William Birkin that takes place shortly after he secured a sample of the G-virus for Umbrella. He reappears in The Umbrella Chronicles, in a remake of the "4th Survivor" scenario where the player must reach the helipad for extraction from Raccoon City, and during the "Memories of a Lost City" scenario in Resident Evil: The Darkside Chronicles. HUNK is playable in the "Mercenaries" minigame in Resident Evil 4, but has no relation to the story. HUNK appears as a side character in non-canon Resident Evil: Operation Raccoon City, where he works with other Umbrella Security Service operatives to recover a sample of the G-virus prior to the events of Resident Evil 2. He is also a playable character in Resident Evil: The Mercenaries 3D, Resident Evil: Revelations and Resident Evil: Revelations 2. In Resident Evil Requiem, a boss encounter named The Commander is strongly implied to be HUNK, where the Commander and Leon Kennedy engage in hand-to-hand combat, which ends with Leon emerging victorious and slitting the Commander's throat; however after Leon leaves, the Commander's body disappears.

=== Carlos Oliveira ===
Voiced by (English): Vince Corazza (RE3), Scott McNeil (Under the Skin), Kim Strauss (The Umbrella Chronicles), Gideon Emery (Operation Raccoon City), Jeff Schine (REmake 3)
Voiced by (Japanese): Hiroki Yasumoto (REmake 3)
Motion Capture performance: Jeff Schine (REmake 3)
Facial Model: Benson Mokhtar (REmake 3)
Played by: Oded Fehr (Apocalypse, Extinction, Retribution)

Carlos Oliveira was a mercenary for the Umbrella Biohazard Countermeasure Service (U.B.C.S.). He held the rank of Corporal, and served in their Delta Platoon as rear security for Alpha Squad, where he was also their heavy weapons specialist. Oliveira is also one of the few survivors of the deployed squads who served during Raccoon City Destruction Incident.

=== Ashley Graham ===
Ashley Graham is the new U.S. President's daughter in Resident Evil 4. A college student living in Massachusetts, Ashley is abducted by a mysterious cult while attempting to return to her home. She is taken to a remote part of Spain and held captive in a village inhabited by humans infected with mind-controlling parasites. The cult's leader, Osmund Saddler, plans to infect her with Las Plagas, to carry out the cult's secret agenda. She is rescued by Leon, and works alongside him to thwart the cult's plans and escape. In addition to being able to receive commands and perform simple tasks, Ashley briefly becomes a playable character for a portion of the game.

=== Luis Serra ===
Luis Serra Navarro (ルイス・セラ・ナヴァッロ) is a former researcher working for the cult Los Illuminados. He supports Leon S. Kennedy in his mission to rescue Ashley Graham in Resident Evil 4. Secretly, he is also in contact with Ada Wong and helps her recover a sample of the Plaga parasite for her employers. The 2023 remake reveals that Luis was also a former employee of the Umbrella Corporation.

=== Ingrid Hunnigan ===
Voiced by (English): Salli Saffioti (RE4, Degeneration, Damnation, RE6, Death Island), Raylene Harewood (REmake 4)
Voiced by (Japanese): Yū Sugimoto (Degeneration, Damnation, RE6, REmake 4)
Motion Capture performance: Jolene Andersen (Damnation)

Ingrid Hunnigan serves as Leon S. Kennedy's Case Officer. As an F.O.S. agent (Field Operations Support) Hunnigan provides Leon with tactical information relevant to his current situation. She assisted him during his missions to rescue Ashley Graham in Resident Evil 4 and to stop Neo-Umbrella in Resident Evil 6. She also makes brief appearances in Resident Evil: Degeneration and Resident Evil: Damnation, plus Resident Evil: Death Island.

=== The Merchant ===
The Merchant is a mysterious vendor operating in the rural Spanish area. He appears as a supporting character in Resident Evil 4, providing player characters with weapons, items and upgrades for pesetas. The character is also alluded to in Resident Evil Village.

=== Sheva Alomar ===
Sheva Alomar is a B.S.A.A. operative of the West African region in Kijuju. She serves as a companion and a secondary playable character alongside Chris Redfield in Resident Evil 5.

=== Mia Winters ===
Voiced by (English): Katie O'Hagan
Voiced by (Japanese): Akari Higuchi

Mia Winters is the spouse of Ethan Winters, the main character in Resident Evil 7: Biohazard. A researcher for a criminal organization called The Connections, Mia was tasked with escorting a bio-weapon called Eveline to another facility. But the tanker crashes in a Louisianan swamp during a hurricane, with Mia infected by Eveline as they end up with the Baker family. As the result of her infection, Mia lashes out at Ethan when he came looking for her. From that point on, Mia works with a woman called Zoe (who is revealed to be a Baker) and Ethan tries to save them by receiving hints from Zoe when she telephones him, while Ethan is having to deal with constant attacks perpetrated by the other Bakers. After using one of the two serums Zoe created to kill Jack Baker, Ethan used the remaining vial on Mia as they are forced to leave Zoe behind. The two end up at the remains of the tanker, Mia regaining her memories while resisting Eveline to give Ethan samples from Eveline to develop a toxin to kill her with. She is reunited with Ethan after being rescued by BSAA agents, later giving birth to Rosemary while not telling Ethan the truth that he was infected with the Mold as they moved to Eastern Europe.

In the events of Resident Evil Village, Mia is abducted by her former colleague Miranda, who assumed her identity to steal Rose as a vessel for her lost child Eva. Mia ends up being rescued by Chris and revealing Ethan's altered nature when told that Jack Baker killed him. After Ethan permanently died destroying the megamycete, Mia raised Rosemary while Chris would later train the girl in using her abilities.

=== Rosemary Winters ===
Voiced by (English): Jeannie Tirado
Voiced by (Japanese): Yurianne Eve
Facial Model: Linde Baars

Rosemary Winters is the daughter of Ethan Winters and his wife Mia. In Resident Evil Village, she is kidnapped by Mother Miranda, who intends to use her latent powers inherited from her parents to resurrect her own daughter, Eva. After Chris Redfield rescued the real Mia, whom Miranda kidnapped and impersonated, Rosemary is revealed to be a half-Mold through her father's exact nature as a sentient Mold. With the help of Chris, Ethan rescues Rosemary from Miranda but at the cost of his own life.

Rose also serves as the playable character in Village's DLC chapter Shadows of Rose, set sixteen years after the main events of the game. Files reveal that Rose grew up an outcast due to her nature and abilities that manifested throughout her childhood. Rose has also grown distant from her mother and trained by Chris, even being scouted for Hound Wolf Squad. After learning that she can remove her powers, she enters the realm of the Megamycete to recover a crystal capable of doing so. Navigating the realm, she faces both its twisted creations and remnants of those connected to the Megamycete, such as Eveline and a replica of the Duke. Rose also receives assistance from an entity calling himself Michael, though she eventually learns it to be the remnant of her father Ethan. After acquiring the crystal, Rose learns that it was actually a trap set by the remnant of Miranda, who lured her into the realm in another attempt to resurrect Eva through her. With help from Ethan, Rose is able to regain her powers and kills Miranda for good. Having been able to meet her father, Rose leaves the realm content with her nature.
