= Resident Evil 1.5 =

Cancelled video game

- Gameplay screenshot of Resident Evil 1.5, showing protagonist Elza Walker and a more modern Raccoon Police Station
- Developer: Capcom
- Director: Hideki Kamiya
- Producer: Shinji Mikami
- Series: Resident Evil
- Platform: PlayStation
- Genre: Survival horror
- Mode: Single-player

Resident Evil 1.5 is the unofficial name given to a canceled prototype of the 1998 survival horror game Resident Evil 2. It was developed by Capcom for the PlayStation, directed by Hideki Kamiya and produced by Shinji Mikami.

Resident Evil 2 entered development a month after the completion of Resident Evil in early 1996. It featured the biker Elza Walker, rather than Claire Redfield, as the playable character alongside the police officer Leon S. Kennedy. It reached 60–80% completion before development was restarted.

With rumors of leaked builds circulating since the 1990s, Resident Evil 1.5 became the focus of fans and video game preservationists to obtain and release a copy to the public. Purchased by a small group of fans in 2011 from a video game collector and kept private, a half-finished version leaked online in 2013. While it is theorized that Capcom possesses a more complete version of the game, it has never been shared in any capacity. Despite its unofficial status, 1.5's existence has been publicly referenced by Capcom, who included Elza's motorcycle suit as an unlockable costume for Claire in Resident Evil 2's remake.

== Gameplay ==
Resident Evil 1.5 was similar to the final Resident Evil 2, but had some differences in its mechanics. It featured fewer puzzles, and a more standard keycard system to unlock areas. Vials of medicine replaced the first game's healing herbs, and players were able to equip two tiers of upgraded armor, an RPD bulletproof vest and high-tech Umbrella Corporation body armor, represented visually on their character model. Rather than a character limping when injured, their clothing would gradually become more damaged.

== Plot ==
=== Characters ===
The story of Resident Evil 1.5 was split into two scenarios that both took place during a zombie outbreak in Raccoon City, similar to Resident Evil 2. In 1.5, the story lines had separate player characters and never overlapped. While the actions of one character affected the environment of the other, they did not directly encounter each other. They would have their own NPCs who helped them escape, who, despite being featured in the final game, were significantly different in 1.5.

- Leon S. Kennedy – A police officer and protagonist who was already on the roof of the Raccoon Police Station, attempting to defend it from undead. He was conceived as a veteran in 1.5 and carried over into the final game as a rookie entering town.
- Elza Walker – A blonde motorcyclist, college student and protagonist who fled for safety at the police station, crashing her bike into its front entrance. Elza was replaced by Claire Redfield in the final game. Despite having similar traits as Claire, she was not related to any existing characters.
- Marvin Branagh – A police officer who was Leon's sidekick in 1.5, surviving through most, if not all, of the game. He dies from a zombie infection partway through Resident Evil 2.
- Linda – An Asian Umbrella Corporation researcher found by Leon, who was tasked with retrieving the G-Virus. She was carried over in Resident Evil 2 as a spy and mercenary named Ada Wong with her objective retained.
- John – A fellow civilian found in an RPD prison cell and Elza's sidekick, whose role was later divided between Robert Kendo, owner of the gun store, and Ben Bertolucci, a reporter, in the finished game.
- Sherry Birkin – A lone little girl found by Elza, who was also featured in Resident Evil 2 with a similar role.
- Roy – Leon's superior officer who helps Elza and John escape. He later became zombified. Roy was removed from the finished game.

Characters who appeared in both routes included:

- Brian Irons – A police chief who was initially a helpful and professional supporting character rather than insane and villainous.
- Annette Birkin – An Umbrella Corporation researcher, William's wife and mother of their daughter Sherry. Concept art depicted her as a mutant infected with the G-Virus, though it is unknown if this was to occur in game and whether the idea was repurposed for or inspired by William.
- William Birkin – An Umbrella Corporation researcher and antagonist who was without most of his transformations.

=== Story ===
While the story of 1.5 generally resembled its final incarnation, some aspects were different. As the developers had assumed the first game would not be a massive success, the sequel was intended to be the conclusion of the series and put all unanswered questions to rest. Umbrella Corporation, rather than escaping any serious responsibility for the events of Resident Evil, is instead closed down entirely based on the testimony of the surviving members of STARS. The T-Virus is spread throughout Raccoon City by escaped creatures from Umbrella's underground labs. After fighting through the police station, which looked more modern, as the idea to depict it as a former museum had not yet materialized, both characters then travel into the sewers in search of Umbrella's secret lab, ending up being forced to fight William Birkin. Because much of the story text, as well as the game's full motion videos, are missing from leaked builds, it is difficult to piece together specific details.

== Development ==
Resident Evil 2 was originally scheduled for a May 1997 release date, with Shinji Mikami as producer and Hideki Kamiya as director. Features that were being experimented with included a large amount of zombies on screen, made possible via lower polygon counts, and the ability of monsters to mutate over time. Both the game's pre-rendered backgrounds, and the outfits of the main characters, could be altered based on story events and what items the characters equipped. However, as the 1.5 version approached release and was 60–80% completed, the development team began to feel unsatisfied with the game, with Mikami stating in a later 1998 interview that "no one element was specifically boring, just everything as a whole", adding in a different interview that the game "was no fun". The Raccoon Police Station, initially heavily inspired by the 1976 film Assault on Precinct 13, was seen as visually uninteresting compared to Spencer Mansion, and was redesigned based on photographic references that the team was "told off" for taking. Additionally, the low polygon counts caused the zombies to not be scary enough, despite their large number. The team did not enjoy the lack of a link to the previous game, bringing in Noboru Sugimura, then a professional script writer, as a consultant. He advised them to restart development to remedy the issues.

The game's first delay, announced in February 1997, pushed the release date back to August as the game was reworked into what eventually became Resident Evil 2. The delay allowed developers to improve the game's core code, which was later described by data miners as having "poorly optimized" aspects. In the meantime, various builds of 1.5 were used to promote the game at demos and trade shows. While the last public appearance of 1.5 is widely considered to be at the April 1997 Tokyo Game Show, Hyper PlayStation Remix, a Japanese gaming magazine, seemingly had access to content from the 1.5 version as late as December 1997. Adding to the confusion amongst fans, as well as the legendary status of the game, a promotional video from the 1997 E3 used footage spliced together from both 1.5 and an initial build of 2, causing fans to believe a third version existed. Resident Evil: Director's Cut was released to fill the gap caused by the delay. The Japanese release of Director's Cut Dual Shock Ver. included a bonus disc containing clips of cut content, such as a burning laboratory, fights with zombie apes and a Human-Spider hybrid. One of the early demo versions of Resident Evil 2 contained leftover 1.5 backgrounds and assets on the disc, which became essential for subsequent attempts at rebuilding and understanding the lost game.

== Unofficial release ==
While never released by Capcom in an official capacity, online rumors of development builds of the game being in circulation were common in the late 1990s and early 2000s, and the game has numerous times been subjected to hoaxes and unproven claims of people possessing copies. A partially-complete demo version, often dubbed the "40% build", was obtained by a private collector in 2007. This same build would in 2012 serve as the foundation of a restoration mod developed by Team IGAS (I've Got A Shotgun). A playable version of IGAS' work was released in February 2013. This build has popularly been referred to as the "Magic Zombie Door" (MZD) build, and has served as the foundation for subsequent mods and restoration patches by other teams. An improperly dumped version of the original "40% build" was released in June 2013, subsequently followed by the release of a properly dumped one, without a watermark, from Team IGAS' original copy of the disc.

== Legacy ==
Capcom included a nod to 1.5 in the deluxe edition of the remake of Resident Evil 2, adding a costume for Claire that was based on the original concept art for Elza Walker, the character she later replaced. Progress by fans on recreating the game continues, with various patches being released.
