= Raccoon City =

Fictional city from Resident Evil

- Resident Evil location
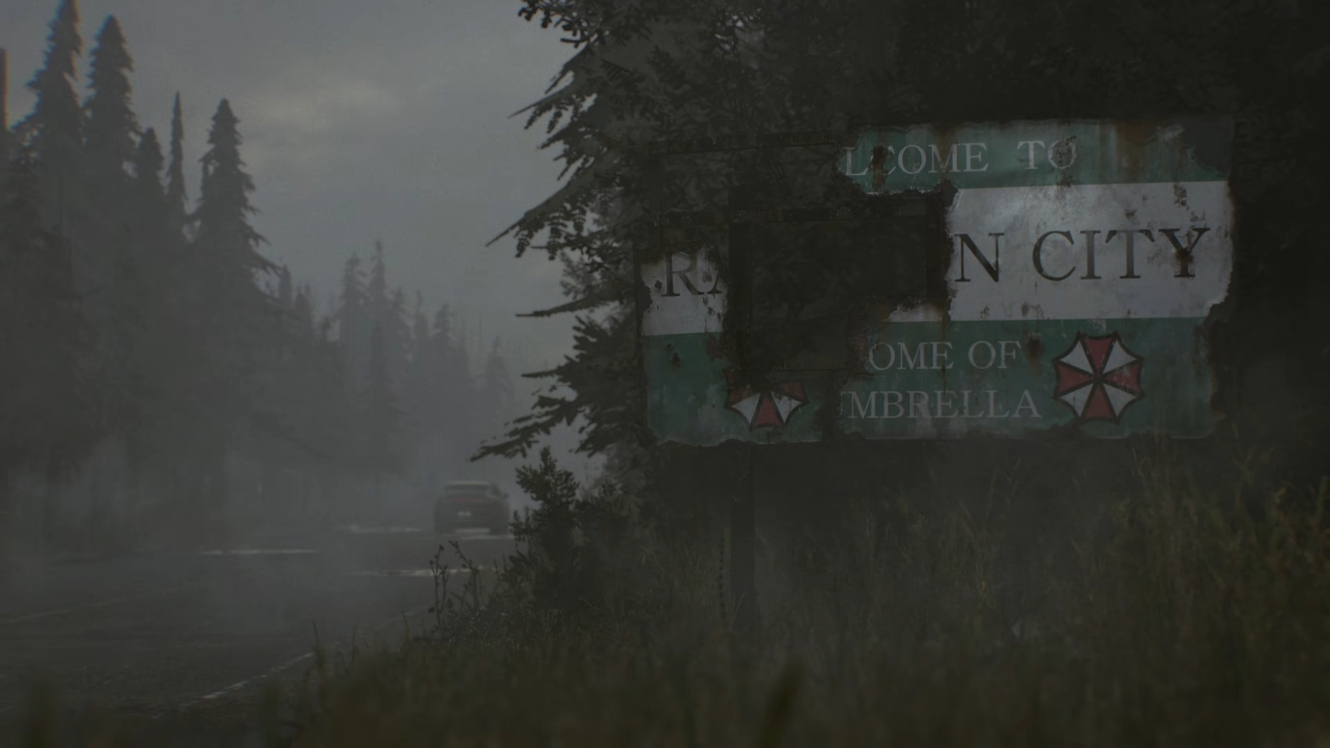
- Screenshot showing a damaged roadside sign for Raccoon City in a trailer for Resident Evil Requiem
- First appearance: Resident Evil (1996)
- Last appearance: Resident Evil (2026)
- Created by: Capcom
- Genre: Video game

In-universe information
- Type: City
- Location: Arklay County, Midwestern United States

Raccoon City (ラクーンシティ, Rakūn Shiti) is a fictional city in Arklay County in the Midwestern United States that appears in the Resident Evil series of survival horror video games developed by Capcom. It is a central location for the franchise; an underground lab for the evil Umbrella Corporation was constructed beneath it, unbeknownst to most of its citizens. The lab covertly manufactures deadly bioweapons and monsters, the unauthorized release of which causes a zombie apocalypse within the city from which various characters, including Leon S. Kennedy, Claire Redfield, and Jill Valentine, must escape, the latter while pursued by the bioweapons.

Spencer Mansion, the setting of Resident Evil, is built nearby, and the city itself was the primary setting of Resident Evil 2, a portion of which is set within the Raccoon Police Station. The city reappears in Resident Evil 3: Nemesis and the spin-offs Resident Evil: Outbreak and Resident Evil: Outbreak: File 2. A destroyed Raccoon City and police station returns decades later as a main setting for Resident Evil Requiem. The city is also the primary location for the first film adaptation, its sequel, and the 2021 and 2026 reboots. Outside of the Resident Evil series, Raccoon City has been modded into Left 4 Dead as a playable map.

== Concept and design ==
The original Resident Evil was initially intended as a remake of the 1989 video game Sweet Home, which took place in a haunted mansion in the Japanese countryside, but Capcom no longer held the rights. Therefore, producer Tokuro Fujiwara and director Shinji Mikami searched for ideas for a new setting entirely. They drew heavy inspiration from the works of horror filmmaker George A. Romero, who shot his zombie films in the environs of Pittsburgh, Pennsylvania, and decided to go with an "Anytown, USA" setting to appeal to a Western audience. The city was initially named "Harnbee", but was renamed to "Raccoon City". While a longstanding theory is that the city was named after the tanuki, which features heavily in pop culture, the name refers specifically to the North American mammal due to its purposeful English transliteration. MeriStation analyzed the design of the city in the original Resident Evil 2 and 3 and said it resembles more of a Japanese city than an American one due to the narrow streets. North Street and Fleet Street in Boston, Massachusetts, were used for Raccoon City in the opening monologue of the original Resident Evil 3. In the Resident Evil 2 remake, the city's skyline is based on Montreal, Quebec, in Central Canada. The instructions manual for the original Resident Evil 2 described Raccoon City as a small hamlet.

== Appearances ==
=== In video games ===
In the canon of the video games, Raccoon City is located in the Midwestern United States. Founded in the 1800s, it was largely unremarkable until the 1960s, when Oswell E. Spencer commissioned the construction of Spencer Mansion in the Arklay Mountains near the city. A research facility was constructed beneath that served as the basis for Umbrella Corporation's research. Umbrella expanded into Raccoon City, revitalizing its economy and becoming its largest employer. Meanwhile, they built two massive NEST facilities under the city that developed BOWs, or bio-organic weapons.

In the events of Resident Evil, Umbrella's grip on Raccoon City begins to break down when monsters from Spencer Mansion escape containment, resulting in the deployment of the special operations team STARS, though it was intended as a cover-up, with the villainous STARS member Albert Wesker secretly working for Umbrella. While the surviving STARS members manage to escape, the cover-up fails to neutralize all of the escaped monsters, causing further suspicion. Believing Umbrella's secrets are about to be discovered, researcher William Birkin plans to turn himself over to the United States government in a plea bargain, but is hunted down by Umbrella. He infects himself with the G-Virus in an attempt to fight back, and rats that gnaw on the dead Umbrella soldiers cause a T-Virus outbreak throughout Raccoon City.

Following the events of Resident Evil 2 and 3, the city is completely overrun by zombies, and an experimental thermobaric missile is launched by the President to level the city, which staunches the outbreak completely, killing 100,000 people. Alyssa Ashcroft, a survivor of the incident, revealed the presence of BOWs to the world, causing Umbrella to collapse. Resident Evil Requiem reveals that a separate facility, ARK, was also constructed beneath Raccoon City, which contains Elpis, a presumed virus believed by the Connections crime syndicate to be Spencer's ultimate creation capable of controlling minds, and that the missile was intended to it up. Victor Gideon, a former Umbrella scientist, works together with another member, Zeno, to kidnap Alyssa's daughter Grace, believing that she knew how to unlock Elpis. At the climax of the game's story, it is discovered to be a powerful antiviral serum that cures Progenitor-based viruses, among them the T-Virus and Raccoon City Syndrome affecting survivors of the Raccoon City Incident including Leon S. Kennedy and Sherry Birkin, as a means for Spencer to atone for his sins.

Raccoon City appears as one of the levels in Capcom's Under the Skin. A replica of the town is featured in Umbrella Corps.

=== In films and television ===
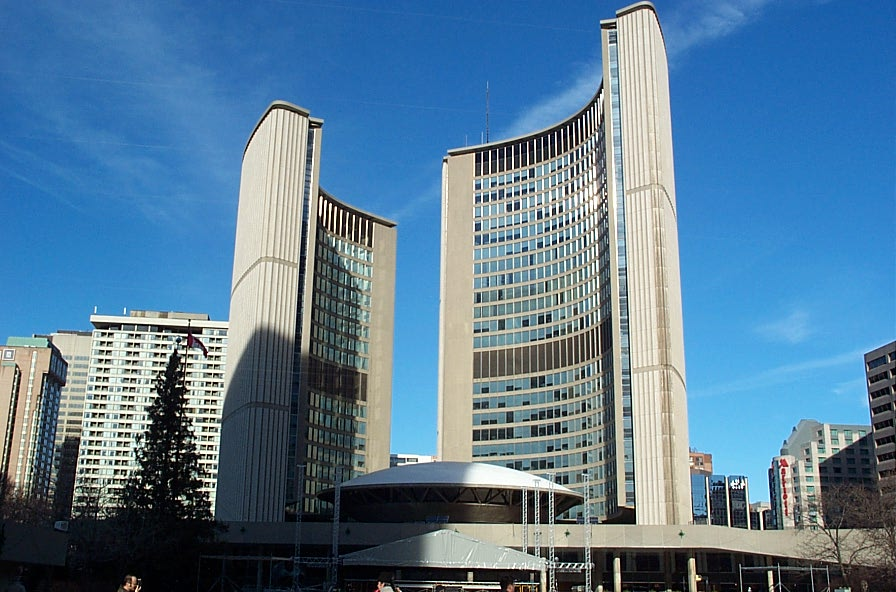
The Toronto City Hall, on which the city hall of Raccoon City was based.

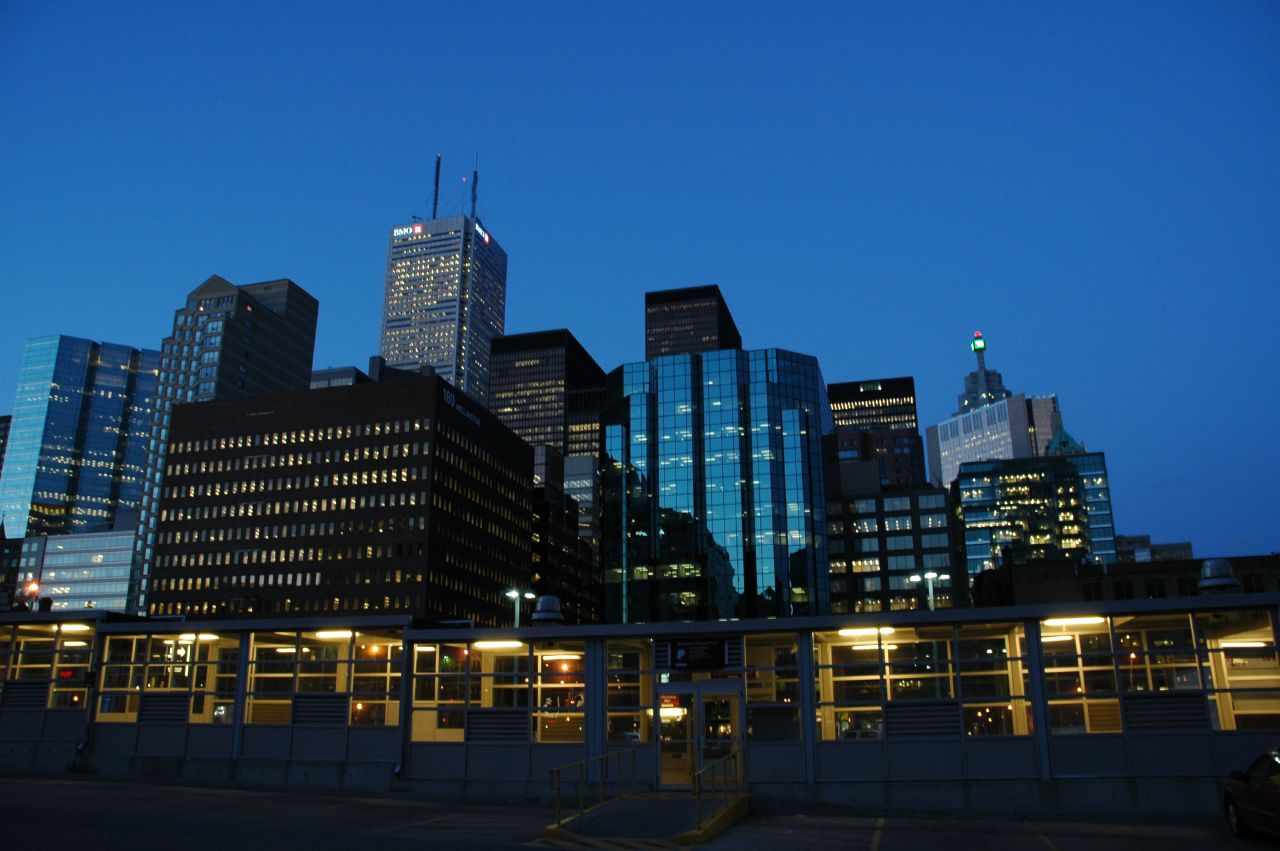
The skyline of Raccoon City as depicted in the film Resident Evil: Apocalypse.

==== Anderson films ====
Raccoon City is depicted in the Anderson films as a 21st-century cosmopolitan city with an infrastructure largely funded by the Umbrella Corporation. The first film features the Hive as a secret laboratory under the city. Housing more than 500 employees, the facility has an artificial intelligence, the Red Queen, controlling its security. The theft and deliberate release of the T-virus starts the chain of events depicted in the opening of the first film. Although the Hive is sealed off at the end of the film, it is reopened in the second film, Resident Evil: Apocalypse, by the Umbrella Corporation. Infected creatures spread out of the re-opened Hive into Raccoon City and Umbrella places the city under quarantine. In an attempt to stop the spread of the T-virus, Umbrella destroys Raccoon City with a nuclear missile near the end of the film. In the third film, it is revealed that this does not stop the virus from spreading; within five years the human race is on the verge of extinction, and the vast majority of the Earth is a barren wasteland crawling with zombies and mutated animals.

Instead of creating large sets for Raccoon City and the Hive, the film crew filmed on location at Toronto, Canada and Berlin, Germany. Due to the fictional city being located in the Midwestern United States, the film's director Paul Anderson chose Toronto to serve as the fictional city. In the third installment, Resident Evil: Extinction, there is a brief shot of Raccoon City: the camera zooms out from Raccoon City to a view of the Earth - in this shot, Raccoon City is depicted somewhere in either Illinois, Indiana, Michigan, or Ohio. The city was filmed untouched; many of its prominent features, such as its city hall and the CN Tower, are visible. For the underground train station in the Hive, Anderson chose to film in the Berlin U-Bahn. He said the atmosphere of the underground labyrinth structure was conducive to the acting and promoted a sense of realism and mood in the production. Extinction features another Hive in Death Valley, which is used for the research of a cure to the T-virus and of the Tyrant Program.

==== The Hive ====
The Hive is a fictional underground research facility located beneath Raccoon City and operated by the Umbrella Corporation. The Hive is the primary location for the development of the T-virus. In Resident Evil, the Hive is the location of the outbreak, contrary to the video game series where the outbreak began in the mansion facility. Prior to the destruction of Raccoon City and the virus outbreak, the Hive became defunct.

==== Welcome to Raccoon City ====
In the 2021 reboot Resident Evil: Welcome to Raccoon City, following the games' story more closely than the previous film series, Raccoon City appears as a setting, although it is at the same time as the events of Resident Evil, rather than two months after that, as in Resident Evil 2. Greater Sudbury, Ontario, Canada was used as the set for the film.

==== Resident Evil (2022 series) ====
In the 2022 Netflix series, set in its own universe featuring the games' storyline as its backstory and basis, New Raccoon City was constructed in South Africa following the destruction of the original Raccoon City. Like its namesake, it saw heavy investment from the Umbrella Corporation, which used it for drug and bioweapons research until the T-virus was leaked, turning the world into an apocalyptic landscape. An early version of the show's story indicated New Raccoon City was built directly on top of the ruins of its predecessor.

==== Resident Evil (2026 film) ====
In the 2026 reboot, Colorado is the setting for Raccoon City. Prague, Czech Republic was used as the set for the film.

=== In novels ===
In the novelizations by S.D. Perry, Raccoon City is depicted in Pennsylvania.

== Reception ==
Charlie Lopresto of IGN called the city an "iconic" location in zombie fiction, comparing it to "holy horror spaces like the Monroeville Mall and the Winchester pub". GamingBolt called the city "as important as the iconic characters that were a crucial part of the events that preceded its destruction." They also called the city undoubtedly the star of Resident Evil: Requiem. Virtual Cities: An Atlas & Exploration of Video Game Cities described the city in the original Resident Evil 2 feeling "as if it actually existed before the zombies", saying it's more than "a cardboard prop connecting indoor levels". Both the zombies and city roads were said to be "typical and representative enough to paint images of a wider town before the catastrophe".
