= Raccoon Police Station =

Fictional police station

- Resident Evil location
- The entrance of the police station, as seen in the remake of Resident Evil 2
- First appearance: Resident Evil 2 (1998)
- Last appearance: Resident Evil Requiem (2026)
- Genre: Survival horror

In-universe information
- Type: Police station
- Location: Raccoon City

The Raccoon Police Station is a fictional police station that appears in Capcom's Resident Evil survival horror franchise. The headquarters of the Raccoon Police Department (RPD), it is situated in the heart of Raccoon City. It serves as one of the primary settings for Resident Evil 2 and its remake, where it becomes overrun by deadly zombies and the living bioweapon Mr. X. It hides an entrance to the secret research facility of the evil Umbrella Corporation pharmaceutical company. It also appears in numerous subsequent games, including Resident Evil 3: Nemesis and its remake, Resident Evil: The Umbrella Chronicles, and Resident Evil: The Darkside Chronicles. The station was destroyed along the rest of the city by a missile strike sent by the U.S. government to clear the zombie outbreak during the events of Resident Evil 3: Nemesis and left in ruins since then, as seen in Resident Evil Requiem.

As a level, it has been praised by critics and fans for its unusual, artistic appearance, elaborate puzzles interwoven with the architecture, and intricate hub-based level design. The game's depiction of a highly-prepared police force falling victim to a zombie outbreak themselves plays a role in the implicit irony of the setting. Its redesign in the series' remakes was also praised for making the setting more detailed and atmospheric.

== Description ==
Formerly Raccoon City's prestigious art museum, the building was purchased in 1969 (prior to Resident Evil 2 remake, the late 80's) by the local government and converted for use by the RPD due to its ample parking space and centralized location near Raccoon City's central business district.

Although the artworks within the building were removed and relocated, it was once again decorated by Raccoon City's Chief of Police, Brian Irons, a known art and sculpture enthusiast. Irons' proclivity to constantly purchase ever more grandiose pieces leads to many of the building's storage rooms being filled with neglected artworks he no longer appreciates. The building contains two entrances to the city's sewer system; one through the kennels, and one through a secret room connected to Chief Irons' office. The latter was designed and installed by the Umbrella Corporation to better facilitate Irons' duties within their clandestine research operations, as these sewer entrances allowed access to their secret underground laboratories. In the remake, however, the underground lab is accessed through a secret tunnel and office hidden by a large moving statue in the main hall of the RPD, which in the original game would only give you a key to some of the rooms in the station.

== Appearances ==
=== In video games ===
During the September 1998 Raccoon City T-Virus outbreak, many of the series' central characters seek refuge within the precinct, including Leon S. Kennedy and Claire Redfield. One day before them, S.T.A.R.S. Alpha Team operatives Brad Vickers and Jill Valentine hole up in the precinct while being pursued by one of Umbrella's deadly Bio-Organic Weapons, Nemesis, with Vickers being brutally killed by the creature at the precinct entrance.

The station is temporarily used as a rallying point and temporary shelter for surviving citizens during the incident, including the survivors of Resident Evil Outbreak: File 2. The "Desperate Times" scenario details the escape of a handful of officers and survivors the day before the arrival of Jill Valentine and Brad Vickers.

Eventually the building suffers the same fate as the rest of Raccoon City, when it is annihilated by the United States government to prevent the spread of the T-Virus during the events of Resident Evil 3: Nemesis (1999).

In Resident Evil Requiem, set 28 years after Raccoon City's destruction, Leon returns to the ruined city in pursuit of former Umbrella scientist Victor Gideon, briefly passing through the police station to reach a secret Umbrella facility beneath the city known as the ARK.

A replica of the station is featured in Umbrella Corps.

Outside of the Resident Evil series, the Raccoon Police Station was added to the survival horror game Dead by Daylight as one of its playable maps in 2021. The east wing and west wing of the station appear as separate map variants.

=== In other media ===
The Raccoon Police Station was featured in a live action Japanese commercial of Resident Evil 2 (Biohazard 2 in Japan) directed by George A. Romero in 1998. The commercial was filmed on location at Lincoln Heights Jail in Los Angeles, California.

The police station first appeared on film in Resident Evil: Apocalypse (2004). During the viral outbreak in Raccoon City, a large number of infections occurred in the station, as violent, infected people were arrested and brought to the department, where they attacked officers and other prisoners. By the time the city was sealed, the R.P.D.'s headquarters building was abandoned.

The station appears again in Resident Evil: Welcome to Raccoon City (2021), where the protagonists seek weapons, and are subsequently forced to escape after it is overrun by zombies.

== Development ==
The Raccoon Police Station was initially conceived by a team led by Hideki Kamiya as a traditional station based largely on the 1976 John Carpenter film Assault on Precinct 13. However, producer Shinji Mikami believed it was too sterile and boring, and did not sufficiently resemble the complex design of Spencer Mansion from the first game. Accompanying a delay and drastic revision of the game, with the original being referred to as Resident Evil 1.5, Mikami insisted the station's design be changed to that of a historic art museum that resembled a haunted mansion.

The creation of the Police Station was based on the Osaka City Central Public Hall. It was designed in the Gothic revival style, often used in religious buildings, giving it a church-like appearance. Its idiosyncratic design is representative of America as seen through a Japanese lens, including the main hall's giant goddess statue. The original main hall of the station is a flat, pre-rendered image, while the one for Resident Evil 2 remake is fully rendered in 3D. Its lighting was drastically changed for the remake, from having brightly-lit interiors to dark and often flooded or blood-filled rooms, making it significantly more scary to explore. The remake retains the station's late 1990s setting, with period-accurate computers, although often other technology from later time periods is used, such as laptops seeming to use wireless streaming for their security footage. It has become a popular meme in Resident Evil 2's remake to question the use of a USB dongle in the police station's S.T.A.R.S. office since the game takes place in 1998. The technology wasn't readily available at that level in the real world until at least a year later.

== Reception ==
In a PC Gamer feature, journalist Andy Kelly described the station as a "great setting" for multiple reasons, citing its construction around a central hub, helping the player to create a mental map of its layout. Describing the remake's incarnation, he called the lighting "moody" and "atmospheric", and the architecture "gorgeous", citing the nostalgia elicited from its appearance. He also mentioned the level's subversion of expectations, such as zombies impinging upon the main hall in the B scenario, and Mr. X's presence.

Ed Smith of Kill Screen called the station a "fascinating" example of how the game meshes comprehensible mechanisms and architecture with "videogame conceits". Describing the building's design as "strange and abstract", he noted that it combines the "credible and conceptual". Calling the main hall "far too big", he stated that it left the player feeling "vulnerable, exposed, and daunted", describing it as an unexpected rug-pull after fighting through the zombie outbreak outside.

Edwin Evans-Thirlwell of Eurogamer called the station's artwork "eerie", calling it "extravagantly remodeled" in the Resident Evil 2 remake. Describing its lobby as "absurdly overwrought", he remarked that the level's numerous appearances evoked the unheimlich concept, and were uncanny because they were so familiar. He stated that the building's decorations had psychological resonance, as they mirrored the mind of Chief Irons.

Rosh Kelly of PCGamesN called the police station one of the most memorable aspects of Resident Evil 2, describing it as a "claustrophobic gothic building". He cited an actual police officer's testimonial that it was unlike the majority of police stations, but that rural police buildings, which were often converted houses, could have many winding passages, although the aspect of requiring security keycards was seen as accurate. Virtual Cities: An Atlas & Exploration of Video Game Cities describes the police station as "extravagant", "massive" and "iconically odd", characterizing it as "an intriguingly skewed vision of American midwestern urbanism", albeit crafted by Japanese game developers during the 90s who were influenced by 1970s and 80s zombie films.
