= Resident Evil (2002 film) =

Film by Paul W. S. Anderson

- Theatrical release poster
- Directed by: Paul W. S. Anderson
- Written by: Paul W. S. Anderson
- Based on: Resident Evil by Capcom
- Produced by: Bernd Eichinger; Samuel Hadida; Jeremy Bolt; Paul W. S. Anderson
- Starring: Milla Jovovich; Michelle Rodriguez; Eric Mabius; James Purefoy; Martin Crewes; Colin Salmon
- Cinematography: David Johnson
- Edited by: Alexander Berner
- Music by: Marco Beltrami; Marilyn Manson
- Production companies: Constantin Film; New Legacy Film; Davis Films
- Distributed by: Constantin Film Verleih (Germany); Pathé Distribution FilmFour (United Kingdom and Ireland); Metropolitan Filmexport (France); Screen Gems (through Sony Pictures Releasing, United States and selected territories)
- Release dates: March 15, 2002 (United States); March 21, 2002 (Germany); July 12, 2002 (United Kingdom)
- Running time: 100 minutes
- Countries: Germany; United Kingdom; United States; France
- Language: English
- Budget: $33 million
- Box office: $103 million

Resident Evil is a 2002 action horror film written and directed by Paul W. S. Anderson. The film stars Milla Jovovich, Michelle Rodriguez, Eric Mabius, James Purefoy, Martin Crewes, and Colin Salmon. It is the first installment in the Resident Evil film series, which is loosely based on the video game series of the same name. Borrowing elements from the video games Resident Evil and Resident Evil 2, the film follows amnesiac heroine Alice and a band of Umbrella Corporation commandos as they attempt to contain the outbreak of the T-virus at a secret underground facility.

German studio Constantin Film bought the rights to adapt the series in live-action in January 1997. Several writers and filmmakers, such as Alan B. McElroy, George A. Romero and Jamie Blanks, were initially hired to direct and write the film, but their scripts were rejected. In 2000, Anderson was announced as writer and director. Developed as a prequel set in the same continuity as the video game series, the film was initially titled Resident Evil: Ground Zero, but was retitled after the September 11 attacks. Cast was announced in early 2001 and principal photography commenced in March 2001 in Berlin.

Resident Evil was theatrically released in Germany on March 12, 2002, by Constantin Film Verleih, and in the United Kingdom on July 12, 2002, by Pathé Distribution. The film received generally negative reviews from critics but grossed $103 million worldwide against a production budget of $33 million. It was followed by five sequels establishing their own continuity: Apocalypse (2004), Extinction (2007), Afterlife (2010), Retribution (2012), and The Final Chapter (2016).

== Plot ==
Underneath Raccoon City, a genetic research facility called the Hive is owned by the Umbrella Corporation. A thief steals the genetically engineered T-virus and contaminates the Hive with it. In response, the facility's artificial intelligence, the Red Queen, seals the Hive and kills everyone inside to prevent the virus from leaking into the outside world.

Alice wakes up in the bathroom of a deserted mansion, suffering amnesia. An unknown person tackles her as a group of commandos led by James "One" Shade breaks in. Alice's attacker claims to be Matt Addison, who just transferred as a cop in Raccoon P.D. Alice and Matt are ordered to go down to the Hive with the group, where they find another amnesiac, Spence, hidden in their train. The commandos explain that everyone in the group except Matt is an employee of the Umbrella Corporation, and Alice and her partner Spence were assigned to guard the Hive's secret entrance beneath the mansion under the pretense of being married.

A laser defense system kills One and three more commandos outside the Red Queen's chamber. Despite the Red Queen's pleas for the group to leave, Kaplan disables it, causing the power to fail and all of the doors in the Hive to open. This releases the zombified staff and containment units holding Lickers, creatures created through experimentation with the T-virus. The horde attacks the group, and J.D. dies while the rest are separated. During that moment, Rain loses her keys and Matt, taking advantage of the chaos, sweeps the keys to escape his handcuffs. Alice starts regaining her memories while Matt finds his sister Lisa, who is one of the zombies.

Alice saves him, and Matt explains that he and Lisa were environmental activists and that Lisa infiltrated Umbrella to smuggle out the evidence of illegal experiments and shut Umbrella down. Alice remembers that she was Lisa's contact in the Hive but does not tell Matt. The survivors reunite at the Red Queen's chamber, where the commandos explain they have one hour before the Hive traps them inside automatically. Alice and Kaplan activate the Red Queen to find an exit; they rig a remote shutdown to ensure her cooperation.

As they escape through maintenance tunnels, zombies ambush them, and a reanimated J.D. bites Rain before she shoots him dead. They reach safety except Kaplan, who is bitten and separated from the group. Alice remembers that an anti-virus is in the lab, but they find it missing. Spence's memory returns, revealing he was the thief who stole and purposefully released the T-virus in the beginning; he hid both the T-virus and anti-virus on the train.

Spence turns against the others but is bitten by a zombie before trapping the survivors in the lab. Spence retrieves the anti-virus but is killed by a Licker. The Red Queen offers to spare Alice and Matt if they kill Rain, who has been infected. A power outage occurs. Kaplan appears, having shut down the Red Queen to open the lab doors. The group heads to the train, where Alice retrieves the anti-virus and kills a reanimated Spence.

On the train, they inject Rain and Kaplan with the anti-virus. The Licker attacks them, clawing Matt and killing Kaplan. Alice subdues the Licker before a zombified Rain attacks Matt, the anti-virus having failed to cure her. He shoots Rain dead. At the mansion, Matt's wound begins mutating. Before Alice can give him the anti-virus, a group of Umbrella scientists seizes them. They reveal Matt is to be put into the Nemesis Program, and the Hive is to be re-opened for an investigation into the incident.

Sometime later, Alice wakes up at the Raccoon City Hospital strapped to an examination table. She escapes outside, only to find Raccoon City in ruins. She retrieves a shotgun from an abandoned police car for defense. (Note: as depicted in Resident Evil: Apocalypse.)

== Cast ==
- Milla Jovovich as Alice
- Michelle Rodriguez as Rain
- Eric Mabius as Matt
- James Purefoy as Spence
- Martin Crewes as Kaplan
- Colin Salmon as One
- Indra Ové as Ms. Black
- Joseph May as Dr. Blue
- Heike Makatsch as Lisa
- Stephen Billington as Mr. White
- Fiona Glascott as Ms. Gold
- Pasquale Aleardi as J.D.
- Liz May Brice as a medic
- Jason Isaacs as unnamed doctor and narrator
- Michaela Dicker as Red Queen

== Production ==
=== Development ===
German production company Constantin Film bought the live-action film rights for Resident Evil in January 1997, and hired screenwriter Alan B. McElroy to write the script. At the time, McElroy was also writing the film adaptation for another video game, Doom, which ultimately wasn't used. The June 1998 issue of PlayStation Magazine published an article about McElroy's Resident Evil script. Described as action- and horror-packed and very violent, the script was similar to the original game. Some changes were made; for example, there was no mention of the Umbrella Corporation or STARS. Instead, the plot followed a special forces team sent by the government to rescue scientists from the mansion laboratory after the SWAT team sent in earlier was killed, during which they realize the mission was a trap and that they are specimens in a medical experiment. The script included all major characters and monsters from the game. McElroy's script was rejected.

In 1998, George A. Romero directed a television commercial for the video game Resident Evil 2. The original game's director, Shinji Mikami, is a fan of Romero and had been influenced by his films. The commercial was only shown in Japan, but impressed Sony enough for them to ask him to write and direct Resident Evil. Romero stated that he had his secretary play the entire game through and record the gameplay so he could study it as a resource. Romero's screenplay was based on the first Resident Evil game and included characters from the video games. Chris Redfield and Jill Valentine were the lead characters, involved in a romantic relationship. Barry Burton, Rebecca Chambers, Ada Wong, and Albert Wesker were to also appear. The ending to the film would have been similar to the first Resident Evil game. Romero also hired artist Bernie Wrightson to design some concept artwork of creatures for the film, and Wrightson did several designs of Tyrant, based on its look in the original game and its description in Romero's script. In a 2002 interview in Fangoria, Romero said that he wrote a total of five or six different drafts, but that they were rejected. Robert Kulzer, head of the production, said that, although he felt Romero's script was good, the film would have received an NC-17 rating if it had been approved. He also said that the producers thought that McElroy did well with his script, but that they rejected it because, by the time it was finished, the second game would have been released and they felt a film based on the first game would appear dated. Romero said a number of people from Capcom and Constantin supported his script, but Constantin head Bernd Eichinger ultimately rejected it. In 2019, the University of Pittsburgh's Library System acquired the "George A. Romero Archival Collection", which included material involving his work on Resident Evil. These include several more copies of Romero's Resident Evil script, and a first draft of McElroy's script, dated May 29, 1997, all of which are available to read at the university. A documentary based on this adaptation was released on digital on January 7, 2025.

In 2000, director Jamie Blanks was attached to a new adaptation that was said to borrow more elements from the Resident Evil 2 and Resident Evil 3: Nemesis games.

In 1995, Paul W. S. Anderson's film Mortal Kombat became one of the first commercially successful video game adaptations. After playing Resident Evil, Anderson saw its cinematic potential and wrote a script titled Undead, which he described as "a ripoff" of the game. Bernd Eichinger, head of Constantin Film, was enthusiastic, so Anderson developed it into the script for Resident Evil. In late 2000, Anderson was announced as director and writer, and Resident Evil re-entered pre-production stages. Anderson stated the film would not include the same characters from the video game series because "The suspense dynamic of who is going to live, who is going to die and what people's allegiances are, was only going to work with new characters.”

=== Casting ===
In early 2001, Michelle Rodriguez, James Purefoy and Milla Jovovich were the first of the cast to be signed on the project. David Boreanaz was intended to portray the male cop lead of Matt Addison, but he turned down the role to continue work on the WB series Angel. Boreanaz suggested that he was in negotiations to have a smaller role in the film, but he later declined the role. The role of Matt Addison then went to Eric Mabius who was cast in March 2001, along with Heike Makatsch, who was cast as Matt Addison's sister Lisa Addison, an employee working for Umbrella's Hive facility. Jovovich's martial arts training for her role was initiated by actor-martial artist Robin Shou.

=== Filming and story development ===
In early March 2001, half of the film was to be shot in Adlershof Studios in Berlin and its surroundings. Principal photography began on March 5, 2001, at numerous locations including the then-unfinished station U-Bahnhof Bundestag of the Berlin U-Bahn, Landsberger Allee, Kaserne Krampnitz and the Schloss Lindstedt.

The film was originally subtitled as Resident Evil: Ground Zero when it was considered a prequel to the games, but the subtitle was removed following 9/11. The film's synopsis as of March 16, 2001 revealed that Jovovich's Alice and Rodriguez's Rain were the leaders of a commando team sent in to prevent a viral outbreak from spreading to the rest of the world. The character of the Red Queen was added into the film's story as an homage to Lewis Carroll's Alice in Wonderland.

During production, professional dancers were hired to star as zombies as they had better control of their body movements. While computer effects were used on some zombies, much of the undead appearances were accomplished through make-up while their movements were a more laissez-faire approach, as Anderson told the actors to move however they thought a zombie would, given their conditions. Whilst filming, there was a shortage of manpower where the available dancers were not enough to represent the required numbers of undead, but some of Capcom's executives and several of the film producers including Jeremy Bolt agreed to make appearances. The film's stunt coordinator also made an appearance as the dog trainer while Bolt's girlfriend and sister both appeared as zombies.

The film's score and soundtrack were composed by Marco Beltrami and Marilyn Manson during mid-2001. Manson described the score and soundtrack as being more "electronic" than his previous work.

== Relationship to the games ==
Elements are borrowed from Resident Evil 2 and Resident Evil 3: Nemesis, including Alice's character awakening in Raccoon City Hospital with a viral outbreak occurring in the city. There are several references to characters and organizations such as the Umbrella Corporation, the Nemesis program, the underground train bearing the moniker "Alexi-5000" (a double callback to a similar train in Resident Evil 2 and Code: Veronica's villain Alexia Ashford), and a police cruiser, from which Alice takes out a shotgun, with a "STARS" logo on the hood. Jason Isaacs appears uncredited in the film as an unnamed masked doctor, a reference to William Birkin. The character of Dr. Isaacs (played by Iain Glen) in the later films is named after him.

Other references include Alice examining the mansion outside, where crows are visible; crows are minor enemies throughout the games. Alice finds a picture of her wedding day with Spence, which is in the same style as the photos in the first version of the Resident Evil game: black-and-white with the foreground image noticeably spliced into the background. In the newspaper at the end of the film, the words "Horror in Raccoon City! More Victims Dead!" are shown in the upper right corner. This is a reference to the same newspaper in the censored opening of the first Resident Evil game and the prologue chapter for the Resident Evil: The Umbrella Conspiracy novel. Near the beginning of the film, Alice examines a statue after the wind blows its cover off. This statue is similar in design to one in the mansion of the first game.

While returning to the Red Queen's chamber, Kaplan points out that the four bodies of the group's dead crew from the Glass Hallway Trap sequence are gone. This is a reference to the games, where the bodies of enemies disappear. When the survivors make their escape from the Hive with a countdown as they fight the Licker, this is a reference to the Resident Evil game which ends with a five-minute countdown, during which the boss must be defeated.

Anderson has stated that the film's camera angles and several shots allude to the video game's camera angles, such as the fight between Alice and the security guard. These include a scene near the beginning where there is a close up of Alice's eye, a direct reference to the title screen of the first game. In another scene, Alice awakes and hears a creepy sound, which is a reference to the plot of the first game.

== Release ==
=== Marketing ===
In March 2001, the official website was set up, which revealed the film's original October 26, 2001 release and a redirect to the film's production company Constantin Film. The website was fully opened in July 2001, and composed of images, plot info, character biographies and downloads. In January 2002, the film was officially announced to have an R rating, although Anderson decided not to make it as gory as the games. Originally it received an NC-17 rating and Anderson had to make cuts; the uncut version was teased but never released.

In December 2001, Sony gave fans a chance to design the film's poster with a prize of an undisclosed amount of cash and free screening of the film, with the final design being the film's poster. On February 16, 2002, Nick Des Barres, a 23-year-old aspiring actor and ex-video game magazine designer, was announced as the winner of the competition. The film's trailer and clips were released in late January and early February 2002. Resident Evil was released on March 15, 2002, in the US.

On June 29, 2004, over two years after the film's release, a novelization by Keith R. A. DeCandido was published.

=== Distribution ===
In May 2001, it was announced that the Columbia TriStar Motion Picture Group was in final negotiations to acquire North American rights to the film. It was suggested by Capcom executives that the film would not be released in 2001, but rather in 2002, which was later confirmed by Sony in August 2001. The film was set for release on April 5, 2002, before being pushed forward to a March 15 release.

In December 2001, it was announced that Pathé and FilmFour had acquired the British theatrical distribution rights to the movie as part of a partnership between the two companies. They would both share acquisition and distribution costs and divide profits equally, while Pathé's UK distribution arm would handle distribution.

=== Home media ===
Resident Evil: Special Edition was released on VHS and DVD by Columbia TriStar Home Entertainment on July 30, 2002, in the United States, April 14, 2003 by 20th Century Fox Home Entertainment in the United Kingdom and October 2002 by Buena Vista Home Entertainment in Australia. It was a special edition release, with a number of documentaries including five featurettes, one of which explained the making of Resident Evil, the film's score composition, costume design, set design, zombie make up tests, the music video for a remixed version of "My Plague" by Slipknot, and filmographies.

A Deluxe Edition was released on September 7, 2004, which included new special features such as an alternate ending with director Anderson's video introduction, a clip compilation for Apocalypse, From Game to Screen featurette, a storyboarding Resident Evil featurette, and 6 other exclusive featurettes: The Creature, The Elevator, The Train, The Laser, Zombie Dogs and Zombies.

Screen Gems released Resident Evil: Resurrected Edition, a 2-disc package containing Resident Evil and Resident Evil: Apocalypse, on September 4, 2007.

On January 1, 2008, a Blu-ray of the Resident Evil trilogy was released. The film was also released on Ultra HD Blu-ray along with the five sequels on November 17, 2020.

=== Television ===
In the United Kingdom, it was watched by 2.8 million viewers on television during the first half of 2005, making it the eighth most-watched UK film on television during that period.

== Reception ==
=== Box office ===
The film opened in 2,528 theaters and grossed $17,707,106 on its opening weekend (March 15–17, 2002), ranking in second place behind Ice Age. The film grossed $40,119,709 domestically and $103,787,401 worldwide.

=== Critical response ===
On Rotten Tomatoes the film has a score of 36% based on reviews from 162 critics and an average rating of 4.6/10. The consensus reads, "Like other video game adaptations, Resident Evil is loud, violent, formulaic, and cheesy." On Metacritic, the film has an average score of 35 out of 100 based on 24 critics, indicating "generally unfavorable reviews". Audiences polled by CinemaScore gave the film an average grade of "B" on an A+ to F scale.

Robert K. Elder from the Chicago Tribune thought the film "updates the zombie genre with an anti-corporate message while still scaring its audience and providing heart-pounding action". Owen Gleiberman from Entertainment Weekly noted: the film is as "impersonal in its relentlessness as the video-game series that inspired it".

Resident Evil and its sequel appeared on Roger Ebert's most hated films list, published in 2005. In his review, Ebert described it as a zombie movie set in the 21st century, where "large metallic objects make crashing noises just by being looked at", and criticized the dialogue for being a series of commands and explanations with no "small talk".

==== Subsequent Reappraisal ====
In 2014, filmmaker James Cameron named Resident Evil his biggest guilty pleasure. Rotten Tomatoes lists the film on its 100 Best Zombie Movies, Ranked by Tomatometer. A 2026 Salon commentary noted that the Resident Evil films created by Paul W.S. Anderson "are so remarkably stylized, so absurdly over-the-top, so referential and deferent to Anderson’s own inspirations, that they’ve become singular visions." A GameSpot retrospective echoed similar sentiments, stating, "Were they faithful to the games? Not in the slightest. Were they kickass Y2K/nu-metal-drenched action films inspired by Hong Kong actioners? You bet, and I’m tired of acting like these movies aren’t enjoyable." In 2022, Vogue highlighted the film's costume design, calling it the "most stylish zombie movie ever made."

=== Accolades ===
Year	Award	Category	Recipient(s)	Result	Ref.
2002	Golden Schmoes Awards	Most Underrated Movie of the Year	Resident Evil	Nominated	
2002	Golden Schmoes Awards	Best Horror Movie of the Year	Resident Evil	Nominated	
2002	Golden Schmoes Awards	Best T&A of the Year	Milla Jovovich	Nominated	
2003	29th Saturn Awards	Best Horror Film	Resident Evil	Nominated	
2003	29th Saturn Awards	Best Actress	Milla Jovovich	Nominated	
2003	German Camera Awards	Outstanding Editing in a Feature Film	Alexander Berner	Nominated	
2004	Golden Trailer Awards	Most Original	Ignition Creative	Nominated	

== Sequels ==
After commercial success at the box office, a sequel, Resident Evil: Apocalypse (2004) was released. It was followed by Resident Evil: Extinction (2007), Resident Evil: Afterlife (2010), Resident Evil: Retribution (2012) and Resident Evil: The Final Chapter (2016). Anderson did not direct the second or third films due to filming commitments with Alien vs. Predator (2004) and Death Race (2008).

== See also ==
- List of films based on video games
