= Resident Evil: Extinction =

2007 film by Russell Mulcahy

- Theatrical release poster
- Directed by: Russell Mulcahy
- Written by: Paul W. S. Anderson
- Based on: Resident Evil by Capcom
- Produced by: Bernd Eichinger; Samuel Hadida; Robert Kulzer; Jeremy Bolt; Paul W. S. Anderson
- Starring: Milla Jovovich; Oded Fehr; Ali Larter; Iain Glen; Ashanti; Mike Epps; Christopher Egan; Spencer Locke; Jason O'Mara
- Cinematography: David Johnson
- Edited by: Niven Howie
- Music by: Charlie Clouser
- Production companies: Screen Gems; Constantin Film; Davis Films; Impact Pictures
- Distributed by: Sony Pictures Releasing (Select territories); Constantin Film (Germany); Metropolitan Filmexport (France)
- Release dates: September 20, 2007 (Russia); September 21, 2007 (United States); October 12, 2007 (United Kingdom)
- Running time: 94 minutes
- Countries: Germany; Canada; France; United Kingdom; United States
- Language: English
- Budget: $45 million
- Box office: $147.7 million

Resident Evil: Extinction is a 2007 action horror film directed by Russell Mulcahy and written by Paul W. S. Anderson. A direct sequel to Resident Evil: Apocalypse (2004), it is the third installment in the Resident Evil film series, which is loosely based on the Capcom survival horror video game series of the same name. The film follows the heroine Alice (Milla Jovovich), along with a group of survivors from Raccoon City, as they attempt to travel across the Mojave desert wilderness to Alaska and escape a zombie apocalypse.

In November 2005, Screen Gems gained the rights for the third installment in the franchise, which was then subtitled Extinction. Anderson returned as a writer, and filming took place in Mexico with Mulcahy as the director.

Resident Evil: Extinction was released in the United States on September 21, 2007, and was released in the United Kingdom on October 12, 2007, by Sony Pictures Releasing. The DVD and Blu-ray versions were released in North America on January 1, 2008. Like its predecessors, the film received generally negative reviews from critics but was a box office success, grossing $147.7 million worldwide against a $45 million budget. A fourth film, Resident Evil: Afterlife, was released in 2010.

== Plot ==
A cloned Alice wakes up in a mansion, wanders through its halls, and is forced to escape several security traps. However, she is eventually killed by a bounding mine hidden in the floor. Her body is dumped into a pit filled with dozens of other Alice clones, representing the failed results of the Umbrella Corporation's ongoing Project Alice.

Five years after Umbrella's attempts to cover up the contamination of Raccoon City, (Note: as depicted in Resident Evil: Apocalypse.) the T-virus has spread around the world, causing ecological destruction to all life. The real Alice wanders the wasteland and, after fighting off marauders, discovers information in an abandoned notebook referring to a supposedly uninfected area in Alaska.

Simultaneously, a convoy of survivors led by Claire Redfield and Raccoon City survivors Carlos Oliveira and L.J. Wade travels across the country in search of supplies and safe harbor. While searching a motel, L.J. is bitten by a zombie. Fearing the harsh fate that awaits him, he chooses not to tell the other survivors about the injury. The next morning, the convoy is attacked by a murderous flock of infected crows. With the team nearly overwhelmed, Alice appears and destroys the remaining crows with her newfound telekinesis, though she falls unconscious. Awaking shortly thereafter, Alice is introduced to Claire and tells her about the notebook, convincing her to take the convoy to Alaska.

Dr. Isaacs' attempts to domesticate the infected lead to creating a new zombie breed. Albert Wesker's security officer, Captain Alexander Slater, reports on Isaacs' disregard for Umbrella regulations. Wesker tasks Slater with watching Isaacs, telling him to kill the scientist if he disobeys orders again. Tracing an energy pattern sent out by Alice's telekinesis, Umbrella triangulates her location. Desperate to reclaim Alice to achieve his goals, Dr. Isaacs sends his new zombies to ambush the convoy against Wesker's specific orders. During the attack, most of the convoy is killed, and L.J. succumbs to his infection, biting Carlos before he kills him. Umbrella tries to shut Alice down remotely, but she breaks free from Umbrella's programming and continues to fight. She finds Isaacs at the scene, and he is bitten as he flees via helicopter. Alice and a girl from Claire's convoy named K-mart use Isaacs' computer to track the helicopter's flight path, leading them to Umbrella's underground facility.

As the convoy arrives at the Umbrella Facility, Carlos, dying from his bite, sets out to sacrifice himself, giving some goodbyes to the convoy, including Alice. Carlos takes a tanker truck with dynamite to destroy the zombie horde blocking the entrance to the Umbrella Facility. The dynamite explodes, killing him. Alice and Claire get everyone else onto a helicopter to get them to safety, but Alice stays behind.

Entering the underground facility, Alice meets a holograph of the Red Queen's "sister" AI, the White Queen. She informs Alice that her blood can cure the T-virus, defends the Red Queen's prior actions, and reveals what happened to Dr. Isaacs. On her way to the lab's lower levels, Alice encounters one of her clones, which awakens but appears to die from shock soon after. Alice discovers Isaacs, now having mutated into a Tyrant, defeating him after leading him to the replica of The Hive's laser corridor featured in the film's opening. Just as Alice is about to meet the same fate, the system is deactivated by the clone, who is still alive.

Later in Tokyo, Wesker informs his fellow Umbrella executives that the North American facility has been lost. Alice appears during the meeting, declaring that she and her other clones are coming for him.

== Cast ==
- Milla Jovovich as Alice, an ex-security officer of Umbrella that has turned against them
- Ali Larter as Claire Redfield, a woman transporting a convoy of survivors in Nevada alongside Carlos
- Oded Fehr as Carlos Oliveira, a former U.B.C.S. mercenary who has also turned rogue
- Iain Glen as Dr. Isaacs, the head scientist of Umbrella's North American facility
- Ashanti as Nurse Betty, a tough young woman who is a nurse in Claire's convoy
- Mike Epps as L.J., a former citizen of Raccoon City now part of Claire's convoy
- Spencer Locke as K-Mart, a teenage girl who was found by Claire's companions hiding out in a K-Mart store prior to the outbreak
- Jason O'Mara as Albert Wesker, the Chairman of Umbrella
- Christopher Egan as Mikey, a young computer junkie who drives the "computer station" portion of the convoy
- Madeline Carroll as White Queen, the sister computer of the original Red Queen
- Matthew Marsden as Slater, part of Wesker's crew
- Linden Ashby as Chase, a cowboy and ex-cop survivor
- Joe Hursley as Otto, a survivor who drives a school bus as part of the convoy

== Production ==
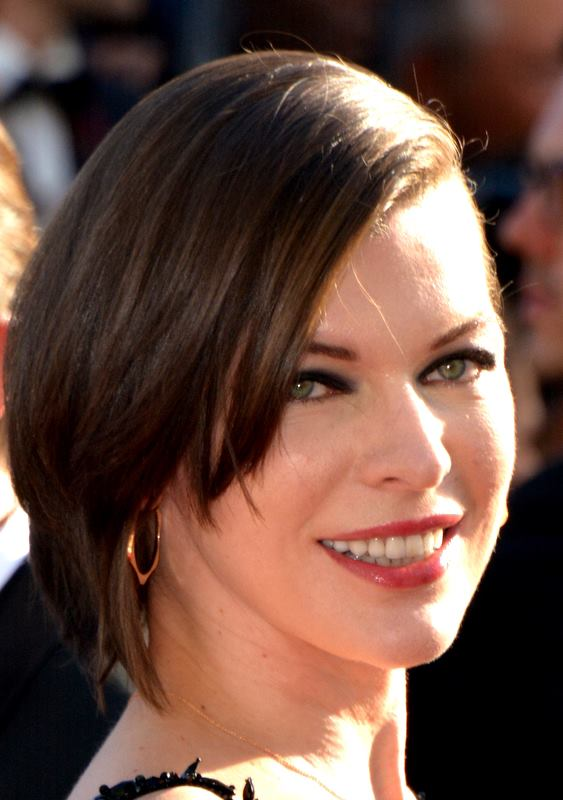
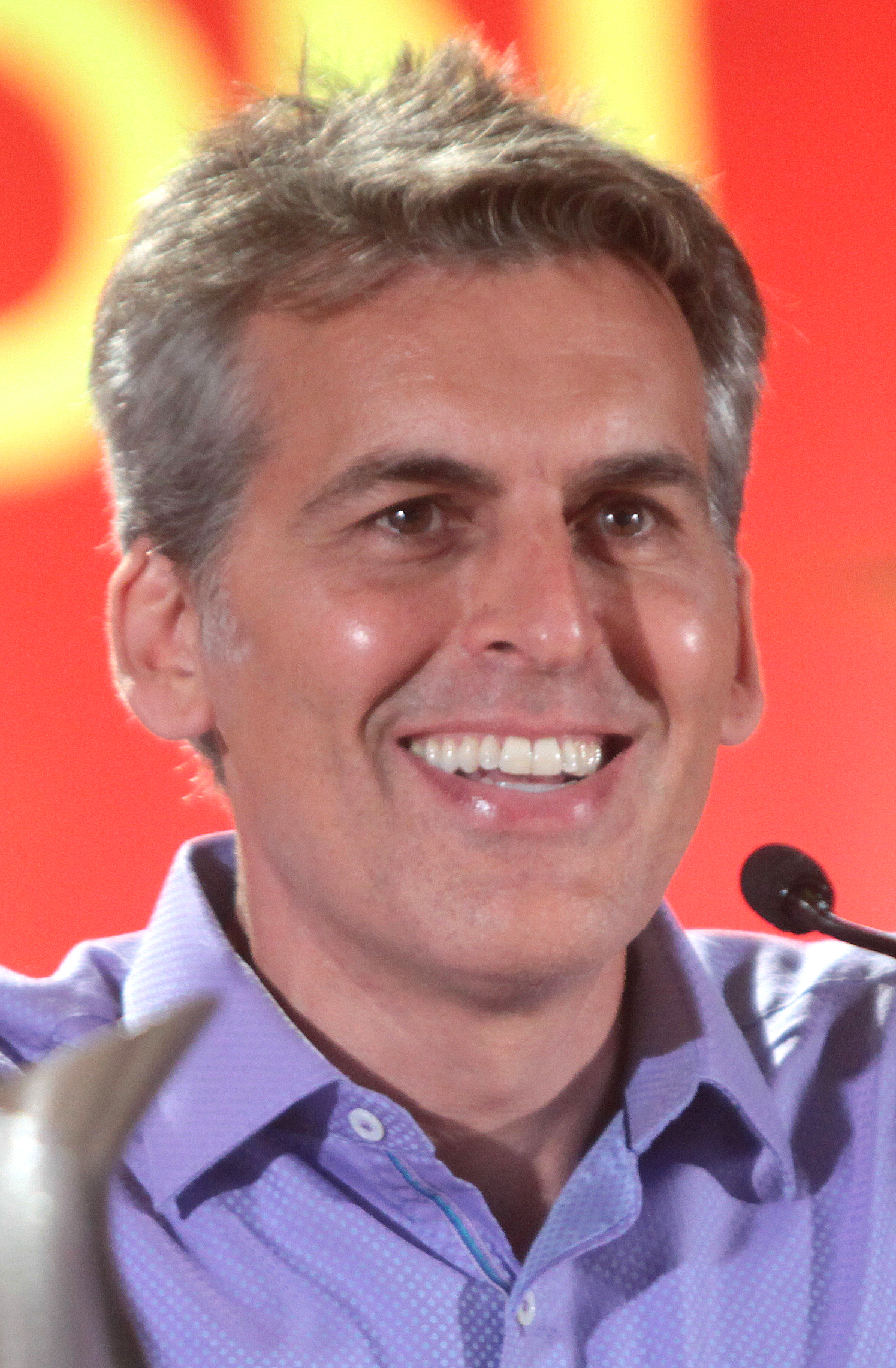
Top to bottom: Milla Jovovich and Oded Fehr reprised their roles from Resident Evil: Apocalypse, as Alice and Carlos Oliveira, respectively.

=== Pre-production ===
Resident Evil: Extinction was first discussed by Resident Evil franchise writer Paul W. S. Anderson after Resident Evil: Apocalypse opened at number one at the US box office in 2004, earning more than $23.7 million dollars on its opening weekend. Anderson told SciFi Wire that he would like to oversee a third installment, under the original title of Resident Evil: Afterlife. Shortly after, the film and another planned sequel were officially announced by Sony Screen Gems on June 13, 2005.

On November 7, 2005, Screen Gems acquired multiple distribution rights including North America, with the film's title being changed from Resident Evil: Afterlife to Resident Evil: Extinction. Impressed with Russell Mulcahy's work on Highlander, Highlander II: The Quickening, The Shadow and Ricochet, Anderson signed Mulcahy on as director, stating: "Russell pioneered a very distinct visual style, a lot of moving camera and crane work, lots of very fast cutting. He's got a very cool eye and sees great ways to shoot. His work certainly had a big influence on me as a filmmaker and that's why I was very excited to work with him on this movie."

=== Casting ===
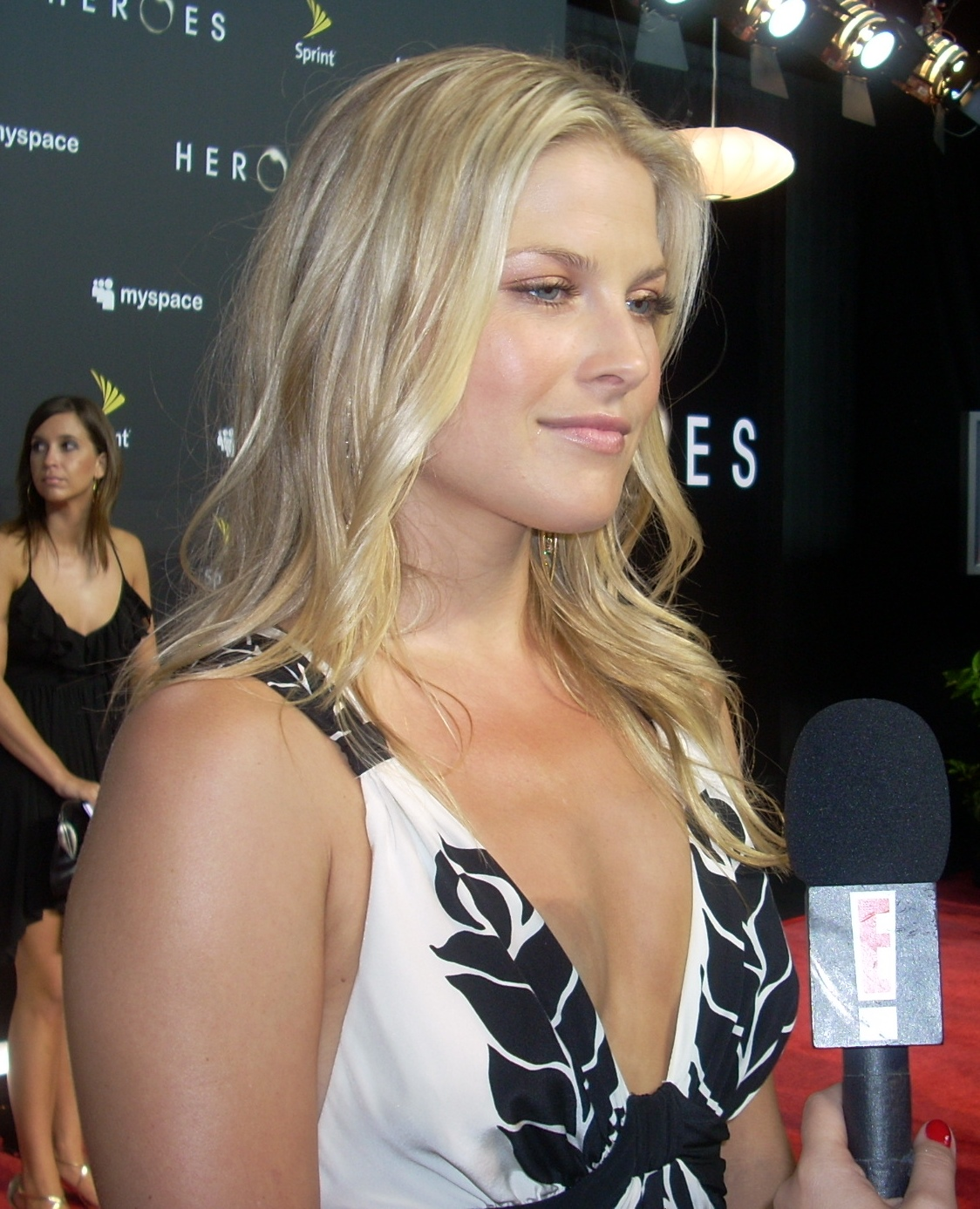
Ali Larter portrayed Claire Redfield, a character that originated from the video game series.

On June 12, 2005, Milla Jovovich was announced to reprise her role as the heroine Alice. In an interview with BlackFilm.com on September 9, 2005, Mike Epps confirmed that he would be reprising his role from Resident Evil: Apocalypse as L.J. Wade, noting that: "Black people die in these movies and [Anderson] was like, 'Well Mike, I kinda like you.' So then I asked him, 'Are you setting me up to die because if there's a fourth movie, I'm as good as dead.'" Sienna Guillory was planned to reprise her role as Jill Valentine; however, she passed on the role, citing commitments to Eragon. On May 9, 2006, Oded Fehr was confirmed to reprise his role of Carlos Oliveira, as well as Iain Glen, Spencer Locke and Ashanti Douglas who were added to the cast. It was rumored that Debra Marshall was originally cast as Cindy Lennox. However, it was proven to be only a rumor. Chris Redfield was rumored to appear in the film portrayed by Australian actor Charlie Clausen, and Leon S. Kennedy was also rumored to be played by Jensen Ackles.

=== Story development ===
The film's story takes place in Death Valley, where the large scale action sequences take place amid post-apocalyptic landscapes of Las Vegas in broad daylight. Drawing inspirations from Western films and post-apocalyptic movies, including the Mad Max series, Extinction manages to reference such predecessors, with plot elements revolving around the shortage of oil, the shortage of supplies, a convoy traveling across a desert and the desert taking over civilized land.

Anderson stated that the film's story is original, and unfolds in a world that fans of the game recognize: "It's all part of trying to deliver a movie-going experience that satisfies the fans of the game but also provides a fun cinematic experience for a broader audience that has never played a Resident Evil game." The story takes place five years after the events of Resident Evil: Apocalypse. While previous installments in the series had minor changes to plot and characters, Extinction branches completely away from the video game series, as evidenced by the fact that Resident Evil 4 takes place six years after the events portrayed in Resident Evil 2, and the world has not become overrun with zombies. References to Code: Veronica are made, such as the replica mansion and the viral outbreak itself. A common element used throughout each Resident Evil film is the climactic battle, which occurs in the finale. Extinction marked the first appearance of herbs, a healing item in the video game series, as seen in Dr. Isaac's lab, and it also referenced the first film with the inclusion of a replica Hive facility, patterned after the one in Raccoon City, the Raccoon City Hospital, a holographic computer database known as the White Queen and the replica Spencer Mansion.

Numerous references to the video game series have been made, including zombies being unleashed through a T-virus mutation. While the concept of the undead remains the same, this film includes the "Super Undead". As Anderson explains, these are "a result of Umbrella experimenting with the Undead and attempting to give them back some of their reasoning power, some of their intelligence and a little of their humanity. Unfortunately, these experiments don't quite work and the side effect is the Super Undead, which are Undead that are faster, stronger and [a] more cunning foe." Other creatures from the video game series have also made appearances in the film, including the Tyrant, a swarm of crows and a pack of Dobermans (although Belgian Shepherd Dogs were used during production).

Two main characters were added to the film's cast: Albert Wesker (portrayed by Jason O'Mara) and Claire Redfield (portrayed by Ali Larter) from Resident Evil 2.

Horror magazine Fangoria featured the film in its August 2007 issue, and also on the cover of its September 2007 issue, talking with director Russell Mulcahy. The following details reported were inaccurate, possibly indicating to a change in the storyline:

- Alice's convoy are traveling across the Nevada desert trying to reach sanctuary in Alaska to meet Chris Redfield and other survivors. In the film, however, there is no mention of Chris, and the convoy is headed by Claire.
- The film would feature new "super zombies" that had been "pumped up on some sort of alter-essence steroids". The final "super zombies" are created using blood taken from clones of Alice.
- Mulcahy stated concerning the (what was then considered to be) ending of the film trilogy: "As far as I'm aware, this is indeed supposed to close the book."
- Resident Evil: Extinction takes place eight years after Resident Evil: Apocalypse. In the film, this was contradicted when characters stated that it had been five years since the outbreak.
- The character of Claire Redfield did not exist in the early draft scripts for the film, and previously Jill Valentine (who appeared in Resident Evil: Apocalypse played by Sienna Guillory) would continue the role in Resident Evil: Extinction. Later, producers Paul W. S. Anderson and Jeremy Bolt decided to have a separate game character appear alongside Alice, saying: "We thought, rather than bring Jill back, put her with another game heroine."

=== Filming and post-production ===
Resident Evil: Extinction began principal photography in Mexicali, Baja California, Mexico in May 2006 after filming locations had to be changed from the Australian Outback to Mexico, causing production dates to be pushed back repeatedly from November 2005 to May 2006. Numerous sets were designed by production designer Eugenio Caballero, including Umbrella's underground laboratory, the Las Vegas Strip, the New York-New York Hotel & Casino, Paris Las Vegas, Realto Ponte, Luxor Hotel and the replica of the Spencer Mansion. The film entered post-production in late July 2006, with details about production being kept secret, and with the film's special effects being covered by Tatopoulos Studios and Mr. X Inc., both of whom worked on the film adaptation of Silent Hill (2006).

In late June 2006, Sony released the film's first two production stills, which included Alice wearing a costume designed by her fashion company Jovovich–Hawk, as well as Claire Redfield.

== Marketing and release ==
The film's teaser trailer was shown with Ghost Rider on February 16, 2007, and was structured in the same manner of the "Regenerate" teaser trailer for Apocalypse. The film's website was launched by Sony on February 17, 2007, with confirmation of its September 21, 2007 release date.

The film's teaser poster was leaked onto the internet via a fansite in May 2007, before appearing on IGN, whereas a German website leaked concept art for Extinction, including vehicle and numerous set designs. The film's theatrical trailer premiered on Yahoo! Movies in late July 2007, with NBC releasing several scenes, including the crow attack sequence. The social networking website Myspace also featured numerous clips of four of the main characters—Claire Redfield, Carlos Oliveira, Nurse Betty and Alice. The official website for Extinction launched an online game titled Resident Evil: Extinction – Online Convoy Game in August 2007. On September 12, 2007, Sony released numerous promotional clips and television spots, and on September 17, 2007, the film's soundtrack was released, whereas the film's score was released on December 18, 2007.

On July 31, 2007, a full two months before the film's release, a novelization by Keith R. A. DeCandido was published. At 368 pages, it is the longest of all of the Resident Evil novels. DeCandido also wrote the novelizations of the first (subtitled as Genesis) and second films.

The Japanese version uses "Last Angel" by Koda Kumi as the Image song.

Resident Evil: Extinction was released on DVD, UMD, and high-definition Blu-ray Disc in North America on January 1, 2008. A Blu-ray release of the Resident Evil trilogy, featuring the three films in one package, was also released on January 1. A three-disc DVD set of the Resident Evil trilogy was also made available in 2008. Milla Jovovich and Oded Fehr filmed a commentary while Jovovich was pregnant, which Fehr expected to be shown "in a little square box in the corner" of the Blu-ray version. The DVD and Blu-ray versions of the film showed previews for Resident Evil: Degeneration, a trailer of Devil May Cry 4 and a video of Resident Evil 5. Resident Evil: Extinction was released on DVD in Australia on February 13, 2008, and in the UK on the February 18, 2008.

== Reception ==
=== Box office ===
Resident Evil: Extinction was the number one movie at the North American box office on its opening weekend, grossing $23 million in 2,828 theaters, averaging $8,372 per theater. As of January 1, 2008, the film had grossed $50,648,679 domestically, and $97 million internationally, for a worldwide total of $148.4 million.

=== Critical response ===
On Rotten Tomatoes it has an approval rating of 24% based on 101 reviews, with an average rating of 4.4/10. The site's critics consensus reads: "Resident Evil: Extinction is more of the same; its few impressive action sequences unable to compensate for the pedestrian plot." On Metacritic it has a score of 41 out of 100, based on reviews from twelve critics, indicating "mixed or average reviews". Audiences surveyed by CinemaScore gave the film a grade B− on scale of A to F.

Steven Hyden of The Onion′s A.V. Club said that "the movie delivers some simple-minded thrills" and praised the "solidly effective killer-ravens sequence" but felt the film was too predictable, saying: "Anybody who has ever seen a zombie movie can figure out what happens next. Somebody will get bit without telling the others, which will inevitably backfire. Survivors will be forced to shoot suddenly undead friends in the head. One of them dastardly science folk will protect the monsters in order to study them, which will also inevitably backfire. And legions of undead will be re-killed in surprisingly easy fashion."

Kevin Crust of The Los Angeles Times praised the film, saying that "the story and characters are surprisingly engaging, with fight scenes and scares effectively placed between plot turns" although he felt that the ending was too "open-ended". Scott Brown of Entertainment Weekly said that Extinction "plays like a flabby middle chapter, full of nerdy details but fraudulently short on the ruined Vegas-scape that ads have been promising." Jack Mathews of the New York Daily News gave the film a score of one and a half stars out of five, calling the action scenes "monotonous" and urging audiences to "flee this yawn of the dead." Helen O'Hara of Empire gave Extinction a score of two out of five, but said that the film was "better than Resident Evil: Apocalypse" and had "an effectively creepy empty world setting"."

Frank Scheck says that as the film is "fast-paced and filled with brisk action sequences", it should "reasonably satisfy the devotees." Maitland McDonagh of TV Guide gave the film a score of two and a half stars out of four, saying: "Equal parts Mad Max and Day of the Dead, [Extinction] is no less derivative than its predecessors but moves along at a brisk clip." Pete Vonder Haar of Film Threat gave Extinction a score of three out of five, saying that the film had "rather lazy pacing", but added that "the way Anderson keeps upping the ante with regard to Alice's ultimate fate continues to amuse."

A common complaint was the noticeable digital airbrushing on many close-up shots of Jovovich's face, which many reviewers found bizarre or unnecessary. The film won the Golden Trailer Award for Best Action Poster and was nominated for Best TV Spot.

== Sequel ==
A sequel titled Resident Evil: Afterlife, was released in 2010.

== See also ==
- List of films based on video games
