= Special Tactics and Rescue =

Special Tactics and Rescue may refer to:

Real-life Emergency Response Agencies

- Hamilton County Special Tactics and Rescue Service (STARS) team, Hamilton County, Tennessee, USA.
- Jefferson County Special Tactics and Rescue (STAR) team, New York, USA.
- Singapore Police Force's Special Tactics and Rescue (Singapore) team. The country's equivalent of a SWAT/HRT team.
- South Australia Police's Special Tasks and Rescue team.

in Fiction

- Raccoon Police Department's Special Tactics and Rescue Service (S.T.A.R.S.) unit, appearing in the Resident Evil video game series.
