= Resident Evil: Apocalypse =

2004 film by Alexander Witt

- Theatrical release poster
- Directed by: Alexander Witt
- Written by: Paul W. S. Anderson
- Based on: Resident Evil by Capcom
- Produced by: Jeremy Bolt; Paul W. S. Anderson; Don Carmody
- Starring: Milla Jovovich; Sienna Guillory; Oded Fehr; Thomas Kretschmann; Jared Harris; Mike Epps
- Cinematography: Christian Sebaldt; Derek Rogers
- Edited by: Eddie Hamilton
- Music by: Jeff Danna
- Production companies: Constantin Film; Davis Films; Impact Pictures; Screen Gems
- Distributed by: Constantin Film Verleih (Germany); Metropolitan Filmexport (France); Alliance Atlantis (Canada); Sony Pictures Releasing (United States and United Kingdom)
- Release dates: September 10, 2004 (United States); September 23, 2004 (Germany); October 6, 2004 (France)
- Running time: 93 minutes
- Countries: Germany; United Kingdom; France; Canada; United States
- Language: English
- Budget: $45 million
- Box office: $129.3 million

Resident Evil: Apocalypse is a 2004 action horror film directed by Alexander Witt and written by Paul W. S. Anderson. The sequel to Resident Evil (2002), it is the second installment in the Resident Evil film series, which is loosely based on the video game series of the same name. The film marks Witt's feature directorial debut; Anderson, the director of the first film, turned down the job due to other commitments, though stayed on as one of its producers. Milla Jovovich reprises her role as Alice, and is joined by Sienna Guillory as Jill Valentine and Oded Fehr as Carlos Olivera.

Resident Evil: Apocalypse is set directly after the events of the first film, where Alice escaped from an underground facility overrun by zombies. She now bands together with other survivors to escape the zombie outbreak which has spread to the nearby Raccoon City. The film borrows elements from several games in the Resident Evil series, such as the characters Valentine and Olivera and the villain Nemesis. Filming took place in Toronto at locations including Toronto City Hall and Prince Edward Viaduct.

Resident Evil: Apocalypse received "generally unfavorable reviews" on Metacritic, and became the lowest-rated film in the Resident Evil series on Rotten Tomatoes, with a rating of 18%. Despite this, it earned $129.3 million worldwide on a $45 million budget, surpassing the box office gross of the original film. It was followed by Resident Evil: Extinction in 2007.

== Plot ==
Former security operative Alice and environmental activist Matt Addison escape an underground genetic research facility called the Hive after a zombie outbreak. (Note: As depicted in Resident Evil) The pair attempted to expose illegal experiments being performed there by the pharmaceutical company Umbrella Corporation before they were taken into custody by Umbrella.

A team from Umbrella investigating the Hive is overrun by zombies, which spreads the outbreak to the nearby Raccoon City. In response, Umbrella quarantines the city and evacuates crucial personnel. Angela Ashford, daughter of researcher Dr. Charles Ashford, goes missing after her security car is involved in a collision during the evacuation. Meanwhile, disgraced S.T.A.R.S operative Jill Valentine returns to her precinct to urge her fellow officers to evacuate. Alice awakens in a deserted hospital and wanders the city for supplies while Umbrella evacuates civilians via the only bridge. At the bridge, Jill encounters her former partner, Sgt. Payton Wells, but a civilian turns into a zombie, biting Wells. Upon the outbreak reaching the bridge, Major Timothy Cain, leader of Umbrella forces, seals the exit, forcing residents back into the city.

After being abandoned by their employer, Umbrella soldiers Carlos Olivera and Nicholai Ginovaef team up with surviving police units to repel various zombie attacks. Their position is overrun; Nicholai is bitten and infected. Meanwhile, Jill, Wells, and reporter Terri Morales are saved by Alice just before being overrun. Umbrella deploys the mutated supersoldier, Nemesis, who kills the remaining STARS before searching for Alice. Dr. Ashford hacks into the CCTV system to contact Alice and the survivors, offering to arrange their evacuation in exchange for rescuing his daughter. He makes the same offer to Carlos and Ginovaef, explaining that Umbrella plans to destroy Raccoon City with a nuclear warhead to eliminate the zombie infection.

While heading to Angela, Alice and the group are ambushed by Nemesis. Jill kills Wells after he turns into a zombie. Alice fights Nemesis but is injured, leading her to draw him away from the others. Jill and Morales rescue stranded civilian L.J. and later meet Carlos to find Angela, though Morales and Ginovaef are killed. Angela reveals that the zombie outbreak stems from the T-virus, created by her father to treat her genetic condition, and she requires an anti-virus serum to avoid becoming a zombie. Alice uses some of the serum to cure Carlos. Dr. Ashford informs Alice of an extraction point with a waiting helicopter. The group reaches the rendezvous but is ambushed by Umbrella forces. Cain kills Dr. Ashford and compels Alice, revealed to be enhanced by the T-virus, to fight Nemesis. Alice subdues Nemesis but stops when she discovers that Nemesis is Matt, who was mutated by Umbrella's experiments.

Nemesis turns on Cain and attacks the Umbrella troops, but is killed while protecting Alice. The remaining survivors seize the helicopter and eject Cain from it, and he is killed by zombies. As the survivors escape, a nuclear warhead detonates over the city, and the resulting blast wave causes the helicopter to crash. Alice sacrifices herself to save Angela and is impaled on a metal pole. T.V. footage attributes the blast to a meltdown of the city's nuclear power plant, obscuring Umbrella's involvement.

Alice wakes up in an Umbrella research facility, and uses psychokinesis to kill a security guard. She escapes with help from Carlos, Jill, L.J., and Angela. As they leave, Dr. Alexander Isaacs, a top-ranking Umbrella employee, reveals that Alice's escape is part of Umbrella's plan.

== Cast ==
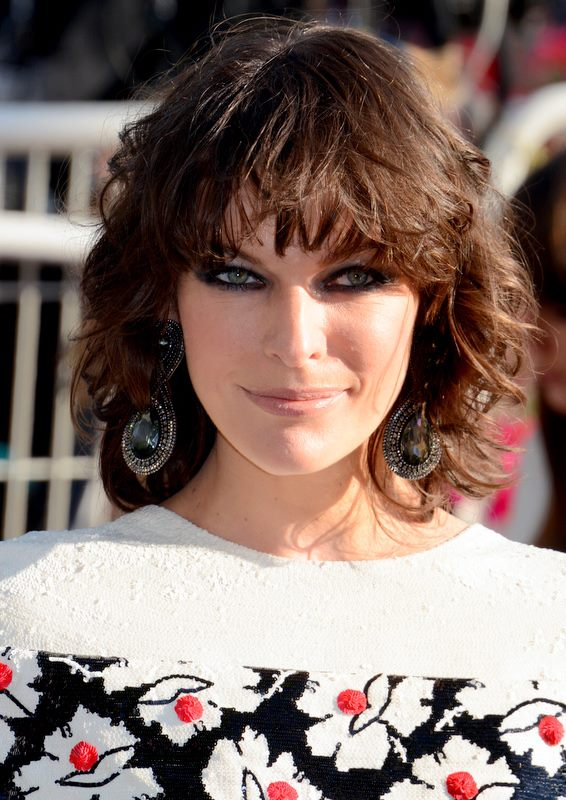
Milla Jovovich reprised her role as Alice in the film.

- Milla Jovovich as Alice
- Sienna Guillory as Jill Valentine
- Oded Fehr as Carlos Olivera
- Thomas Kretschmann as Major Cain
- Sophie Vavasseur as Angie Ashford
- Razaaq Adoti as Sgt. Peyton Wells
- Jared Harris as Dr. Ashford
- Mike Epps as L.J.
- Sandrine Holt as Terri Morales
- Matthew G. Taylor as Nemesis
- Zack Ward as Nicholai Ginovaef
- Iain Glen as Dr. Isaacs
- Stefen Hayes as Yuri Loginova

== Themes ==
Media studies scholar Stephen Harper said that both Apocalypse and the first Resident Evil film present "highly ambiguous" perspectives on corporate power, race, gender, and sexuality. Describing them both as postmodern and postfeminist texts, Harper argued that, despite containing some progressive elements, including feminist themes that undermine patriarchal power, the films also played into several stereotypes. He said the relationship between Alice and Valentine differs from interactions between male characters in action films as seen by a lack of camaraderie and co-operation between the two and, unlike male characters in Apocalypse, both Valentine and Alice are separately shown being "protective and nurturing" of the young Angela; Harper stated even violent action heroines are often portrayed with such characteristics. Harper also criticized how their revealing clothing and camera angles objectified Alice and Valentine throughout the film, and noted that through the African-American character L.J. Apocalypse showed an "ironic awareness" of racist stereotypes, though "it stops short of challenging them and, indeed, often deploys them".

Douglas Kellner from the University of California, Los Angeles argued the film's ending played "on fears of out of control nuclear technology and government cover-ups". A news segment shown in the film, which claimed that reports of corporate wrongdoing were false and that people should instead be thanking the Umbrella Corporation, was "a barely disguised allegory of lying by corporations and the state during the Bush-Cheney era".

== Production ==
=== Pre-production ===
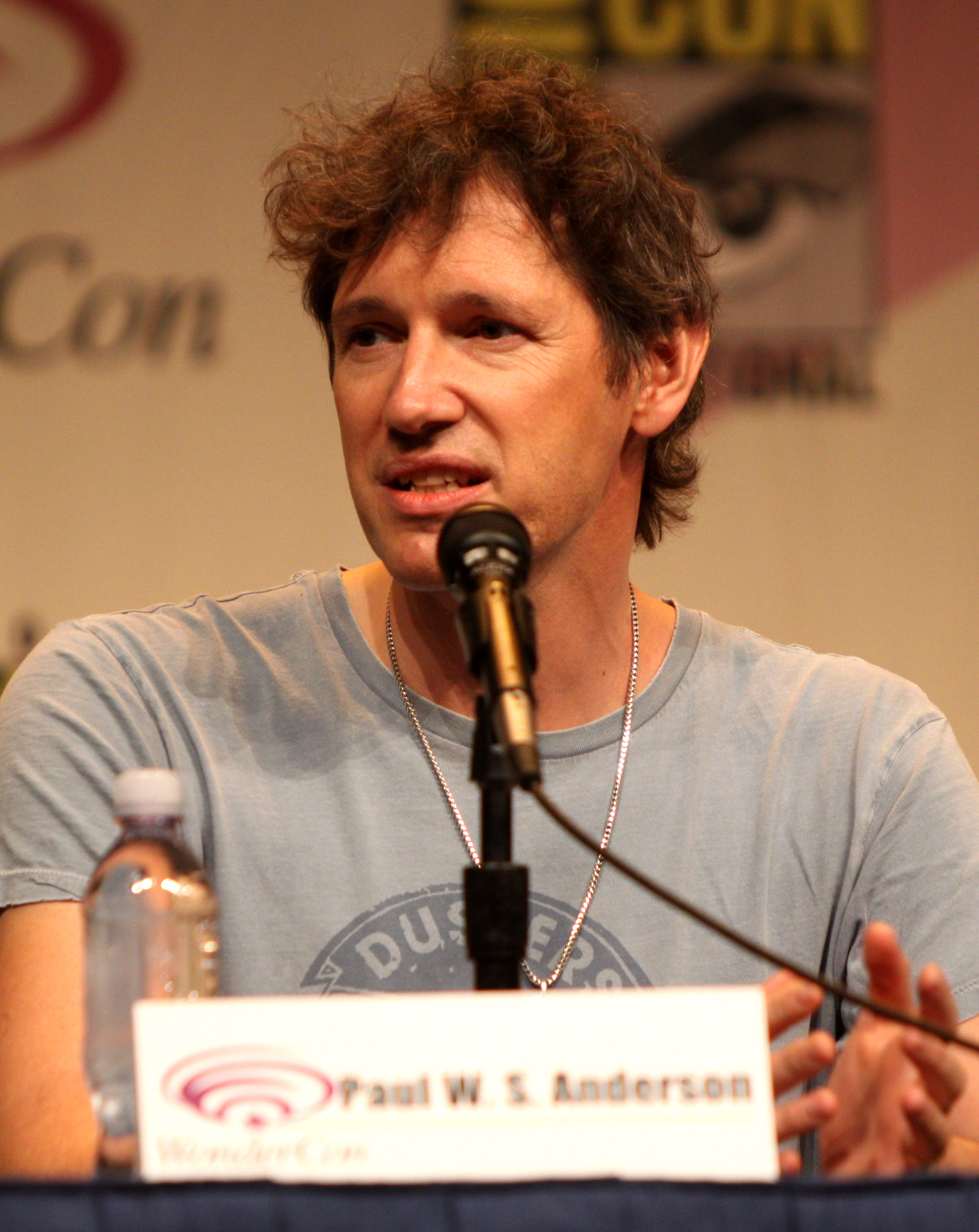
Paul W. S. Anderson turned down directing the film though stayed on as both producer and screenwriter.

While promoting the first Resident Evil film in late February 2002, Milla Jovovich and director Paul W. S. Anderson discussed a potential sequel. Anderson said he began writing the screenplay for the second film after completing the first, and had plans for Alice to meet up with Jill Valentine. Jovovich confirmed her character would return in the sequel if the first film was successful. In early March, Eric Mabius, who played Matt Addison in the first film, stated a sequel was confirmed, would be set in Raccoon City, and would feature the Nemesis character. The sequel was officially greenlit by Sony Pictures in mid-2002 but Anderson chose not to direct due to his commitments to Alien vs. Predator (2004). He stayed on as the film's screenwriter and as one of its producers. Anderson used the game Resident Evil 3: Nemesis as the basis of the story and wrote in elements from his favorite films, such as the perimeter wall in Escape from New York and the deserted city in The Omega Man. Alexander Witt was hired to direct the film, marking his feature film directorial debut. The script had already been completed when Witt was hired. He made some suggestions to Anderson and fellow producer Jeremy Bolt, which resulted in some minor script changes.

=== Casting ===
Jovovich was the only person to reprise a role from the first film. Mabius initially told reporters he would be reprising his role as Matt Addison in the form of portraying Nemesis, but the part ended up going to Matthew G. Taylor. Mabius still appears via stock footage from the previous film used in a flashback scene. The original film did not feature any characters from the games, but it had always been the intention to add several to Apocalypse. Reports of actresses who were approached for the roles of Valentine and Claire Redfield, the latter of whom did not end up featuring in the film, were made prior to production, though Anderson later dispelled these as baseless rumours. The role of Valentine went to Sienna Guillory who prepared for the role by studying Valentine's movements and posture in the games. The role of L.J. was written specifically for Snoop Dogg, though he dropped out of production and was replaced by Mike Epps; the character was rewritten to suit Epps's personality. Evanescence guitarist Ben Moody was given a cameo as a zombie Ginovaef kills.

=== Filming ===
Sienna Guillory's costume in the film (right) was based on Valentine's outfit in Resident Evil 3: Nemesis (1999).

The film was shot in Ontario, Canada; Toronto and its surrounding suburbs stood in for Raccoon City. Cinematography was performed by Christian Sebaldt and Derek Rogers, and filming took place at 47 locations. Very few sets were made for the film. Several city blocks were closed down and the Prince Edward Viaduct bridge was closed for three days so scenes could be filmed on it. Scenes were shot outside Toronto City Hall for two weeks. Jovovich and Matthew Taylor spent several hours a day for six weeks practicing martial arts together for the fight scene between Alice and Nemesis. The fight was originally scripted to appear in a train station and focus heavily on interaction with props, though was eventually shot in an open space outside Toronto City Hall after Witt decided to give the fight less screen time. Actors portraying zombies spent four days training with choreographers at a zombie "boot camp" to make sure they all had consistent behavior and movements. Anderson and other crew members considered making the zombies move faster but decided that it would be breaking a fundamental element of the games. Anderson only appeared on set for a couple of days due to other commitments, though he communicated with Witt via email about several dialogue and production changes during filming. The script's original ending had Alice escaping from Umbrella on her own via greater use of her telekinetic powers before meeting up with Valentine. Half of the scene was filmed before the ending was rewritten.

The original Resident Evil film took only broad elements from the games; Apocalypse incorporated many specific features from them, such as the re-enactment of scenes. The introductory cutscene of Resident Evil – Code: Veronica featuring Claire Redfield inspired the scene where Alice runs through a building while an Umbrella helicopter fires. The introduction of Resident Evil 3: Nemesis inspired another scene where Raccoon City is overrun by zombies, and the police and Umbrella soldiers are fighting back. Valentine's outfit in the film, which consisted of a tube top and miniskirt, is based on her costume from Nemesis. Anderson considered several ways to justify having the revealing costume in the storyline, such as making it her undercover outfit, though eventually decided to ignore the issue on the grounds that anyone questioning her attire "probably shouldn't be watching a Resident Evil movie". The film also references several aspects from the original game and Resident Evil 2, such as locations, place names, character moves, props, and camera perspectives.

=== Effects ===
Special effects for the film included green screens, computer-generated imagery (CGI), matte paintings, tracking, wire removal and scale models. The Nemesis character was created with a costume, and the only CGI effect added was an adjustment to his eye. Taylor was chosen as his height at 6.7 feet (2.04 m) and weight of 320 lb (145 kg) made him suitable to portray the character. The costume was specifically built for his body and weighed about 65 lb (29 kg). Despite the character's height, aspect ratios were still modified to make him appear 10–20% larger in certain scenes. The Lickers, a type of mutated zombie, were completely CGI. The effects team had originally used animatronics for some of the scenes, but were unhappy with the results. C.O.R.E. Digital Pictures won the contract to animate the Lickers, beating several other effects companies who had submitted preliminary designs, and described it as the most challenging special effect they created for the film. The studio created over 250 special effects including superimposing Jovovich's face onto a stunt double; Jovovich performed most of her own stunts though her insurance company would not allow her to attempt several of the more dangerous ones. Frantic Films created 78 special effects for the film including tracer fire, muzzle flashes, lasers and slow motion, using effects programs Eyeon Fusion, Autodesk 3ds Max as well as in-house software. Mr. X Inc. created additional effects including the scene showing the destruction of the Toronto City Hall building. Four months were spent making a 43 ft (13 m) 1/6 scale model of the building with 1,600 panes of glass, each of which was wired with an explosive to create the final effect. Digital intermediate work was completed by the Computer Film Company. Colors in the film were edited heavily in post-production, giving it a darker look overall while enhancing the brightness of blood and gore. The colors of the Nemesis costume were also tweaked to make it look more lifelike and Alice and Valentine were given modifications such as increasing the glow of their skin and redness of their lips.

=== Soundtrack ===
The soundtrack for Apocalypse was released on August 31, 2004, and contained alternative metal songs both featured in the film and "inspired" by it. Johnny Loftus of AllMusic gave the soundtrack three stars out of five, saying it was an "unscrupulous moneymaker" that predictably catered to the film's target audience of teenage boys, adding the "aggression, mania, and generally apocalyptic tone of this material fits well with a movie based on a video game about blowing away crazy zombies".

Jeff Danna composed the film's score performed by the London Philharmonia Orchestra. It was released on September 28, 2004. Mike Brennan from Soundtrack.net gave the score 2½ stars out of five, praising the blend of orchestral and electronic styles, though saying it "could have easily benefited from some more thematic development and a bit more variation in the sound of the music".

== Release ==
=== Marketing and box office ===
Marcus Nispel was hired to create a teaser trailer, titled Regenerate. It purports to be advertising a skin rejuvenation product created by the Umbrella Corporation, before the woman in the commercial turns into a zombie. By May 2004, the teaser had been downloaded 8.5 million times from the film's official website. Part of the teaser was shown in the film briefly on a television in the background and a part of it also appears in a mid-credits scene. The film's theatrical trailer was released on Yahoo! Movies in July 2004. A novelization of the film written by Keith DeCandido was published by Simon & Schuster the following month. Screen Gems created a faux newspaper, The Raccoon City Times, to promote the film.

Apocalypse opened at number one in the United States on September 10, 2004, where it grossed over $23 million on its opening weekend. The film also opened at number one in Hong Kong, Singapore, Malaysia, the Philippines and Mexico, and performed well in Japan, France and Brazil, though the horror film Saw overshadowed it at the box office in the United Kingdom, and it received a lackluster reception in Sweden, where it grossed $473,550. Earning over $6 million in Canada, Resident Evil: Apocalypse was the highest grossing, domestically produced Canadian film in 2004. Apocalypse went on to earn $129,394,835 worldwide against a budget of $45 million, surpassing the earnings of the first film which generated $102,984,862.

=== Home media ===
The film was released on DVD and VHS in North America on December 28, 2004. The DVD release included three audio commentaries, 20 deleted scenes, several featurettes and a blooper reel. DVD Talk awarded the film 3½ stars out of five for both video quality and special features. Releases on UMD and Blu-ray Disc formats followed in 2005 and 2007, respectively. High-Def Digest gave the Blu-ray release three stars out of five for video quality and 3½ stars for special features.

Special "Resurrection Editions" of both Resident Evil (2002) and Resident Evil: Apocalypse were released in a two-disc set on September 4, 2007. An exclusive scene for the then upcoming sequel Resident Evil: Extinction (2007) was included, along with several other bonus features. Trilogy sets containing the first three films were released on DVD and Blu-ray in 2008. "The Resident Evil Collection" consisting of the first four films was released in September 2012 on DVD and Blu-ray, a version containing the first five films was released on DVD and Blu-ray in December 2012, and "Resident Evil The Complete Collection" containing all six films was released on Blu-ray in May 2017.

== Reception ==
=== Critical response ===
On the review aggregator website Rotten Tomatoes, 18% of 130 critics' reviews are positive, with an average rating of 3.9/10. The website's consensus reads: "Resident Evil: Apocalypse has lots of action, but not much in terms of plot or creativity." Metacritic, which uses a weighted average, assigned the film a score of 36 out of 100, based on 26 critics, indicating "generally unfavorable" reviews. Audiences surveyed by CinemaScore gave the film a grade B on a scale of A to F.

Leonard Maltin rated the film a "bomb" in his book Leonard Maltin's Movie Guide and called it a "tiresome" sequel that ended up playing more like a remake. Roger Ebert gave the film a score of half a star out of four, calling it "an utterly meaningless waste of time" that lacked any wit or imagination and also failed to provide entertaining violence or special effects. He subsequently named the film the eighth worst film of 2004. Carrie Rickey of The Philadelphia Inquirer gave the film one star out of four, concluding that even for people interested in the biological horror genre, Apocalypse was "pretty generic stuff".

Dave Kehr of The New York Times gave the film a positive review, praising Anderson's screenplay and describing Witt's direction as "fast, funny, smart and highly satisfying in terms of visceral impact". M. E. Russell of The Oregonian said, "The bad news? The movie is monumentally stupid. The good news? It's a fun kind of stupid". The A.V. Club's Nathan Rabin said that it progressed too slowly to be considered a good film, "but when Jovovich finally starts kicking zombified ass, it becomes good enough". Ben Kenigsberg of The Village Voice said the film is "not without its moments of elemental dread" though he complained there was too much action and padding and not enough irony.

Gregory Kirschling of Entertainment Weekly, who gave the film a 'D−' rating, praised Jovovich but felt that "the rest of the cast was strictly straight-to-DVD"; Cinefantastique, on the other hand, commented that Jovovich looked bored and that Guillory's portrayal of Jill Valentine was the film's "saving grace".

=== Accolades ===
Resident Evil: Apocalypse won Best Sound Editing and the Golden Reel Award at the 25th Genie Awards, and was also nominated for Best Overall Sound. It was nominated for Best Sound Editing in a feature film by the Directors Guild of Canada, and for Best Make-Up at the 31st Saturn Awards. For composing the film's score, Jeff Danna was awarded the SOCAN International Film Music Award in 2007 and 2009.

=== Legacy ===
In 2009, Time ranked the film as one of the top ten worst video game films. While criticizing all three films released in the Resident Evil series at the time, they concluded that Apocalypse deserved their vote "Because, like any sequel, it's an enabler ... sequels to bad movies just enable further sequels to be considered". In 2016, separate journalists from Bloody Disgusting ranked it as both the best and worst film in the series. In 2017, Michael Nordine of TheWrap ranked it as the worst film in the series, saying its only redeeming features were the fact it expanded the series and the "awesomely stupid" fight between Alice and Nemesis.

== See also ==
- List of films based on video games
