= Umbrella Corps =

2016 video game

- Developer: Capcom
- Publisher: Capcom
- Director: Koji Wakasono
- Producers: Masachika Kawata; Michiteru Okabe
- Designer: Kenji Fukasawa
- Artist: Shuichi Kawata
- Composers: Kota Suzuki; Akihiko Narita; Azusa Kato; Yasumasa Kitagawa
- Series: Resident Evil
- Engine: Unity
- Platforms: Microsoft Windows; PlayStation 4
- Release: WW: June 21, 2016; JP: June 23, 2016
- Genre: Tactical shooter
- Modes: Single-player, multiplayer

Umbrella Corps (Note: Known in Japan as Biohazard: Umbrella Corps (Japanese: バイオハザード アンブレラコア, Hepburn: Baiohazādo Anburera Koa) and in Asia as Resident Evil: Umbrella Corps) is a 2016 tactical shooter game developed and published by Capcom. Released for Microsoft Windows and PlayStation 4, it is a spin-off of the Resident Evil series and was released worldwide in June 2016. The game received negative reviews from critics.

== Setting and story ==
Umbrella Corps, a paramilitary unit became active in infiltrating quarantined zones, taking advantage of the BSAA's inability to sterilize all sites of bio-terror attacks. Settings that resemble locations that have been destroyed such as Spencer Mansion and Raccoon City are explained as being recreations for training purposes.

The single-player portion, "The Experiment", takes place in 2012 and 2013. An agent codenamed 3A-7 is sent on missions by Umbrella Corps in order to test out new equipment such as the Zombie Jammer. Once the testing is successful, his superiors try to kill him by sending him on more dangerous missions. "The Experiment" ends with 3A-7 overcoming all odds and surviving all of the missions, scaring his superiors into comparing him to HUNK as the "new Grim Reaper".

The multiplayer portion takes place in 2016, three years after a worldwide bio-terrorist attack (Note: As depicted in Resident Evil 6) and 13 years after the collapse of the Umbrella Corporation in 2003/2004. (Note: As depicted in Resident Evil: The Umbrella Chronicles) A great deal of lost valuable viral Bio-organic Weapons (BOW) research information is left over from past evil endeavours. Umbrella Corps enlists 10 organizations: Suntech Samurai Co., Suntech Ninja Co., Medvedev, Sheng-Ya Pharmaceutical, Aeolus Edge East, Aeolus Edge West, Tenenti Inc., Saurian Corporation, Akembe Chemical, and Rashid-Sahir Industries to send their own special forces mercenaries into several infected sites, including Valdelobos, Spain, Kijuju, West Africa, Lanshiang, China and the Ashford family's destroyed facility in Antarctica to find assorted remnants and secrets of bio-weapons technologies which inevitably brings these companies into direct conflict with each other. Umbrella Corps' high-ranking official executive who can be heard speaking during the multiplayer matches is identified by voice as Albert Wesker or a clone of him.

== Gameplay ==
Umbrella Corps is a competitive multiplayer shooter that features zombies. Players play as a mercenary from two different corporations, and they are tasked to co-operate with their fellow mercenaries to eliminate all the hostile players. Players can choose to play from a first-person perspective, or a third-person perspective.

The game's maps are described as "compact battle zones" which have traditional historic Resident Evil themes and environments. The game features gadgets like semi-automatic rifles, shotguns, pistols, grenades and explosives, as well as unusual melee-weapons like Brainer combat axes. In order to travel between maps in an effective way, the game features repurposed climbing gear, as well as "Terrain Spikes", which can be used for traversing tough ground. There are three classes available for players to choose from; namely assault, short range, and tactical. Each class is equipped with different weapons.

In order to protect themselves against enemies, players can hide behind structures like walls. The game features a cover system called "analog cover", which highlights objects that can be hidden behind with a blue color. Players can peek out from the cover to attack enemies. The more players lean out from the cover, the higher the accuracy of their weapons. In order to reduce their visibility to their competitors, they can choose to crouch and prone. However, these actions sacrifice movement speeds. The brainer combat ax can also be used to deflect attacks from enemies. Players who are killed enter a spectator mode, in which the locations of opponents are revealed to them. They are unable to combat, but they can communicate with the surviving members of the team.

The game's maps are infested with zombies. Players are equipped with a gadget called "Zombie Jammer", which makes zombies ignore their presence. However, they would still get attacked by them if they were intentionally or accidentally shot. Players can disrupt their opponent's Jammer with the use of their "Jammer Buster", which would make them visible to zombies, and therefore, forcing them to deal with more threats. Zombies can also be grabbed by players and can be used as a shield. The game also features a progression and customization system; however, most customization items are purely cosmetic.

Unlike other games in the series, the game does not feature a main story-based campaign mode. Instead, it features a single-player mode known as "The Experiment". It is a horde mode that has 24 missions and tasks players to fight against waves of enemies.

== Development ==
The game was developed by Capcom's Osaka studio, which is Capcom's headquarters. The team aimed to create a game with concentrated fast-paced combat and multiplayer experience offered by current eSports in the market. Instead of a large open environment, the maps featured in the game are usually small and dense. The game drew influences from western-style shooters for Windows. The name of the Asian version, "Resident Evil: Umbrella Corps", was trademarked by Capcom on July 29, 2015, and was revealed at the Sony Computer Entertainment's press conference at the 2015 Tokyo Game Show one and a half month later. It is a downloadable game which also saw a limited physical release in Asia, and was set to be released for Windows and PlayStation 4 in May 2016. The game was later delayed to June 21, 2016.

== Reception ==
Reception

Aggregate score
| Aggregator | Score |
|---|---|
| Metacritic | (PS4) 38/100 (PC) 36/100 |

Review scores
| Publication | Score |
|---|---|
| Destructoid | 3/10 |
| Electronic Gaming Monthly | 5.5/10 |
| Famitsu | 36/40 |
| Game Informer | 5/10 |
| GameRevolution | 3/10 |
| GameSpot | 3/10 |
| IGN | 3.8/10 |
| Polygon | 3/10 |
| VideoGamer.com | 4/10 |

=== Pre-release ===
Reception to the game was generally negative. On its reveal, critics compared the game to the Call of Duty franchise and Capcom's own Resident Evil: Operation Raccoon City, which itself had a mixed reception. Andy Chalk from PC Gamer thought that the game strayed too far from the franchise and thought that it was a pointless addition to the series. Nicholas Tan from GameRevolution thought that Umbrella Corps was a standard and generic first-person shooter with a Resident Evil skin on it. Steven Burns from VideoGamer.com criticized the small size of the maps (which he considered “generally quite boring") and the field of view. He described Umbrella Corps as "a bizarre mishmash of styles and elements that don't fit together at all" and very expensive "for too little in the way of quality". However, Michael McWhertor from Polygon praised the game after trying it. He added that the game can offer "quick" fun despite being odd and thought that it suits its budgeted price. Some previewers said that the game looks nothing like a Resident Evil game. On June 15, 2016, Famitsu gave the game score of 9/9/9/9- 36/40.

=== Post-release ===
Umbrella Corps received "unfavorable" reviews, according to video game review aggregator website Metacritic. USGamer's Bob Mackey concluded that "just a little over a week after releasing, Umbrella Corps is essentially [dead on arrival]" on the PC platform when looking at old and new alternatives, including Overwatch and Left 4 Dead 2.
