= Umbrella Corporation =

Fictional corporation in the Resident Evil franchise

Umbrella
- Resident Evil organization
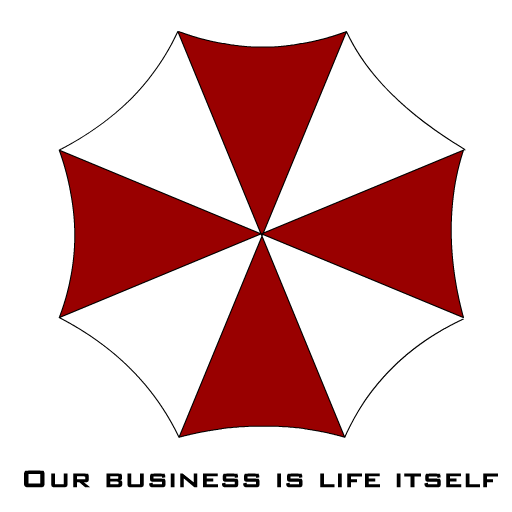
- Logo and slogan of the Umbrella Corporation.
- First appearance: Resident Evil (1996)
- Created by: Capcom
- Genre: Survival horror

In-universe information
- Other name: Umbrella Corporation
- Type: Multinational pharmaceutical and biotechnology corporation
- Founded: 1968
- Defunct: 2003
- Fate: Financial and operational collapse following government sanctions, litigation and the loss of its remaining facilities
- Location: United States
- Leader: Oswell E. Spencer
- Key people: Edward Ashford, co-founder; James Marcus, co-founder and virologist; Albert Wesker, researcher and operative; William Birkin, researcher; Sergei Vladimir, executive
- Purpose: Publicly: pharmaceutical research, medical supplies and consumer products; Covertly: viral experimentation and development of biological weapons
- Products: Pharmaceuticals and medical supplies; Consumer products; Mutagenic viruses; Biological weapons; Bio-organic weapons (B.O.W.)
- Motto: "Preserving the health of the people"
- Technologies: Progenitor virus; t-virus; G-virus; T-Veronica virus; Nemesis parasite; Tyrant Project
- Paramilitary units: Umbrella Security Service; Umbrella Biohazard Countermeasure Service

The Umbrella Corporation is a fictional American-based multinational pharmaceutical and biotechnology company in Capcom's Resident Evil franchise. Publicly presented as a medical and consumer-products conglomerate, Umbrella serves as a front for clandestine research into mutagenic viruses, genetically engineered organisms and biological weapons, known within the series as bio-organic weapons (B.O.Ws).

Umbrella serves as the principal recurring institutional antagonist of the franchise's early video games, in which its research causes the incidents at Spencer Mansion and Raccoon City in the United States. In the original Resident Evil, Umbrella remains largely concealed until the player discovers its underground laboratory beneath Spencer Mansion. Subsequent games progressively enlarged Umbrella's narrative role. Resident Evil 2 introduced the company's researchers and facilities within Raccoon City, while Resident Evil – Code: Veronica expanded it into an organisation with installations across the world. Later games introduced further agencies, subsidiaries and organisations associated with Umbrella's research or name. Different versions of the Umbrella corporate entity also appear throughout the franchise's film and television adaptations. Umbrella's red-and-white logo and corporate identity have also been used in Capcom's promotion of the franchise.

Critics have interpreted Umbrella as an embodiment of institutional corruption, unethical scientific research and corporate control. Academic analysis of the original Resident Evil has connected the organization with the corruption of nature, architecture and public authority, while critical commentary of the wider franchise has associated its research programmes with eugenics and the commercialisation of biological life. The live-action film iteration of Umbrella has also been analysed through its construction and surveillance of artificial environments, in which laboratories, cities, homes and their inhabitants are treated as reproducible objects.

== Background ==
In the continuity established by the video game series, Oswell E. Spencer, Edward Ashford and James Marcus found Umbrella in 1968 after discovering the Progenitor virus. Although incorporated as a pharmaceutical company, Umbrella is established as a front through which the founders can continue researching the virus and its capacity to alter living organisms. Spencer constructs the Arklay Research Laboratory beneath an estate designed to resemble a mansion, while Marcus is appointed director of an executive training facility elsewhere in the Arklay Mountains.

Marcus develops the t-virus from Progenitor virus samples as the basis of Umbrella's bio-organic weapon (B.O.W) programme and secretly experiments on trainees at the facility. His research creates a competing centre of power within the corporation. Spencer consequently recruits Marcus's former students Albert Wesker and William Birkin to assassinate him and appropriate his research, allowing Spencer to consolidate control over Umbrella and Birkin to continue development of the t-virus at the Arklay laboratory. Resident Evil Zero later depicts Marcus's experiments, death and apparent return, presenting the outbreaks aboard the Ecliptic Express and at the training facility as the product of Umbrella's internal rivalries as well as its biological research.

Umbrella would become economically and politically dominant in nearby Raccoon City. Its factories contribute to the city's expansion, approximately three in ten residents work for the corporation, and it finances welfare, public services, medical facilities and municipal infrastructure. Umbrella sponsors the city's Bright Raccoon 21 development programme and contributes half of the funding used to establish the police department's S.T.A.R.S. unit, while secretly operating research facilities beneath the city. Its influence extends to local government and law enforcement, including payments made to police chief Brian Irons to suppress evidence of the company's activities.

== Depiction ==
=== Video games ===
The original Resident Evil initially conceals Umbrella's role behind the unexplained murders and mutated creatures encountered at Spencer Mansion. The company is progressively revealed through documents, laboratories and the betrayal of S.T.A.R.S. commander Albert Wesker, an Umbrella researcher who has directed the police unit into the facility to obtain combat data from their encounters with its B.O.Ws. After the surviving members discover the underground laboratory, Wesker releases the T-002 Tyrant as a final field test. The creature apparently kills Wesker before attacking the survivors, who defeat it and escape as the facility is destroyed. The prequel Resident Evil Zero expands Umbrella's history by depicting the abandoned executive training facility, the early t-virus research conducted there and the consequences of Spencer's betrayal of James Marcus. By connecting the Ecliptic Express outbreak with Marcus's revenge against his former colleagues, the game presents the Mansion Incident as part of a longer history of experimentation and internal conflict within Umbrella.

In Resident Evil 2 and Resident Evil 3: Nemesis, a dispute over researcher William Birkin's G-virus contributes to a wider t-virus outbreak in Raccoon City. Umbrella deploys two different paramilitary organisations during the disaster. Its Special Forces, also known as the Umbrella Security Service, operate as a comparatively small unit trained directly by the corporation and tasked with recovering research and protecting its interests. The Umbrella Biohazard Countermeasure Service is a larger private militia presented publicly as an emergency-response force and recruited largely from experienced soldiers, fugitives and convicted criminals offered pardons or protection. Although the U.B.C.S. is ostensibly deployed to rescue civilians, Umbrella treats its personnel as test subjects from whom combat data can be gathered. Operatives designated as observers are embedded within the force to monitor encounters with B.O.Ws, recover samples and destroy evidence connecting the corporation to the outbreak.

Besides testing individual prototypes within laboratories, Umbrella also deploys Tyrants as mission-specific field weapons. Several T-103 units were sent into Raccoon City during the t-virus outbreak; one unit, designated T-00 and later known as Mr. X, is ordered to recover a sample of the G-virus and eliminate surviving witnesses at the police station. The Nemesis-T Type is deployed separately to locate and kill the surviving S.T.A.R.S. members before they can expose Umbrella's responsibility for the Arklay incident. Raccoon City is eventually destroyed by the United States government after the infection overwhelms containment efforts.

Umbrella also develops the Tyrant line at facilities outside Raccoon City and the United States. Resident Evil – Code: Veronica enlarges Umbrella from an organisation centred on Raccoon City into an international network. Claire Redfield infiltrates a company laboratory in Paris and is imprisoned at its Rockfort Island facility, which combines a prison, military-training centre and biological research installation. The story subsequently moves to an Umbrella transport and research base in Antarctica operated by the Ashford family, where the T-Veronica project had been developed independently of Spencer's principal research programme. Resident Evil Survivor depicts Sheena Island as the site of a weapons plant used to reproduce T-103 Tyrants and develop the experimental Hypnos-T Type. The island's research illustrates Umbrella's attempt to convert the Tyrant from an expensive laboratory prototype into a reproducible commercial weapon. Resident Evil: Dead Aim depicts an Umbrella-owned cruise ship being used for the clandestine sale and transportation of biological weapons.

Following the destruction of Raccoon City, investigations, litigation and the loss of several facilities contribute to Umbrella's financial collapse. Resident Evil: The Umbrella Chronicles depicts the company's final major stronghold in Russia, administered by Sergei Vladimir through a central computer called RED QUEEN. Vladimir employs specialised Tyrants as bodyguards and oversees the T-A.L.O.S. project at Umbrella's Russian stronghold. The acronym T-A.L.O.S. stands for Tyrant-Armored Lethal Organic System, which combines a Tyrant-derived organism with cybernetic armour and controlled directly by the RED QUEEN computer. It is presented as the culmination of Umbrella's weapons programme before the corporation's collapse. Chris Redfield and Jill Valentine destroy the facility in 2003, while Wesker independently infiltrates it and obtains Umbrella's research archives.

By the events of Resident Evil 4, Umbrella has ceased operating, although its former employees, viral samples and weapons research have dispersed into an expanding international bioterrorism market. In Resident Evil 6, the bioterrorist organisation Neo-Umbrella appropriates the company's name and deploys weapons created with the C-virus. Neo-Umbrella is not presented as a continuation or successor of the original corporate entity, its use of the name reflects Umbrella's continuing association with biological terrorism. The 2016 spin-off title Umbrella Corps is set after the original company's dissolution, where competing corporations employ mercenaries to retrieve biological research abandoned by Umbrella in the hope of becoming the next major player dealing with biological weaponry. Resident Evil 7: Biohazard introduces a separate organisation using the Umbrella name and a blue version of its logo, called Blue Umbrella. It presents itself as an anti-bioweapon company seeking to address the damage caused by its predecessor and supplies personnel and equipment for operations against later biological threats.

Resident Evil Village introduces lore revolving around the origins of Umbrella's founding, as symbols resembling the Umbrella Corporation logo are seen all throughout the village. The game's main antagonist, Miranda, was a mentor to Umbrella founder Oswell E. Spencer, and Spencer used her knowledge to develop the T-Virus.

Resident Evil Requiem explores the aftermath of the Raccoon City incident and Umbrella's downfall. Files found reveal that members of Umbrella, notably Dr. Marcus and his protege Brandon Bailey, had ties to the Connections, a criminal organisation that manufactures BOWs mentioned in both Biohazard and Village. To counter the Connections, Spencer creates the secret project Elpis and stores it in Umbrella's ARK facility located at the heart of Raccoon City. The Connections are revealed to have lobbied the US government to destroy Raccoon City during the outbreak, using the opportunity to organise Umbrella's downfall and take control of ARK. During the events of the game, former Umbrella scientist Victor Gideon and Connections executive Zeno attempt to use Grace Ashcroft, Spencer's adopted daughter, to access Elpis at ARK. In the game's good ending, Elpis is revealed to have been an anti-viral agent designed to treat all Progenitor virus based bioweapons.

=== Film and television adaptations ===
The live-action film series beginning with 2002's Resident Evil presents Umbrella as an exceptionally powerful commercial conglomerate. It owns the Hive, an underground genetic-research complex beneath Raccoon City where the T-virus is developed. After an outbreak, Umbrella sends a military unit into the facility and subsequently uses the survivor Alice as a subject in further biological experiments. The sequels to the 2002 film expand Umbrella into a transnational and increasingly authoritarian organisation whose facilities survive the global viral outbreak. It produces clones of Alice and other people, uses survivors as experimental subjects and constructs simulated environments in which viral attacks and biological weapons can be repeatedly tested. Resident Evil: Retribution places much of its action in an underwater Umbrella facility containing reproductions of Times Square, Red Square and suburban environments populated by clones.

The film series also depicts Umbrella through the Red Queen, an artificial intelligence created to administer the corporation's facilities. In the first film, the Red Queen controls the Hive and kills its personnel after the T-virus is released in an attempt to prevent the infection from reaching the surface. Later films expand her authority over Umbrella's laboratories, surveillance systems and simulated testing environments. In Resident Evil: The Final Chapter, the Red Queen assists Alice because her directive to preserve human life conflicts with programming that prevents her from directly harming Umbrella employees.

Resident Evil: Welcome to Raccoon City depicts a separate, more game-derived version of Umbrella as the dominant employer of a declining Raccoon City. The company conducts experiments beneath the city and prepares to abandon and destroy it when the resulting infection spreads.

The 2022 television adaptation presents another continuity in which Umbrella recovers from an earlier scandal and operates from New Raccoon City under chief executive Evelyn Marcus.

The 2026 film, which writer-director Zach Cregger suggested to be an alternate perspective of the Raccoon City outbreak depicted in the second and third games, follows a medical courier trying to deliver to Umbrella's scientists in a laboratory atop Raccoon City General Hospital a stabilizer that could make possible a cure for a viral strain that has escaped containment.

== Promotion and recognition ==
Umbrella's segmented red-and-white logo has become a recognisable element of the franchise. In 2017, Kotaku reported that a Vietnamese skin care clinic's logo was alleged to be nearly identical to that of Umbrella's, with its red and white color scheme. In 2019, Kotaku reported that users had noticed the logo of a Chinese company named Shanghai Ruilan Bao Hu San Biotech Limited resembled Umbrella's design in shape and layout. The comparison received additional attention because the real company also operated in the pharmaceutical industry, although the publication did not allege that the design had been copied.

Capcom has also used Umbrella's fictional corporate identity in promotional campaigns. In February 2026, it published a mock lawsuit in which Umbrella accused the Japanese food company Nissin of infringing the fictional "Umbrella Noodles" product through its Cup Noodles branding. The promotion included a fictional court filing and an advertisement featuring an Umbrella scientist.

== Reception and analysis ==
=== Institutional corruption and experimentation ===
Umbrella was ranked first on a list of fictional evil corporations published by Game Informer in April 2010. Tim Turi highlighted the company's persistence throughout the series, noting that it repeatedly returned to influence new biological disasters despite the exposure, infiltration and destruction of its facilities. He also considered Umbrella's internal rivalries and continued investment in biological-weapons research central both to its unstable history and its eventual collapse.

Charley Reed analysed the original Resident Evil through four overlapping forms of corruption: the corruption of media, nature, architecture and authority. Although the original Resident Evil initially presents its zombies and mutated creatures as the immediate threat, the game progressively attributes those creatures to organised human experimentation. Living organisms are transformed through experimentation, the apparently domestic mansion conceals an industrial laboratory, and Wesker's betrayal compromises the authority of the police unit investigating the killings. Reed argued that these violations of familiar systems and categories contribute to the game's horror by frustrating the player's expectations about how environments and institutions should function.

Philip J. Reed argued that the discovery of Umbrella's laboratory reframes the monsters as symptoms of a deeper evil: researchers and employees willing to create biological weapons, kill human subjects and obey corporate instructions for financial or professional benefit. The laboratory and its intended product, the Tyrant, establish Umbrella's employees and institutional objectives as the cause behind the immediate supernatural-seeming threat. The Tyrant consequently functions not simply as a final monster, but as the intended product of Umbrella’s research programme. Reed interpreted Lisa Trevor's history in the 2002 remake as evidence that Umbrella's cruelty is deliberate and institutional rather than the consequence of an accidental containment failure: Lisa and her parents are imprisoned and used as experimental material over an extended period, and Umbrella researchers continue studying Lisa after killing her mother and impersonate the latter to manipulate Lisa into cooperating with further tests. Reed considered that franchise's increasing accumulation of explanatory lore made the threat of the evil corporation more comprehensible but reduced some of the mystery surrounding the original game.

=== Eugenics and viruses ===
Freya Fenton described the franchise's viruses as a narrative backbone connecting viral research, genetic engineering, industrial sabotage and repeated outbreaks. Her account follows the origins and development of the t-virus, G-virus and their variants, placing Umbrella's laboratories and scientists at the centre of the franchise's early biological threats.

Kazuma Hashimoto argued that the franchise's persistent horror extends beyond zombies to eugenics. Hashimoto connected Spencer's interest in the Progenitor virus and the Wesker project with an attempt to direct human evolution and create a selected superior population. Under this interpretation, Umbrella functions not only as a commercial producer of biological weapons but as the institutional vehicle for Spencer's attempt to classify, transform and replace human beings according to his own hierarchy of value.

=== Corporate control ===
Nick Jones analysed the version of Umbrella appearing in the live-action films through theories of capitalist spatial production. Jones argued that Umbrella conceptualises physical space as geometric, programmable and reproducible. Wireframe maps, sterile white corridors and concealed facilities represent rooms and environments as empty containers whose contents and permitted activities can be determined by the corporation.

Jones identified the false office view inside the Hive and the Nevada testing facility in Resident Evil: Extinction as examples of Umbrella manipulating familiar environments to influence employees and experimental subjects. The Nevada installation combines reproductions of the mansion, the laser room and Raccoon City Hospital into a modular testing ground designed to deceive cloned versions of Alice.

In Retribution, Umbrella's simulations reproduce urban landmarks and suburbia without their geographic or historical context. Jones interpreted the suburban simulation, in which clones repeatedly experience a viral attack, as an example of the company transforming a culturally familiar place of safety into an instrument for testing controlled violence. The production of cloned people and replicated environments through the same industrial system leaves both identity and place subject to Umbrella's external management.

== See also ==
- List of fictional companies
