= Spencer Mansion =

Fictional mansion

- Resident Evil location
- Official Capcom render of the exterior of the Resident Evil 5 version of Spencer Estate
- First appearance: Resident Evil (1996)
- Last appearance: Resident Evil: Welcome to Raccoon City (2021)
- Created by: Capcom
- Genre: Survival horror

In-universe information
- Other name: Arklay Research Facility
- Type: Mansion
- Location: Arklay Mountains

Spencer Mansion is a fictional mansion featured in the Resident Evil franchise, and the primary setting of the 1996 survival horror game Resident Evil and its 2002 remake. Constructed by Oswell E. Spencer, the owner and co-founder of the Umbrella Corporation, within the Arklay Mountains, it was designed by architect George Trevor. Its construction was meant as a cover for a secret bioweapon laboratory known as the Arklay Research Facility. It is later encountered by the STARS Alpha team, including Jill Valentine, Chris Redfield, Barry Burton, and Albert Wesker. Despite realizing Wesker is an Umbrella agent, they defeat the Tyrant he sends after them, detonating and destroying the facility and mansion. A similar mansion is raided by Chris and Jill in the events preceding Resident Evil 5, where they confront Wesker after he kills Spencer.

Spencer Mansion was praised by critics as an iconic video game location, its design responsible for popularizing the survival horror genre in general. Its unusual puzzle-based design, which was designed more as a security system than a residence, became a mainstay of the series going forward, and it is known as one of the most famous examples of "evil" architecture in video games.

== Appearances ==
=== In video games ===
The mansion appears in both the original Resident Evil and its ports, as well as the 2002 remake of the game. The remake both extends the mansion and gives it a full graphical overhaul with significantly more realistic pre-rendered graphics. A replica of the original mansion appears in Resident Evil: Code Veronica as the Ashford's residence and a near duplicate appears in full 3D in Resident Evil 5's Lost in Nightmares DLC as Spencer's actual residence, albeit significantly more limited in scope. Another replica of the mansion is featured in Umbrella Corps. The mansion also appears in Capcom's Viewtiful Joe: Double Trouble and Puzzle Fighter.

=== In film ===
In George A. Romero's Resident Evil script, the Spencer Mansion was named the Arkley Mansion.

In the 2021 reboot Resident Evil: Welcome to Raccoon City, which follows the games' storyline more closely than the previous film series, Spencer Mansion appears as a setting, although it is investigated at the same time as the events of Resident Evil 2, rather than two months before that, as in the game.

== Development ==
Director Shinji Mikami's original idea for Resident Evil was a haunted house filled with evil spirits. However, due to his fear of ghosts, he changed the enemies to zombies, envisioning a scenario where the protagonist would be able to use skill and ingenuity to survive. In order to make players feel trapped, he surrounded the mansion with a thick, dark forest that made players relieved to get back indoors. The mansion's fixed camera angles were purposely given blind spots to increase tension.

== Reception ==
Mike Mahardy of Game Informer called Spencer Mansion "iconic" and "a memory that can't be easily forgotten". Describing it as standing in stark contrast to its wooded surroundings, he noted that its layout initially seems simple, but slowly becomes more complex as the player explores. Its routes soon overwhelm the player, causing them to rack their brain to connect the different, interlocking passageways. Saying that "every shortcut and stairway burns itself onto your mental map", he described the mansion as compelling the player to create a "mental dictionary", granting them a "sense of ownership that few games have approached today". Calling the mansion's puzzles "clever", and its inhabitants "adrenaline-pumping", he nevertheless singled out its sense of isolation as what made it a memorable setting.

Ewan Wilson of GamesRadar+ described the mansion as "the most famous haunted house in video games" and called it "a building born bad", noting that it was constructed for malicious purposes rather than simply becoming haunted over time. Calling it "a materialist spin on old genre tropes", he emphasized the fact that its monsters were created by "hard science". Giving an overview of the mansion's "surreal and labyrinthine" layout, he singled out its crushing ceiling trap as its most memorable early moment. Comparing it to Star Wars' trash compactor scene, he called it the first sign that the building itself wanted to murder the player. He also pointed out the mansion's similarities to the Overlook Hotel from The Shining, calling it "uncanny". Jamie O'Neill of Push Square called the mansion an "achievement in visual design", saying that it became an "archetypal structure" for future survival horror games. Andy Kelly of PC Gamer called "that creepy, puzzle-filled mansion" one of gaming's best horror settings.

The mansion's darker, and more detailed rendition from the 2002 Remake also received praise. Matt Casamassina of IGN remarked of it in his review of the game, "a mansion with fans that rotate and cast spooky shadows onto walls, with fluorescent lights that buzz on and off, illuminating dirty kitchens infested with cockroaches, with plants and grass that sway in the wind outside the house, puddles that splash and reflect the objects around them, and much, much more." stating that "the mansion calls to players -- its mood and promise of something special in the next room"

The reappearance of the mansion in Resident Evil 5 was called "almost a parody" by Samuel Claiborn of IGN, citing its "geeky, self-referential humor". He recommended the DLC to "die-hard fans", saying normal players may not enjoy it as much.
