= Zombies in Resident Evil =

Video game antagonists

A horde of zombies in-game

Zombies (ゾンビ, Zonbi) are recurring antagonists within the fictional universe of Japanese video game company Capcom's multimedia franchise Resident Evil, known in Japan as Biohazard. Introduced in the 1996 video game Resident Evil, they are mutated creatures with cannibalistic urges and severe epidermal necrosis. The zombies are usually created by biological weaponry, genetic manipulation, or parasitic symbiosis, unlike the corporeal revenants with mythological and supernatural origins common in other works of horror and fantasy. The game's sequels and film adaptations have also featured other types of zombies and related creatures that are presented as more agile, vicious, and intelligent opponents.

The Resident Evil franchise's zombies and associated creatures are widely recognized as among the most memorable video game depictions of horror themes and as an influential element of the survival horror genre.

== Development ==
Director Shinji Mikami said The Evil Dead and The Texas Chain Saw Massacre influenced the first Resident Evil video game. Mikami chose to have an infectious virus create zombies from humans. He told IGN that he recalled "feeling excited by the new idea that a virus—a real enemy that can't be seen by humans—would cause tremendous fear in people". Mikami chose a fixed camera perspective and tank controls, which he conceded were an awkward way to control movement but was the only method he could think of at the time that could make a horror game work: it meant the player could hear but not see a zombie coming.

The depiction of zombie behavior changed as the Resident Evil series expanded. Later titles presented an escalation of enemy types, introducing new creatures or reinventing pre-established ones. For example, Resident Evil 3 introduced zombies that could sprint and quickly lunge towards player characters. For Resident Evil 4, Los Ganados ("The Cattle" in Spanish), which have variously been described as "zombie-like non-zombies" or "very-zombie-like-but-not-officially-zombies" by video game journalists, represented a further evolution of the zombie archetype due to their intelligence and nimbleness. In Mikami's view, the horror genre had since transitioned from a preference for direct, physical horror to quiet, psychological horror. He observed that while many players have since developed an immunity to physical horror and the idea of zombies as a scary experience from past decades, in his view nothing scares human beings more than themselves as well as their societies and cultures, which represents a certain horror element that is timeless.

For the remakes of older Resident Evil titles, Capcom's developers could revisit and realize the potential of the original design behind enemies without the technical limitations of dated technology. In the 2002 remake of Resident Evil, zombies which are not successfully dispatched by a head shot or incinerated may resuscitate as fast-moving "Crimson Heads" resembling the silhouette of Count Orlok from Nosferatu. In the original Resident Evil 2, a specialized zombie called the Licker must first drop to the floor from walls or ceilings in order to engage the player character: according to producer Yoshiaki Hirabayashi, this is because the original game was presented with a fixed camera and tank controls which mandated a "stop-and-aim shooting system". In the 2019 Resident Evil 2 remake, the camera is placed behind the player character, which gives the player more freedom to control the camera and aim at enemies. This enables the player to search for a Licker that is attacking from an elevated position, in accordance with the original design. In acknowledgment of the high volume of gore depicted in the remake, producer Tsuyoshi Kanda explained that the notion of "truly terrifying zombies" is one of the title's major concepts, and that the developers spent much time and effort to convey "damage impact that feels weighty and real" when player characters repeatedly shoot at zombies as they come at them relentlessly. Kanda noted that high-resolution visuals are rendered and designed in incredible detail, which are then used as the basis to create their "world of wetness and darkness".

With regards to the primary enemy units of Resident Evil 7: Biohazard known as the Molded, producer Jun Takeuchi commented that their name infers that there may be a human intention to mould or create something as part of the backstory of these creatures, and that a deliberate creative decision is made by developers to move away from a virus as the source of mass infection that leads to the biohazard incidents in the narratives of previous titles. In Resident Evil Village, artist Tomonori Takano said the developers wanted to continue the same approach that started with Resident Evil 7 in that they wanted to move away from simply using elements like zombies to scare players but created unique situations and characters that would create fear in new ways.

In Resident Evil Requiem, developer Koshi Nakanishi said reimagining the zombies was "one of our main priorities". Nowadays, zombies are so common in video games that their flaws and actions have become predictable; for example, they are usually vulnerable to headshots. But the stress and worry are alleviated by that familiarity. He also stated that in this game, zombies still have some human instincts and intelligence. Some pick up weapons dropped by other adversaries to attack, while others replicate strange human actions obsessively. His goal was to turn zombies into dangers that constantly surprise players and make them nervous.

== Appearances ==
=== Video games ===
Zombies are introduced in the first Resident Evil as primitive yet deadly creatures roaming the derelict Spencer Mansion. They exhibit a shambling behavior similar to the zombie films of the 1970s, in particular George A. Romero's Night of the Living Dead film series. They moan and relentlessly shuffle towards player characters with arms outstretched and little finesse, and while their slow movement speed offers ample time for players to respond, zombies may absorb nearly a full pistol magazine before falling. The pharmaceutical conglomerate Umbrella Corporation, the primary antagonistic faction in the franchise's earlier games causes the death or drastic mutations to its hosts. Unlike Tyrants, which are genetically altered organisms Bio Organic Weapons (B.O.W.) by design, zombies are often unintentional side-effects of humans who are infected by the T-virus, a name given to a series of a family of RNA virus strains called "Progenitor virus", which causes death or drastic mutations to its hosts. A popular tactic to dispatch zombies is with precise lined up shots to the head, while other players may opt to conserve ammo by waiting for the zombies to veer slightly off course and attempt to run past them. Resident Evil 2 and Resident Evil 3 present a zombie apocalypse scenario where zombies appear in larger numbers, overrunning the entirety of the fictional Raccoon City which is located near the first game's mansion. They are presented as more limber in movement, though they may be knocked down when they take enough damage and dismembered if players target a specific body part.

Other zombie-type creatures in the series include domesticated canines infected with the T-virus, also known as the zombie dog (ゾンビ犬 zombi-inu). Unlike the slower human zombies, zombie dogs retain much of their agility with a noticeable increase in durability and aggression. Zombie dogs are usually depicted with active necrosis, for example a visible eye bulges out of their otherwise savage but proportional façade. Most of the zombie dogs encountered in the early Resident Evil games are of the Dobermann breed: the reason for the frequency was due to the Chief Brian Irons' in-universe suggestion to the K9 unit that the breed be used as the police dog for the Raccoon Police Department. Resident Evil 2 also introduced the Licker, a grotesque creature with an exposed brain that lacks skin, which attacks its prey with sharp claws and a long prehensile tongue. It is the result of further mutation in a zombie infected with certain strains of the T-virus, especially one that has consumed large quantities of biomass to sustain its metabolism. It is blind but extremely sensitive to sound, which can be mitigated with navigational tactics by savvy players. A Licker variant which appears in Resident Evil 5 is presented with a “fairly unremarkable sense of hearing", reflecting the game's action-oriented focus compared to its predecessors.

Resident Evil Zero introduced zombies which are swarmed and infested by T-virus infected leeches, which require players to adopt a different approach to overcome in combat. They are similar in concept to the later "Ooze" zombie type introduced in Resident Evil: Revelations, both of which are visually and functionally distinct from the more humanoid traditional zombie. Resident Evil 7: Biohazard feature the "Molded", semi-morphous black goo-like anthropomorphic monsters spawned from a type of isotropic mold that feeds on dead bodies. By coagulating through cracks and crevices, they can seemingly appear from out of nowhere to shamble towards the player, and their heads bob awkwardly and arrhythmically from side to side which may prove problematic for aiming. Resident Evil Village features the moroaică of Castle Dimitrescu, lumbering shackled creatures described as being very similar to the franchise's traditional zombies. According to the lore of Village, they are the result of Lady Dimitrescu's experimentation with the Mold pathogen from Biohazard.

Some later Resident Evil titles feature enemies which retain some semblance of intellectual faculty and are very different from the zombie archetype in earlier titles. The Los Ganados of Resident Evil 4 are infected by body-altering parasitic lifeforms known as "Las Plagas": they are capable of speech, somewhat agile, and possess adequate cognitive ability to utilize combat tactics like hurling axes and dynamite at the player character. Luis Sera, a supporting character in Resident Evil 4, compared these creatures to three species of flatworms, flukes that can influence their hosts' behavior: Dicrocoelium dendriticum, Galactosomum and Leucochloridium paradoxum. The parasites may sprout from certain individuals who have been decapitated and attack the player character when in close proximity. The Majini of Resident Evil 5 are similarly infected with the Las Plagas parasite, though they tend to be better armed with military grade weapons, which serves as the pretext for cover-based firefights as a gameplay mechanic. Resident Evil 6 features two types of zombie-like antagonists created from the newer C-virus: shambling zombies created through indirect exposure to the C-virus that behave similarly to the nimble main enemies of Resident Evil 4 and Resident Evil 5 though with diminished mental capacity, and the J'avo, created through direct administration of the C-virus. When the J'avo experience dismemberment or are sufficiently damaged, they exhibit regenerative abilities which cause drastic mutations similar in concept to hosts of the Las Plagas parasite. The spin-off title Resident Evil: Revelations 2 feature the Afflicted, which are insane human beings who have been severely tortured and bound in a mass of metal wire and spikes. The zombies in Resident Evil Requiem are infected with a mutant T-virus strain that preserves their higher brain functions, allowing them to retain their pre-infection habits and personalities as well the ability to use weapons, and therefore were not as reliant on their teeth to attack. The strain also has an unintended side effect of mutating zombies whose limbs are not dismembered, including seemingly-dead ones, into Blister Heads that have tumor-like growths on their heads and become faster and more aggressive. In rare cases, a Blister Head can mutate further into a Blister Borne, losing its agility and aggression but becoming more durable due to its growths spreading to the rest of its body, while destroying these growths causes them to spray infected blood that mutates nearby zombies into more Blister Heads.

=== Other appearances ===
Zombies have appeared in every live action Resident Evil film, and animated films like Resident Evil: Vendetta and Resident Evil: Death Island. Outside of recurring appearances in Resident Evil video game titles and animated films, the Licker has appeared in live-action adaptations such as the Resident Evil film series directed by Paul W. S. Anderson, the 2021 film Resident Evil: Welcome to Raccoon City, and the 2022 Netflix television series.

Outside of the Resident Evil series, the zombies appeared in the 2018 mobile game PUBG Mobile. The zombies were also featured in Resident Evil-themed attractions at Universal Studios Japan and Universal Orlando's Halloween Horror Nights.

== Reception and analysis ==
In his essay titled "How the Zombies Changed Videogames", Matthew J. Weise analyzed at length the presentation of zombies throughout the history of the Resident Evil franchise. He described the first Resident Evil game as the "Ur-Text", an original version of the game, and that Mikami created a "zombie game" in the same manner as a zombie film, a "media artifact built solely around the figure", the zombie. He formed a view that in retrospect, the zombies of Resident Evil represented a struggle to reconcile modern conventions of zombie behavior with certain video game conventions. On Mikami's choice to ground the franchise's antagonists from a scientific perspective, which involves an infectious pathogen, Weiss observed that the developers chose not to model the progression of zombie infection on the player characters, instead opting for conventional notions of health meter damage with considerations for marketable balance and player empowerment. Weiss argued that the developers have essentially engaged in a process called "selective abstraction", where they picked and chose which video game conventions would be superseded by common zombie fiction conventions, and vice versa. Weiss concluded that the franchise's biggest contribution to gaming aesthetics are its difficulty design and ability to instill a sense of vulnerability in players, as well as the depiction of its zombies to be as dangerous as their film counterparts, echoing the portrayal of the value of forethought versus panic within apocalyptic circumstances in Romero's films.

Commentators have attributed the enduring popularity of the zombie archetype popularized by early Resident Evil games in part due to the fact that zombie enemies are not expected to exhibit significant levels of intelligence, making them relatively straightforward to program. On the other hand, Mielke opined that Resident Evil 4 was a successful attempt at adhering to a proven formula while changing its conventions, and that the move away from the Umbrella Corporation storyline and "proper zombies" was a welcome change for the series. To Patrick Shanley from The Hollywood Reporter, Resident Evil 4 "nailed dread and had such a cool tweak on the classic zombie formula" which highlighted the elasticity of the "zombie" term, and demonstrated other possibilities which could be explored with the creature archetype. Shanley's colleague Richard Newby shared similar sentiments and suggested that the Las Plagas parasite introduced in Resident Evil 4 further broadened the zombie genre.

The Licker's introduction is often cited as one of the most iconic or memorable moments of the Resident Evil franchise.

Certain specific zombie-type creatures, such as the zombie dog and the Licker, have received particular attention from video game journalists. IGN said the zombie dog jump scare scene in the first game set a defining tone of "gnawing unease" for the rest of Resident Evil. Both The Guardian and Kotaku considered the zombie dog window scene to be one of the greatest video games jump scares; Kotaku′s Cameron Kunzelman in particular emphasized it as the "original moment in frightening PlayStation users". Jordan Devore of Destructoid called the window scene an "amazingly scary sequence". The Licker has appeared in multiple "top" lists by critics, which highlight it as one of the greatest or scariest enemies in video games. As it is associated with the franchise's brand identity, the Licker has been the subject of multiple items of merchandise. The Regenerador has also have often been lauded as a memorable horror element of Resident Evil 4, in spite of the game's more action-oriented gameplay compared to its predecessors. Some critics have included the Regenerator in retrospective "top" lists of the scariest or most memorable monsters in video games. The Regenerators and the Las Plagas parasite serve as sources of inspiration for the development of the Necromorph monsters from Dead Space.

Aaron Potter from PCGamesN felt that Capcom have restored their signature zombies to the "threatening and unrelenting force" they once were with 2019's Resident Evil 2, following a period of time where the franchise's zombies were seen to have lost their scariness. In particular, Potter said the idea of "wetness" as conveyed by Kanda sets apart the gore in 2019's Resident Evil 2 from the presentation seen in most other horror-themed video games, noting the "horrendous ways the human anatomy can be mutilated" and the gruesome displays of gore that follow whenever zombies are dispatched by players. Robert Zak from GamesRadar+ formed a view that the Molded serve as a precursor to the zombies of the 2019 Resident Evil 2 remake, which was released two years after Resident Evil 7, and opined that this is an intentional design decision for players to rediscover the horror of confronting slow moving enemies within tight spaces, as the movements of both types of creatures seemingly parallel each other.

=== Cultural impact ===
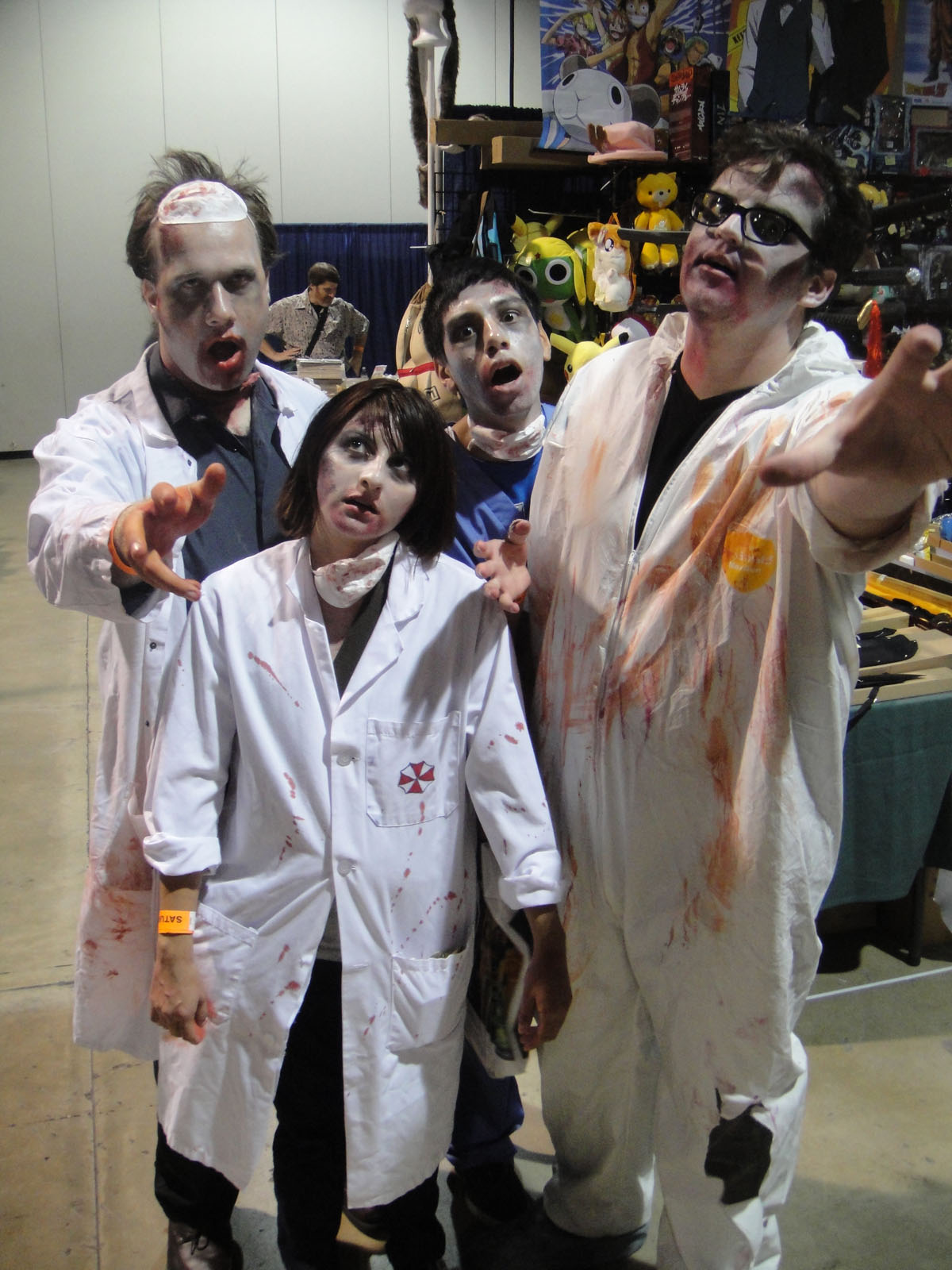
Cosplayers portraying zombies who were Umbrella Corporation employees

Various commentators, including George A. Romero and British actor Simon Pegg, said the Resident Evil series helped revitalize the zombie and lead it to prominence in early-21st century popular culture. Book of the Dead: The Complete History of Zombie Cinema called it the "Resident Evil effect". The realistic, scientific approach for explaining zombie origins became a standard trope in popular fictional works released after the first Resident Evil video game. Tim Turi from Game Informer formed a similar view that the varied depictions of zombies and related monsters throughout the history of Resident Evil are trend-setting, in particular marking the zombie genre's shift from supernatural themes to scientific themes. James Mielke from IGN commented that zombies as presented by Shinji Mikami and Capcom represented an evolution of the zombie archetype and are continually reinvented as a mass-market concern, with the franchise setting the tone for the survival horror genre and achieving immense commercial success in a manner which its contemporaries did not achieve: the video game series sold 100 million units worldwide by 2020, and by 2011 the Resident Evil film adaptations was described by Guinness Book of World Records as the most successful film series based on video games.

Kim Newman said that zombie films released after Resident Evil tend toward a more action-oriented approach between protagonists and zombie than previous films. Since the early 2010s, wrote Josh Levin from Slate, the Resident Evil video games drove the mainstream popularization of a new type of zombie, the fast zombie or running zombie, like the franchise's zombie dogs.
