= Biohazard 3 =

Biohazard 3 may refer to:

- Resident Evil 3: Nemesis, a 1999 video game
  - Resident Evil 3 (2020 video game), 2020 remake of the above
- Resident Evil: Extinction, the third live-action film in the Resident Evil series, released in 2007
- Resident Evil: Vendetta, the third CG film in the Resident Evil series, released in 2017
- Biohazard level 3, category to distinguish the severity of biological agents
