= Nemesis (Resident Evil) =

Fictional character in Resident Evil franchise

- Resident Evil character
- Nemesis from Marvel vs. Capcom: Infinite
- First game: Resident Evil 3: Nemesis (1999)
- Created by: Shinji Mikami; Kazuhiro Aoyama
- Designed by: Yashuhisa Kawamura (writing); Yoshinori Matsushita (design)
- Voiced by: Various: Tony Rosato (Resident Evil 3: Nemesis) Taira Kikumoto (Ultimate Marvel vs. Capcom 3) Gregg Berger (Operation Raccoon City) Tōru Nara (Project X Zone 2) Damon Dayoub (Marvel vs. Capcom: Infinite) David Cockman (Resident Evil 3) Sébastien Croteau (Dead by Daylight)
- Portrayed by: Matthew G. Taylor (Apocalypse)

In-universe information
- Species: Tyrant

The Nemesis, also called Nemesis-T Type, or the Pursuer (Japanese: 追跡者, Hepburn: Tsuisekisha) in Japan, is a character in the Resident Evil survival horror video game series created by Capcom. Although smaller than other Tyrant models, the creature dwarfs a typical human, and possesses vastly superior intelligence and physical dexterity to its undead peers. It was featured in Resident Evil 3: Nemesis (1999) before appearing in other games and cameo roles. It is also featured on various merchandise and was portrayed by Matthew G. Taylor in the 2004 film Resident Evil: Apocalypse. The character is voiced by Tony Rosato in the original game and Gregg Berger in Operation Raccoon City (2012). In the 2020 remake of Resident Evil 3, the character is voiced by David Cockman, with Neil Newbon providing the motion capture performance. Nemesis has also been featured in several other game franchises, including as a playable character in Marvel vs. Capcom and Dead by Daylight.

Taking inspiration from the T-1000 from Terminator 2: Judgment Day, Nemesis was conceived by Shinji Mikami and Kazuhiro Aoyama as an enemy that would stalk the player throughout the game and invoke a persistent sense of paranoia. Written by Yashuhisa Kawamura to be a weapon of revenge by the Umbrella Corporation, Nemesis's design was drawn by artist Yoshinori Matsushita, who was instructed to create "a rough guy who attacks with weapons and has an intimidating build" in order to heighten the fear of being pursued. Since his introduction, Nemesis has received a positive response and become one of the franchise's most popular figures. Various publications have praised him as an intimidating villain and critics have highlighted him as one of their favorite and most terrifying monsters in video games. However, his role in the Resident Evil 3 remake was met with mixed reviews.

== Conception and creation ==
Introduced in Resident Evil 3: Nemesis, producer Shinji Mikami and director Kazuhiro Aoyama wanted to implement a stalker-enemy into the game early on that would chase the player, according to Mikami intended to "introduce a new kind of fear into the game, a persistent feeling of paranoia." Taking inspiration from the T-1000 villain from the film Terminator 2: Judgment Day, the character was initially meant to be a slime creature that could bypass obstacles such as doors by liquifying past them or melting through them. However, due to the undistinguished nature of the creature, he felt the stalker aspect was lost on the player as there was no recognizable sense of cohesion. They decided to start over, focusing on the early Tyrant enemy introduced in the original Resident Evil as a base. The character was designed under the concept of a "huge, overpowering monster that could use weapons and intelligently track you anywhere", partly inspired by the movie Day of the Dead, where scientists attempt to train zombies, only to be shot by them at the end of the film.

The character's backstory and biology was created by writer Yashuhisa Kawamura, who felt the horror aspect of Resident Evil was "stuck in a rut" at that time and wanted to explore new ways to bring horror through Nemesis. Kawamura conceived the character as the result of infecting a T-103 model Tyrant—a humanoid bio organic weapon (BOW) created to be the ultimate lifeform by the Umbrella Corporation—with the Nemesis Alpha parasite (or "NE-α") designed to increase its intelligence. Upon infection, the parasite takes control of the Tyrant's nervous system, forming its own brain and enabling it to follow precise instructions and make decisions without needing constant direction. Upon spotting its target, it says the target's name out loud and attacks. In this backstory, the European branch of Umbrella intended to not only demonstrate their superiority in the company with their creation, but also seek revenge against the "S.T.A.R.S." police group that had destroyed their original Tyrant creation, codenaming their new creature "Nemesis" after the Greek mythology Goddess of Vengeance.

=== Design ===
Nemesis' design emphasized asymmetry in contrast to Mr. X, but also implemented multiple belts to keep the parasite restrained

Nemesis' appearance was designed by Yoshinori Matsushita, with Aoyama instructing him to create "a rough guy who attacks with weapons and has an intimidating build" in order to heighten the fear of being pursued. Although some elements remained consistent among them, the early designs featured several different degrees of surface damage as well as various options for clothing, such as a protective vest instead of a coat, or a nude design similar to the original Tyrant. Clothed in black trousers, an overcoat, boots, and gloves, the Nemesis is armed with a rocket launcher mounted on its left arm. A parasite was added to help further characterize it. To emphasize its design as a prototype, the game developers left exposed muscles on its body and added stitches to cover its right eye. It lacks lips and a nose, with the underneath facial muscles and teeth completely exposed. As Nemesis is damaged, its appearance does not change as drastically as previous Tyrants, due to Matsushita wanting to keep him visually different from Resident Evil 2's William Birkin.

The secretions from the parasite give the Nemesis massively heightened regenerative abilities, which result in the creature being almost impervious to damage. Although it can be put down with enough fire from small arms, it will eventually repair itself and resume the pursuit of its targets. However, this resulted in unexpected side effects, including damage to the skin and the emergence of additional tentacles, as well as unpredictable mutations caused by further attacks. In Resident Evil 3, the creature's survival instincts eventually override Nemesis' programming, causing the host's body to reject the parasite and transform into a giant digestive organ. Featuring large central bone protrusions and elongated tentacles, it crawls looking for prey, yet continues trying to complete its mission despite its now diminished intelligence. This design proved to be the most difficult for Matsushita, as he worked to try to make it appear as unique as possible. To this end he designed it to be a quadrupedal creature facing upwards, with the fang-like protrustions from the body being Nemesis's exposed ribs.

In the 2020 remake of Resident Evil 3, the producer indicated that the reinvention of Nemesis was influenced by Mr. X from Resident Evil 2. According to producer Peter Fabiano, "During development, our director saw what the team did with Tyrant in last year's RE2 and was determined to surpass that with Nemesis." He also goes on to say that the team intends to transform Nemesis into its own brand of terror, "a relentless pursuer with its own arsenal of weapons." The parasite's origins are partially retconned in the 2020 remake to be a genetically engineered copy of the Las Plagas parasite, introduced in Resident Evil 4. Since Nemesis is a prototype and not a completed model, its body is covered in haphazard restrictive gear from head to toe consisting of thick black plastic and various warning labels over the body. A large metal device on its chest regulates the parasite, and also keeps it from going out of control. It now retains both eyes and the Tyrant's original nose, but with the skin stretched drastically on the face resulting in a broken crooked nose. The aim was to contrast between Nemesis and Mr. X, with the latter having the more completed look. As with the original, the remake Nemesis also mutates after suffering heavy damage. However, the development team chose to give it a more animalistic, quadrupedal body with diminished intelligence, the in-universe reasoning being that the parasite could no longer maintain a humanoid form. Dubbed "Type 2", it was designed so the player could not evade it as easily as the original, but that its movements could be better anticipated.

== Appearances ==
=== In video games ===
Nemesis first appears in the 1999 PlayStation game Resident Evil 3: Nemesis as the main antagonist. The product of years of research, the prototype is deployed by the Umbrella Corporation as a field test to hunt and kill the STARS police team before they can expose Umbrella's activity in the Arklay mountains. The protagonist, Jill Valentine, first encounters the Nemesis outside Raccoon City's police station where it kills Brad Vickers and then pursues her, uttering "STARS..." on sight. The Nemesis continues to stalk Valentine throughout the game, attacking with physical blows and grabs, and later, armed with a rocket launcher. After losing its overcoat as a result of heavy damage, the Nemesis mutates, and gains the ability to attack with long, extendable tentacles. Despite later being doused in acid, the Nemesis continues its pursuit, and mutates into a much larger, tentacled monster after absorbing a dead Tyrant, gaining the ability to spew poison. Jill finally defeats the Nemesis using a rail cannon, and then depending on the choice of the player, she either kills it once and for all by unloading her weapons into it, or leaves it to die in the nuclear explosion that destroys Raccoon City.

After its initial appearance, it shows up in other Resident Evil games such as Resident Evil Survivor 2 – Code: Veronica, in which it will chase the player if they fail to complete a level before the time limit expires and kill them instantly if it hits them. It can also be fought as a secret boss armed with a rocket launcher if the player has met the proper conditions upon finishing the game. The Nemesis returns for the Resident Evil 3 chapter of Resident Evil: The Umbrella Chronicles, in which it pursues Jill in the same manner as the original game and mutates into its secondary form as a boss. The Nemesis also appears in Resident Evil: Operation Raccoon City, in which its programming is damaged and Umbrella dispatches a task force to find a NE-Alpha parasite to repair it. Once the parasite is found, they defeat Nemesis and inject it with the parasite. In the game, it uses a gatling gun for the fight and is mainly based on its film counterpart. However, once the task force completes their mission, the Nemesis awakens to find its rocket launcher and proceeds to hunt after the STARS police team. In the 2020 remake of Resident Evil 3, Nemesis returns as the game's first boss fight, wielding a flamethrower. Nemesis also appeared as a playable character in Resident Evil: Resistance and in Resident Evil Re:Verse, a companion game to Resident Evil Village.

The character has been featured in other games outside of the Resident Evil franchise as well, such as in the Capcom game Under the Skin alongside Jill, and serves as a boss the player must steal coins from in a Raccoon City-inspired level. In an interview, Marvel vs. Capcom 3: Fate of Two Worlds producer Ryouta Niitsuma stated a desire to use the Nemesis as a "monster-type" character from the Resident Evil series, but was dropped after considering it too "grotesque and disgusting" and in consideration of ESRB ratings. The character would instead appear briefly in the game's ending sequence for the Hulk. However, despite the initial concerns about its inclusion, the Nemesis appears as a playable character in Ultimate Marvel vs. Capcom 3, an updated version of Marvel vs. Capcom 3. The Nemesis returns as a playable character in Marvel vs. Capcom: Infinite. In the story, following the Convergence, it is captured by A.I.M.brella leader M.O.D.O.K. and reprogrammed as his enforcer; it later battles and is defeated by Chris Redfield and Mike Haggar. In the tactical role-playing game Project X Zone, Nemesis appears as a rival unit. He reappeared as a recurring rival unit in Project X Zone 2 as well. Nemesis appeared in an online multiplayer battle royale game Knives Out as a costume from July 29 to August 12, 2021. Nemesis, along with Leon S. Kennedy and Jill Valentine, appeared in Dead by Daylight as playable characters.

Cards based on Nemesis appear in the SNK vs. Capcom: Card Fighters series. He was also included in the 2012 mobile games Minna to BIOHAZARD Clan Master in both its regular and damaged states from Resident Evil 3. In the 2019 game TEPPEN, a card for the character was added in its "Day of Nightmares" expansion, and later another in its "A Dark Agenda" expansion, this one modeled after its appearance in the Resident Evil 3 remake. His outfit also appears in Dead Rising Deluxe Remaster (2024) for Frank West. In printed trading card media, he appears in the Bandai produced game Resident Evil: The Deck Building Game.

=== In film ===
The Nemesis is featured in the 2004 film, Resident Evil: Apocalypse, portrayed by Matthew G. Taylor. The character's design is mostly unchanged, brandishing a rocket launcher and similar attire, but with the addition of a forearm-mounted rail gun, modeled after a heavily modified minigun. Writer and producer Paul W. S. Anderson noted that the gun's addition was inspired by the idea of the Nemesis "walking around with a gigantic, powerful weapon in each hand and almost indecisive as to which one to use". The costume for Nemesis was created by Kropserkel Inc. and PJFX Studios, and stands roughly 7 feet 3 inches (2.21 m) tall, weighing nearly 100 pounds (45 kg). After production of Apocalypse was completed, the costume was restored and put on display at Kropserkel's offices.

While The Nemesis' design remained similar, the character itself was expanded upon, now portrayed as a tragic villain. Formerly Matt Addison (portrayed by Eric Mabius), a survivor of the events of the first film, was infected with the T-virus after being scratched by a Licker and later captured and experimented upon by the Umbrella Corporation. Transformed into the Nemesis, he is sent to kill the surviving members of STARS, but remembers his humanity after fighting Alice, and fights alongside the protagonists towards the film's conclusion. The Nemesis is eventually crushed beneath a crashing helicopter, and is later killed by the nuclear explosion that destroys Raccoon City.

=== In printed adaptations ===
The Nemesis appears in a 1999 Hong Kong manhua adaptation of Resident Evil 3 by Lee Chung Hing, Biohazard 3: Last Escape, which is named after the game's Japanese title. The 27-issue series adds to the Nemesis' backstory, detailing its origin by showing the infection and transformation of the original Tyrant by the Nemesis parasite. Some elements are changed for its design, such as the Nemesis retaining both eyes initially, and then losing the right eye and gaining cranial staples only after an encounter with Jill. The comic also introduces characters from Resident Evil 2 into the storyline, which results in several face-offs between the Nemesis and the mutated William Birkin throughout the series. During these fights, Nemesis remembers before being experimented on his life as a boxer whose family had been infected and killed by a sadistic Umbrella executive. Encountering the man after defeating Birkin, Nemesis bites his head clean off in a fit of rage.

In 2000, Simon & Schuster published a novelization of Resident Evil 3, written by S. D. Perry. Though left unchanged for the most part, the Nemesis is immediately recognized as a modified Tyrant in the novel, which Jill dubs the "Nemesis" after thinking about why it hunts her. Instead of mutating due to having taken damage, the Nemesis transforms voluntarily towards the conclusion of the story in its pursuit of Jill, with its second form from the game being its actual appearance beneath the coat.

A novelization of Apocalypse was released in 2004, written by Keith R. A. DeCandido. In the book, Matt and the Nemesis act as separate personalities in the same body, both aware, but with the Nemesis dominant. Matt eventually regains control after his body is impaled on a metal shard while fighting Alice, by showing the Nemesis his memories of Umbrella's experimentation upon "them". The Nemesis is later mentioned in the 2007 novelization of Resident Evil: Extinction, in which antagonist Doctor Isaacs considers the Nemesis both his greatest success and his greatest failure, hating mention of it and blaming its defection and destruction upon Umbrella's desire to immediately field test it.

== Promotion and reception ==
Nemesis appears on the cover of every version of Resident Evil 3, and is mentioned prominently on flyers for Resident Evil: Survivor 2. Capcom has also released commercial products based on the character, such as a silver ring modeled after Nemesis's head available for purchase through their Japanese online store. Palisades Toys used its likeness to make a posable action figure (packaged with a base and equipable rocket launcher) and a mini bust, which were released alongside several other Resident Evil-based merchandise. Moby Dick released its own line of Resident Evil action figures bundled in pairs of a playable character and enemy. Included in the series were Nemesis's first and second form, with the first form featuring an alternate head and equipable rocket launcher. Each set additionally includes a part of an action figure of Nemesis's third form, which measures 24 inches (60 cm) long when completed. In 2019, a minted icon 9-inch plush depicting Nemesis was also made. In 2022, Numskull made a 10.9" collectible figurine of Nemesis, based on his appearance in the remake. In 2024, the character was featured in Resident Evil-themed attractions at Universal Studios Japan.

Concept art of Nemesis for the Resident Evil 3 remake.

Following the game's debut in 1999, the Nemesis became one of the most recognizable and popular characters in the Resident Evil series. G4's Filter named the Nemesis one of the top ten video game villains of all time as selected by viewers, placing fifth on the list. 1UP.com named the battle against the Nemesis one of the "25 of the Most Badass Boss Fights of All Time", saying "There are plenty of bosses worth mentioning from the Resident Evil series... but the one that to this day most people point to as the biggest badass of the bunch is Nemesis [sic]". GameSpot featured Nemesis in a "Reader's Choice" edition of their "Top 10 Video Game Villains" article and noting the character's high popularity among fans when compared to the Tyrant. Dave Meikleham of GamesRadar described Nemesis as the "deadliest villain in the history of survival horror", comparing him to another fictional character the terminator and adding "Resident Evil 3 is undoubtedly defined by its iconic villain". Patrick Gill of Polygon said Nemesis moves in a menacing manner, but the worst part is to watch his "nasty trash face". He also stated he's frightening and defended how you lose him while catching up to you. Aaron Potter of Den of Geek named Nemesis as second of their "Best Resident Evil Bosses and Monsters", stating that "He becomes more deformed the longer Resident Evil 3’s campaign progresses, too, making each fight feel scarier than the last." In 2021, Alex Aniel in the book Itchy, Tasty: An Unofficial History of Resident Evil described Nemesis as an icon fondly remembered for his aggressiveness and terrifying personality, and further noted him as a popular subject for fandom convention cosplay.

While IGN described Nemesis as one of the best Resident Evil bosses and one of their favorite video game monsters of all time, they noted disdain for his film counterpart, stating "little of what made us love Nemesis made it through to his film incarnation. As it runs out, a man in a rubber suit isn't half as scary as a well-crafted collection of polygons." Michael Kennedy of Screen Rant shared similar sentiments, describing him as the "coolest of the bunch" in terms of game series adversaries, but added that the film ruined the character and "Making Nemesis a good guy was an absolutely terrible decision, and understandably elicited a collective groan from fans of the Resident Evil games." While Trace Thurman of Bloody Disgusting noted Nemesis "looks awesome and is a total badass" in the film, he shared similar disdain for the character's heroic turn in the finale, exclaiming "Why would you take the biggest and baddest Resident Evil villain and neuter him?"

On the other hand, Nemesis in the Resident Evil 3 remake has received mixed reception from critics. Hirun Cryer of Eurogamer criticized and described Nemesis's "large fangs and smooshed nose" as "cartoonish". Ben Tyrer of GamesRadar downplayed Nemesis's appearance and stated that "Resident Evil 3's main villain has lost his fear factor," while Andy Kelly of PC Gamer described Nemesis as "giant and terrifying stalker in town". Kirk McKeand of VG247 explained that Nemesis is only active in a small portion of the game, and he is mainly featured in scripted sequences or boss fights. This led some critics to believe that he was underused and most of his potential was wasted, with Electronic Gaming Monthly's Mollie Patterson stating "[if] you were hoping for him to dial up the danger, you may feel some disappointment." Red Bull called Nemesis in the remake one of the scariest video game villains of all time, stating "You cannot kill him, you cannot stop him. At best you can run away and even that isn't always effective", and noting this aspect was enhanced by his increased mobility options in the remake.
