= Resident Evil: Resistance =

2020 video game

- Developer: NeoBards Entertainment
- Publisher: Capcom
- Director: Al Yang
- Producer: Albert Lee
- Designers: Capra Shih; Kaiyu Chang
- Programmers: Edward Chen; Rachel Wu
- Artist: Julien Proux
- Composer: Jeff Broadbent
- Series: Resident Evil
- Engine: RE Engine
- Platforms: PlayStation 4; Windows; Xbox One
- Release: April 3, 2020
- Genre: Survival horror
- Mode: Multiplayer

Resident Evil: Resistance (Note: Known in Japan as Biohazard: Resistance (Japanese: バイオハザード レジスタンス, Hepburn: Baiohazādo Rejisutansu)) is a 2020 asymmetrical survival horror game developed by NeoBards Entertainment and published by Capcom as the online component for Resident Evil 3. Released for PlayStation 4, Windows, and Xbox One, it involves four survivor players competing against a mastermind player who can create traps, enemies and other hazards. Resistance is set during the Raccoon City outbreak and features characters from Resident Evil 2, Resident Evil 3, Resident Evil 5 and Resident Evil: Revelations 2, though it is a non-canon scenario. The game received mixed reviews from critics, who criticized it for being unbalanced, having technical issues and lacking dedicated servers.

== Gameplay ==
Resident Evil: Resistance features twelve playable characters as seven survivors and five masterminds. The game puts a team of four survivor players against a mastermind player who can create traps, enemies, and other hazards. Players can choose seven levels: Downtown, Uptown, Casino, Prison, Research Facilty, Abandoned Park and Bemusement Park to compete in three challenges during a time limit. Resistance's gameplay is similar to Resident Evil Outbreak (2003).

=== Plot ===
In September 1998, Umbrella Corporation kidnapped civilians during the Raccoon City outbreak, bringing them to the "NEST2" facility, where employees force citizens they infected to prove the effectiveness of the T-Virus Project.

=== Survivors ===
- Samuel Jordan (voiced by Clayton Froning/Shōgo Batori) - An injured boxer who signed up for Umbrella's medical trial. He can punch enemies.
- Valerie Harmon (voiced by Alex Ryan/Hitomi Suzuki) - An intern at NEST2 and a chemistry student of Raccoon University who investigated her roommate's memory problems. She can detect the location of items.
- Tyrone Henry (voiced by John Eric Bentley/Ryūnosuke Watanuki) - A firefighter of the Raccoon Fire Department who responded to a fire at an Umbrella facility. He can kick enemies.
- January Van Sant (voiced by Melanie Minichino/Ai Kaneda) - A hacker who was sent by a reporter to find information on Umbrella and the Raccoon Police Department. She can disable cameras.
- Becca Woolett (voiced by Tara Sands/Natsu Yorita) - A park ranger from the Arklay Mountains. She can use firearms for critical hits.
- Martin Sandwich (voiced by Nicolas Roye/Taiki Terai) - A mechanic who unintentionally found NEST2 underneath Spencer Memorial Hospital. He can set mines.
- Jill Valentine (voiced by Nicole Tompkins/Atsuko Yuya) - An officer of the Raccoon Police Department's Special Tactics And Rescue Service (S.T.A.R.S.) unit who was trying to escape Raccoon City. She can dodge enemy attacks.

=== Masterminds ===
- Daniel Fabron (voiced by Kaiser Johnson/Hiroshi Shirokuma) - An intelligence division member who eliminates threats to Umbrella. He can summon Mr. X.
- Alex Wesker (voiced by Mary Elizabeth McGlynn/Rika Fukami) - A chief researcher who works for Ozwell E. Spencer. She can summon Yateveo.
- Annette Birkin (voiced by Karen Strassman/Marika Hayashi) - A virologist who contributed to the G-Virus research. She can summon G-Birkin.
- Ozwell E. Spencer (voiced by Time Winters/Issei Futamata) - One of the founders of Umbrella who is searching for immortality. He can use an energy field to trap survivors.
- Nicholai Ginovaef (voiced by Neil Newbon/Kenta Miyake) - A mercenary sergeant of Umbrella's Biohazard Countermeasure Service (U.B.C.S.). He can summon Nemesis.

== Development and release ==
Resistance is the first project developed by NeoBards Entertainment. Although the studio was formed in 2017, many of its staff members had previously worked on various projects with Capcom, including Onimusha: Warlords. Development of the game started in 2017 by a team of roughly 120 people, who were based in two offices in Taipei and Suzhou. The idea of having a mastermind player using security cameras to view survivor players was inspired by the fixed camera angles of the first Resident Evil games. The game runs on Capcom's proprietary RE Engine. It was announced at the 2019 Tokyo Game Show as Project Resistance. A beta was released on Steam and PlayStation 4 on March 31, 2020.

Resistance was bundled with the Resident Evil 3 remake and released on April 3, 2020 because Capcom felt that Resident Evil 3 on its own does not have as much content as the Resident Evil 2 remake. Capcom supported the game with additional updates and downloadable content until July 2020. These include the option for survivor players to play as Jill Valentine and a new costume pack which allows survivor players to dress up as Leon S. Kennedy and Claire Redfield from the Resident Evil 2 remake. Another update introduced the character of Nicholai Ginovaef as a mastermind, allowing players to summon and control Nemesis. Nicholai had been considered a candidate since the early stages of development. A patch that focused on balance adjustments was released on June 19, 2020. Support for the game ended with the final patch released on October 8, 2020.

== Reception ==
Reception

Aggregate scores
Aggregator	Score
Metacritic	64/100
OpenCritic	32% recommend

Review scores
Publication	Score
IGN	6/10
Shacknews	6/10
Wccftech	5/10

Resistance received "mixed or average reviews" from critics, according to the review aggregation website Metacritic. Fellow review aggregator OpenCritic assessed that the game received weak approval, being recommended by 32% of critics. IGN criticized the game for being unbalanced and for lacking visual diversity. Shacknews criticized the game's poor connection quality because it does not have its own dedicated servers. Instead, the player who plays as the mastermind is the host of the game, resulting in the survivor players being at the mercy of the quality of the mastermind's connection. A large number of technical issues were also identified, which were said to make the game almost unplayable. Stutter and the fact it takes almost three seconds for enemies to react after being shot were highlighted as some of the most common issues. Wccftech editor Nathan Birch criticized the game's inclusion of microtransactions and loot boxes.
