= RE3 (disambiguation) =

RE3 or RE 3 could refer to:

- Resident Evil 3: Nemesis, a video game
- the Rhein-Emscher-Express (RE 3), a rail service in Germany
- the RegioExpress route RE3, a rail service in Switzerland
- RE3, a chassis code for Honda CR-V (third generation)

== See also ==
- Resident Evil 3 (disambiguation)
