= DC Comics: Anatomy of a Metahuman =

Graphic novel

- Authors: S.D. Perry; Matthew K. Manning
- Illustrator: Ming Doyle
- Subject: Superheroes
- Publisher: Insight Editions
- Publication date: September 18, 2018
- Pages: 160
- ISBN: 978-1608875016

DC Comics: Anatomy of a Metahuman is a graphic novel featuring characters appearing in American comic books published by DC Comics. The book, written by S. D. Perry and Matthew K. Manning with art by Ming Doyle, is presented as a collection of files created by Batman detailing the characters of the DC Universe's physiologies and abilities. It was published on September 18, 2018 by Insight Editions.

== Premise ==
Anatomy of a Metahuman is a graphic novel presented as a collection of files created by Batman. The files detail the characters of the DC Universe's psychology and abilities, and include Batman's "personal theories" as to how their powers work.

== Composition and publication ==
Anatomy of a Metahuman is written by S. D. Perry and Matthew K. Manning, and illustrated by Ming Doyle. According to editor Chris Prince, the book originated from an idea to create a superhero fiction equivalent to Gray's Anatomy. It took five years to write; production was difficult because Perry and Manning had to combine real-world science with comic book fiction while also creating a compelling Batman story. Doyle announced the book on July 5, 2018, via her Twitter feed and was later published by Insight Editions on September 18.

Perry and Manning drew inspiration from the 1995 Kevin Smith film Mallrats and the personal sketchbook of Guillermo del Toro. Prince said the scenes in Mallrats in which Jason Lee's character discusses how superheroes would work in the real world were a major influence. He also added del Toro's journals—"beautiful, Da Vinci-esque notebooks into which he pours out his creative thoughts"—were something they tried to emulate. Doyle spent a year illustrating the book. Prince was happy with the final book, as he believed it allowed them to explore DC's character roster in a way that had never been done before.
