= Mr. X (Resident Evil) =

Resident Evil character

- Resident Evil character
- Mr. X in Resident Evil 2 (2019)
- First appearance: Resident Evil 2 (1998)
- Created by: Shinji Mikami

In-universe information
- Species: Tyrant

Mr. X is a character and antagonist from the 1998 survival horror video game Resident Evil 2 and its 2019 remake, both part of the Resident Evil franchise created by the Japanese company Capcom. Also known as the T-00 Tyrant (or simply the Tyrant), part of a series of intelligent bioweapons developed by the Umbrella Corporation, Mr. X pursues protagonists Leon S. Kennedy and Claire Redfield for a large portion of the game.

Mr. X is the only Tyrant in the series to wear more standard clothing in the form of a trench coat, and in the remake, a fedora hat. To the surprise of the game's developers, the remake's Mr. X gained "breakout" popularity amongst fans and critics, becoming an Internet meme due to his fear-inspiring implacability and incongruously gentlemanly appearance. Critics praised Mr. X's deep integration into the game's mechanics, as well as the fear factor his constant presence brings to the remake.

== Development ==
Concept art of Mr. X's multiple mutation form

Shinji Mikami is credited with creating Mr. X, also known as T-00, who was an improved version of Resident Evil's T-002 Tyrant. The Tyrants are bioengineered supersoldiers created by Umbrella Corporation, a pharmaceutical company with secret, sinister plans that involve the creation and sale of BOWs, or Bio-Organic Weapons. The basic idea of a trenchcoat-wearing humanoid monster, and a later transformation process, existed from the early stages of Resident Evil 2's development. In the original game, the artificial intelligence of Mr. X was far more basic, and was unable to break through rooms in an unscripted manner. If the player loaded into another section of the game, he would be unable to track down the player.

In the 2019 remake, Mr. X was particularly designed to stalk the protagonist, much like Nemesis in Resident Evil 3 and the Baker family in Resident Evil 7. Ominous music and heavy footsteps increase in volume and intensity the closer he gets to the player. Because of his numerous appearances in different places, some people thought there were multiple Tyrants in existence, but game director Kazunori Kadoi affirmed there was only a single instance of Mr. X. To determine how the character tracked the ingame location of the protagonists, an independent level designer used a noclip camera tool to locate Mr. X, confirming that he could sense the player, but did not "cheat" by using teleportation, instead moving at about four times his standard walk speed when he was not visible to the player.

=== Name ===
A PlayStation Blog post which examined the character noted that some fans know him by the name "Mr. X", while others know him simply as "Tyrant". In the post, Yasuhiro Anpo (the Resident Evil 2 remake's director) clarified that the character's official name is "Tyrant"; he is sometimes referred to as "Mr. X" because his origins and motives are intended to evoke a sense of mystery in the player.

According to Jack Yarwood of Time Extension, the Tyrant's name, "Mr. X", did not appear in the original Resident Evil 2, although it was used in a variety of supplemental materials released as early as 1999. Yarwood speculates that "Mr. X" might have emerged as a translation of various names used in the development team's internal documents. In one of the game's screenplays, the character's initial human-like form was referred to as "Mysterious Man X", (Note: Japanese: 謎の男Ｘ, Hepburn: Nazo no Otoko X) but not in any dialogue; rather, it was used in action descriptions to emphasize the character's mysterious nature. One piece of concept art also named the character "Tyrant X". According to the game's translator, Tom Shiraiwa, the Japanese equivalents of "Mr. X" might have been placeholder names.

== Appearances ==
In the original Resident Evil 2 (1998), Mr. X wore only a trench coat, while in the remake, he also wears a fedora hat. He was dropped into Raccoon City by Umbrella Corporation along with five other T-103 Tyrants during the outbreak of the T-virus, a highly contagious zombifying virus created as a bioweapon. While the others were commanded to engage in a cover-up of the situation, T-00 was given two unique missions: eliminate any survivors in the Raccoon City Police Station, and track down a sample of the G-virus—a mutagenic pathogen enabling immense growth and power—by any means necessary. Leon and Claire discover he is immune to harm from any normal weapon. While being temporarily incapacitated by the impact of a moving van and explosives detonated by Ada Wong, he later recovers before being seemingly killed by William Birkin, a mutated scientist who formerly worked for Umbrella. In Claire's scenario, he is not seen further, while in Leon's scenario, Mr. X is shown to have regenerated again, pursuing Leon into NEST, a secret Umbrella Corporation research facility. When the self-destruct sequence for NEST is triggered, he mutates into a Super Tyrant and attempts to kill Leon once and for all. Ada gives Leon a rocket launcher, allowing him to destroy Mr. X once and for all.

A new Mr. X appears as a boss in Resident Evil Requiem (2026). The villain Zeno summons him to attack Leon, who has returned to the ruins of Raccoon City 28 years after Resident Evil 2. He pursues Leon through the Raccoon City Police Station ruins before the player engages him in a battle outside. Files obtained after the fight reveals that this Mr X was a mass-produced variant sold on the black market after Umbrella's demise.

=== Other appearances ===
Mr. X appears as an enemy in the Cavia-developed light gun shooter Resident Evil: The Darkside Chronicles (2009), and as a playable character in Resident Evil: Resistance (2020), a companion game to Resident Evil 3 (2020). Outside the Resident Evil franchise, Mr. X appears in Monster Hunter: World (2018), PUBG Mobile (2018), and Puzzle & Survival (2023).

== Reception ==
Due to his implacability and appearance, Mr. X became popular among reviewers and fans. Alex Donaldson of VG247 dubbed Mr. X a "perfect panic-inducing enemy", also praising its excellent implementation, persistent danger, and ability to turn the game into a horrific experience. Eurogamer's Wesley Yin-Poole lauded Mr. X and called him "wonderfully terrifying." While appreciating his presence, Game Informer's Kyle Hilliard despised him frequently for his recurring irritability, silliness, and frightening moments. Aaron Potter of Den of Geek and IGN staff named Mr. X as one of the best Resident Evil bosses, with Potter commenting, "You simply have no way of defeating or halting this 7-foot-tall stalker... This endless game of cat and mouse never fails to get the heart pumping, especially since he follows you in real time." Willow Green of Empire described Mr. X as one of the greatest video game characters and stated, "Relentlessly pursuing our heroes, he was designed by Capcom to offer a different kind of opponent from the usual hordes of shuffling dead-heads." According to Patrick Gill of Polygon, some elements of Mr. X can be horrifying even if the character isn't visible on screen but you can hear his ominous footsteps.

Mr. X became an internet meme on Twitter in 2019, one of which featured the 2002 song "X Gon' Give It to Ya" playing when the character appeared onscreen. Fans have additionally created various mods involving Mr. X, including one again playing "X Gon' Give It to Ya" whenever he appears. Another mod, "X No More", removes him from the game entirely and is targeted towards fans who struggle with the difficulty of his presence.
