= NeoBards Entertainment =

Video game development company

NeoBards Entertainment Ltd.
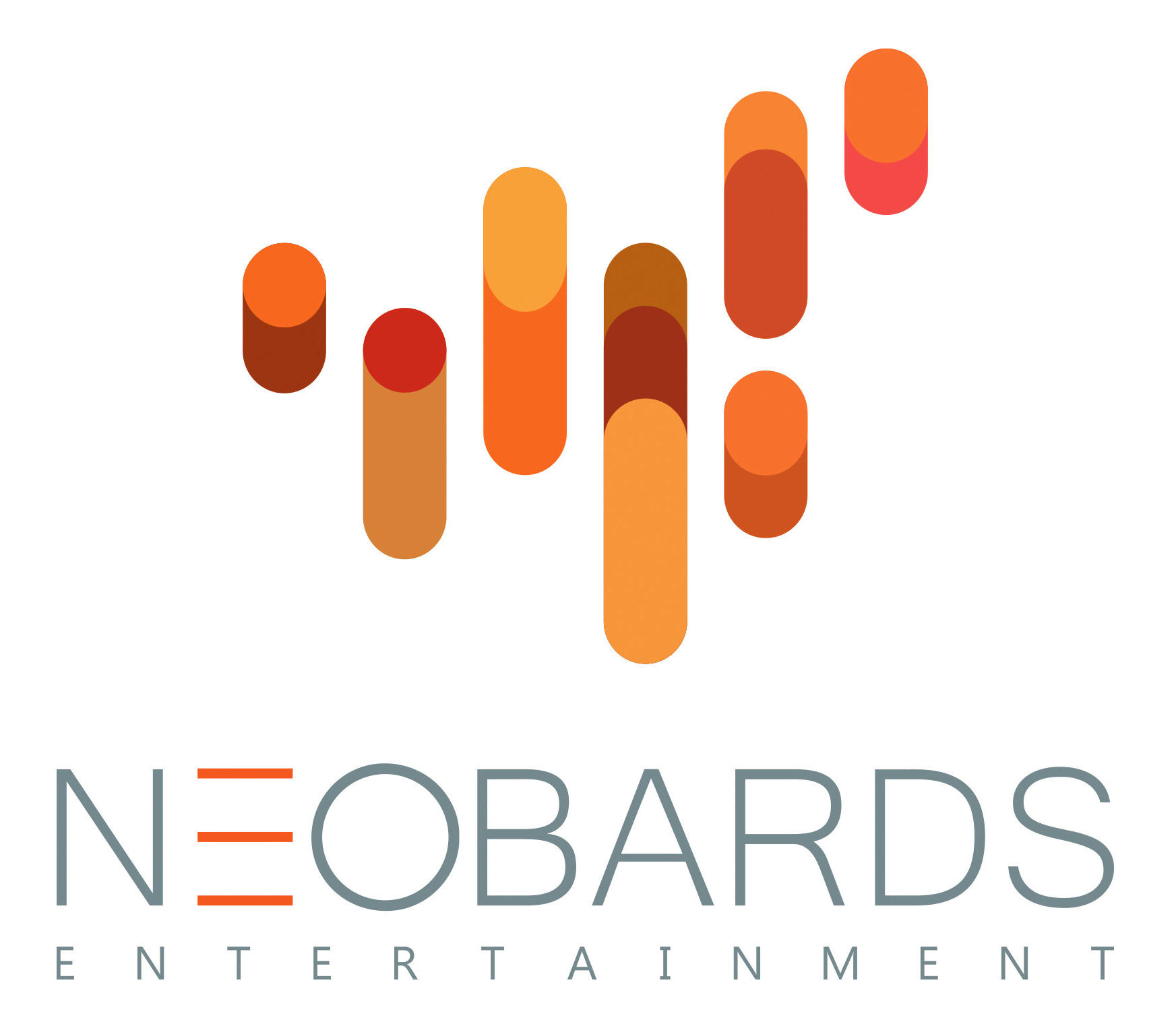
- Native name: 泥巴娛樂股份有限公司
- Type: Private
- Industry: Video games
- Founded: February 15, 2017; 9 years ago
- Headquarters: Hong Kong
- Products: Resident Evil: Resistance; Silent Hill f
- Website: neobards.com

NeoBards Entertainment Ltd. is a Hong Kong video game development company founded on February 15, 2017, with headquarters in Hong Kong and studios in Taipei and Suzhou.

== History ==
On February 15, 2017, NeoBards was established by creators with experience working at and with companies such as Infogrames, Activision, Sony and Square Enix. Since its founding, NeoBards has collaborated with major publishers, especially Capcom, contributing to several remastered titles including Resident Evil Origins Collection, Devil May Cry HD Collection, Onimusha: Warlords and Dead Rising Deluxe Remaster. NeoBards also led the development on Resident Evil: Resistance, taking charge of the full gameplay design.

In addition to its work with Capcom, NeoBards has partnered with other global publishers, including Square Enix (Marvel's Avengers), Nexon (Dynasty Warriors M), and Konami. In 2025, NeoBards was revealed as the developer of Silent Hill f, a new installment in the Silent Hill franchise published by Konami. A behind-the-scenes video was released highlighting the team's collaboration with series producer Motoi Okamoto, writer Ryukishi07, and character designer kera.

== Games developed ==
Year	Title	Development Type	Platform(s)	Publisher(s)
2018	Devil May Cry HD Collection (remastered)	Port	PlayStation 4, Xbox One, Microsoft Windows	Capcom
2019	Onimusha: Warlords	Remaster	PlayStation 4, Xbox One, Nintendo Switch, Microsoft Windows	Capcom
2019	Resident Evil Origins Collection	Port	Nintendo Switch	Capcom
2020	Resident Evil: Resistance	Lead development	PlayStation 4, Xbox One, Microsoft Windows	Capcom
2020	No Straight Roads	Port	Nintendo Switch	Sold Out
2022	Resident Evil 2, Resident Evil 3, Resident Evil 7: Biohazard (remastered)	Remaster	PlayStation 5, Xbox Series X/S, Microsoft Windows	Capcom
2022	Resident Evil Re:Verse	Lead development	PlayStation 4, Xbox One, Microsoft Windows	Capcom
2023	Mega Man Battle Network Legacy Collection	Remaster	PlayStation 4, Nintendo Switch, Microsoft Windows	Capcom
2023	Dynasty Warriors M	Lead development	Android, iOS	Nexon
2024	Dead Rising Deluxe Remaster	Remaster	PlayStation 5, Xbox Series X/S, Microsoft Windows	Capcom
2025	Silent Hill f	Lead development	PlayStation 5, Xbox Series X/S, Microsoft Windows	Konami
