= Ming Doyle =

American comic book illustrator (born 1984)

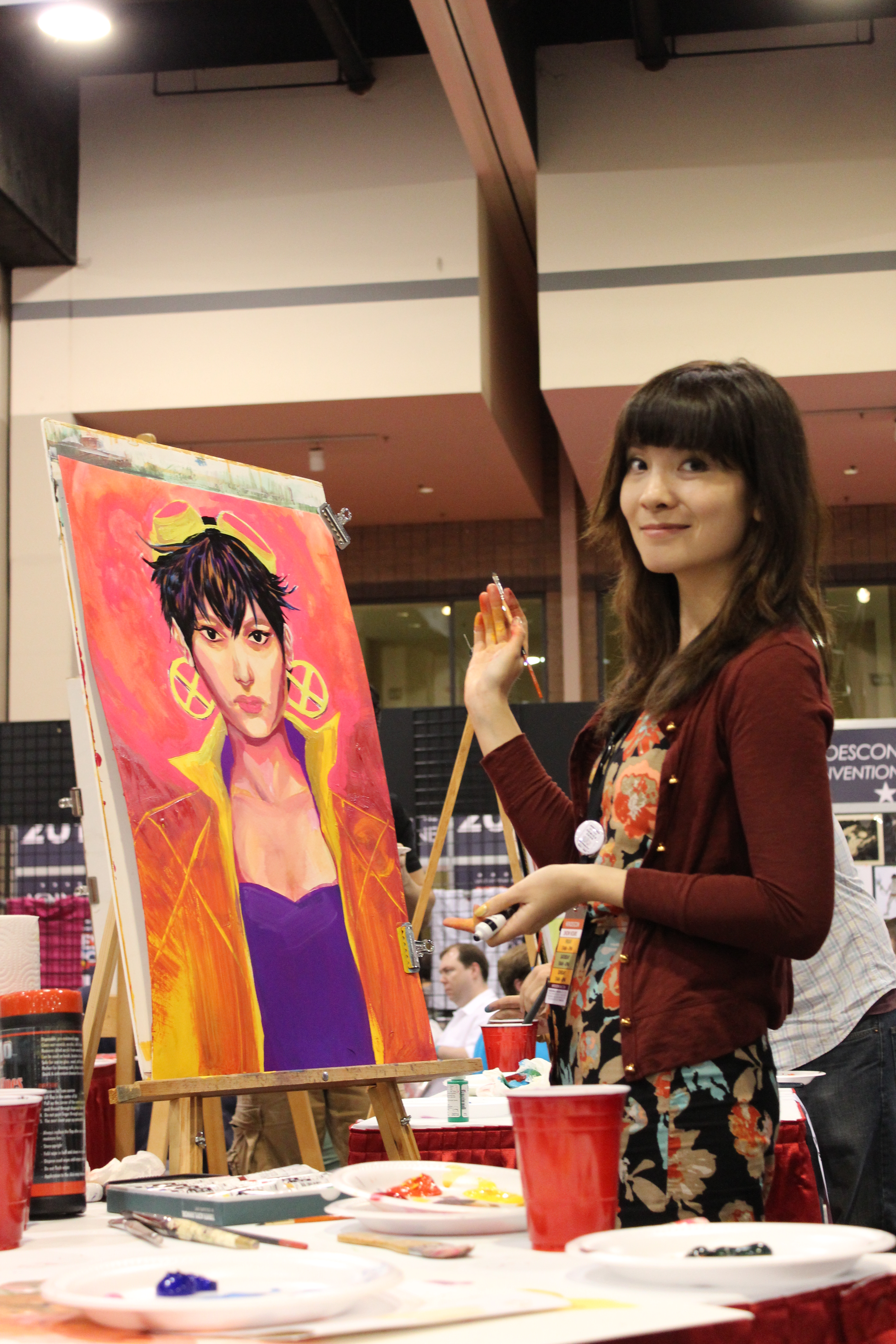
- Doyle at HeroesCon 2013
- Born: 1984 (age 41–42); Boston, Massachusetts, USA
- Education: Cornell University
- Known for: Comics illustration
- Notable work: Anatomy of a Metahuman, Constantine: The Hellblazer, Two Graves
- Spouse: Neil Cicierega (m. 2015)
- Children: 1
- Website: http://www.mingdoyle.com/

Ming Doyle (born 1984) is an American comic book illustrator and writer. Her works, including Anatomy of a Metahuman, have been published by Marvel Comics, DC Comics, and Candlewick Press.

Multiversity Comics praised Doyle's work for its "heavily lined, brushed inks" and the "sense of awe" it creates by "showing superheroics in an otherwise rather realistic setting".

== Early and personal life ==
Ming Doyle was born in Boston in 1984 to an Irish-American sailor and a Chinese Canadian librarian.

In 2007, she graduated from Cornell University with a dual concentration BFA in painting and drawing.

On August 8, 2015, Doyle married musician and comedian Neil Cicierega, with whom she lives in Somerville, Massachusetts. Their daughter was born in March 2018.

== Career ==
Aside from Marvel, DC, and Candlewick, Doyle's workplaces have included Boom! Studios, Image Comics, Tokyopop, Valiant Comics, and Dark Horse Comics.

She describes her 2011 work, Tantalize, as her first full-length graphic novel.

DC universe magician John Constantine's series was relaunched as Constantine: The Hellblazer, written by Doyle and James Tynion IV in June 2015.

The Mary Sue interviewed Doyle in 2015 at Boston Comic Con. She described her life as a freelancer and stated that her dream projects include creating comics about Anne Rice’s Vampire Chronicles; Namor; and Gambit.

In 2018, Doyle illustrated the 160-page DC Comics: Anatomy of a Metahuman, written by S. D. Perry and Matthew K. Manning.

In 2023, she contributed to Two Graves, "the first volume of a new series from writer Genevieve Valentine and illustrated by Annie Wu and Ming Doyle". It was published by Simon & Schuster and also included essays by N.K. Jemisin, Veronica Schanoes, and Stephanie Lai.

== See also ==
- List of comics creators
- List of illustrators
