= S. D. Perry =

American science fiction and horror writer

- Born: Stephani Danelle Perry; March 14, 1970 (age 56)
- Citizenship: United States
- Relatives: Steve Perry (father)
- Writing career
- Pen name: S. D. Perry, Stephani Perry
- Language: English
- Years active: 1993–present
- Genres: Science fiction, military science fiction, horror fiction

Stephani Danelle Perry (born March 14, 1970) is an American science fiction and horror writer, publishing works as S. D. Perry and Stephani Perry. She has contributed tie-in works to several long-running franchises, including Resident Evil, Star Trek, Aliens, and Predator.

== Personal life ==
Her father is television and science fiction writer Steve Perry.

Perry, who prefers the name Danelle, lives in Portland, Oregon with her family.

== Bibliography ==
- ^ Credited as by Stephani Perry
- † Indicates a hardcover release.

Title	Publisher	Date	ISBN	Notes
Timecop	Berkley Books	September 1994	0-425-14652-9	Novelization of Timecop (1994) film.
Virus	Tor Books	August 1998	0-812-54158-8	Novelization of Virus (1999) film.
Wonder Woman	Pocket Star	December 30, 2008	978-1-4165-9873-2	Novelization of Wonder Woman (2009) animated film.; Co-written with Britta Dennison.
The Summer Man	47North	May 7, 2013	978-1-61109-916-4	Original novel
Path of the Apocalypse	Titan Books	September 18, 2018	978-1-78565-992-8	Based on Shadow of the Tomb Raider (2018) video game.
Anatomy of a Metahuman †	DC Comics	September 18, 2018	978-1-60887-501-6	Co-written with Matthew Manning.; Illustrated by Ming Doyle
Amargosa	Self-published	October 21, 2024		Original novel published only in e-book format.

=== Short fiction (1991–2017) ===
Anthology	Editor(s)	Publisher	Date	ISBN
Pulphouse, Issue 11 † – "The Key" ^	Kristine Kathryn Rusch	Pulphouse Publishing	September 1991	—
Magic: The Gathering – Tapestries – "Inheritance"	Kathy Ice	HarperPrism	July 1995	0-06-105308-2
SNAFU: Survival of the Fittest – "Badlands"	Geoff Brown and Amanda J. Spedding	Cohesion Press	August 22, 2015	978-0-9943029-3-9
Predator: If it Bleeds – "Skeld's Keep"	Bryan Thomas Schmidt	Titan Books	October 17, 2017	978-1-78565-540-1

=== Aliens (1993–2016) ===
No.	Title	Publisher	Date	ISBN	Notes
1	The Female War ^	Bantam Books	July 1993	0-553-56159-6	Co-written with Steve Perry.
2	Labyrinth	Bantam Books	March 1996	0-553-57491-4	
3	Berserker	Bantam Books	August 1998	0-553-57731-X	
	Criminal Enterprise	DH Press	January 29, 2008	978-1-59582-003-7	Novel is not numbered.
	The Weyland Yutani Report †	Titan Books	October 30, 2014 (French); April 26, 2016 (English)	978-1-78329-352-0	Illustrated guidebook.

=== Aliens vs. Predator (1994) ===
No.	Title	Publisher	Date	ISBN	Notes
1	Prey ^	Bantam Books	May 1994	0-553-56555-9	Co-written with Steve Perry.
3	War ^	Bantam Books	December 1994	0-553-57732-8	

=== Resident Evil (1998–2004) ===
No.	Title	Publisher	Date	ISBN	Notes
1	The Umbrella Conspiracy	Pocket Books	October 1998	0-671-02439-6	Novelization of Resident Evil (1996) video game.
2	Caliban Cove	Pocket Books	October 1998	0-671-02440-X	Original novel.
3	City of the Dead	Pocket Books	May 1999	0-671-02441-8	Novelization of Resident Evil 2 (1998) video game.
4	Underworld	Pocket Books	May 1999	0-671-02442-6	Original novel.
5	Nemesis	Pocket Books	October 2000	0-671-78496-X	Novelization of Nemesis (1999).
6	Code: Veronica	Pocket Books	November 27, 2001	0-671-78498-6	Novelization of Code: Veronica (2000) video game.
0 (Note: Published as Resident Evil, Book 0. A reference to the video game's Japanese title, biohazard 0 (Japanese: バイオハザード0, Hepburn: baiohazādo zero).)	Zero Hour	Pocket Books	October 26, 2004	0-671-78511-7	Novelization of Resident Evil Zero (2002) video game.

=== Star Trek (2001–2010) ===
Title	Publisher	Date	ISBN	Notes
The Lives of Dax (anthology) – "Allegro Ouroboros in D Minor", with Robert Simpson – "Sins of the Mother"	Pocket Books	December 1999	0-671-02840-5	Edited by Marco Palmieri.
Cloak (Section 31, Book 3)	Pocket Books	June 26, 2001	0-671-77471-9	
Avatar, Book 1 (Deep Space Nine)	Pocket Books	May 1, 2001	0-7434-0050-X	
Avatar, Book 2 (Deep Space Nine)	Pocket Books	May 1, 2001	0-7434-0051-8	
Rising Son (Deep Space Nine)	Pocket Books	December 31, 2002	0-7434-4838-3	
Unity † (Deep Space Nine)	Pocket Books	November 18, 2003	0-7434-4840-5	
Night of the Wolves (Terok Nor, Book 2)	Pocket Books	April 29, 2008	978-0-7434-8251-6	Co-written with Britta Dennison.
Dawn of the Eagles (Terok Nor, Book 3)	Pocket Books	May 20, 2008	978-0-7434-8252-3	Co-written with Britta Dennison.
Inception (The Original Series)	Pocket Books	January 26, 2010	978-0-7434-8250-9	Co-written with Britta Dennison.

=== Uncharted ===
Uncharted (2022)
