= Resident Evil 3 (2020 video game) =

Video game remake

- Cover art depicting Jill Valentine, Carlos Oliveira, and Nemesis
- Developer: Capcom (Note: With additional work and development support from K2 Inc, M-Two, and Redworks)
- Publisher: Capcom
- Directors: Kiyohiko Sakata; Yasuhiro Seto; Yasuhiro Anpo; Yukio Ando
- Producers: Masachika Kawata; Peter Fabiano
- Designers: Masanori Komine; Takashi Ishihara
- Programmer: Go Azawa
- Artists: Cho Yonghee; Yuka Chi
- Writer: Yasuhiro Seto
- Composers: Kota Suzuki; Azusa Kato; (Note: Additional composers are Masami Ueda, Takayasu Sodeoka and Kento Hasegawa)
- Series: Resident Evil
- Engine: RE Engine
- Platforms: PlayStation 4; Windows; Xbox One; PlayStation 5; Xbox Series X/S; Amazon Luna; Nintendo Switch; iOS; iPadOS; macOS; Nintendo Switch 2
- Release: PS4, Windows, Xbox One; April 3, 2020; Amazon Luna; June 10, 2022; PS5, Xbox Series X/S; June 13, 2022; Nintendo Switch; November 18, 2022 iOS, iPadOS, macOS; March 18, 2025; Nintendo Switch 2 October 16, 2026
- Genre: Survival horror
- Mode: Single-player

Resident Evil 3 (Note: Known in Japan as Biohazard RE:3 (Japanese: バイオハザード RE:3, Hepburn: Baiohazādo Āru Ī Surī) and commonly referred to as Resident Evil 3 Remake) is a 2020 survival horror game developed and published by Capcom. It is a remake of the 1999 game Resident Evil 3: Nemesis. Players control former S.T.A.R.S police officer Jill Valentine and mercenary Carlos Oliveira as they attempt to find a vaccine and escape from a city during a zombie outbreak. The game is played from a third-person perspective and requires the player to defeat monsters and solve puzzles while being pursued by an engineered mutant called the Nemesis. It was released for PlayStation 4, Windows, and Xbox One in April 2020 and for Amazon Luna, PlayStation 5, and Xbox Series X/S in June 2022, with a Nintendo Switch cloud version released in November 2022. The Apple version (iOS, iPadOS, macOS) was released in March 2025, and a version for Nintendo Switch 2 was released in October 2026.

Most of Resident Evil 3 was developed concurrently with the 2019 remake of Resident Evil 2; both games run on Capcom's RE Engine. Although it features the same premise as the original, many parts were rearranged or removed in favor of a more focused story. To reflect the more action-oriented approach of the original, developers revamped the movement speed and animations from the Resident Evil 2 remake and added the ability to dodge attacks. Because some features from the original game were excluded, a separate online multiplayer game, Resident Evil: Resistance, was bundled with Resident Evil 3.

The game received generally favorable reviews from critics, who praised its compelling narrative, tense atmosphere and graphics. Criticism was targeted at its short length and substantial amount of missing content from the original. The greater emphasis on action and scripted sequences disappointed some critics. The game had sold 14.93 million copies by October 2026.

== Gameplay ==
The player, controlling Jill Valentine from an over-the-shoulder perspective, confronts Nemesis.

Resident Evil 3 is a survival horror third-person shooter game. The player controls Resident Evil protagonist Jill Valentine through most of the game; certain sections require the player to control a supporting character, Carlos Oliveira for short periods. The player must explore the environment to open doors, climb ladders and pick up items. When an item is collected, it is stored in an inventory that can be accessed at any time. Items in the inventory can be used, examined and combined to solve puzzles and gain access to areas that were previously inaccessible. The player may pick up maps to reveal unexplored sections in the game's automap, which shows the player's current position and indicates if an area still has items to collect. Cutscenes with occasional quick time events are featured at regular intervals to advance the story.

As the player progresses through the game, a variety of computer-controlled monsters will try to hinder the player's progress. The player can acquire and use multiple weapons, including combat knives, firearms, and grenades. Some weapons can be customized with additional parts to improve their performance. A creature called Nemesis is the game's primary antagonist and pursues the player in key moments. He gradually mutates into more aggressive forms as the player defeats him during several encounters. The player has a certain amount of health which decreases when Jill or Carlos takes damage. On higher difficulty settings, ammunition and health recovery items are scarce, and getting past opponents without killing them is generally encouraged. Jill has the ability to dodge incoming attacks at close range, while Carlos can perform melee attacks to stagger opponents. If Jill or Carlos dies, the player must start the game again from the last save point.

Once the player completes the game on the highest difficulty setting, two additional difficulty modes can be unlocked. These disable autosaves, make opponents tougher to defeat, change certain encounters, and rearrange item locations. Additionally, upon completing the game for the first time, an item shop is unlocked in the game's main menu, allowing the player to spend points on in-game advantages such as new weapons and items that boost the player's healing and damage. Points are earned by completing a number of challenges, ranging from finding all weapon upgrades to destroying hidden bobbleheads known as Charlie dolls. Unlocking items is essential to completing the game's most challenging difficulty modes.

== Plot ==
On September 28, 1998, 24 hours prior to the events of Resident Evil 2, most of Raccoon City's citizens have turned into zombies as the result of an outbreak of the T-virus, a mutagenic virus secretly developed by the pharmaceutical company Umbrella. Jill Valentine, former member of the Raccoon Police Department's Special Tactics And Rescue Service (S.T.A.R.S.), is attacked in her apartment by an intelligent bioweapon known as the Nemesis T-Type, specifically programmed by Umbrella to eliminate all surviving S.T.A.R.S. members. Briefly joined by fellow S.T.A.R.S. officer Brad Vickers before he is killed by zombies, Jill evades Nemesis and is rescued by Umbrella Biohazard Countermeasure Service (U.B.C.S.) mercenary Carlos Oliveira. Carlos explains that he and his group of surviving U.B.C.S. mercenaries - Mikhail Victor, Tyrell Patrick, and Nicholai Ginovaef - have set up subway trains to evacuate civilians from the city. Jill helps them reactivate power to the subway and departs on a train with Nicholai and Mikhail, while Carlos and Tyrell remain behind to find Dr. Nathaniel Bard, an Umbrella scientist who may have developed a vaccine for the T-virus.

After Mikhail expresses his suspicions toward Nicholai over how their platoon was ambushed by zombies, Nemesis attacks the train and kills the civilians. Nicholai betrays and locks Jill and Mikhail out, and the latter sacrifices himself by detonating an explosive that derails the train. Meanwhile, reaching the police department on the notion that Bard is at the S.T.A.R.S. office, Carlos and Tyrell learn the scientist took refuge at a nearby hospital. Carlos is contacted by Jill, who survived the crash while being pursued by a mutating Nemesis. She manages to escape and defeat Nemesis, but loses consciousness after the monster infects her with the T-virus. Carlos finds Jill half a day later and takes her to the hospital, hoping to find a cure. There, he also learns that Bard was murdered, and a video entry from the scientist reveals that Umbrella's board is wiping out the vaccines and any evidence connecting the company to the T-Virus. After Carlos retrieves Bard's vaccine and administers it to Jill, Tyrell discovers that the U.S. government plans to destroy Raccoon City in a missile strike to eradicate the T-virus infestation. Carlos travels to a lab underneath the hospital to find more vaccines, while Tyrell tries to contact whomever he can to prevent the missile strike.

Jill wakes on the day of the missile strike, October 1, and follows Carlos to the lab. Tyrell informs her that the U.S. government will not launch the missiles if they can retrieve a vaccine from the lab within a few hours. Although Nemesis kills Tyrell shortly afterward, Jill manages to synthesize a vaccine. She also learns that Nicholai is a supervisor hired by an unknown contractor to sabotage Umbrella's efforts to hide their involvement while collecting combat data on the company's bioweapons, including Nemesis. An encounter with Nemesis prompts Nicholai to retrieve the vaccine from Jill as he leaves her to fight the monster. Jill eliminates Nemesis with a railgun and confronts Nicholai on a helipad. Nicholai destroys the vaccine, acknowledging that the city's fate is not important as long as he gets paid for sabotaging Umbrella. Carlos intervenes and restrains Nicholai, prompting Jill to shoot and injure the man. Disgusted by his greed, Jill escapes the city with Carlos via helicopter, leaving Nicholai behind. As the city is destroyed by the missile strike, Jill vows to take down Umbrella at all costs.

== Development ==
Resident Evil 3 was developed by Capcom as a remake of the original Resident Evil 3: Nemesis, which was released for PlayStation in 1999. The idea of producing such a remake was considered shortly after Capcom had started development on the 2019 remake of Resident Evil 2. Because Capcom had previously remastered the 2002 remake of the original Resident Evil in 2015, completing the trilogy became part of their goal. Capcom was assisted by subsidiary K2 Inc and external companies Red Works and M-Two, the latter being founded by former PlatinumGames CEO Tatsuya Minami. PlatinumGames veteran Kiyohiko Sakata, who had originally worked on the first four Resident Evil games as a programmer and designer, was the game's director. While development on Resident Evil 3 and the Resident Evil 2 remake did not start at the same time, there was a significant development overlap between both projects. As a result, both games share certain technologies and run on Capcom's proprietary RE Engine.

Some people who had worked on the original game were involved in the project and had an opportunity to rebuild their vision of what Raccoon City should look like. Because Resident Evil 3 takes place almost concurrently with the events of Resident Evil 2, the development team decided to tie both stories together more than in the originals. Improving the pace of the story and developing better characterizations, especially the relationship between Jill and Carlos, were a major priority. The team wanted Jill to be resilient and capable of surviving nearly impossible odds, while Carlos was designed to feel like her true ally. Their outfits were altered accordingly, with Jill wearing more practical apparel and Carlos sporting a grittier look. Capcom used the likeness of Russian model Sasha Zotova as the basis for Jill's facial appearance. To honor the more action-oriented approach of the original game, the team revamped the movement speed and animations from the Resident Evil 2 remake, and included a counter action which allows the player to automatically aim at an opponent's head after dodging an attack.

The process of designing Nemesis went through several iterations. Although the art team made sure the new character model stayed true to the original concept, they redesigned it so that it could fit into a reimagined and photorealistic setting. One of the most notable changes from the original design is the fact that he now wears bodybags instead of clothes. According to the game's director, Kiyohiko Sakata, this aesthetic choice was made to show that "Nemesis is not a completed model, but a prototype." In an interview with PlayStation Blog, Sakata further explained that Nemesis's new attire was meant to be "restrictive gear that was haphazardly, quickly created to contain it, which is why it has such visuals." The game's producer, Peter Fabiano, further noted that the redesign was a way for the remake to "keep to the essence of the original game, but at the same time modernize it." Sakata initially wanted Nemesis to actively look for and stalk the player throughout the game, but after he saw that the Resident Evil 2 team was programming the Tyrant in their game to behave in this way, he realized that players that are familiar with Resident Evil 2 would not be surprised by his game's enemy. As a result, the team improved the artificial intelligence of Nemesis so that he could use weapons, grab Jill with his tentacles, and jump long distances to appear right next to her. The team wanted to give players the feeling that they were constantly being pursued by a relentless opponent, but they also wanted to give players periods of respite and make them believe that Jill could defeat him.

Although Resident Evil 3 features the same premise as the original game, many parts were rearranged, especially when compared to the Resident Evil 2 remake, and several locations from the original were cut—namely, the clock tower, the graveyard, the park, and city hall. Conversely, the game's storytelling and dialogue were expanded significantly because Sakata wanted to tell a more consistent story. In particular, Carlos has a more prominent role. The original game's multiple endings and live choices, which affect how the story unfolds, were entirely removed in favor of a more focused story. Additionally, the Mercenaries - Operation: Mad Jackal mode, which involves the player trying to escape the city within a time limit, was excluded from the remake. However, Capcom decided that Resident Evil 3 would be bundled with Resident Evil: Resistance, a separate online multiplayer game developed by a Taiwanese company called NeoBards. Around 90% of the game was complete by January 2020, with the remaining work to be done being final adjustments. The game's overall development time took three years to complete.

== Marketing and release ==
Resident Evil 3 was officially announced during Sony's State of Play livestream presentation on December 10, 2019, shortly after development on the game had been hinted by several sources. A tease referencing the game was then added to the Resident Evil 2 remake via an update, awarding players with an achievement if they found and read an in-game letter left behind by Jill. A demo was released on March 19, 2020, allowing players to play a small portion of the full game before its release, while a new trailer that focused on Jill was released on March 27, 2020. If the game was pre-ordered at certain retailers, players would receive an exclusive downloadable content pack that included Jill's original outfit and Carlos' original hairstyle.

Resident Evil 3 was released for PlayStation 4, Windows, and Xbox One on April 3, 2020. A launch trailer was also released, reminding buyers that Resident Evil: Resistance is freely included in the package with every purchase of the game. A collector's edition was made available for the console versions, featuring extras such as a Jill Valentine figurine, a hardcover art book, a Raccoon City map poster, and a two-disc soundtrack. In Europe, physical copies of the game were reported to likely be delayed because of the COVID-19 pandemic. A board game based on Resident Evil 3 was released by Capcom on April 28, 2020, supporting up to four players and featuring a 19-hour campaign with an overarching storyline. A downloadable content pack that allows players to unlock Jill's S.T.A.R.S costume and items from the in-game shop without the need of completing challenges was released in August 2020.

Versions for PlayStation 5 and Xbox Series X/S were announced on March 2, 2022, and released digitally on June 13, 2022 alongside upgrades for Resident Evil 7: Biohazard and the Resident Evil 2 remake. These versions include visual enhancements including ray-tracing and high-framerate modes, with the PlayStation 5 version also supporting haptic feedback and adaptive triggers. Owners of the game on PlayStation 4 and Xbox One are able to upgrade for free, and a free upgrade patch for the Windows version was released simultaneously. A version for Amazon Luna was announced on May 26, 2022, and was released on June 10, 2022. A Nintendo Switch cloud version was released on November 18, 2022. In 2025, a iOS, iPadOS, and macOS version was released. A Nintendo Switch 2 version was announced during the September 2026 installment of Nintendo Direct and was released digitally on October 16, 2026 alongside ports of the Resident Evil 2 and Resident Evil 4 remakes, with a physical version following in January 2027.

== Reception ==
Reception

Aggregate scores
Aggregator	Score
Metacritic	(PC) 77/100 (PS4) 79/100 (XONE) 84/100
OpenCritic	73% recommend

Review scores
Publication	Score
Destructoid	8/10
Edge	6/10
Electronic Gaming Monthly	4/5
Famitsu	9/10, 9/10, 9/10, 9/10
Game Informer	9/10
GameRevolution	4/5
GameSpot	6/10
GamesRadar+	4/5
IGN	9/10
PC Gamer (US)	58/100
VG247	3/5

Resident Evil 3 received "generally favorable reviews" on Metacritic and a 73% recommendation score on OpenCritic. In a very positive review, IGN considered Resident Evil 3 as strong as its acclaimed predecessor, stating that the game "does an amazing job of recapturing the horror and tension of the late '90s original while completely modernizing its gameplay." Game Informer described it as "an incredible thrill ride" from start to finish. GameRevolution agreed, calling the game short yet exhilarating, and remarked that it exceeds the original in presentation and storytelling. Destructoid noted the "remake of Resident Evil 3 is going to be divisive, just as the original was." Other critics were less enthusiastic towards the game. GameSpot stated that, although the opening hours are very effective, the game fails to sustain the same level of excellence when its scope begins to narrow towards the end. PC Gamer called Resident Evil 3 "an extremely shallow game, with lavish production values failing to mask just how rushed and unambitious it feels."

The game's presentation and visuals were highlighted very positively, with critics praising the detailed and polished environments, tense atmosphere, lighting effects, and interesting and varied locations. Destructoid lauded the remakes character models and aesthetics, stating they add to the sense of dread you feel as you fight through the city piece by piece. IGN praised the storytelling for delivering dramatic moments that carry the gameplay without unnecessary exposition, while Edge magazine said that the game was better written than its predecessor because it knows how to embrace the original's pulpiness while modernizing its characters. Critics also felt that the game had determined and likeable characters, especially Jill and Carlos, who were said to be believable and realistic. The fact that the game often relies on scripted gameplay moments and cinematic set pieces disappointed some critics. VG247 explained that Nemesis is only active in a small portion of the game, and that he is primarily featured in scripted sequences or boss fights. This led some critics to believe that he was underused and that a lot of his potential was wasted.

Critics generally agreed that Resident Evil 3 lacks its predecessor's depth because it places more emphasis on moment-to-moment action than exploration and puzzle solving. However, some noted that the game is far from being as action-heavy as Resident Evil 6, and that it still involves the item micromanagement common to early Resident Evil games. In particular, GamesRadar+ compared the hospital area to the police station of the Resident Evil 2 remake because it requires players to gradually unravel it as they progress. Although the dodge ability was considered a welcome addition, the timing window to execute it was said to be inconsistent. Some critics also considered the combat and gunplay to be less satisfying than that of its predecessor.

A frequently criticized aspect of the game was its short length and lack of substantial replay value. GameSpot explained that the fact that the game follows the same premise as the original but excludes some locations such as the clock tower and park, making its short length even more apparent. GameRevolution said that, although Resident Evil 3 omits some areas from the original, it also introduces and expands others, calling the game more of a reimagining than a genuine remake. Edge argued that the game's short length was not an issue, stating that it is comparable to that of the original game and should take between six and eight hours to complete for the first time. The magazine also remarked that, while the original's multiple endings and live choices certainly encourage subsequent playthroughs, so do the remake's unlockable items that are needed for speedruns, and concluded that Resident Evil 3 is more faithful to the original in spirit than in content.

At The Game Awards 2020, Resident Evil 3 was nominated for Best Audio Design, but lost to The Last of Us Part II. At IGN's Game of the Year Awards 2020, Resident Evil 3 was nominated for Best Action-Adventure Game and Best Remake/Remaster, but lost to The Last of Us Part II and Final Fantasy VII Remake, respectively. It was one of the recipients of the Award for Excellence at the Japan Game Awards 2021.

=== Sales ===
Resident Evil 3 shipped more than two million copies in its first five days, although Capcom stated that nearly half of the game's sales were digital. In Japan, the PlayStation 4 version sold more than 189,000 copies in its first week of release, becoming the second best-selling retail game of the week, behind Animal Crossing: New Horizons. Resident Evil 3 had sold 2.5 million copies by May 2020, and 2.7 million copies by June 30, 2020. Although the latter is a 55% decline from its predecessor's 4.2 million copies sold within a similar time span, Capcom considered the game's sales to be solid and in line with their expectations. In January 2021, Capcom reported that the game had sold 3.6 million copies. In October 2021, the company reported that Resident Evil 3 had sold 3.9 million copies, calling the game a "hit". According to Capcom's 2021 Integrated Report, the game had sold 4.6 million copies by November 2021, with a large portion of these being digital. By January 2023, the game had sold 6.4 million copies. By June 2023, it had sold 7.6 million copies. At the end of 2023 the total sales had reached 8.4 million copies. By April 2025, it had sold 10 million copies. By January 2026, it had sold 10.994 million copies. By May 2026, it had sold 13.36 million copies.By October 2026, it had sold 14.93 million copies.
