= Resident Evil 2 =

1998 video game

- North American key art
- Developer: Capcom (Note: Ported to Nintendo 64 by Angel Studios, with support by Capcom Production Studio 3 and Factor 5.)
- Publishers: Capcom: PlayStation, Dreamcast; JP/NA: Capcom; PAL: Virgin Interactive Entertainment Windows; JP: Capcom/Tsukuda Original; NA: Capcom; PAL: Virgin Interactive Entertainment Nintendo 64; JP/NA: Capcom; EU/AU: Virgin Interactive Entertainment GameCube; JP/NA/EU/AU: Capcom Game.com, 99X Games Tiger Electronics
- Director: Hideki Kamiya
- Producer: Shinji Mikami
- Programmer: Yasuhiro Anpo
- Writer: Noboru Sugimura
- Composers: Masami Ueda; Shusaku Uchiyama; Syun Nishigaki
- Series: Resident Evil
- Platforms: PlayStation; Windows; Nintendo 64; Dreamcast; GameCube; Game.com; 99X Games
- Release: January 21, 1998: PlayStation; NA: January 21, 1998; JP: January 29, 1998; PAL: April 29, 1998 Dual Shock Ver.; JP: August 6, 1998; NA: November 11, 1998 Game.com; WW: November 10, 1998 Windows; UK: February 18, 1999; JP: February 19, 1999; NA: March 4, 1999 Nintendo 64; NA: November 16, 1999; JP: January 28, 2000; PAL: February 9, 2000 Dreamcast; JP: December 22, 1999; PAL: April 28, 2000; NA: December 6, 2000 GameCube; NA: January 14, 2003; JP: January 23, 2003; PAL: May 30, 2003 99X Games; WW: December 31, 1999
- Genre: Survival horror
- Mode: Single-player

Resident Evil 2 (Note: Known in Japan as Biohazard 2 (Japanese: バイオハザード2, Hepburn: Baiohazādo Tsū)) is a 1998 survival horror game developed and published by Capcom for the PlayStation. The player controls rookie cop Leon S. Kennedy and college student Claire Redfield, who must escape Raccoon City after its citizens are transformed into zombies by a biological weapon two months after the events of the original Resident Evil. The gameplay focuses on exploration, puzzles, and combat; the main difference from its predecessor are the branching paths, with each player character having unique storylines, partners and obstacles.

Resident Evil 2 was produced by Resident Evil director Shinji Mikami, directed by Hideki Kamiya, and developed by a team of approximately 50 across 21 months. The initial version, commonly referred to as Resident Evil 1.5, differs drastically; it was canceled at approximately two thirds completion because Mikami decided it was inadequate. The final design introduced a more cinematic presentation.

Resident Evil 2 received acclaim for its atmosphere, setting, graphics, audio, scenarios, overall gameplay, and its improvements over the original game, but with some criticism towards its controls, voice acting, and certain gameplay elements. It is widely listed among the best video games ever made. It is the best-selling Resident Evil game for a single platform at more than 6 million copies sold across all platforms. It was ported to Windows, Nintendo 64, Dreamcast, and GameCube, and a modified 2.5D version was released for the Game.com handheld. The story of Resident Evil 2 was retold and built upon in several later games, and has been adapted into a variety of licensed works. It was followed by Resident Evil 3: Nemesis in 1999. A remake was released for PlayStation 4, Windows, and Xbox One in 2019.

== Gameplay ==
Gameplay of Resident Evil 2, with Leon S. Kennedy engaging zombies in the police station

Resident Evil 2 is a third-person survival horror game which features the same basic gameplay as its predecessor, Resident Evil. The game offers a choice of two protagonists, rookie police officer Leon S. Kennedy or college student Claire Redfield, as they survive a zombie outbreak in the Raccoon City, a fictional town in the Midwestern Arklay Mountains. The player explores while fighting monsters and solving puzzles. While the player characters may be equipped with firearms, limited ammunition adds a tactical element to combat, forcing the player to choose between engaging or evading encounters.

The game uses tank controls, meaning that pressing up moves the character forward, down reverses, and left and right rotates, independently of the camera perspective. On the status screen, the player can check the condition of the player character, view a map of the area, re-read obtained files, and equip or combine items. The characters' health can also be determined by their posture and movement speed. For example, a character will hold their stomach in pain if wounded, and will limp slowly if on the verge of death. The player character will take damage whenever they are caught by an enemy or hazard, and if they take too much damage, they will die, causing a game over. Herbs and first aid spray can be used to heal. Safe rooms scattered throughout the city contain typewriters, where the player may spend ink ribbons to save their progress, and item boxes that can store items, which are necessary because the player characters can only carry a limited number of items with them.

Contrasting with Chris and Jill's different abilities in the previous game, Leon and Claire differ only in their starting key items (a lighter and a lockpick, respectively). The game introduces a "Zapping System" where the two player characters are each confronted with differing puzzles, plot threads, and encounters. After finishing the "A Scenario" as one protagonist, the player will unlock the "B Scenario" for the other, elements of which change to reflect the A Scenario's events, e.g. killed enemies, solved puzzles, and hazards caused by player actions. This results in a total of four unique playthroughs, two for each character, which increases replayability. Each protagonist is joined in certain scenes by a support partner, who become playable during short segments. Like the previous game, there are multiple endings, but unlike the previous game, which ending the player sees is determined solely by which of the four scenarios is being played.

The graphics are composed of real-time generated polygonal characters and item models, superimposed over pre-rendered backgrounds that are viewed from fixed camera angles.

After completing a scenario, the player is given a rank based on their playtime and the number of times they saved or used special healing items. Higher ranks may unlock additional weapons and costumes. Resident Evil 2 contains two standalone missions: "The 4th Survivor" and "The To-fu Survivor". In both, the player must reach the goal while fighting every enemy along the way with only the default item loadout. The PlayStation version requires the player complete both scenarios with high ranks in order to unlock these missions, while the Dreamcast version has them accessible from the beginning. All later versions, excluding the Nintendo 64 version, have an additional "Extreme Battle" minigame, where the player, either as Leon, Claire, Ada or Chris Redfield from the first game, must plant four antivirus bombs around one of three maps while fighting through a gauntlet of enemies with limited supplies.

== Plot ==
Depending on which order the scenarios are played in, the player experiences one of two courses of events which mutually contradict each other. This plot summary covers only the path followed by playing the Claire A and Leon B scenarios, which was suggested by Capcom to be the canon version of events.

On September 30, 1998, two months after the events of the first Resident Evil, most citizens of the Midwestern American mountain community of Raccoon City have been transformed into zombies by the T-virus, a biological weapon secretly developed by the pharmaceutical company Umbrella. Leon S. Kennedy, a Raccoon Police Department (R.P.D.) officer on his first day of duty, meets Claire Redfield, a college student looking for her brother Chris. After being separated, Leon and Claire each make their own way to the Raccoon Police Station. They discover that most of the R.P.D. has been killed, and that Chris has left town to investigate Umbrella's headquarters in Europe. They split up to look for survivors and find a way out of the city. While searching for an escape route, Claire meets a little girl, Sherry Birkin, who is on the run from an unknown creature, and Leon encounters Ada Wong, who claims to be looking for her boyfriend John, an Umbrella researcher from Chicago.

R.P.D. Chief Brian Irons had been bribed by Umbrella to hide evidence of the company's experiments in the outskirts of the city. He concealed their development of the new G-virus, an agent capable of mutating a human into the ultimate bioweapon. Leon has multiple encounters with a Tyrant zombie called Mr. X, a monster air-dropped into the police station by Umbrella to seek the G-virus. Irons tries to murder Claire but is killed by a G-virus mutant. Claire and Sherry escape through the sewers and become separated. After splitting up with Leon, Ada finds Sherry and picks up a golden pendant the girl loses while running away. Further into the sewers, Ada reluctantly teams up with Leon again, after he insists on his duty to protect her. They encounter a middle-aged woman who fires at Ada, but Leon jumps between them and takes a bullet himself. Ada ignores the unconscious Leon and follows the woman, who reveals herself to be Sherry's mother Annette and the wife of William Birkin, the Umbrella scientist who created the G-virus. In an attempt to protect his life's work from an Umbrella Security Service (U.S.S.) team sent by the Umbrella headquarters, he injected himself with the virus, which turned him into a malformed creature. He killed the U.S.S. team, and caused the T-virus to leak into Raccoon City's drinking water, causing the citizens to become infected. William is now chasing Sherry because of her genetic make-up. Annette recognizes her daughter's pendant and attempts to take it from Ada. A fight ensues, during which Annette is thrown over a railing. Ada learns that the golden locket contains a sample of the G-virus, and later – taken over by her emotions – returns to Leon, tending to his bullet wound.

Meanwhile, Claire is reunited with Sherry and discovers that William has implanted his daughter with an embryo to produce offspring. Leon, Ada, Claire, and Sherry advance through an abandoned factory connected to Umbrella's secret underground research facility. An attack by William leaves Ada heavily wounded, and Leon explores the laboratory to find something to treat her. He is interrupted by a psychotic Annette, who says that Ada's relationship with John was only a means of getting information about Umbrella because Ada is a spy sent to steal the G-virus for an unknown organization. Leon does not believe her, saying he trusts Ada. Just as Annette is about to shoot Leon, the Tyrant appears, and she retreats. Ada returns to save Leon and battles the Tyrant, which falls into a pit of molten metal. Ada is mortally wounded from the fight; she and Leon confess their love for each other before Ada stops breathing. Meanwhile, Annette tries to escape with another sample of the G-virus but is fatally wounded by her mutated husband; before she dies, she tells Claire how to create a vaccine that will stop the mutations caused by the embryo within Sherry. After preparing the cure, Leon and Claire reunite at an emergency escape train and inject Sherry with the vaccine, which saves her life. En route, Leon is assisted in terminating the now-mutated Super Tyrant by an unseen figure; Leon briefly thinks it is Ada, but is unable to positively identify her voice over the noise. Grown to gigantic size, William follows Leon and Claire, but is destroyed when the train self-destructs. After escaping from the city with Sherry, Leon intends to take down Umbrella, while Claire continues to search for Chris. HUNK, one of the surviving U.S.S. operators sent by Umbrella, completes his G-virus retrieval mission.

== Development ==
Development of Resident Evil 2 began one month after the completion of its predecessor in early 1996. Resident Evil 2 was developed by a group of about 45 people that later became part of Capcom Production Studio 4. Director Hideki Kamiya led the team, which was composed of newer Capcom employees and over half of the staff from the original Resident Evil. In the initial stages of development, producer Shinji Mikami often had creative disagreements with Kamiya, and tried to influence the team with his own direction. He eventually withdrew into an overseeing role as producer, and only demanded to be shown the latest build once monthly. Development cost more than $1 million.

The creation of the Raccoon City Police Station was based on the Osaka City Central Public Hall.

=== Resident Evil 1.5 ===
In Resident Evil 1.5, an early version, players controlled Elza Walker. The interior of the police station was completely different, with a more modern design.

The first footage of Resident Evil 2 was shown at the V Jump Festival '96 in July. This build, later dubbed Resident Evil 1.5 by Mikami, differed drastically from the final version. Its plot followed the same basic outline and features a zombie outbreak in Raccoon City two months after the events of the first game. However, Umbrella had already been closed as a consequence of its illegal experiments.

The development team sought to retain the degree of fear from the original game, and introduced two characters without experience of terrifying situations: Leon S. Kennedy, largely identical to his persona in the final build, and Elza Walker, a college student and motorcycle racer vacationing in Raccoon City, her hometown. Unlike the final version, the character paths did not cross, and each character had two support partners instead of one. Leon received help from fellow police officer Marvin Branagh and researcher Linda – an early version of Ada – while Elza was aided by Sherry Birkin and John, who appears in Resident Evil 2 as gun shop owner Robert Kendo. Mikami also revealed in 1996 that the sequel would have new monsters, and the number of onscreen enemies would be increased to "around seven or more" to produce "the sensation of terror as the monsters swarm around the character".

Real-world examples influenced character designs by artists Isao Ohishi and Ryoji Shimogama. For example, Ohishi based Leon on his bloodhound, and Annette Birkin on actress Jodie Foster. The police station was smaller with a more modern and realistic design. There were more encounters with surviving policemen, such as a superior officer of Leon named Roy. Enemy models used far fewer polygons, allowing many zombies to appear on the screen. The game employed dynamic music, and altered pre-rendered backgrounds in response to gameplay events. The playable characters could use equipment such as protective clothes to enhance their defense and enable them to carry more items. The character models were altered by costume changes and by damage received from enemies.

Believing the game's assets were good individually, but not yet satisfactory as a whole, Mikami expected that everything would coalesce in the three months leading up to the projected May 1997 release date. Soon after, Resident Evil 1.5 was scrapped at 60–80 percent completion. Mikami later explained that the game would not have reached the desired quality on time, and that the gameplay and locations were dull.

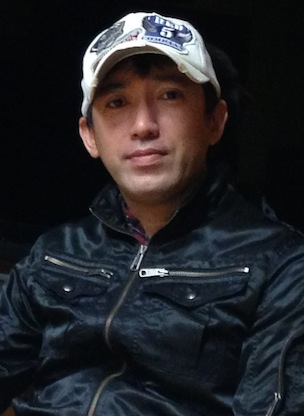
Producer Shinji Mikami withdrew from his hands-on role in development after creative disagreements with the director.

=== Development restarted ===
Mikami planned to end the series with Resident Evil 2. Supervisor Yoshiki Okamoto criticized the story, finding it too conclusive to allow for future installments. Instead, Okamoto proposed the creation of a fictional universe that would turn Resident Evil into a metaseries – similar to the Gundam and James Bond franchises – in which self-contained stories with common elements could be told.

During a period in which the team made no progress rewriting the scenario, Okamoto was introduced to screenwriter Noboru Sugimura, who was enthusiastic about the first game's story. Sugimura was initially consulted on a trial basis, but Okamoto was impressed by the ease with which Sugimara solved script problems, and soon asked him to compose the entire scenario for Resident Evil 2. One fundamental modification to the story was the reworking of Elza Walker into Claire Redfield, in order to introduce a connection to the plot of the first game.

To fulfill Capcom's sales plan of two million copies, director Kamiya tried to attract new customers with a more ostentatious and Hollywood-like story presentation. As Okamoto did not want to simply enforce the new direction, he had Sugimura discuss the plot revisions with Mikami and the development staff. The planners redesigned the game from the ground up to fit the changes, and the programmers and other remaining members of the team were sent to work on Resident Evil Director's Cut, which was shipped with a playable preview disc of the new Resident Evil 2 version in order to promote the sequel and to apologize to the players for its belated release.

Few assets from Resident Evil 1.5 could be recycled, as the principal locations in the final build had been made to look more extravagant and artistic, based on photographs taken of the interiors of Western-style buildings in Japanese cities. The environments were created on SGI O2 computers, and each background took two or three weeks to render. The maximum number of zombies displayed on the screen at one time was limited to seven, making it possible to use 450 polygons for the comparatively detailed models of Leon and Claire. The protagonists, instead of being given visible wounds, were made to limp upon receiving heavy damage. Other than the graphics, one of the most important new features is the "Zapping System", which was partly inspired by Back to the Future Part II, a time travel-themed film sequel that offers a different perspective on the story of the original film. The voice-overs by the all-Canadian cast of Resident Evil 2 were recorded before the actual cutscenes were completed, with each of the actors selected from a roster of ten people per role. Thereafter, the full-motion videos (FMVs) were created by filming stop-motion animations of action figures, which were then rendered to completed pictures with computer graphics (CG) tools. Ada is the only main character not to appear in a pre-rendered cutscene, as her model could not be finished in time.

Resident Evil 2 had a development budget exceeding $1,000,000 (equivalent to $2,000,000 in 2025), and was about twice as large as the original Resident Evil.

Regional releases required several changes. The North American version contains more violent game over screens, which were removed from the Japanese Biohazard 2. Resident Evil 2 was made more difficult (and thus longer-playing) than its Japanese equivalent to prevent short-term rentals from affecting U.S. sales.

=== Music ===
"Raccoon City"
An 11-second sample of the composition "Raccoon City", demonstrating the game's use of music to create a specific type of atmosphere. In this particular piece, the leitmotif of the soundtrack is played by a French horn.

The music for Resident Evil 2 was composed by Masami Ueda, Shusaku Uchiyama, and Syun Nishigaki, except one track composed by Naoshi Mizuta. The music conveys "desperation" as its underlying theme. In his role as lead composer, Ueda provided the motifs, and Uchiyama provided the horror-themed music for the investigation and movie scenes. The main theme, a versatile three-note leitmotif, appears several times throughout the story, included in compositions such as "Prologue", "Raccoon City", and "The Third Malformation of G". Various musical styles, ranging from ambient horror to industrial, represent the different game environments. For example, the streets of Raccoon City are emphasized with militaristic percussion-based music, and the police station features ominous piano underscores. Key events of the story are supported with orchestral and cinematic compositions – a move that was inspired by blockbuster films.

Two albums containing music from the game were released in January and August 1998, respectively. The first, Biohazard 2 Original Soundtrack, is the main release and includes most of the significant compositions. The second, Biohazard 2 Complete Track, largely encompasses less prevalent themes, but offers an orchestral medley and a second CD with sound effects, voice collections, and an interview with the sound staff. The European version of Biohazard 2 Original Soundtrack has an identical CD, Resident Evil 2 Original Soundtrack. In the North American version, the opening theme "The Beginning of Story" is split into four individual tracks. Five orchestral arrangements were included on the Bio Hazard Orchestra Album, a live concert performed by the New Japan Philharmonic. Disc jockey Piston Nishizawa created electronic remixes for several of the compositions, which were later released as the album Biohazard 2 Remix: Metamorphoses.

=== Marketing ===
In Japan, marketing included a live action television commercial directed by renowned zombie film director George A. Romero. The commercial was filmed on location at Lincoln Heights Jail and starred Brad Renfro as Leon Kennedy and Adrienne Frantz as Claire Redfield. The game had a marketing budget of $5,000,000 (equivalent to $10,000,000 in 2025).

== Releases ==
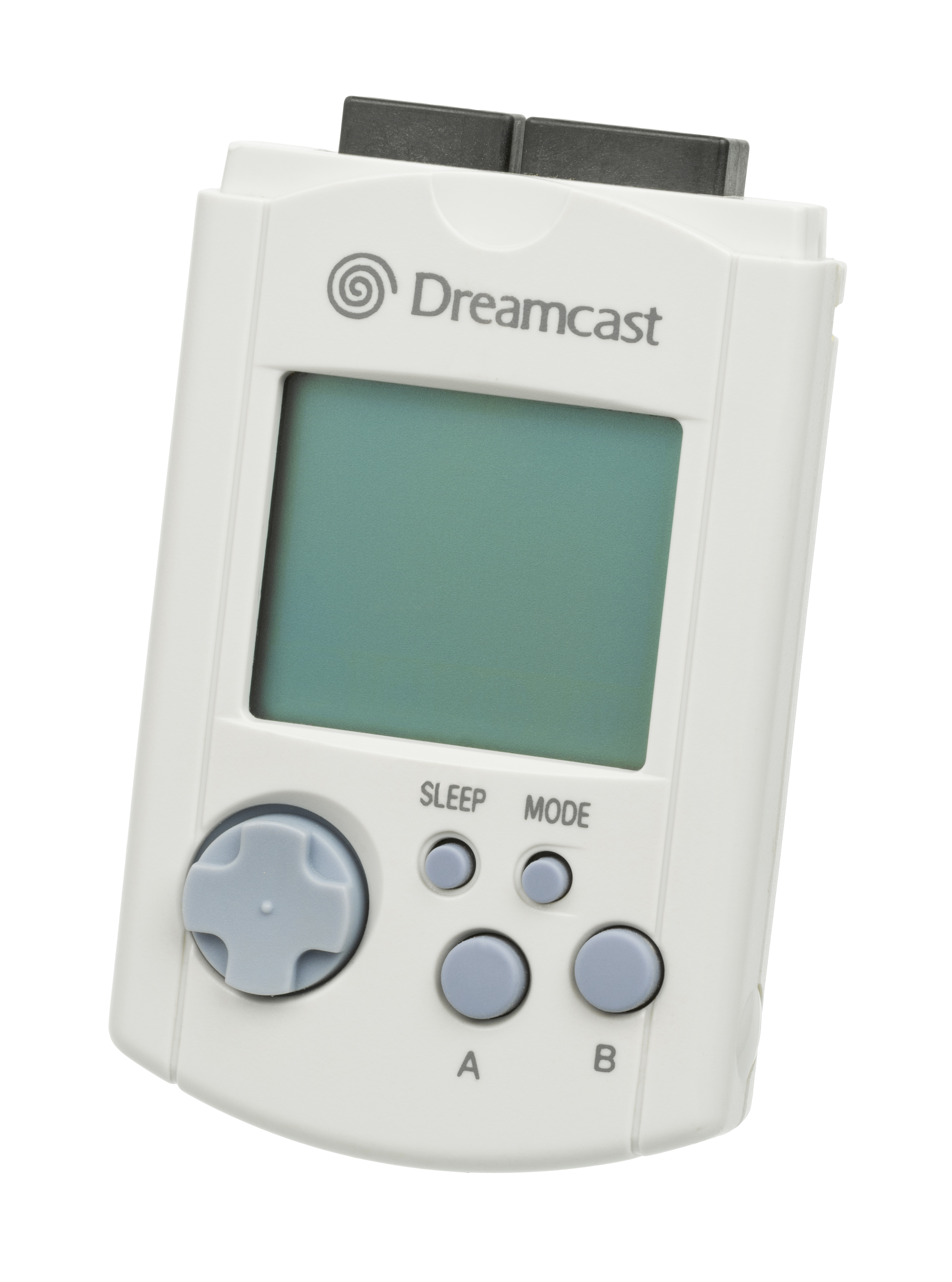
A port of Resident Evil 2 to the Dreamcast added support for the Visual Memory Unit, which displays the condition of the player character.

After its initial release for the PlayStation in January 1998, Resident Evil 2 was reissued and ported to other systems, many gaining new features in the process.

=== Dual Shock Ver. ===
The first re-release is the Dual Shock Ver., which supports the vibration and analog control functions of the PlayStation's DualShock controller. Other additions include a new unlockable minigame called "Extreme Battle", and a "Rookie" mode that enables the player to start the main story with a powerful weapon and infinite ammunition. The Japanese release of the Dual Shock Ver. contains a "U.S.A. Version" mode based on the difficulty level of Resident Evil 2's Western versions. The Dual Shock Ver. served as the basis for the majority of ports, such as the Windows 9x-based PC-CD version Resident Evil 2 Platinum. The PC version retains all previously added features and can be run in higher resolutions. A "Data Gallery" was added to the main menu, allowing the player to view movies, rough sketches, illustrations, and 3D models. In February 2006, a Japan-exclusive, Windows XP-compatible PC-DVD re-release was published. Developed by Sourcenext, it includes high-quality FMVs encoded at 640×480 pixels.

The Dreamcast version keeps the additions from the original PC release, and incorporates real-time display of the character's condition on the Visual Memory Unit peripheral. The Japanese edition of the Dreamcast port has the subtitle Value Plus and a playable demo of Resident Evil – Code: Veronica. An unmodified port of the Dual Shock Ver. was released for the GameCube. The initial PlayStation version was re-released on the Japanese PlayStation Network in 2007, and the service's North American counterpart received the Dual Shock Ver. two years later.

=== Nintendo 64 ===
Released on November 16, 1999, the Nintendo 64 port of Resident Evil 2 is one of the few games released for the console to feature full-motion video cutscenes, overcoming the limited storage space on the cartridge. The PlayStation version with two CD-ROMs of up to 700 MB per disc was faithfully replicated (with unique enhancements) on a 64 MB Nintendo 64 Game Pak. In the process, audio and video assets had to be more aggressively and creatively compressed, using novel techniques that shift the burden away from storage and toward the console's high real-time processing power. Across twelve months and with a budget of $1,000,000 (equivalent to $2,000,000 in 2025), Resident Evil 2 was ported to the console by a team led by nine full-time and one part-time personnel from Angel Studios. Further help was provided by ten staff from Capcom Production Studio 3 and Factor 5. This version offers bonus features that were not included on any other port, such as alternate costumes, a randomizer mode (which places items differently during each playthrough), the ability to adjust the degree of violence and to change the blood color as well as a more responsive first-person control scheme. Additionally, the port features 16 new in-game documents known as the "Ex Files", written by Tetsuro Oyama. Hidden throughout the four scenarios, they reveal new information about the series' lore and connect the story of Resident Evil 2 to those of the other installments, including some that had not been released yet. This is also the only version to use surround sound, with the soundtrack converted to Dolby Surround by Chris Hülsbeck, Rudolf Stember, and Thomas Engel.

The Nintendo 64 version adjusts its display resolution depending on the number of polygonal models currently on screen, and supports the Expansion Pak accessory for a maximum resolution of 640×480 during gameplay. Other visual enhancements include smoother character animations and sharper, perspective-corrected textures for the 3D models. The team reworked the sound set from scratch to provide each instrument with a higher sample rate than on the PlayStation, resulting in higher-quality music. Some features from the other enhanced versions based on the Dual Shock Ver. do not appear in the Nintendo 64 version, such as the "Extreme Battle" minigame. In 2018, Eurogamer called this "one of the most ambitious [and impressive] console ports of all time".

=== Other versions ===
A port of Resident Evil 2 for the Sega Saturn was developed at Capcom, with plans for it to use the console's 4 MB RAM cartridge, but technical difficulties led to its cancellation in October 1998.

Tiger Electronics released a black and white sprite-based 2.5D version for its Game.com handheld on November 10, 1998. It includes only Leon's story path, and lacks many of the original game's core features, including cutscenes and music. This was the first Resident Evil game to be released on a handheld console and to be rated Teen 13+ by the ESRB. Tiger also released a dot-matrix version for its 99X Games handheld on December 31, 1999.

In February 2013, an unfinished build of Resident Evil 1.5 was leaked onto the Internet.

On June 26, 2024, Resident Evil was released on GOG.com, with Resident Evil 2 released on August 27, and Resident Evil 3: Nemesis released on September 25. They were sold both individually and as a $24.99 bundle. The PC port is based on the Dual Shock ver. and includes high-resolution character models and an art gallery. On August 19, 2025, Resident Evil 2 and Resident Evil 3: Nemesis were released on the PlayStation 4 and 5 platforms. On April 1, 2026, the GOG.com release of Resident Evil 2, along with the rest of the original trilogy, were released on Steam.

== Reception ==
Reception

Aggregate scores
Aggregator	Score				
Aggregator	Dreamcast	GameCube	N64	PC	PS
GameRankings	80%	63%	87%	80%	93%
Metacritic	77/100	59/100	89/100	N/A	89/100

Review scores
Publication	Score				
Publication	Dreamcast	GameCube	N64	PC	PS
AllGame	3.5/5	2.5/5	4/5	4/5	4/5
Computer and Video Games	N/A	N/A	N/A	9/10	(CVG) 5/5 (CVG.com) 9/10
Electronic Gaming Monthly	8/10	5.5/10	8.62/10	N/A	9.5/10, 9.5/10, 9/10, 9.5/10
Eurogamer	N/A	N/A	8/10	N/A	N/A
Famitsu	34/40	N/A	N/A	N/A	38/40
Game Informer	N/A	8/10	8.75/10	N/A	9.5/10
GameFan	N/A	N/A	261/300	N/A	291/300
GamePro	N/A	3.5/5	N/A	N/A	N/A
GamesMaster	91%	80%	90%	81%	90%
GameSpot	7.9/10	5/10	8.9/10	(US) 7/10 (UK) 9.2/10	(US) 8.9/10 (UK) 9.2/10
IGN	8.5/10	5/10	9.1/10	6.8/10	9.3/10
Next Generation	4/5	N/A	4/5	N/A	5/5
PlayStation Official Magazine – UK	N/A	N/A	N/A	N/A	9/10
Official U.S. PlayStation Magazine	N/A	N/A	N/A	N/A	5/5
PlayStation: The Official Magazine	N/A	N/A	N/A	N/A	5/5
Chicago Tribune	N/A	N/A	N/A	N/A	4/4

Resident Evil 2 received critical acclaim upon release. Its original PlayStation release holds an average aggregate score of 93% at GameRankings based on 25 reviews, and 89 out of 100 points at Metacritic for both the PlayStation and Nintendo 64 versions based on 13 reviews. The majority of reviews praised Resident Evil 2 for its atmosphere, setting, graphics, audio, and overall gameplay, but criticized its controls, voice acting, and certain gameplay elements.^{[b]}

Computer and Video Games magazine's Steve Key and Alex Huhtahla praised the gameplay, puzzles, horror, graphics, audio, and the scenario system's replay factor. Electronic Gaming Monthly magazine's four reviewers agreed it was better than the original game, and said almost everything about the sequel is "flawless", including the gameplay, graphics, layout, level of detail, sound, frightful atmosphere, suspenseful story, and scenario system. They criticized the controls and menu system, but said the controls were an improvement over the original. The game tied with the PlayStation version of Point Blank for their "Game of the Month". GameFan magazine's three reviewers praised the gameplay, tension, environments, graphics, voice acting, and scenario system. Game Informer magazine's three reviewers praised the concept, graphics, sound, playability, and entertainment. PSM magazine praised the puzzles, monsters, and weapons. Next Generation called it "the must-own title of the year", saying it made leaps over the original game in terms of longevity and graphics while retaining the original's core appeal.

IGN's Ricardo Sanchez said that the atmosphere was "dead on", and that "[the] graphics, sound effects, music, and level design all work together to create a spooky, horror-filled world". Ryan Mac Donald of GameSpot shared the opinion, and found the game to be "like a product out of Hollywood ... more an interactive, cinematic experience than a video game". Writing for ComputerAndVideoGames.com, Paul Mallinson considered the atmosphere, story, and film-like presentation its most outstanding features, and though he found its plot to be "far-fetched", he said it was "kept down to earth by clever scripting and gritty storytelling". GamePro staff writer Mike Weigand called the narrative "engrossing and dramatic", and the dialogue "well-written" and "spell-binding". IGN, GameSpy, Next Generation, and Eurogamer all praised the game offering of multiple scenarios for adding to the story and increasing the replay value. GameSpot said that the idea of actions in the first scenario affecting the second was "cool in concept", but underused, while Allgame's Shawn Sackenheim didn't find the additional scenarios attractive enough for casual players and lamented the inventory system was "a pain" for requiring players to visit item boxes and manage their character's carry limitations.

Resident Evil 2 was praised for its graphics, which many critics said were a substantial improvement upon those of the first installment. Sanchez and Weigand said that the pre-rendered backgrounds were an impressive leap ahead of those in the original Resident Evil, due to their increased detail and interactivity. Next Generation said that the character models now stood out less from the backgrounds. Shawn Smith of Electronic Gaming Monthly found the rendered cutscenes far preferable to the live action ones of the original. Mac Donald praised the model animations for having reached "true realism", and commended the use of body language as a means of seamlessly communicating the condition of the protagonists' health. Allgame awarded its graphics the highest possible score, as he found the backgrounds to be "rendered to perfection", the cutscenes "a work of art", and the animation "fluid and eerie".

The audio was well received by critics. Weigand cited it as an "excellent accompaniment to the visuals". Sanchez went as far as to say that Resident Evil 2 "may have the best sound design yet for a console game". Next Generation said it had "the most precise and realistic sound effects ever heard in any game". Sackenheim described the music and sound effects as "spot on perfect" and the soundtrack "perfectly composed", and Mac Donald likened the use of audio to that of classic horror films. Some reviewers panned the voice acting, calling it "cheesy", "terrible", and "barbaric".^{[c]}

With the exception of the critically acclaimed Nintendo 64 version, most later releases of Resident Evil 2 have received slightly lower scores than the PlayStation version.^{[d]} Weigand advised players who already owned Resident Evil 2 to rent the Dual Shock Ver. for the "Extreme Battle" minigame, and recommended that newcomers buy the updated edition instead of the original release. The Windows version was praised for its additional content, but criticized for not allowing the player to save at will, and for lacking updated backgrounds to fit the higher in-game resolution.^{[e]} Eurogamer said that version's total elimination of CD-ROM load times make the game "extremely fun and simple". The Nintendo 64 version was widely commended for the technical achievement of fitting a two-disc game on a single 512-Mbit (64MB) cartridge. However, Taylor criticized this version for retaining scenes from the PlayStation version that were used to conceal its CD-ROM loading times – a technical disadvantage absent from cartridge.^{[f]} GamePro writer "The Freshman" was impressed with the enhanced graphics of the Nintendo 64 version, but was disappointed by its heavily compressed FMVs. GameSpot's Joe Fielder found the compression to be forgivable given the cartridge format, and that the new exclusive features made up for the lack of the "Extreme Battle" mode. Eurogamer said the Nintendo 64's unique analog control "works supremely well to the point where it's borderline game-breaking". IGN reviewer Matt Casamassina praised the Dolby Surround support, and called the Nintendo 64 version the best. In 2018, Eurogamer called it "one of the most ambitious [and impressive] console ports of all time".

The clearer sound effects of the Dreamcast port were received well by GameRevolution's Shawn Sparks, who also remarked that the character models look slightly sharper. However, Steve Key of Computer And Video Games disliked the Dreamcast release's low-resolution backgrounds, which he thought made the characters stand out too much from the environments, and thus lessened the atmosphere. GameSpot staff writer James Mielke said that the Dreamcast port was not "an essential purchase", but still a "great game" at an attractively low price. The GameCube release was heavily criticized for its high price and dated graphics.^{[g]} However, "Four-Eyed Dragon" of GamePro noted its superior in-game visuals compared to any other version. Davis and 1UP.com's Mark MacDonald were disappointed by the version's lack of features that were included in the Nintendo 64 release. Peer Schneider of IGN found the 2.5D version for the Game.com frustrating and only "partially faithful" to the original release of Resident Evil 2. Although he believed that its graphics and sound effects managed to recreate the original game's atmosphere to a certain extent, he thought that its controls were too "sluggish" to allow for an enjoyable experience.

=== Sales ===
Resident Evil 2 was promoted with a $5,000,000 (equivalent to $9,900,000 in 2025) advertising campaign. In Italy, it reached 100,000 pre-orders, worth over 12 billion lire or $6,600,000 (equivalent to $13,000,000 in 2025). It became the fastest-selling video game in North America. On the weekend following its release, more than 380,000 copies were sold, grossing $19,000,000 (equivalent to $38,000,000 in 2025). It therefore surpassed the opening revenue of all but one Hollywood film for the same weekend and broke previous sales records set by the video games Final Fantasy VII and Super Mario 64. In its first month of release in the United States, it was the best-selling home console video game by unit sales. After six weeks, the game's global sales had topped 3 million copies, with 1.9 million sold in Japan and over a million sold in the United States.

Weekly Famitsu named it Japan's best-selling game for the first half of 1998, with sales of 2.13 million units. By August 1998, 2,298,814 copies were sold in Japan. According to the NPD Group, it was 1998's sixth best-selling game in the United States by unit sales. At the 1999 Milia festival in Cannes, Resident Evil 2 took home a "Gold" prize for revenues above €29 million or $33,000,000 (equivalent to $65,000,000 in 2025) in the European Union during 1998. With 4.96 million copies sold, the original PlayStation version of Resident Evil 2 was a commercial success, and is the franchise's best-selling game on a single platform. By March 1999, approximately 11 million units of all versions of Resident Evil and Resident Evil 2 had been sold worldwide, including 810,000 copies of Resident Evil 2: Dual Shock Ver. In Japan, 17,973 copies of the Nintendo 64 and GameCube versions were sold. In the United States, 326,397 copies of the Nintendo 64 version were sold. The Chinese PC version sold nearly 300,000 copies, which encouraged Capcom to release other games in Chinese, such as Dino Crisis (1999).

=== Accolades ===
Resident Evil 2 was a finalist at the AIAS' inaugural Interactive Achievement Awards for "Console Action Game of the Year" and "Console Adventure Game of the Year", but lost to GoldenEye 007 and Final Fantasy VII. In Electronic Gaming Monthly's 1998 Gamers' Choice Awards, Resident Evil 2 was the runner-up for Best Adventure Game of the Year and Readers' Choice Best PlayStation Game of the Year, behind Metal Gear Solid, which won in both award categories. The Video Software Dealers Association nominated it for Video Game of the Year.

Resident Evil 2 has been held in high regard in the years following its initial release, and was named the fourth best game on the PlayStation by Famitsu. It is listed as one of the 100 best games of all time by Electronic Gaming Monthly (62nd), IGN (58th), Empire (49th), Game Informer (34th), and Official UK PlayStation Magazine (6th).^{[a]} Readers of Retro Gamer voted Resident Evil 2 the 97th top retro game, and the staff wrote it was "considered by many to be the best in the long-running series".

=== Controversy ===
In Italy, Resident Evil 2 was temporarily banned in 1999 following criticism from the political organization "Movimento Diritti Civili" (Civil Rights Movement) for its realistic depiction of violence, with the law enforcement agency Guardia di Finanza seizing over 5,500 unsold copies. Sony Computer Entertainment asked for a re-examination of the seizure decree, and the ban was lifted a few months later.

== Legacy ==
Lucas M. Thomas of IGN considered Resident Evil 2 to be the "trendsetter" for modern zombie media by popularizing the imagery of zombie hordes filling city streets. Resident Evil 2 appears in the British sitcom Spaced in the episode "Art", in which a character hallucinates that he is fighting a zombie invasion. Spaced director Edgar Wright cited this episode inspired by Resident Evil 2 as the basis for his zombie comedy film Shaun of the Dead (2004). Gabe Newell of Valve Corporation was inspired by Resident Evil 2 to take "creepiness and horror" seriously when developing Half-Life.

Resident Evil 2 is the basis of several licensed works and later games. Ted Adams and Kris Oprisko loosely adapted it into the comics "Raccoon City – R.I.P." and "A New Chapter of Evil", which were released in the first and second issues of Resident Evil: The Official Comic Book Magazine in March and June 1998. The 60-issue Hong Kong comics Biohazard 2 was published weekly from February 1998 to April 1999. A romantic comedy retelling of the story, centered on Leon, Claire and Ada, was released as the Taiwanese two-issue comic Èlíng Gǔbǎo II (lit. 'Demon Castle II'). Resident Evil: City of the Dead, a 1999 book written by S. D. Perry, is a more direct adaptation of the narrative, and is the third release in her series of Resident Evil novelizations, published by Pocket Books in 1999.

The mobile game Resident Evil: Uprising contains a condensed version of the Resident Evil 2 story, adapted by Megan Swaine. Resident Evil: The Darkside Chronicles, an on-rails shooter released for the Wii in 2009, includes a scenario named "Memories of a Lost City", which reimagines the original Resident Evil 2 plot while retaining key scenes from the game's four scenarios. In 2008, Resident Evil 5 producer Jun Takeuchi, who had previously worked on the series as weapons designer and graphics animator, alluded to the possibility of a full-fledged remake. Such a project had already been considered for the GameCube in 2002, but Mikami abandoned the idea as he did not want to delay the in-development Resident Evil 4.

The story arcs introduced in Resident Evil 2 continue in drama albums and later game releases. Kyoko Sagiyama, Junichi Miyashita, Yasuyuki Suzuki, Noboru Sugimura, Hirohisa Soda, and Kishiko Miyagi – screenwriters employed by Capcom's former scenario subsidiary Flagship – created two radio dramas, Chiisana Tōbōsha Sherry ("The Little Runaway Sherry") and Ikiteita Onna Spy Ada ("The Female Spy Ada Lives"). The dramas were broadcast on Radio Osaka in early 1999, and later released by publisher Suleputer as two separate CDs, Biohazard 2 Drama Album. Chiisana Tōbōsha Sherry begins shortly after the events of the game. Sherry is separated from Claire while fleeing from Umbrella soldiers sent to kill all witnesses of the viral outbreak. Raccoon City is burned down by the U.S. Government and Umbrella in an attempt to cover up the disaster. Sherry seeks refuge in the neighboring town of Stone Ville, and later escapes to Canada with the help of a girl named Meg, who vows to help her reunite with Claire.

Ikiteita Onna Spy Ada is set a few days after Resident Evil 2, and deals with Ada's mission to retrieve Sherry's pendant with the G-virus sample, which is said to be in the possession of HUNK in the backstory of the drama album. Ada intercepts the delivery of the locket in France, and kills HUNK and his men. As a consequence of an accidental T-virus leak in Loire Village, the destination of the delivery, Ada is forced to retreat to an old castle. Along with a unit of the French Air Force sent to burn down the village, she encounters Christine Henry, the Umbrella facility director who gave HUNK the order to deliver the G-virus to France. Jacob, the leader of the airborne unit, is revealed to be Christine's co-conspirator. However, he plans to keep the G-virus sample for himself, and shoots her. Philippe, another member of the unit, convinces Ada to give him the pendant, after which he injects himself with the G-virus to give himself the power to stop Jacob. Ada escapes and realizes her feelings for Leon, deciding to quit the spy business and return to him. The characters' story arcs are continued differently: Sherry is taken into custody by the U.S. Government immediately after the events of Resident Evil 2, and Ada keeps the pendant with the G-virus and resumes her activities as a spy. HUNK successfully delivers a separate G-virus sample to Umbrella.

=== Remake ===
In August 2015, Capcom announced that a remake of Resident Evil 2 was in development. Capcom unveiled the game at E3 2018, with trailers and gameplay footage, and a worldwide release date of January 25, 2019 for PlayStation 4, Windows, and Xbox One. The game uses the RE Engine, which is also in Resident Evil 7: Biohazard, and replaces the tank controls and fixed camera angles with "over-the-shoulder" gameplay similar to Resident Evil 4.
