= Resident Evil 3: Nemesis =

1999 video game

- North American cover art
- Developer: Capcom
- Publishers: Capcom: PlayStation, Windows; JP/NA: Capcom; PAL: Eidos Interactive; Dreamcast; JP/NA: Capcom; PAL: Virgin Interactive Entertainment; GameCube; WW: Capcom
- Director: Kazuhiro Aoyama
- Producer: Shinji Mikami
- Programmer: Kiyohiko Sakata
- Writer: Yasuhisa Kawamura
- Composers: Masami Ueda; Saori Maeda
- Series: Resident Evil
- Platforms: PlayStation; Windows; Dreamcast; GameCube
- Release: September 22, 1999: PlayStation; JP: September 22, 1999; NA: November 11, 1999; EU: February 21, 2000; Windows; JP: June 16, 2000; EU: November 24, 2000; NA: April 4, 2001; Dreamcast; NA: November 15, 2000; JP: November 16, 2000; EU: December 21, 2000; GameCube; NA: January 15, 2003; JP: January 23, 2003; EU: May 30, 2003
- Genre: Survival horror
- Mode: Single-player

Resident Evil 3: Nemesis (Note: Known in Japan as Biohazard 3: Last Escape (Japanese: バイオハザード3 ラストエスケープ, Hepburn: Baiohazādo Surī Rasuto Esukēpu)) is a 1999 survival horror game developed and published by Capcom for the PlayStation. It takes place almost concurrently with the events of Resident Evil 2. The player controls the former elite agent Jill Valentine as she escapes from Raccoon City, which has been overrun by zombies. The game uses the same engine as its predecessors and features 3D models over pre-rendered backgrounds with fixed camera angles. Choices through the game affect how the story unfolds and which ending is achieved.

Resident Evil 3 was developed concurrently with Resident Evil – Code: Veronica (2000) and was conceived as a spin-off featuring a different protagonist. It was designed to have a more action-oriented gameplay than its predecessors and features a larger number of enemies. It also introduces Nemesis, a creature that periodically pursues the player.

Resident Evil 3 received acclaim and sold more than three million copies worldwide. Critics praised the setting, detailed graphics and Nemesis as an intimidating villain, but some criticized its short length and simple story. It was ported to Windows, Dreamcast, and GameCube with varying degrees of critical success. In particular, the GameCube version was criticized for its relatively high retail price and outdated graphics. A remake, Resident Evil 3, was released in 2020.

== Gameplay ==
The player, playing as Jill Valentine, is evading a zombie. Like its predecessors, Nemesis features 3D models over pre-rendered backgrounds with fixed camera angles.

Resident Evil 3: Nemesis is a survival horror game. The player controls Jill Valentine from a third-person perspective to interact with the environment and enemies. The player takes control of another character for a brief portion. To advance, the player explores a city while avoiding, outsmarting and defeating enemies. The player can interact with the environment in several ways, such as opening doors, pushing objects or climbing obstacles. Scattered throughout the city are weapons, ammunition and other items, which can be collected and put in the player's inventory. Items can be examined, used, or combined with others. The inventory is limited to a certain number of slots, and the player must often move items from the inventory to a storage box located in special rooms to manage space.

The player can use a variety of firearms to defeat enemies, ranging from pistols to a rocket launcher. Aside from enemies, parts of the environment, such as explosive barrels, can be shot at, causing them to explode and damage nearby enemies. The game also introduces the ability for players to dodge attacks or perform a quick 180-degree turn to evade enemies. The player has a certain amount of health which decreases when attacked by enemies. Health is regained with first aid sprays, as well as herbs, which can be used separately or mixed together to increase their healing effect. Players can create new ammunition from different varieties of gunpowder. In addition to engaging in combat, the player must often solve puzzles that focus on logical and conceptual challenges.

During certain situations, the player will be put in a perilous situation, where they will be prompted to choose between two possible actions or suffer a certain penalty, if not instant death. These choices affect how the story unfolds and which ending is achieved. Additionally, a creature called Nemesis is encountered multiple times as a boss. Nemesis is considerably more powerful than the player and has the ability to use a rocket launcher, dodge incoming fire, and pursue the player from one area to the next. During one of these encounters, the player can choose to either fight Nemesis or run until he is evaded. A variety of encounters are possible, with some being mandatory, and some varying in nature and location based on certain choices made by the player. Even if evaded or defeated during one of these encounters, Nemesis will inevitably continue to pursue the player.

Once the player completes the game, a mode called The Mercenaries - Operation: Mad Jackal is unlocked. In this mode, the player must control mercenaries that Jill encounters during the main game and run from one side of the city to the other within a limited amount of time and resources. However, the starting time limit given is insufficient to actually perform this task directly, and the player must continuously receive time extensions by performing certain actions such as defeating enemies, rescuing civilians and exploring hidden areas. Depending on the rank received and difficulty chosen, completing the main game may unlock alternate costumes for Jill and epilogue files that detail the activities of different characters. The Mercenaries mode and alternate costumes for Jill do not need to be unlocked in the Windows and Dreamcast versions.

== Plot ==
On September 28, 1998, 24 hours prior to the events of Resident Evil 2, former Special Tactics And Rescue Service (S.T.A.R.S.) member Jill Valentine attempts to escape from Raccoon City. Most of the population has been transformed into zombies by an outbreak of the T-virus, the gruesome biological weapon secretly developed by the pharmaceutical company Umbrella Corporation. After fighting through zombies and mutants on her way to the Raccoon City Police Department, Jill runs into fellow team member Brad Vickers, who is later killed by a new enemy. This creature, Nemesis-T Type, is a bio-organic weapon programmed to target the surviving S.T.A.R.S. members, who had knowledge of Umbrella's experiments. After she evades Nemesis, Jill encounters three surviving members of the Umbrella Biohazard Countermeasure Service (U.B.C.S.): Carlos Oliveira, Mikhail Victor, and Nikolai Zinoviev. Nikolai explains to Jill that a rescue helicopter can be contacted if they manage to reach the city's Clock Tower to ring the bell.

When they are finished repairing a cable car, Nikolai goes missing and is presumed dead. Nemesis then corners the remaining members of the group onto the car as they head to the tower. Mikhail sacrifices himself with a grenade, causing the car to crash into the tower's central courtyard and separating Jill and Carlos briefly. At the Clock Tower, Jill summons the helicopter by ringing the Clock Tower's bell before being confronted by Nemesis, which destroys the helicopter and infects Jill with the T-virus. Jill manages to temporarily defeat Nemesis but she falls unconscious due to the T-virus infection given by Nemesis. Carlos finds Jill and takes her to safety within the Clock Tower. Three days later, he finds a vaccine for Jill's T-virus infection in a nearby Umbrella owned hospital, then returns and administers it to her, saving her.

After she regains consciousness on the morning of October 1, 1998, Jill proceeds towards the Raccoon Park to search for an escape route and enters the park caretaker's cabin. There, she runs into Nikolai, who reveals that he is a "supervisor" sent into Raccoon City to gather combat data on Umbrella's bioweapons. Nikolai retreats, and Jill later is confronted by the Gravedigger, a massive worm-like creature. Jill defeats it and escapes to an abandoned Umbrella factory at the edge of town through the worm’s tunnels. Inside the factory, Jill meets up with Carlos, who tells her that the U.S. government is planning to launch an experimental thermobaric missile into Raccoon City to eradicate the T-virus infestation. After confronting Nemesis and grabbing a keycard needed to escape, Jill learns that the missile attack on Raccoon City has begun, with only a short time left before the city is destroyed.

Depending on the path taken by the player, Jill's final encounter with Nikolai will differ. In one version of the events, Nikolai will attempt to start a gunfight with Jill, only to be ambushed and killed by Nemesis. In another event, Nikolai will hijack Jill's intended escape chopper, and the player must either reason with Nikolai or destroy the helicopter. If Jill negotiates with Nikolai, he reveals that he has killed the other supervisors and boasts about collecting the bounty placed on Jill by Umbrella before escaping. Regardless of Nikolai's fate, Jill makes her way to the rear yard and confronts Nemesis again. After an intense battle, Jill defeats Nemesis with the help of a large prototype railgun before meeting up with Carlos and escaping the city via a helicopter. If the previous escape chopper was stolen by Nikolai, Jill and Carlos will instead meet up with S.T.A.R.S. Alpha Team's weapons specialist Barry Burton, who helps them escape in his helicopter. At sunrise, the missile vaporizes Raccoon City, and Jill swears revenge on Umbrella. A newscast then briefly details the destruction and offers condolences for the lost lives.

== Development ==
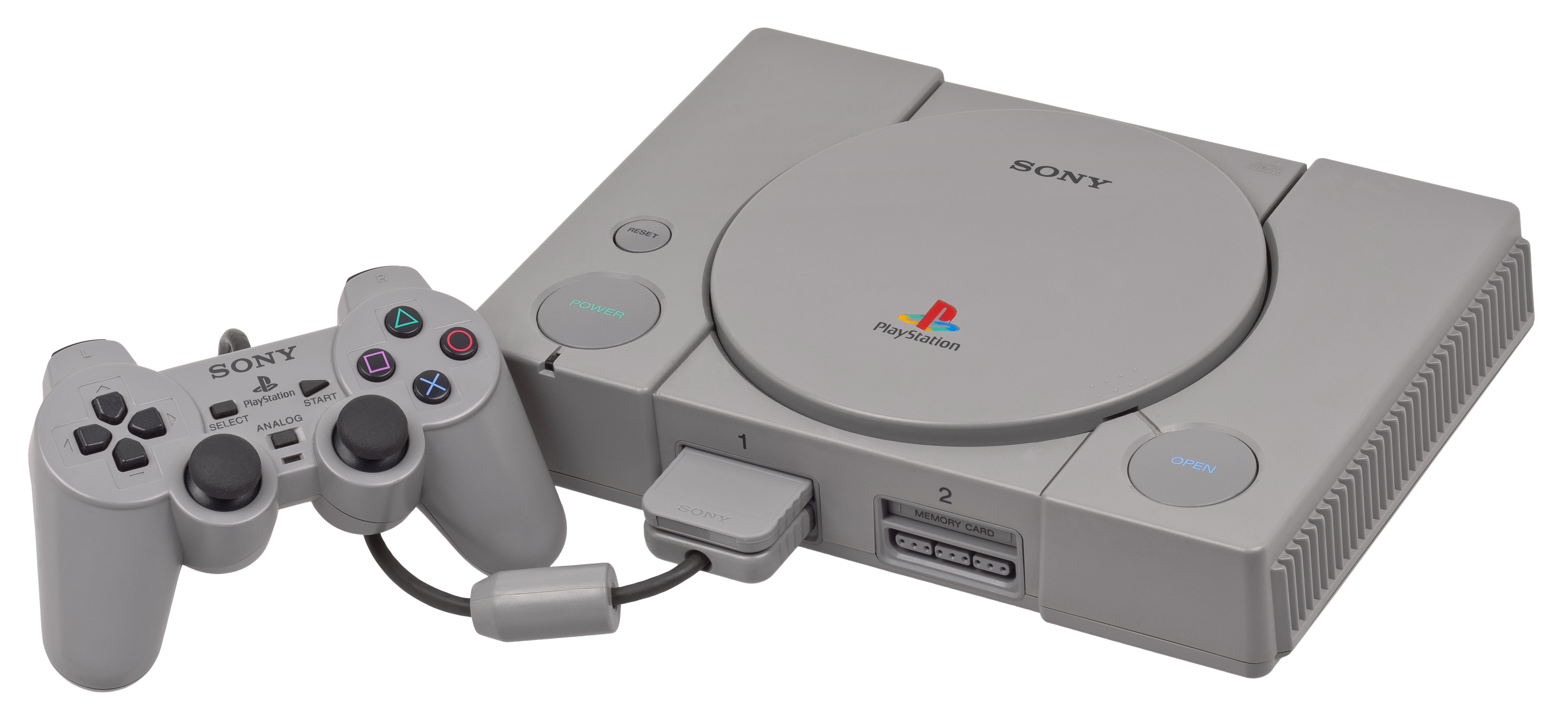
Resident Evil 3 was the last numbered Resident Evil game developed for the PlayStation.

Resident Evil 3 was developed by Capcom and produced by Shinji Mikami, who had directed the original Resident Evil and produced Resident Evil 2. After Resident Evil 2 was released, Capcom was working on multiple Resident Evil projects, with Hideki Kamiya directing what was planned to be the next main installment. This game would take place on a cruise ship and would involve HUNK attempting to bring back a sample of the G-Virus. However, Capcom cancelled the project after Sony announced the PlayStation 2, claiming that its development would not be completed before the PlayStation 2's launch. Because Capcom did not want fans to wait years for a new Resident Evil on PlayStation, it promoted one of its side projects as the third main game while Kamiya's team moved onto Resident Evil 4.

The selected project was a spin-off developed by an inexperienced team led by director Kazuhiro Aoyama. It was intended to introduce a new character who would escape from an infected Raccoon City. However, after the promotion, Capcom made Resident Evil protagonist Jill Valentine the main character and decided that Raccoon City would be destroyed. Unlike the majority of the early scripts in the series, the story was not created by Capcom's Flagship studio but by internal Capcom writer Yasuhisa Kawamura, who had little experience with Resident Evil. Kawamura played the original game to familiarize himself with its fictional universe. The story was proofread and sanctioned by Flagship to avoid continuity errors with other games, an issue that was also given attention in monthly meetings between all directors and producers.

Resident Evil 3 uses the same game engine as its predecessors. The environments consist of 2D pre-rendered backgrounds while moving objects, such as enemies and some interactive elements, consist of 3D polygon graphics. The developers chose this technique because having full 3D graphics would not allow them to create graphically rich and detailed environments. According to project supervisor Yoshiki Okamoto, "the number of polygons allocated for the enemies would not be sufficient. We did not want to have blocky, pixelated zombies." Interaction with the environment was improved so that the player could shoot objects such as explosive barrels to damage enemies. The developers also added more zombie varieties, which can take the form of policemen, doctors, and ordinary citizens, among others.

Unlike previous Resident Evil games, which mostly took place inside buildings, Resident Evil 3 takes place largely in the streets of Raccoon City. This allowed the developers to create more varied environments. Capcom introduced more action mechanics, which resulted in the addition of the 180-degree turn and a dodge feature to avoid attacks. Additionally, they allowed for up to nine enemies to appear at the same time and improved their artificial intelligence to hunt the player up and down stairs. The Nemesis creature was inspired by the liquid-metal T-1000 from the 1991 film Terminator 2: Judgment Day. According to Mikami, "I wanted to introduce a new kind of fear into the game, a persistent feeling of paranoia. The Nemesis brings that on in spades. When it disappears after the first confrontation, you live in constant dread of the next attack. The idea is to make you feel like you're being stalked."

Resident Evil 3 was developed concurrently with the Dreamcast version of Resident Evil – Code: Veronica. It was originally referred to as Biohazard 1.9 or Biohazard 1.5 because it takes place between the first two Resident Evil games. Although Code: Veronica is set after Resident Evil 2, Capcom wanted Nemesis to be the third numbered game to keep the PlayStation games consistent. Development began with a team of 20 people, but the size gradually increased to between 40 and 50 staff members. Unlike Resident Evil 2, which features two discs with two different protagonists, Resident Evil 3 is a single-CD game that centers on Jill Valentine. Capcom chose her as the only protagonist because she was "the only suitable character remaining", noting that Claire Redfield and Chris Redfield had already been chosen for Code: Veronica.

== Marketing and release ==
Resident Evil 3 was featured at the Tokyo Game Show in March 1999. A playable version was available at the Electronic Entertainment Expo in 1999. At the time, the dodging feature had not been completed and was absent from the demo. Capcom included a brief demo of Resident Evil 3 in the US shipments of their earlier game, Dino Crisis, which had a successful launch in Japan. Prior to the release, Capcom spent US$20 million on advertisement campaigns for Resident Evil 3 and Dino Crisis, as well as the Nintendo 64 version of Resident Evil 2. The marketing campaign included dedicated television advertising, print advertising, and incentives to the consumer. A double soundtrack album, composed by Masami Ueda, Saori Maeda and Shusaku Uchiyama, was released on September 22, 1999. A novelization, Nemesis, written by S. D. Perry, was published in 2000.

Resident Evil 3 was released for the PlayStation video game console on September 22, 1999 in Japan and November 11, 1999 in North America. The first 500,000 copies included additional demo discs of Dino Crisis. It sold more than 1 million copies worldwide by early October. According to NPD, Resident Evil 3 was the top-selling game for the PlayStation in the US during the first two weeks of November 1999. In Europe, it was released on February 21, 2000 and became a bestseller in the UK, where it received a "Gold" sales award from the Entertainment and Leisure Software Publishers Association, indicating sales of at least 200,000 copies. As of June 2012, a total of 3.5 million copies of the PlayStation version had been sold.

== Reception ==
PlayStation reviews

Aggregate score
Aggregator	Score
Metacritic	91/100

Review scores
Publication	Score
AllGame	4.5/5
Computer and Video Games	5/5; 9/10
Edge	8/10
Famitsu	9/10, 9/10, 9/10, 9/10
GamePro	5/5
GameRevolution	A−
GameSpot	8.8/10
IGN	9.4/10
Next Generation	4/5
PlayStation Official Magazine – UK	10/10
Official U.S. PlayStation Magazine	4.5/5

Upon its release on the PlayStation console, Resident Evil 3 received "universal acclaim", according to Metacritic. GameSpot editor James Mielke considered it the most sophisticated and accomplished Resident Evil game in terms of graphics and gameplay. Official UK PlayStation Magazine called Resident Evil 3 "a modern-day classic", concluding that it "creates a believable environment, populates it with a host of evil adversaries and uses Raccoon City's urban sprawl to enhance the fiendish puzzles." Computer and Video Games (CVG) said that it preserves the best features of its predecessors and adds "some exciting new elements". Edge described it as "engrossing", despite its similarity to its predecessors, and found the Mercenaries mode a valuable addition.

The pre-rendered backgrounds were credited for their rich details and dark art style. According to IGN editor Doug Perry, "Crashed cars, rubbish and rubble, totally destroyed city streets, and scattered broken glass and debris, all are housed in a suburban area that truly looks devastated in the worst possible way." GameSpot felt that the 3D modeling of Jill Valentine was greatly improved compared to the "blocky" models in the original game. The music and sound effects received similar praise, with GamePro writing that Resident Evil 3 "keeps the action hot by hiding what you shouldn't see, but telling you about it through the audio". The introduction of the Nemesis creature was praised. Official UK PlayStation Magazine described the first encounter as shocking, while CVG said that the creature increases the tension level "to an insane degree" because the player never knows when he will appear.

GameSpot praised the prompted choices during certain points as they encourage replay value, but felt Resident Evil 3 was too short compared to Resident Evil 2, with only one disc and one protagonist. Perry praised the live-action-choice feature, stating that it "speeds up the pace, increases the tension, and forces a decision that varies the following scene". He found the 180-degree turn and dodge moves as welcome and necessary additions. In contrast, Official U.S. PlayStation Magazine criticized the dodge feature as impractical and for relying too much on timing, resulting in doing more harm to the player. GameRevolution and Official U.S. PlayStation Magazine criticized the simple premise and voice acting, while Next Generation said that Resident Evil 3 might be a tiresome for players familiar with its predecessors. Resident Evil 3 was nominated for GameSpot's 1999 Adventure Game of the Year.

== Legacy ==
=== Ports and re-releases ===
Resident Evil 3 was ported to the Microsoft Windows and Dreamcast platforms in 2000, featuring enhanced 3D character models and higher resolution graphics. The Dreamcast version includes more alternate costumes than in the PlayStation version. Critical reception for these ports was not as positive. The Microsoft Windows version was criticized for not being optimized for keyboard and mouse and for not letting players save their progress at any time. Critics noted that some of the pre-rendered backgrounds in the Dreamcast version were not improved, resulting in them looking not as good as the PlayStation version's due to the Dreamcast's higher graphic fidelity. CVG generally praised the Dreamcast version, but admitted that the difference in graphical quality between Resident Evil 3 and Code: Veronica was very large.

A GameCube version was released in 2003 as part of an exclusivity agreement between Capcom and Nintendo. It received mixed reviews from critics and was mainly criticized for its relatively high retail price and outdated graphics. AllGame said that the fact that it was not priced as a budget title could mislead buyers into thinking that it was an enhanced update similar to the 2002 Resident Evil on the GameCube. GamePro remarked that, while the graphics on the GameCube were not like those of the 2002 Resident Evil or Resident Evil Zero, they were better-looking than previous versions. As of November 2003, 41,395 copies of the GameCube version had been sold in the U.S. Resident Evil 3 was digitally released on the PlayStation Network in Japan in 2008 and North America in 2009, allowing PlayStation 3 and PlayStation Portable users to play the PlayStation version via emulation.

On June 26, 2024, Resident Evil was released on GOG.com, with Resident Evil 2 released on August 27, and Resident Evil 3: Nemesis released on September 25. They were sold both individually and as a $24.99 bundle. They will include enhanced 3D character models and higher-resolution graphics on its release. On August 19, 2025, Resident Evil 2 and Resident Evil 3: Nemesis were released on the PlayStation 4 and 5. On April 2, 2026, Resident Evil, Resident Evil 2 and Resident Evil 3: Nemesis were released on Steam.

=== Remake ===
A remake, Resident Evil 3, was released in 2020. It is played from an over-the-shoulder perspective and runs on Capcom's proprietary RE Engine. Many parts were rearranged in favor of a more focused story. Some features, such as the multiple endings, several locations and the Mercenaries mode were removed. It received generally positive reviews.
