= Resident Evil Outbreak: File 2 =

2004 video game

Resident Evil Outbreak: File #2
- North American box art
- Developer: Capcom
- Publisher: Capcom
- Director: Eiichiro Sasaki
- Producer: Tsuyoshi Tanaka
- Artist: Yoshihiro Ono
- Writers: Yuji Matsumoto; Koichi Okada; Kazunori Kadoi
- Composers: Akihiko Matsumoto; Tetsuya Shibata; Etsuko Yoneda
- Series: Resident Evil
- Platform: PlayStation 2
- Release: JP: September 9, 2004; NA: April 26, 2005; PAL: August 26, 2005
- Genre: Survival horror
- Modes: Single-player, multiplayer

Resident Evil Outbreak: File #2 (Note: Known in Japan as Biohazard Outbreak: File 2 (Japanese: バイオハザード アウトブレイク ファイル2, Hepburn: Baiohazādo Autobureiku Fairu Tsū)) is a survival horror video game developed and published by Capcom with online playability for the PlayStation 2. It is the sequel to Resident Evil Outbreak, and the final installment of the spin-off series. It was released on September 9, 2004 in Japan, on April 26, 2005 in North America, and August 26, 2005 in PAL regions.

After the success of Outbreak in Japan, Capcom announced a sequel in Fall 2004. The game takes place in zombie-infested Raccoon City with the same eight characters that were featured in its predecessor, along with five new scenarios.

Upon release, File #2 featured online multiplayer servers, but in March 2007 all servers shut down. In January 2014, alternate fan servers restored online play, along with new additions to the servers, such as ban lists and leaderboards.

== Gameplay ==
=== Scenarios ===
When starting the game, the player selects a scenario, difficulty level, and a character. Each difficulty level changes the enemies and items the player encounters as they progress. The game has five scenarios: "Wild Things", "Underbelly", "Flashback", "Desperate Times" and "End of the Road". There are two bonus scenarios, "Elimination" and "Showdown", designed as training guides to improve gameplay. Each scenario has an event checklist consisting of special actions that the player must perform to reach 100% completion. At 100%, the player unlocks "Infinity Mode", in which the player's weapons never break or run out of ammunition. Completing the game in offline unlocks the option to choose one AI partner instead of two or no AI partners while replaying the five scenarios.

Each scenario also has invisible, randomly generated special or "SP" items hidden throughout the level. There are twenty SP items for each scenario, and twenty items specific to each character hidden across the five scenarios. If acquired, these items unlock new costumes and the option to listen to character ad-libs.

If players wished to stop playing, they could save their data and restart from the scenario they were up to at the time. Players can also save their progress using typewriters in offline.

The game begins with up to four players in online or one player with two AI partners in offline. The player characters are infected with the T-virus, which is shown as a virus gauge, via the inventory menu. Players must complete each scenario before the virus gauge reaches 100% or they will die, resulting in a game over. When players take too much damage, they will collapse and crawl, prompting the virus to speed up faster until the player uses herbs, first aid sprays or recovery medicines on themselves, or another player/AI partner helps them back up on their feet to slow down the virus. If the player succumbs to the virus in online, they will transform into a zombie and continue to control their character by attacking the other players until the mutated player is defeated or dies instantly after a certain amount of time has passed. The player and their AI partners will not transform in offline. Exclusively in File #2, the AI partners will randomly offer items to the player from time to time and are able to carry the injured player around.

The sequel features crossover data where costumes and skins that were purchased and stored in a save file can be transferred to Outbreak or File #2.

=== Controls ===
The controls and gameplay are similar to the Resident Evil remake, which was exclusive to the GameCube. Rather than using voice chat or typing to communicate, players use a command "ad-lib" system which consists of ten key command phrases. They are used by manipulating the right analog stick on the PlayStation 2 controller and a context-sensitive button. The player can select and request items from their teammate's inventory, or ask the teammate themselves to use the item in question. The new additions included the ad-lib phrase "Sorry", context-related comments on the Map and File screens, and the player commanding AI partners to use items they possess via the inventory menu.

The sequel also adds a new difficulty mode, "Nightmare Mode", and changes the game balance with several alterations to previous damage charts. The game also adds the ability to move the player's character while in attack stance, allowing a character with a gun to move and shoot at the same time.

Unlike the first game, the eight protagonists are each given extra items to start with in their inventory. Kevin Ryman and Mark Wilkins carry extra ammo for their handguns, Jim Chapman carries a lucky coin that increases the chance of shooting enemies with a critical shot, George Hamilton is equipped with a capsule shooter used to fire medicine or anti-virus pills at friends and enemies respectively, David King has a lighter to solve puzzles and make molotov cocktails, Alyssa Ashcroft is equipped with a stun gun, Yoko Suzuki holds a lucky charm that prevents instant death attacks and slows the virus infection rate, and Cindy Lennox carries a bandage that prevents her and others from bleeding. Some of the characters have new abilities. Kevin can attack enemies with his elbow, Yoko can push them away, Jim can do a timed combo swing with melee weapons, David can use his tool belt to unlock hatches, Cindy can duck from attacks while carrying the injured and Mark is able to move heavy objects that otherwise require two or more players.

=== Regional differences ===
In the North American version of the game, the 'ad-libs' from the first game were removed; characters only made noise when the player used the analog stick or made a request. The Japanese release features full voices, while the European version features voices, but without text.

The Japanese version features Japanese subtitles for the cutscenes, but as with previous Biohazard titles, the characters retain the use of English. Due to the variety of characters, this can lead to a strange continuity in which the Japanese subtitles read as having all the characters saying the same thing in some situations.

The minor character, "Linda", is called "Rinda" in the Japanese version. In Japan, the game ran on the KDDI MMBB service. In the United States, this service was swapped out for the Sega Network Application Package. Because of this change, several features were removed from the NTSC/PAL versions, including private messaging, advanced search options, and special search filter options.

=== Multiplayer mode ===
Players were able to connect to the internet servers using a broadband connection and network adapter. Account registration and login were required. Capcom announced on March 31, 2007, that they were shutting the online servers. Capcom shut down the American servers for File #2 on December 31, 2007, and the Japanese servers on June 30, 2011, ending official online capabilities. File #2's online play was greatly improved from the online play in Outbreak. It featured a new lobby system, events system, and more options and modes of play.

Capcom ran events from April to late May of 2005 that were sponsored by various gaming magazines. This included events from PlayStation Magazine, Electronic Gaming Monthly, and many others. Clearing these events rewarded the players with characters and costumes. Some events took place in standard levels on set difficulties, while others placed the player in selected levels with Infinite and Nightmare options activated before the two options were available for free use. After all sponsored events ended, Capcom ran two events in circulation, a point bonus event and an SP item hunt.

The lobby system was revamped to include ten areas with different options in each one; however, this change made it harder to join games with friends. In order for a player to join a friend in their hosted or current game the player needed to enter a menu to search for their name, then exit that menu, choose the area they are in, and find the game. This menu did not mention the number of players in the game when searched for, meaning a game could be full before the player joined.

In early July, Capcom closed an alternate server, leaving only one choice for the player when they connected. Months after, Nightmare Mode, Infinity Mode, and changes to the Area system were made. HDD Support was dropped from the Area Screen, but players could still host games with HDD mode turned on by activating it offline.

From within the game, or by a link on the official Capcom sales page of their United States site, players could look and see their position on the ranking boards.

== Plot ==
The beginning of File #2 is set a couple of days after the initial outbreak of the T-virus in Raccoon City, moments before the crisis further escalates into complete chaos. The game starts with eight characters in Jack's Bar, who are unaware what is happening until a lone zombie wanders into the bar and attacks. Soon after, the characters escape the bar and make it through the city to safety. The game ends in the final moments of the same incident, with the player attempting to escape Raccoon City before the U.S. government launches a missile strike to eliminate the threat posed by the T-virus. The player controls one of eight characters with gameplay events transpiring across various regions of Raccoon City and span over a period of several days.

=== Playable characters ===
- Kevin Ryman (voiced by Kirk Thornton) - A member of the Raccoon City Police Department. Kevin applied for the Special Tactics and Rescue Service (S.T.A.R.S.) but failed because of his carefree attitude. He is an accomplished marksman. Kevin was a regular at Jack's Bar and was there when the outbreak began. He has a "pot shot" ability that allows him to perform more general bullet damage than anyone else and is an all rounder who begins with his own weapon.
- David King (voiced by Joe Romersa) - A handyman at Raccoon City, who's able to create weapons using his tools. He was drinking at Jack's Bar before the outbreak begins. His age was unknown. He can fix weapons or create new ones if the player finds material.
- Mark Wilkins (voiced by Beau Billingslea) - A veteran of the Vietnam War. He settled down in Raccoon City with his wife and son. At the time of the outbreak, Mark was employed as a security guard. He was eating at Jack's Bar with a co-worker when the story begins. He has the most HP out of the starting cast, not counting secret unlockables, but he can't hide in certain places teammates could.
- Alyssa Ashcroft (voiced by Wendee Lee) - An investigative reporter of the Raccoon Press. She had her memories suppressed by an Umbrella Researcher to cover-up an incident at the Arklay Mountains. She can pick locks and access areas teammates can't and has a weaker version of Kevin's pot shot ability. Ashcroft is the only confirmed survivor of the cast, with her name appearing in Resident Evil 7 as the author of a 2016 newspaper article, and appears in Resident Evil Requiem during flashbacks depicting events eight years prior to the start of the game. She is the mother of Grace Ashcroft, who is a playable protagonist in Requiem.
- Cindy Lennox (voiced by Michelle Ruff) - A waitress at Jack's Bar. She was in Jack's Bar when the infected attacked. She can hold more herbs than any of her allies and even begins with a useable supply but her other stats are below average and she has the second lowest HP of the starting cast.
- Yoko Suzuki (voiced by Stephanie Sheh) - A university student and former Umbrella Corporation employee. Her memories were suppressed about her time at Umbrella when she became a burden to them. She has the unique backpack ability that allows her to hold eight overall items, double that of everyone else's general items, though her other stats are among the lowest in the game, and she also has the lowest HP of the starting cast.
- Jim Chapman (voiced by Kevin Seymour) - A subway staffer of Kite Bros Railway who is easily scared. He has a unique "luck" mechanic and could play dead but also has the fastest infection growth rate of all the starting cast.
- George Hamilton (voiced by Dave Mallow) - A surgeon at Raccoon General Hospital. He can create medicine from herbs and other supplies, provided the player has the proper ingredients.

There are five individual scenarios in this game which are not set in chronological order. The first scenario listed is "Wild Things," in which Cindy Lennox leads the rest of the survivors to the Raccoon City Zoo in hopes of reaching a rescue helicopter on the other side of the zoo. Throughout the scenario, players are pursued by an array of animals infected by the virus, the most dangerous being the zombie elephant Oscar, who follows the players from area to area until he is either locked in the Elephant Stage or killed by the players. Should they reach the Front Plaza without killing him or locking him away, he will appear as the boss; otherwise, the zombie lion Max will be the boss. Once the players reach the end of the stage and board the tram, the tram stops, and the rescue helicopter is shown on fire in the distance, with the pilot dying of his injuries outside of the burning helicopter.

The second scenario, "Underbelly," follows the players' journey into a subway station and attempt to escape the city using a subway train. Before they can leave, however, another moving train runs into a pile of debris and explodes, awakening the "Giga Bite," an enormous flea, who the players later fight at the end of the stage. To initiate this fight, one of the players is kidnapped by the Giga Bite while waiting for their train to depart. After defeating the boss, if the players do not make it back to the train in time, they must find an alternate way out through the Substation Tower, which is through the ventilation shaft.

In the third scenario, "Flashback," Alyssa Ashcroft leads the survivors to a cabin in the woods where they are met by Albert Lester (Also known as Al), who promises to lead them to a neighboring town. He mysteriously disappears once the players reach a bridge leading to an abandoned hospital. There are two different paths, depending on what the player does:

- After 15 minutes, the bridge will break down preventing passage. Turning back to the cabin, the player meets an injured woman named Regan, who explains that her daughter Lucy is lost somewhere in the woods. Regan gives Lucy's Pendant to the player, which she says will make Lucy more willing to trust you. When you revisit the woods, the enemies' placement changes. If the player saves Lucy, who can be found on the shore, she will give you a reward. Subsequently, Regan tells the player there is another suspension bridge that leads outside the woods.
- When the player enters the hospital, a masked axe-wielding man chases them throughout the scenario. Players must kill sections of a giant plant that has overtaken the hospital building by injecting them with a serum-filled syringe. The final boss is the core of the plant, which is later found to be controlled by an infected Dorothy, Al's wife, who was experimented on in the hospital. Al is shown in the ending to have been leading people to the hospital to kill them in order to feed his wife in her plant form. If the player plays through the level as Alyssa, they will experience several flashbacks at different points in the scenario, as Alyssa and a friend who died at the hands of a zombified Dorothy once investigated the hospital's ethics years ago. The player could also get different endings depending on how many files they collected in the hospital.

In the fourth scenario, "Desperate Times," finds the players in the Raccoon City Police Department defending themselves from zombies that have crowded outside of the station. By finding several plates, the players open a secret passage for one of the cops, Rita, to navigate and find help. Before she can return, the zombies break through the gates of the police department, and the players must defeat a certain number (depending on which difficulty they chose) of them before completing the scenario. The players are forced to leave policeman Marvin behind as they drive away, while he locks himself in the room (where he was later found by the player character of Resident Evil 2).

In the final scenario, "End of the Road," David King leads the survivors to an Umbrella laboratory, where they are met by two scientists, Linda and Carter, who have returned to get the cure. Before they can leave, an alarm sounds, and a shutter closes the exit, which the scientists are unable to open. The lab is infested with hunters, which Carter fends off by awakening the Tyrant to fight for him. As the group is about to exit, however, the Tyrant turns on the players, killing Carter and throwing Linda from a ledge. The Tyrant then follows the players for the rest of the scenario. The players enter the sewers below the lab, where they find Linda alive. Depending on whether or not the player killed the Tyrant, they are either washed away in the sewers with Linda or left behind to reach the upper levels themselves. Regardless, the players encounter a mutated Tyrant on the city streets. Players are given a chance to rescue Linda, who is shot by a sniper (who also shoots at the players), and must be carried by the player to the end of the stage. They can choose to escape by truck but must fight Nyx, the final boss, before doing so, or by helicopter, without fighting a final boss. There are four different endings:

- "Up and Away with Linda" is obtained by escaping the city by helicopter with Linda.
- "Up and Away" is obtained by escaping the city by helicopter, but letting Linda die on the way or not finding her.
- "Run Like the Linda" is obtained by escaping the city by truck with Linda.
- "Run Like the Wind" is obtained by escaping the city by truck, but letting Linda die on the way or not finding her.

Obtaining the first or the third ending grants the player the Good ending and epilogue for the character chosen, and obtaining the second or the fourth ending will grant the player the Bad ending.

== Development and release ==
Resident Evil Outbreak: File #2 was developed by Capcom Production Studio 1 over a one-year period. Although graphics did not differ greatly from its predecessor, elements of gameplay and online features were overhauled. For example one of the biggest changes over the first game was that players had the ability to select their own AIPCs. Originally this was not allowed, with the two characters being set based on scenario and player character (for example, Kevin always had Mark and Cindy in "Outbreak", and Yoko and David in "Decisions, Decisions").

While most of Europe had access to a server, unlike the previous release, certain countries still had their versions edited to not allow it as servers in their language were not secured. As a 100% completion required the player to do certain things each level that could only be done online, these versions had those goals removed.

The five scenarios chosen were "Wild Things", "Underbelly", "Flashback", "Desperate Times" and "End of the Road". Unlike the scenarios released in Outbreak, those released in File #2 took considerable use of story branching, allowing players to get different endings based on gameplay. In the case of "Underbelly", the player could fail to reach a departing subway train and leave the station via a ventilation shaft. In the case of "Flashback", different endings were reached based on whether or not the player collected certain files in the hospital, and they could even end the scenario without ever reaching it.

Alyson Court, the voice of Claire Redfield from the Resident Evil games and the director of Outbreak's voice-over and motion capture portions, returned doing the latter work for File #2. The voice-over was directed by Kevin Seymour.

On September 22, with File #2 more than a week into its release, it reached news sites that Capcom was falling into financial difficulties in its stock, with Media Create citing 91,000 sold copies of the game in Japan so far, much less than Capcom's expectations. The ability to strafe and shoot simultaneously was added. Load times were also improved. The game was released on September 9, 2004, in Japan and on April 26, 2005, in North America.

== Reception ==
Reception

Aggregate scores
Aggregator	Score
GameRankings	63%
Metacritic	58/100

Review scores
Publication	Score
1Up.com	D−
GameSpot	6.6/10
GameSpy	3/5
GamesRadar+	3/5
IGN	6.5/10

Resident Evil Outbreak: File #2 received mixed reviews. On review aggregator website Metacritic, the game received a total score of 58/100, and a score of 63% on GameRankings.
