= Sankaku (disambiguation) =

Sankaku (Japanese: (三角) "triangle") may refer to:

- Sankaku (さんかく), a 2010 Japanese film
- 「△」Sankaku, a 1999 album by Bloodthirsty Butchers

== See also ==
- Senkaku (disambiguation)
- Sangaku (算額), Japanese geometrical problems or theorems on wooden tablets
