= Senkaku =

Senkaku may refer to:

- Senkaku Islands (尖閣列島), disputed territory named "Diaoyu" or "Diaoyutai Islands" in Mandarin Chinese, also known as "Pinnacle Islands", administered by Japan
- Senkaku (priest) (仙覚, 1203 – c. 1273), a Japanese Buddhist priest
- Yasui Senkaku (安井仙角, 1700–1737), the head of the Yasui school of Go, which was established in 1612
- Senkaku Jinja (尖閣神社) a shinto sanctuary
- Senkaku, a fictional character in a Japanese manga series, Rurouni Kenshin

== See also ==
- Sankaku (disambiguation)
- Diaoyu (disambiguation)
