= Last Money: Ai no Nedan =

- Genre: Drama
- Starring: Hideaki Itō; Yuichi Nakamaru; Shin Yazawa; Takuya Nagaoka
- Composer: Yuki Hayashi
- Country of origin: Japan
- Original language: Japanese
- No. of episodes: 7

Original release
- Network: NHK
- Release: September 13 – October 25, 2011

Last Money: Ai no Nedan (ラストマネー -愛の値段-) is a Japanese television drama series that started airing on NHK on September 13, 2011.

== Cast ==
- Hideaki Itō
- Yuichi Nakamaru
- Shin Yazawa
- Takuya Nagaoka
