= Hōtai Club =

- Film poster
- Directed by: Yukihiko Tsutsumi
- Screenplay by: Yukihiko Tsutsumi; Yoshiko Morishita
- Based on: Hōtai Club by Arata Tendō
- Produced by: Daisuke Ooka; Toshiya Nomura
- Starring: Yūya Yagira; Satomi Ishihara; Kei Tanaka; Shihori Kanjiya; Chiaki Satō
- Cinematography: Satoru Karasawa
- Production companies: Chikuma Shobō; Dentsu; Horipro; Office Crescendo; Stardust Promotion; Toei Company; TBS
- Distributed by: Toei Company
- Release date: September 15, 2007 (Japan)
- Running time: 118 minutes
- Country: Japan
- Language: Japanese

Hōtai Club (Japanese: 包帯クラブ; lit. The Bandage Club) is a 2007 Japanese film directed by Yukihiko Tsutsumi and based on a novel by Arata Tendō. The film stars Yūya Yagira as Tatsuya "Dino" Ideno and Satomi Ishihara as Emiko "Wara" Kiba.

== Plot ==
After Wara's father leaves, her mom falls into depression and drinking; her brother doesn't seem to care anymore, and Wara herself (a high school student) drifts without much interest in life. One day, after a minor accident, she meets a boy on the roof of the hospital. He asks whether she's going to kill herself by jumping off. He picks up her fallen bandage and ties it around the fence, declaring that he has bandaged her heart by doing so. Dino admits that if Wara hadn't been there, he probably would have jumped off himself.

Wara shows her friend Shiomi 'Tanshio' Tanzawa (Shiori Kanjiya) the same type of compassion when Shiomi breaks up with her boyfriend, by bandaging nearby swings. Shiomi takes a picture of the bandaged swing and posts it on the internet. Through the internet, Shiomi meets Shinichi 'Gimo' Yanagimoto played by Kei Tanaka who suggests that they create the Bandage Club that will accept requests to bandage the place where someone was hurt, take a picture, and post it on their page. Their headquarters are a rented in an office building. Wara protests that they can't really create such a club using another person's idea. Wara doesn't know Dino's name but recognizes his school uniform. She visits his school to find him.

After Dino agrees to join the club, Wara is still hesitant and feels that it is naive. However, she still participates because she feels that the bandaids do help. They find out that Dino is self-destructive and often ends up in the hospital when they watch him light firecrackers while he is in a tent.

Wara and Shiomi think of inviting their friends, Risuki Ashizawa and Akari 'Tempo' Motohashi. They find Risuki and convince her to visit Tempo's new apartment. But both refuse to join; Risuki claims that it is stupid and Tempo sees it as a waste of studying time; both believe that what happens to others is none of their business. They argue, Tempo dismissing those who do not go to college as losers and Risuki telling her that many have no choice but to work. Risuki announces that the building where Tempo lives used to be the factory where her father worked, and storms out. Shiomi follows Risuki but Wara stays to persuade Tempo.

Outside the building, Wara finds Risuki and Shiomi joined by Dino and Gimo. Risuki catches sight of small flowers nearby that were originally planted by her father when he worked at the factory. She then decides to join the club.

Soon after the bandage club begins to gain popularity, they are accused of trespassing. Someone reports the locations to the police in order to stop them; hate messages appear on their website.

Just when Wara, Dino, Shiomi, Gimo, and Risuki consider breaking up the Bandage Club; they are called by Tempo's mother who tells them Tempo is missing and fears that she might commit suicide. Tempo comes out of hiding in the end when Dino bandages an entire building's rooftop and agrees to join the Bandage Club amidst tears and the reunion of the four member Japanese Language Group. Dino is caught by the police but was bailed by his father who turns out to be an extremely influential politician.

The movie soon delves into Dino's past and his junior high school experience where one of his two closest friends stabs the other when they were alone at his house causing the other to be paralyzed from the waist down. Wara helps Dino deal with his past and finally cross the bridge that he refused to cross before when they were to bandage a spot on the other side that led to the house of his friend that had been stabbed to finally confront him. Dino believes that it was his fault that his friend was stabbed and his other friend was convicted for the attack and sent to a special school because he was not there that day when he was supposed to be and that his friend that got stabbed had taken the knife instead of him. Dino writes a letter to the friend that had stabbed his other friend and is told that he probably would've been stabbed instead if he was there. Dino then visits his friend that got stabbed and his friend wants to join their Bandage Club.

== Cast ==
- Yuya Yagira as Tatsuya "Dino" Ideno
- Satomi Ishihara as Emiko "Wara" Kiba
- Kei Tanaka as Shinichi "Gimo" Yanagimoto
- Shihori Kanjiya as Shiomi "Tanshio" Tanzawa
- Chiaki Satō as Ritsuki "Risky" Ashizawa
- Megumi Seki as Akari "Tempo" Motohashi
- Jun Fubuki as Tempo's Mother
- Motoki Ochiai as Kyōsuke Kiba
- Kensho Ono as Tsukkomi
- Kento Hirasawa as Maiū
