= Children of Iron =

- Theatrical release poster

Japanese name
- Kanji: 鉄の子
Transcriptions
- Revised Hepburn: Tetsu no ko
- Directed by: Koki Fukuyama
- Written by: Kaori Moriyama; Koki Fukuyama
- Produced by: Shoji Masui; Masahiko Yamakawa
- Starring: Tomoko Tabata; Jyonmyon Pe; Taishi Sato; Mau Konishi; Sugi-chan
- Cinematography: Kazuhiro Taniguchi
- Edited by: Osamu Suzuki
- Music by: Akira Miyake
- Production company: Altamira Pictures
- Release dates: July 18, 2015 (Tokyo); February 13, 2016
- Running time: 74 minutes
- Country: Japan
- Language: Japanese

Children of Iron (Japanese: 鉄の子, Hepburn: Tetsu no ko) is a 2015 Japanese drama film directed by Koki Fukuyama. It was the opening film at the 2015 SKIP CITY INTERNATIONAL D-Cinema FESTIVAL and was also screened at the 2015 Tokyo International Film Festival. The film's theme song is "Otona ni Nattara" (大人になったら) by Glim Spanky.

== Plot ==
Rikutaro Maehara lives alone with his mother Yayoi in Kawaguchi, Saitama. Yayoi is a hostess at a hostess club. Rikutaro's father, who was an iron founder, died some years ago. When his mother marries Kon Nishino, a divorced man whom she met at the hostess club, Rikutaro suddenly finds himself with a new father, as well as with a sister, Mariko.

As the house is small, the children have to share a room, a situation neither of them is happy with. Since Mariko is of the same age as Rikutaro she is put in the same class at primary school. There they are teased by some of their classmates, who call Mariko Rikutaro's 'fake sister' and his 'new wife' as, because of their parents' marriage, they now share the same surname. Embarrassed, the children decide to engineer a divorce between Yayoi and Kon, to which purpose they sign a pact drawn up by Mariko. First they try to persuade Kon that the marriage was a bad idea by spoiling the food and suggesting that the ghost of Rikutaro's father might be haunting the house. When this fails, Mariko puts on lipstick and kisses her father's shirt so as to suggest that he is having an affair. Yayoi sees Mariko with the lipstick, however, and then helps her apply another colour that 'suits her more'. She subsequently gives Mariko the lipstick.

Gradually, the children begin to bond. Rikutaro shows Mariko the Shinto Shrine in Kanayama-cho where he and his father used to pray to the Kami of metal production, and takes her to the foundry where his father used to work. There, he introduces her to Takashi Iizuka, who was one of his father's colleagues, and gives her a piece of iron from the foundry that he polished. Mariko's kiss on Kon's shirt proves to have been prophetic, however. Kon, who has found a job at a real estate agent, starts staying away until late at night, leaving the children to their own devices. The film heavily implies that he is having an affair with a colleague from work. Yayoi, however, only finds out that Kon does not come home after work when Mariko comes down with a fever and Rikutaro calls her at the hostess club, not knowing what to do, and unable to reach Kon.

Kon refuses to tell Yayoi what he does at night, claiming that 'she would not understand'. The children briefly run away together, to one of Mariko's favourite childhood spots. There, she reveals to Rikutaro that a letter in which her biological mother promises to visit her was actually written by herself. The children then share another moment of bonding, pretending that they can enter different worlds by running through a tunnel. The last world they visit is one in which they have grown up and 'do not have to be alone'. When Yayoi and Kon find the children, Yayoi shows her relief at having found them, while Kon only scolds his daughter. On the bus ride home, Mariko refers to Yayoi as 'mother' for the first time.

Soon afterwards, a row takes place between Kon and Yayoi. Seemingly wanting to leave the house, Kon, who has been drinking, tries to pull Mariko out of her bed. Mariko tells her father that he is hurting her, and both children shout our for Yayoi, referring to her as 'mother'. When Yayoi tries to help Mariko, Kon roughly pushes her against the cupboard. Alerted by the neighbours, the police come. Yayoi tells them it was nothing, and eventually they leave. Mariko, however, shouts that Yayoi was hurt by her father.

In the last scene, Kon packs up his car and drives away with Mariko, who is holding the lipstick Yayoi gave her and the piece of iron that she was given by Rikutaro. When Kon asks her what she is looking at her answer is 'her family'.

== Cast ==
- Tomoko Tabata as Yayoi Nishino
- Jyonmyon Pe as Kon Nishino
- Taishi Sato as Rikutaro Nishino
- Mau Konishi as Mariko Nishino
- Sugi-chan as Takashi Iizuka

== Title ==
The title refers to a scene in the film in which Takashi Iizuka tells Rikutaro that he, as a 'child of iron' is strong enough to pull through, in spite of the adversity.

== Source and themes ==
The film is a semi-autobiographical depiction of life in a dysfunctional family. Taking his own childhood experiences and those of his once-stepsister Mariko, Koki Fukuyama produced a basic script which he subsequently polished with professional writer Kaori Moriyama.

In a February 2016 Q&A session, Koki Fukuyama stated that the film is about 'trying to survive and do one's best in situations that you really can't do anything about', both in the case of the children and their parents.
