= Diaoyu =

Diaoyu (釣魚), which means "fishing" in Chinese, may refer to the following:

- A Mandarin Chinese-derived name of the Senkaku Islands, a Japanese-administered area separately disputed by the People's Republic of China (PRC) and by the Republic of China (Taiwan)
- Diaoyu Fortress, Chongqing, China

== See also ==
- Senkaku (disambiguation)
