= Resident Evil Outbreak =

2003 video game

- North American box art
- Developer: Capcom Production Studio 1
- Publisher: Capcom
- Director: Eiichiro Sasaki
- Producers: Noritaka Funamizu; Katsuhiro Sudo; Tsuyoshi Tanaka
- Artists: Yuji Imamura; Yoshinori Ono
- Composers: Akihiko Matsumoto; Tetsuya Shibata; Etsuko Yoneda
- Series: Resident Evil
- Platform: PlayStation 2
- Release: JP: December 11, 2003; NA: March 30, 2004; PAL: September 17, 2004
- Genre: Survival horror
- Modes: Single-player, multiplayer

Resident Evil Outbreak (Note: Known in Japan as Biohazard Outbreak (Japanese: バイオハザード アウトブレイク, Hepburn: Baiohazādo Autobureiku)) is a survival horror video game developed and published by Capcom for the PlayStation 2. It was released on December 11, 2003 in Japan, on March 30, 2004 in North America, and on September 17, 2004 in PAL regions. It was the first entry in the Resident Evil video game series to feature cooperative gameplay and online multiplayer support, although online support was not available for the PAL versions of the game.

Outbreak depicts a series of episodic storylines in a zombie-inhabited Raccoon City. Players control eight characters with unique abilities. It is set during the same general time period as Resident Evil 2 (1998) and Resident Evil 3: Nemesis (1999). Capcom released a standalone expansion, Resident Evil Outbreak: File #2, the following year. The game was praised for its graphics, fun factor and multiplayer, but criticized for lacking voice chat.

== Gameplay ==
Players can give items to their AI partners and vice versa.

The controls and gameplay are similar to the Resident Evil remake, which was exclusive to the GameCube, with quite a few adjustments. The player chooses a scenario, difficulty level, and character selection screen. The difficulty level is tied to what enemies and items the player encounters while progressing through the scenario. The game has five scenarios, each of which has an event checklist consisting of special actions that the player must perform to reach 100% completion. Upon doing so the player will unlock "Infinity Mode", in which all the player's weapons never break or run out of ammunition. Completing the game on Hard difficulty unlocks "Lone Wolf Mode", where the player begins the game offline without AI partners.

Each scenario also has invisible, randomly generated "SP" items hidden throughout the level. There are twenty scenario items for each scenario, and twenty items specific to each character hidden across the five scenarios. If acquired, these items unlock new costumes and the option to listen to their ad-libs.

Players were able to connect to the internet servers using a broadband connection and network adapter. Account registration and login were required. Once players connected, they could choose between Free Mode or Scenario Mode. Free Mode took place in a lobby, allowing players to create their own games, scenarios, and difficulty level. Scenario Mode would automatically choose the scenario and players. When a player started online, the game would begin on the "Outbreak" scenario and progress from there. If players wished to stop playing, they could save their data and restart from the scenario they were up to at the time. Players can also save their progress using typewriters in offline. After completing a scenario, players acquired a star next to their name.

The game begins with up to four players in online or one player with two AI partners in offline. The player characters are infected with the T-virus, which is shown as a virus gauge, via the inventory menu. Players must complete each scenario before the virus gauge reaches 100% or they will die, resulting in a game over. When players take too much damage, they will collapse and crawl, prompting the virus to speed up faster until either the player uses herbs, first aid sprays or recovery medicines on themselves, or another player/AI partner helps them back up on their feet to slow down the virus. If the player succumbs to the virus in online, they will transform into a zombie and continue to control their character by attacking the other players until the mutated player is defeated or dies instantly after a certain amount of time has passed. The player and their AI partners will not transform in offline.

Capcom shut down the American servers for Outbreak on December 31, 2007, and the Japanese servers on June 30, 2011, ending official online capabilities.

== Plot ==
The beginning of Outbreak is set a couple days after the initial outbreak of the T-virus in Raccoon City, moments before the crisis further escalates into complete chaos. The game starts with the eight characters in Jack's Bar, who are unaware of what is happening until a lone zombie wanders into the bar and attacks one of the employees named Will. Soon after, the characters must escape the bar and make it through the city to safety. The game ends in the final moments of the same incident, with the player attempting to escape Raccoon City before the U.S. government launches a missile strike to eliminate the threat posed by the T-virus. The player controls one of eight characters with gameplay events transpiring across various regions of Raccoon City and span over a period of several days.

=== Playable characters ===
- Kevin Ryman (voiced by Jacob Barker) - A member of the Raccoon City Police Department. Kevin applied for the Special Tactics and Rescue Service (S.T.A.R.S.), but failed because of his carefree attitude. He is an accomplished marksman. Kevin was a regular at Jack's Bar and was there when the outbreak began. He has a "pot shot" ability that allows him to perform more general bullet damage than anyone else and is an all rounder who begins with his own weapon.
- David King (voiced by Jay Christie) - A handyman at Raccoon City, who is able to create weapons using his tools. He was drinking at Jack's Bar before the outbreak begins. His age was unknown. He can fix weapons or create new ones if the player finds material.
- Mark Wilkins (voiced by Vittorio Altomare) - A veteran of the Vietnam War. He settled down in Raccoon City with his wife and son. At the time of the outbreak, Mark was employed as a security guard. He was eating at Jack's Bar with a co-worker when the story begins. He has the most HP out of the starting cast, not counting secret unlockables, but he cannot hide in certain places teammates could.
- Alyssa Ashcroft (voiced by Sarah Carver) - An investigative reporter of the Raccoon Press. She had her memory suppressed by an Umbrella Researcher to cover-up an incident in the Arklay Mountains. She can pick locks and access areas teammates cannot and has a weaker version of Kevin's pot shot ability. Ashcroft is the only confirmed survivor of the cast, with her name appearing in Resident Evil 7 as the author of a 2016 newspaper article, and appears in Resident Evil Requiem (voiced and motion capture by Jane Perry) during flashbacks depicting events eight years prior to the start of the game. She is the mother of Grace Ashcroft, who is a playable protagonist in Requiem.
- Cindy Lennox (voiced by Ieva Lucs) - A waitress at Jack's Bar. She was in Jack's Bar when the infected attacked. She can hold more herbs than any of her allies and even begins with a usable supply but her other stats are below average and she has the second lowest HP of the starting cast.
- Yoko Suzuki (voiced by Laura Thorne) - A university student and former Umbrella Corporation employee. Her memories were suppressed about her time at Umbrella when she became a burden to them. She has the unique backpack ability that allows her to hold eight overall items, double that of everyone else's general items, though her other stats are among the lowest in the game, and she also has the lowest HP of the starting cast.
- Jim Chapman (voiced by Jay Christie) - A subway staffer of Kite Bros Railway who is easily scared. He has a unique "luck" mechanic and could play dead but also has the fastest infection growth rate of all the starting cast.
- George Hamilton (voiced by Walter Venafro) - A surgeon at Raccoon General Hospital. He can create medicine from herbs and other supplies, provided the player has the proper ingredients.

There are five individual scenarios in this game, which are not set in chronological order. The first scenario, "Outbreak", takes place at the beginning of the outbreak, as the police prepare to destroy the zombie horde using explosives.

In the second scenario, "Below Freezing Point", Yoko Suzuki leads the survivors to Umbrella's underground laboratory, which is featured in Resident Evil 2, where a rogue virologist, Monica, attempts to steal bio-weapons research and deal with her former co-worker, Yoko, until she is killed by a mutated William Birkin.

The third scenario, "The Hive" involves the survivors taking refuge in the Raccoon General Hospital, which is also featured in Resident Evil 3: Nemesis, while it is under assault from a colony of infected leeches.

The fourth scenario, "Hellfire", set the same day as "Outbreak", involves a group of survivors fleeing into the Apple Inn hotel that turns out to be on fire and swarming with lickers.

In the final scenario, "Decisions, Decisions", George Hamilton leads the survivors to Raccoon University to locate his friend Peter Jenkins who contacted George to meet him. They find Peter was killed by former Umbrella researcher Greg Mueller to prevent the creation of a vaccine called Daylight as a suppressent to the T-virus. Mueller is assassinated by U.B.C.S mercenary Nicholai Ginovaef. The survivors must defeat Thanatos, a tyrant released by Mueller, before escaping into a rescue helicopter. There are four different endings:

- "Remain Hopeful" is obtained by the survivors using Daylight to cure their infection, using another Daylight to destroy Thanatos, and carrying an extra Daylight for themselves.
- "Regretful" is obtained by the survivors using Daylight to cure their infection, but not using another Daylight to destroy Thanatos and not carrying an extra Daylight for themselves.
- "Chopper Zombie" is obtained by the survivors not using Daylight to cure their infection. They turn into zombies causing the helicopter to crash killing everyone.
- "Pair" is obtained the same way as the "Chopper Zombie" ending, but depending on the presence of certain survivors in the scenario (e.g. George and Cindy, Kevin and Jim, Mark and David, Alyssa and Yoko), they will have special interactions with each other as they choose to perish in the city's destruction.

== Development ==
=== Initial planning and cancellation ===
According to an interview with producer Noritaka Funamizu, the first concept of Biohazard Outbreak, as it was known originally, was known before the release of Resident Evil 2 in 1998. With growing interest in the concept of network gaming over consoles, Shinji Mikami, the director of the first Resident Evil, suggested to Funamizu that he should have a try. Early on in the design, Funamizu made a small multi-player mini-game in which the player must survive the longest time possible; the team decided to remove it due to its failure to encourage teamwork—players would instinctively run away from the horde and be slaughtered rather than help one another to ensure their own survival. They decided that what made Resident Evil scary was its lack of multiplayer, forcing gamers to play "on their own". The team then chose that the game would follow its own story like the other games in the series, but keep the option for multi-player. The game development was later put on hold.

=== Revival ===
Prior to 2002, Capcom decided to revive development of the game, based on the research gathered from the first attempt. Production Studio 1 began its development of the game, as opposed to Mikami's Studio 4. In February 2002, a Sony press conference regarding the PlayStation 2 revealed the game—previously unheard-of by the public, it had a working title of Biohazard Online. This led to confusion amongst the audience before Capcom released a statement confirming its existence. Resident Evil Outbreak was a part of an initiative from Capcom's Production Studio 1 to develop three network focused games on the PlayStation 2. The other games were Auto Modellista and Monster Hunter. Capcom's goal was to have at least one of the games reach a million sales. Both Monster Hunter and Resident Evil Outbreak eventually reached this goal.

The game made an appearance at Sony's conference on May 21 at E3 2002, with a video showcasing real-time 3D backgrounds (as opposed to pre-rendered); revealing four of the characters and demonstrating the ad-lib system and character communication. The "ad-lib system" was chosen over conventional microphone chat because the development team argued that it would ruin the atmosphere. Instead, limited chat options were used for conversation between users; a player would walk up to another and deliver a line from a particular conversational category (e.g. "help" and "go" categories). No solid release date was given at that time.

Later that year the game was renamed Biohazard Network. By October, eighteen different scenarios were in development, with even more in the concept phase. In November, Capcom released various pieces of media, showing eight playable characters and familiar-scenarios such as "Flashback". The occupations of the characters were also given.

In January 2003, further information was provided, mostly regarding interactive NPCs (non-player characters). Capcom boasted such actions as enemy NPCs who would attack the player and other ones that would run away when approached. Screenshots of "Flashback", "Underbelly", "The Hive" and other scenarios were released.

By May 2003, the game's title had been changed. This time, it had been changed to Biohazard Outbreak (Resident Evil Outbreak outside Japan), and the number of scenarios was reduced to the five scenarios. Another five scenarios did not make the initial cut, although they were complete enough to be featured in the E3 2002 trailer, and were developed into the sequel Resident Evil Outbreak File #2. In September, doubts were raised as to Outbreak's online game-play in Europe, but Capcom was adamant that it would at least try to find a way to solve the problem in time for release. Alyson Court, the voice of Claire Redfield from Resident Evil 2 (1998) and Resident Evil: Code Veronica (2000), directed the game's voice-over and motion-capture portions.

=== Release ===
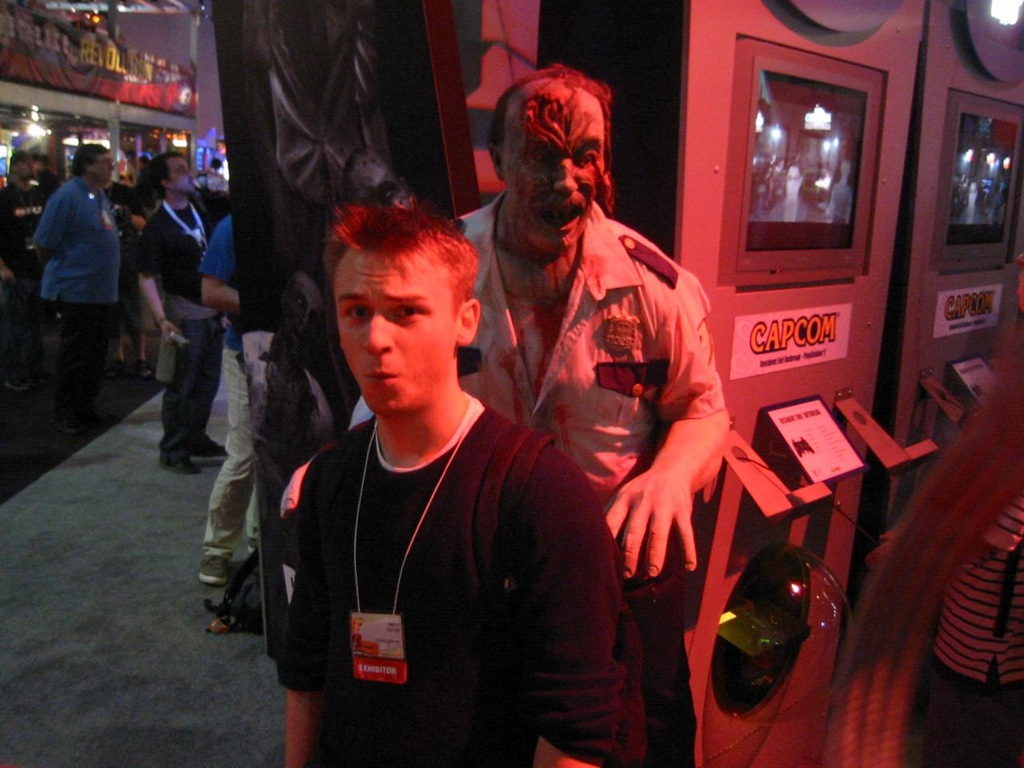
Promotion at E3 2003

The European release was heavily delayed, finally released in September 2004—nine months after Japan and the United States saw its release. Back in March Capcom had given in on securing Outbreak's network due to the numerous problems faced with establishing a network in a region simultaneously for dozens of languages, and securing service providers; as well as the usual PAL/NTSC differential.

Capcom announced on March 31, 2007, that they were shutting down the online servers.

== Reception ==
Reception

Aggregate scores
Aggregator	Score
GameRankings	70%
Metacritic	71/100

Review scores
Publication	Score
1Up.com	C+
Eurogamer	5/10
GamePro	4.5/5
GameRevolution	B−
GameSpot	7.2/10
GameSpy	3/5
GamesRadar+	9
GameZone	8.3

Outbreak received mostly mixed reviews. On review aggregator website Metacritic, the game received a total score of 71/100, and a score of 70% on GameRankings. 1UP.com awarded the game a "C+" in their review, describing it as "another typical entry in the RE canon", and a "competent game" with "controls [that] are actually functional and somewhat intuitive". However, they cited numerous problems with the game, notably Capcom's choice to not include voice chat in favor of the ad-lib system. They also found the game's five scenarios to be short, and AI partners to be "chock-full of repetitive and annoying sound bytes".

Eurogamer was disappointed with Capcom's failure to establish online support for the European market at a time when the PlayStation 2's online community was threatened with the expected rise in the Xbox's popularity with the upcoming release of Halo 2, stating that Resident Evil Outbreak was "designed from the ground up to be a co-operative multiplayer game for four players" and questioning if a network-less game would be of interest to players. Another problem was with the real-time "START" menu, which meant that file-reading and item-trading would make the player vulnerable to a random zombie attack, making the game "[feel] light in the story department" as a consequence of not becoming immersed in the environment. Long load times for the PAL version was also noted in the review.

By August 2006, Outbreak had sold 1.45 million copies.
