= Watashi no Aozora =

Japanese television series

- Genre: Drama
- Written by: Makiko Uchidate
- Directed by: Takeshi Shibata; Kei Suzuki; Masaya Ikeda; Akashi Yoshinaga; Tsuyoshi Inoue
- Starring: Tomoko Tabata; Michitaka Tsutsui; Takuma Shinoda; Takejō Aki; Kanako Fukaura; Tetsu Watanabe; Kin Sugai; Akira Takarada; Mariko Kaga; Shiro Ito
- Narrated by: Junko Kubo
- Theme music composer: Czech Philharmonic
- Composer: Yūsuke Honma
- Country of origin: Japan
- Original language: Japanese
- No. of episodes: 156

Production
- Executive producer: Akio Suwabe
- Producer: Masao Ieki
- Running time: 15 minutes
- Production company: NHK

Original release
- Network: NHK
- Release: April 3 – September 30, 2000

Watashi no Aozora (私の青空) is a Japanese television drama series and the 62nd Asadora series, following Asuka. It premiered on April 3, 2000 and concluded on September 30, 2000.

== Cast ==
=== Kitayama family ===
- Tomoko Tabata as Nazuna Kitayama
- Takuma Shinoda as Taiyō Kitayama, Nazuna's son
- Shiro Ito as Tatsuo Kitayama, Nazuna and Gen's father
- Mariko Kaga as Tamae Kitayama, Nazuna and Gen's mother
- Yūta Kawasaki as Gen Kitayama, Nazuna's brother
- Akira Takarada as Jōji Murai, Kento's father

=== Tonegawa boxing gym ===
- Michitaka Tsutsui as Kento Murai
- Tetsu Watanabe as Bazooka Tonegawa, a former champion and president of boxing gym
- Kanako Fukaura as Chiyoko Tonegawa
- Akira Akasaka as Prince Kondo

=== Musashi Ice Industry ===
- Shinya Yamamoto as Musashi Miyagawa, the owner and president of Musashi Ice Industry
- Kazue Tsunogae as Kyōko Miyagawa, Musashi's wife
- Reiko Matsuo as Noriko Miyagawa, Musashi and Kyōko's daughter
- Atsushi Onita as Muhomatsu, an employee of Musashi Ice Industry
- Kinba Sanyutei as Karuo Harukaze, an employee of Musashi Ice Industry
- Kin Sugai as Tome Hida, a Hirwayuken coffee shop mama

=== Kachidoki Elementary School ===
- Aki Takejo as Sayuri Takashima, a nutritionist at the school lunch kitchen
- Takaaki Itō as Gorō Hinata, a teacher

=== Others ===
- Kai Atō as Shōta Takashima, a truck driver
- Masao Kusakari as Jirō Amamiya, a famous cosmetics employee
- Nobuo Yana as Denkichi Tanaka, a tuna fisherman
- Kiyoshi Nakajō as Fumihiko Madenokōji, Muhomatsu's brother
- Kinō Sanyutei as Junnosuke Yoshimoto, an apartment landlord

Preceded by Asuka	Asadora; April 3, 2000 – September 30, 2000	Succeeded by Ōdorī
