= Happy Flight =

- Film poster
- Directed by: Shinobu Yaguchi
- Written by: Shinobu Yaguchi
- Produced by: Shintaro Horikawa; Daisuke Sekiguchi; Yoshino Sasaki
- Starring: Haruka Ayase; Tomoko Tabata; Seiichi Tanabe; Shinobu Terajima; Saburō Tokitō
- Cinematography: Tokushō Kikumura
- Edited by: Ryūji Miyajima
- Music by: Mickie Yoshino
- Production company: Altamira Pictures
- Distributed by: Toho
- Release date: November 15, 2008 (Japan)
- Running time: 102 minutes
- Country: Japan
- Language: Japanese

Happy Flight (Japanese: ハッピーフライト, Hepburn: Happī Furaito) is a Japanese comedy film directed by Shinobu Yaguchi about pilots and flight attendants. All Nippon Airways (ANA) backed the creation of the film. The airline sponsored a giveaway of Happy Flight DVDs and other items to certain members of ANA's mileage club.

== Plot ==
Kazuhiro Suzuki, a copilot who is trying to qualify as a captain, and Etsuko Saitō, a young flight attendant going on her first international flight, service an All Nippon Airways 747-400 as Flight 1980 from Haneda Airport to Honolulu International Airport. Suzuki feels stressed when Captain Noriyoshi Harada becomes his evaluator, while Saitō under Chief Purser Reiko Yamazaki. The 747 has been reported with malfunctioning heated pitot tubes, but Noriyoshi decides to postpone repair to avoid delays, relying on redundant instruments. Immediately after takeoff, which involved bird patrol to fend off surrounding pigeons, an alarm prompts Noriyoshi to switch to the backup pitot tube as their primary indication.

Inflight services commence shortly after. Due to the overbooked flight, not all passengers could receive their first choice of lunch between beef and fish; Reiko gives Saitō a lesson in dealing with demand imbalance: promoting the less wanted fish. She follows through with her first mishap, describing the beef as "plain and ordinary." She then fumbles orders for white wine, apple juice, and motion sickness drugs. She accidentally gives the wrong person the drinks and the ill passenger vomits onto her uniform because she forgets to give the drugs.

Meanwhile, the plane behaves erratically under Noriyoshi's command. Kazuhiro responds to passenger Ground staff confirms that the 747 suffered a bird strike; the engines ingested a bird without failing, but the bird also disabled the remaining pitot tubes, freezing the plane at cruising altitude. The aircraft has lost all indication of airspeed until they descend to below 22,000 feet, where air temperature is above freezing point. The captain elects to return to Haneda, now suffering from severe weather conditions. The flight crew and ground controllers then have to work together to land the plane, win the cooperation of the ill passenger, and determine if the maintenance crew was at fault for the aircraft's failure.

== Cast ==
- Haruka Ayase (Etsuko Saitō (斎藤 悦子, Saitō Etsuko))
- Tomoko Tabata (Natsumi Kimura (木村,菜採, Kimura Natsumi))
- Seiichi Tanabe (Kazuhiro Suzuki (鈴木 和博, Suzuki Kazuhiro))
- Shinobu Terajima (Reiko Yamazaki (山崎 麗子, Yamazaki Reiko))
- Saburō Tokitō (Noriyoshi Harada (原田 典嘉, Harada Noriyoshi))
- Kazue Fukiishi
- Ittoku Kishibe

== Reception ==
Mark Schilling of The Japan Times reviewed the film, giving it three of five stars. Schilling said that he "felt somewhat like a convict watching a prison film whose heroes are the trustees and guards — and feeling the filmmakers aren't getting the whole story."
