= Tomoko Tabata =

Japanese actress (born 1980)

- Born: December 26, 1980 (age 45); Higashiyama-ku, Kyoto, Japan
- Occupation: Actress
- Years active: 1993–present
- Spouse: Yoshinori Okada (m. 2018)
- Children: 2

Tomoko Tabata (田畑 智子, Tabata Tomoko; born December 26, 1980) is a Japanese actress. She won the best supporting actress award from the Mainichi in 2004 for The Hidden Blade and Blood and Bones, and the best actress award at the Mainichi Film Awards for The Cowards Who Looked to the Sky in 2012.

== Career ==
Tabata has appeared in films such as Happy Flight and Sankaku. She has also appeared in television series such as Watashi no Aozora and Shinsengumi!.

== Filmography ==
=== Films ===
- Moving (1993)
- Sabu (2002)
- The Hidden Blade (2004)
- Blood and Bones (2004)
- Hana (2006)
- Demon Pond (2005)
- Yellow Tears (2007)
- After School (2008)
- School Days with a Pig (2008)
- Happy Flight (2008) – Natsumi Kimura
- Sankaku (2010)
- A Liar and a Broken Girl (2011)
- Gokudō Meshi (2011) – Aya Kurihara
- Robo-G (2012)
- The Cowards Who Looked to the Sky (2012)
- Before the Vigil (2013)
- Angel Home (2013)
- Lady Maiko (2014)
- Children of Iron (2015)
- Museum (2016)
- The Day's Organ (2019)
- Dad, Chibi is Gone (2019)
- Wachigaiya Itosato (2019)
- Ora, Ora Be Goin' Alone (2020)
- Intolerance (2021) – Shōko Matsumoto
- Haw (2022)
- Insomniacs After School (2023)
- Aosho! Voices in Bloom (2025), Maho Iida
- Why Wait, Just Die (2026)

=== Television ===
- Watashi no Aozora (2000) – Nazuna
- Shinsengumi! (2004) – Kondo Tsune, Kondo Isami's wife
- Kitaro ga Mita Gyokusai - Mizuki Shigeru no Senso (2007) – Nunoe
- Nene: Onna Taikōki (2009) – Asahi no kata
- Midnight Diner (2009 Season 1 ep. 2) – Miyuki Chidori
- First Class (2014) – Shirayuki Kimura
- The Queen of Villains (2024) – Aiko Kurihara
- Shiawase wa Tabete Nete Mate (2025) – Otome Aoba

=== Dubbing ===
- Lilo & Stitch (2002) - Nani Pelekai
