= Shihori Kanjiya =

Japanese actress (born 1985)

- 貫地谷 しほり
- Born: December 12, 1985 (age 40); Arakawa, Tokyo, Japan
- Other names: Shi-chan; Shihorin; Kan-chan
- Occupation: Actress
- Years active: 2002–present
- Agent: Asia Business Partners
- Spouse: Unknown (m. 2019)
- Children: 1

Shihori Kanjiya (貫地谷 しほり, Kanjiya Shihori; born December 12, 1985) is a Japanese actress. She is nicknamed Shi-chan (しーちゃん), Shihorin (しほりん), and Kan-chan (貫ちゃん).

Kanjiya dropped out from Otsuma Women's University.

== Filmography ==
=== TV series ===
Year	Title	Role	Notes	Ref.
2005	H2: Kimi Toita Hibi	Miho Osanai		
2005	Keiji Heya: Roppongi Okashina Sōsahan	Aki Nanbara		
2005	Ōoku	Someko		
2007	Fūrin Kazan	Mitsu	Taiga drama	
2007	Hana Yori Dango Returns	Sara Hinata		
2007	Chiritotechin	Kiyomi Wada (later Kiyomi Aoki)	Lead role; Asadora	
2008	Aren't You a Criminal?	Sakura Morita	Lead role	
2008	Natsu Ando	Natsu Ando	Lead role	
2009	Love Shuffle	Mei Kagawa		
2009	Buzzer Beat	Mai Ebina		
2010	Ryōmaden	Chiba Sana	Taiga drama	
2010	Massuguna Otoko	Yoshino Machida		
2010	Keibuho Kenzō Yabe	Miharu Katsura		
2011	Bartender	Miwa Kurushima		
2011	Iryū Sōsa	Miyuki Oda		
2011	Hanawake no Yon Shimai	Sakurako Hanawe		
2012	Kazoku no Uta	Yoko Aota		
2013	Yae's Sakura	Takagi Tokio	Taiga drama	
2013	Apoyan: Hashiru Kokusai Kūkō	Hanae Baba		
2014	Ofukou-san	Tsugumi Chikura	Lead role	
2014	Yoshiwara Ura Dōshin	Teijo		
2015	Jo Kudoki Meshi	Megumi Kanbayashi	Lead role	
2015	Mother Game: Kanojotachi no Kaikyū	Yuki Kamiya		
2017	Naotora: The Lady Warlord	Shino	Taiga drama	
2018	Miss Sherlock	Dr. Wato Tachibana		
2019	Natsuzora	Mako Ōsawa	Asadora	

=== Films ===
Year	Title	Role	Notes	Ref.
2002	Shura no Mure	Akiko Inahara		
2004	Survive Style 5+	Kaho Kobayashi		
2004	Swing Girls	Yoshie Saito		
2005	Shiryō ha	Runa Nagao		
2005	Karaoke: Jinsei Kamihitoe	Shoko Inoue		
2005	Tantei Jimusho 5	Hitomi Shishido		
2006	Saikano	Akemi		
2006	Funky Forest	Gaba		
2006	Yoru no Picnic	Rika Goto		
2007	Ai no Rukeichi	Takako Murao		
2007	Shindō	Koon Kamogawa		
2007	Sai-ren	Koko Hirose		
2007	Hōtai Club	Shiomi Tanzawa		
2007	Always Zoku Sanchōme no Yūhi	Meri		
2007	Aozora no Roulette	Kanako Kurita		
2008	Paco and the Magical Book	Saori-chan		
2009	General Rouge no Gaisen	Shoko Kisaragi		
2009	The Code/Angō	Hitomi Shishido		
2009	Boat	Atsuko		
2009	Bokura no Wonderful Days	Wakako Fujioka		
2010	A Memory	Ringa		
2010	Parade	Kotomi Okouchi		
2012	Bokutachi Kyūkō A Ressha de Ikou	Azusa Soma		
2012	Paikaji Nankai Sakusen	Apa		
2013	Kuchizuke	Mako Awaya	Lead role	
2014	The Great Shu Ra Ra Room	Toko Fujimiya		
2014	The Snow White Murder Case	Yuko Tanimura		
2014	The Vancouver Asahi	Betty Miyake		
2015	The Mourner	Mishio Sakachiku		
2017	Kekkon	Hatsune		
2017	Homecoming	Mutsuko	Lead role	
2017	Hyouka: Forbidden Secrets		Special appearance	
2019	Little Nights, Little Love	Minako		
2019	This Old Road: Konomichi	Kikuko		
2019	Yūhi no Ato	Akane	Lead role	
2021	First Gentleman	Ayaka Fujimiya		
2022	Sabakan / Summer Days 1986			
2023	A Life with My Alzheimer's Husband	Mao	Lead role	
2024	Last Turn			

=== Video games ===
Year	Title	Role	Notes	Ref.
2026	Resident Evil Requiem	Grace Ashcroft		

=== Dubbing ===
- Journey to the West: Conquering the Demons, Duan (Shu Qi)
- Journey to the West: The Demons Strike Back, Duan (Shu Qi)
- Victorious, Tori Vega (Victoria Justice)

== Awards ==
Year	Award	Category	Work(s)	Result	Ref.
2008	32nd Elan d'or Awards	Newcomer of the Year	Herself	Won	
2014	56th Blue Ribbon Awards	Best Actress	Angel Home	Won	
