= Angel Home =

- Original Japanese poster
- Directed by: Yukihiko Tsutsumi
- Written by: Takayuki Takuma
- Produced by: Jin Yasuyuki; Ryuji Ichiyama; Emi Aoki; Hidemi Matsumura
- Starring: Shihori Kanjiya; Naoto Takenaka; Takayuki Takuma; Tomoko Tabata
- Cinematography: Shigetomo Madarame
- Edited by: Nobuyuki Ito
- Music by: Tomoyuki Asakawa
- Distributed by: Toei Company
- Release date: May 25, 2013 (Japan)
- Running time: 123 minutes
- Country: Japan
- Language: Japanese

Angel Home (Japanese: くちづけ, Hepburn: Kuchizuke) is a 2013 Japanese drama film directed by Yukihiko Tsutsumi. It was released in Japan on 25 May 2013.

== Cast ==
- Shihori Kanjiya
- Naoto Takenaka
- Takayuki Takuma
- Tomoko Tabata
- Ai Hashimoto
- Rei Okamoto
- Kyūsaku Shimada
- Yumi Asō
- Mitsuru Hirata

== Reception ==
=== Accolades ===
Awards
Award	Date of ceremony	Category	Recipients and nominees	Result
56th Blue Ribbon Awards	11 February 2014	Best Actress	Shihori Kanjiya	Won
56th Blue Ribbon Awards	11 February 2014	Best Picture		Nominated
