= Shin Yazawa =

- 矢沢 心
- Born: March 16, 1981 (age 45); Tokyo, Japan
- Other name: Shin Kobayashi (real name)
- Occupations: Actress, entertainer
- Years active: 1997-present
- Agent: Japan Music Entertainment
- Height: 1.6 m (5 ft 3 in)
- Spouse: Masato (m. 2007)
- Children: 3

Shin Kobayashi (小林 心, Kobayashi Shin; née Yazawa (矢沢), born March 16, 1981, in Tokyo, Japan), better known as Shin Yazawa (矢沢 心, Yazawa Shin), is a Japanese actress and entertainer who is represented by the talent agency, Japan Music Entertainment.

Yazawa graduated from Chiba Prefectural Funabashi Code High School. Her husband is K-1 kick-boxer Masato.

Yazawa debuted in the film Bounce ko Gals after passing the audition in 1997.

Her first lead role was in the film Scramble Hearts in 2004.

== Biography ==
Yazawa was born and raised in Tokyo, and went to elementary school in Fukuoka Prefecture. She returned to Tokyo for going to Hakata High School and modeling for the magazine, Egg. Yazawa later returned to Fukuoka and starting her entertainment debut.

On February 11, 2007, she married K-1 kick-boxer Masato after reporting that they were dating. It happened when Yazawa noticed Masato after she and her friends driven to the back of his house to travel to Mikane and became friends. Their marriage conference anniversary was held on February 13.

She is close friends with Eiko Koike from high school. They appeared in the drama, Naomi, and in the films, Kamikaze Girls and Yama Onna Kabe Onna.

On April 4, 2008, Yazawa became a Friday regular in the Tokyo Broadcasting System information program, Hanamaru Market.

== Filmography ==
=== TV series ===
Year	Title	Role	Network	Notes
1997	Hamidashi Keiji Jōnetsu-kei	Riko Yamashita	TV Asahi	Episode 6
1998	Kamisama, Mōsukoshi Dake	Asami Oda	Fuji TV	
1998	Nat-chan-ka		TV Asahi	Episode 11
1999	Emergency Room 24hours	Natsumi	Fuji TV	Episode 3
1999	Naomi	Miho Sugio	Fuji TV	
1999	Team	Aiko Sugino	Fuji TV	Episode 5
2000	Ikebukuro West Gate Park	Chiaki Hashimoto	TBS	
2000	Oyajii	Sumika	TBS	
2001	Omae no Yukichi ga Naite Iru	Momo Mori (Ke-chan)	TV Asahi	
2001	Shin O Mizu no Hanamichi	Nanako	Fuji TV	
2001	Kizu-darake no Love Song	Miki Tashiro	Fuji TV	
2001	Number One	Koharu	TBS	
2002	Home & Away	Akemi	Fuji TV	Episode 7
2002	Mama no Idenshi	Aya Uejima	TBS	
2004	Division 1	Emi Sasaki	Fuji TV	
2004	Gekidan Engisha	Miki	Fuji TV	
2004	Mother & Lover	Maiko Kamino	Fuji TV	
2004	Chushingura	Osugi	TV Asahi	
2005	Ame to Yume no Ato ni	Ruriko	TV Asahi	Episode 7
2005	Mei Bugyō! Ōoka Echizen	Osei	TV Asahi	Episode 6
2005	Rikon Bengoshi II Handsome Woman	Erika Uozumi	Fuji TV	Episode 9
2005	Dragon Zakura	Nozomi Yamamoto	TBS	
2006	Brand Keiji Yobi Kantei Sōsa-in Mami Kirihara	Momiji Hanasaka	TV Tokyo	
2006	Shimon Sōsa-kan Uhei Tsukahara no Kamiwaza	Chisato Sakamoto	TV Tokyo	
2006	Matsuko Kiraware no Isshō	Etsuko Kawajiri	TBS	Episode 3
2007	Kaettekita Jikō Keisatsu	Kaede	TV Asahi	Episode 2
2007	Fukumaru Asakusa Ryokan	Hiroko Sayama	TBS	
2007	Yama Onna Kabe Onna	Misato Toyokawa	Fuji TV	
2009	Ochaberi	Miho Yamazaki	TBS	Episode 1
2009	Tears in Heaven	Hitomi Shimizu	TBS	
2010	Asu no Hikari o Tsukame	Yuri Kitayama	THK	
2010	Hotaru no Hikari 2	Woman talking to video store clerk	NTV	Episode 1
2010	Tantei Kurabu	Michiru Kurosawa	Fuji TV	
2011	Dr. Ichiro Irabu	Eri Matsumoto	TV Asahi	Episode 6
2011	Last Money: Ai no Nedan	Midori Kanbe	NHK	
2015	Platinum Age	Saki Osato	NHK	
2017	Idol x Warrior Miracle Tunes!	Shizuko Kagurazaka	TV Tokyo	Episode 1

=== Films ===
Year	Title	Role	Notes
1997	Bounce ko Gals	Maru	
1999	Oyayubihime	Misa	
2003	Gūzen ni mo Saiakuna Shōnen	Nanako Kaneshiro	
2004	Kamikaze Girls	Miko	
2004	Scramble Hearts	Yoko Kurata	Lead role
2004	Walking with the Dog	Woman abandon dog	
2005	Tetsujin 28-go	Reporter	
2005	Hiroshi Tanaka no Subete	Delivery Miss	
2005	Shissō	Eri's mother	
2007	The Yakiniku Movie Purukogi		
2007	Kayōkyokuda yo, Jinsei wa	Yokota	
2007	Marriage Ring	Yasuyo Ota	
2008	Sakigake!! Otokojuku	Car beauty	
2010	Sankaku		
