= Grace Ashcroft =

Video game character

- Grace Ashcroft in Resident Evil Requiem (2026)
- First game: Resident Evil Requiem (2026)
- Voiced by: EN: Angela Sant'Albano; JA: Shihori Kanjiya
- Motion capture: Angela Sant'Albano

Grace Ashcroft (Note: Japanese: グレース・アッシュクロフト, Hepburn: gurēsu asshukurofuto) is a character in Resident Evil (Biohazard in Japan), a survival horror video game series created by the Japanese company Capcom. Grace first appeared in the 2026 video game Resident Evil Requiem as a playable character alongside Leon S. Kennedy. She is depicted as a technical analyst for the Federal Bureau of Investigation and the daughter of investigative reporter and Raccoon City survivor Alyssa Ashcroft.

Grace was designed as a timid, fearful protagonist to emphasize the survival horror elements. She is voiced by Shihori Kanjiya in Japanese and Angela Sant'Albano in English. Several video game critics praised the character, particularly for her characterization and relatability. Her altered appearance in an AI upscaling presentation by Nvidia was criticized and became the subject of an Internet meme.

== Concept and design ==
Grace was introduced in Resident Evil Requiem (2026) to focus more on the survival horror side of the game. She was designed as a timid, fearful protagonist, in contrast to the military-trained heroes of earlier entries. Producer Masato Kumazawa said Grace and Leon were designed to give Requiem contrasting modes of play: Grace's sections emphasize fear and vulnerability, while Leon's provide action-oriented relief. He described Grace as Leon's counterpart, a frightened newcomer experiencing a biohazard crisis for the first time. Director Koshi Nakanishi said the dual-protagonist structure lets the game alternate between Grace's slower, horror-focused sections and Leon's faster action sequences; this allowed the developers to show the differences in experience between Leon and Grace. Nakanishi noted Leon's sequences offer players a sense of release after Grace's chapters. Nakanishi called Grace "the biggest scaredy-cat in Resident Evil history", stating her gameplay highlights her inexperience with biohazard threats.

When pursued by a stalking monster, Grace visibly stumbles in the third-person perspective. In a GamesRadar+ preview, Ashley Bardhan noted that Grace's hands shake as she grips a revolver. Jasmine Gould-Wilson of GamesRadar+ described Grace's third-person chase animations as a touch reminiscent of a B-movie 'final girl'. The Requiem team initially struggled to achieve their desired visual quality for Grace's hair. A hair strand system for longer hair was developed by the Pragmata (2026) and RE Engine teams for the android character Diana. This rendering technology was later applied to Grace's hair in Requiem. GamingBolt reported that Capcom studied a professional wig to model Grace's hair, including upside-down scenes, and used Pragmata's Strand technology after struggling to reach the desired visual quality.

Grace is voiced by Shihori Kanjiya in Japanese and Angela Sant'Albano in English. Sant'Albano said she researched different types of panic attacks so that Grace's anxiety would feel neither exaggerated nor understated. Sant'Albano said she was not fully prepared for the overwhelming experience of portraying Grace, citing the character's desperate, fight-or-flight physicality as the most difficult aspect. As a young actor typically cast in familiar roles, Sant'Albano relished the opportunity to portray someone so different. The role required a new kind of physical storytelling, particularly in motion capture, where she enacted scenes of constant distress.

== Appearances ==
Resident Evil Requiem begins with Grace Ashcroft working as a young technical analyst for the Federal Bureau of Investigation. Her superior sends her to investigate a series of infections and deaths in Wrenwood, a city near the remnants of Raccoon City. Grace investigates the latest death at the Wrenwood Hotel. She is captured by Dr. Victor Gideon, who takes her to the Rhodes Hill Chronic Care Center, where he has overseen human experimentation and the creation of bioweapons. After freeing herself, Grace discovers the center overrun with bioweapons. She encounters Leon S. Kennedy, who is also investigating the infections, and they both escape.

Later, it is revealed that Grace is the adopted daughter of Oswell E. Spencer, co-founder of the Umbrella Corporation. Regretting his human experimentation, Spencer took in the orphaned Grace as an infant for atonement. Before dying, he transferred her guardianship to investigative reporter Alyssa Ashcroft. Gideon mistakenly believes Spencer used Grace in Raccoon City Orphanage cloning experiments and that she is the key to Elpis, a mind-control bioweapon. Having pursued Grace since her teenage years, he tracked them to the Wrenwood Hotel, killing Alyssa but failing to capture Grace. At Umbrella Corporation's ARK Laboratory, Grace releases Elpis, realizing it is not a bioweapon but an antiviral curing the subjects of Umbrella's experiments. As ARK disintegrates, Gideon and the mysterious Zeno are killed, and Grace and Leon are saved by Chris Redfield's team. Elpis is used on Emily, restoring her to a normal human, whom Grace subsequently adopts as her daughter. Outside the Resident Evil series, Grace appears as a cosmetic outfit in Fortnite Battle Royale (2017).

== Critical reception ==
Grace was praised by several writers for vulnerability, relatability, and contrast with Leon; her altered appearance also became meme material after an altered DLSS 5 presentation drew negative reactions, which Capcom producer interpreted as evidence that her original design had resonated. Scott Baird and Sam Smith of The Escapist called Grace a realistic protagonist who fears monsters, contrasting her with Leon's action-hero persona. In a GamesRadar+ preview, Ashley Bardhan described playing as Grace as an anxiety-inducing experience, emphasizing her fragility and vulnerability, while Jordan Gerblick argued that a pre-release trailer made a strong case for Grace as an anxiety-ridden protagonist suited to the series' horror direction. Gerblick described Grace as perhaps the series' most human protagonist and said her relatability heightened the fear factor. Dom Peppiatt of Eurogamer described Grace as a well-timed addition to the series and, based on first-game impressions, one of its most well-crafted characters. He also hoped that future DLC would focus on Grace, arguing that it would provide a counterpoint to the main game's later sections.

During Nvidia's Deep Learning Super Sampling 5 reveal, footage of Grace was used to demonstrate the technology, but viewers criticized the altered appearance shown in the presentation. It prompted negative reactions and 'DLSS 5 Off/DLSS 5 On' memes; Kumazawa later said the response showed that players had become attached to Grace's original design.

Angela's performance as Grace Ashcroft won her an award for Best Lead Performance at the Golden Joystick Awards 2026; she also received a nomination for Best Performance at the upcoming Game Awards 2026.
