= Sankaku =

- Film poster
- さんかく
- Directed by: Keisuke Yoshida
- Screenplay by: Keisuke Yoshida
- Starring: Sousuke Takaoka; Tomoko Tabata; Erena Ono
- Cinematography: Takayuki Shida
- Edited by: Toshirō Matsutake
- Music by: Yuri Sasaki
- Distributed by: Nikkatsu
- Release date: June 26, 2010 (Japan)
- Running time: 99 minutes
- Country: Japan
- Language: Japanese

Sankaku (Japanese: さんかく; lit. Triangle) is a 2010 Japanese film directed by Keisuke Yoshida. It was released on 26 June 2010, in Japan.

== Plot ==
30-year-old Momose and 29-year-old Kayo have been living together for two years. There is no longer any romantic feeling between them, like the one when they first started dating, and Momose in particular feels bored with his relationship with Kayo, and his attitude and words have become unfriendly. One summer day, Kayo's younger sister Momo, a 9th grader (15 years old), comes to stay with the two during her summer vacation.

Momose and Kayo are at the mercy of Momo's innocent pace. Momose is confused by the unusual atmosphere that Momo brings about. He is oddly bothered by the sound of Momo going to the toilet in the middle of the night, she wanders around in her loungewear that is practically her underwear, and she cutely whispers things to him, and he spends his days feeling uneasy since Momo's arrival. Furthermore, Momo compliments Momose's custom car, and while staring into his eyes as he brags about fighting, she whispers, "I like strong guys," stirring Momose's heart in various ways. Momose is gradually drawn to Momo's attitude.

Sensing a strange atmosphere between the two, Kayo puts Momo on edge. However, Momo just calmly asks, "Are you jealous?" One night, Momo stays overnight at a friend's house. While Momose worries that it may be a man's house, Kayo asks for a kiss, but Momose kisses her while thinking it's a hassle, and she gets angry, saying, "It's different from before, there's no love." As the end of summer vacation approaches, the night before Momo returns to her father's house, Momose is sad to see Momo go, and he instinctively hugs her. Furthermore, that night, Momose can't sleep and goes to the bathroom, and when Momo wakes up, they naturally kiss.

Even after Momo returns to her father's house, Momose's head is full of Momo, and he ends up fighting with Kayo. When Kayo tells Momose that she can't be with him, Momose breaks up with her and runs out of the house. Even after breaking up with Kayo, Momose continues to call Momo, but Momo never answers.

Meanwhile, Kayo is unable to let go of her feelings for Momose. She makes excuses to go to Momose's workplace and keeps contacting him, even though Momose finds it annoying. Kayo, who has regrets about this, decides to go back to her father's house. Meanwhile, Momose, driven by the urge to see Momo, drives to her father's house where Kayo lives, too.

Early in the morning, while Momose is waiting in the car near Kayo's father's house, Momo appears on her boyfriend's bicycle, with him riding with her. Momo approaches Momose to say hello, but after explaining about Momose to her boyfriend, the boyfriend warns Momose not to follow Momo around and throws him down several times with a judo technique. Momo also asks Momose not to call her again.

As Momose continues to hang around in front of Kayo's parents' house, Kayo appears on her way home from shopping. Seeing Kayo looking surprised and suspicious, Momose crouches down and repeatedly laments his own foolishness. Momose then tries to tell Kayo that he wants to start over with her, but at that moment Momo's boyfriend appears again and warns him again not to get close to Momo. Kayo is still unable to comprehend the situation, but Momose, unable to bear the awkward atmosphere, drives off in his car.

The next morning, when Kayo and Momo go outside to take out the trash, Momose is in front of the house and after looking at the two of them in turn, he tries to say something to Kayo, and the film ends before he says something.

== Cast ==
- Sousuke Takaoka as MOMOSE
- Erena Ono as Momo ENOMOTO
- Tomoko Tabata as Kayo ENOMOTO
- Yuko Oshima as girlfriend of Momo's senior's
- Shin Yazawa as Kayo's one and only friend who solicits Kayo into some "network business"
- Taiga as Momo's boyfriend
- Yutaka Mishima as the manager of the fishing gear store
- Hajime Taniguchi as employee at the fishing gear store
- Manabu Yazaki as the boss of Kurita
- Masaaki Akahori as police detective
- Tomoya Naito as the father of Kayo and Momo
