= Senkaku Shrine =

Shinto shrine in Okinawa Prefecture, Japan

Senkaku Jinja
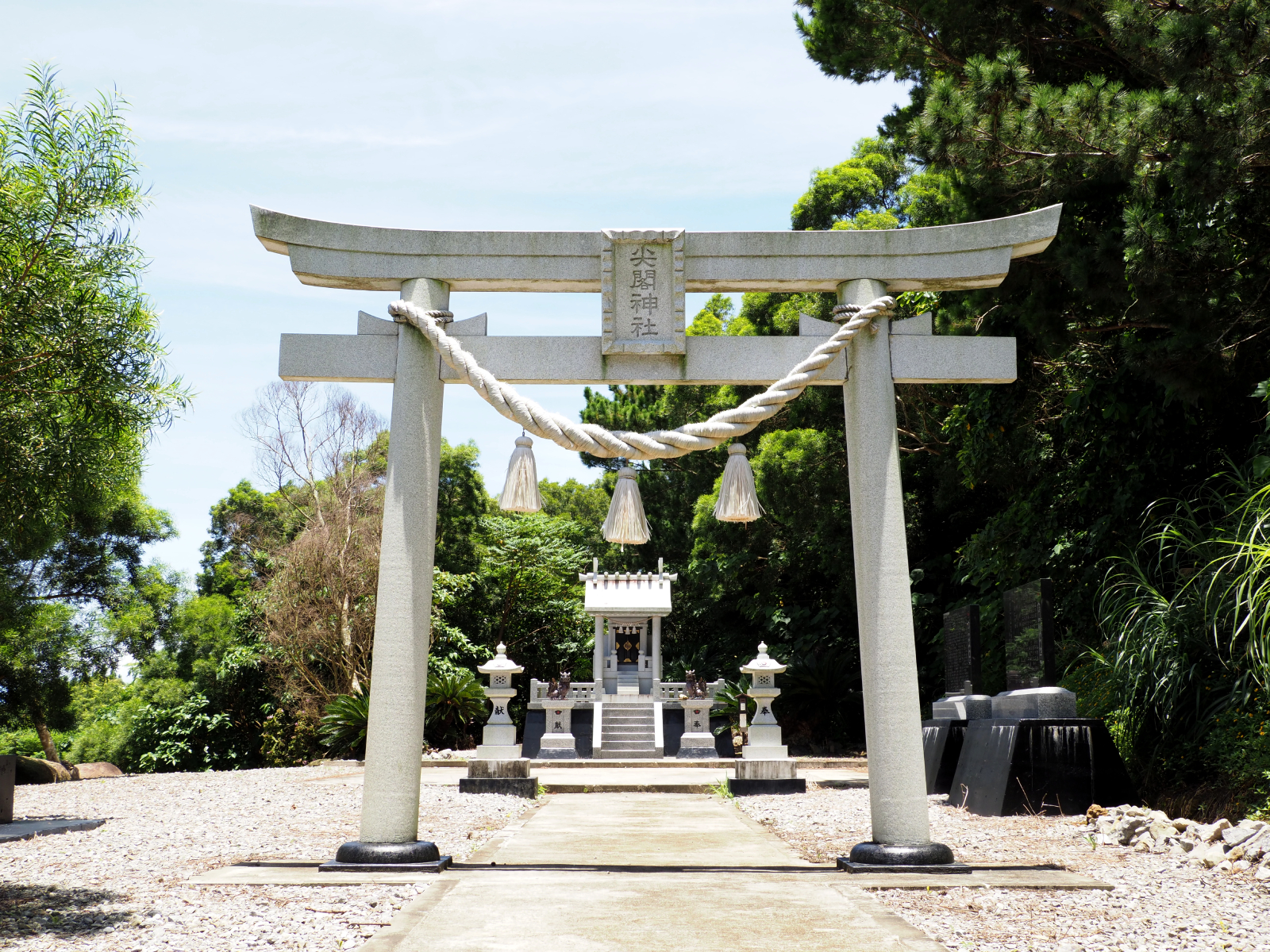

- Location within Japan

Religion
- Affiliation: Shinto
- Deity: Amaterasu

Location
- Location: Uotsuri-jima, Senkaku Islands
- Coordinates: 25.7425°N 123.4714°E

Architecture
- Established: 2000

Senkaku Jinja (尖閣神社) is a Shinto shrine located on Uotsuri-jima in the Senkaku Islands, Japan. The shrine is dedicated to Amaterasu.

The shrine was founded on April 20, 2000 and serves to pray for the safe passage of all boats through the Senkaku Islands and the East China Sea. Construction was led by Nihon Seinensha, a right-wing organization affiliated with the Sumiyoshi-kai, and wooden hokora were also constructed. When the shrine was founded, it was the first time since the end of World War II that a kannushi had been on the island. Every year, the two lighthouses built by Seinensha on the island are inspected and serviced, and during this time a yearly festival occurs, and prayers are issued for safe passage. In 2006, Seinensha donated the lighthouses to the government and they are now a national property administered by the Japan Coast Guard.

In March 2004, several Chinese activists illegally landed on the island. Seinensha reported the incident to the Okinawa Police, who arrested the activists and made a damage report. Afterwards, Seinensha rebuilt the hokora and erected a plinth with the words "Senkaku Jinja" written on it. The hokora and plinth are built of solid granite.
