= Resident Evil Requiem =

2026 video game

- Cover art depicting Leon and Grace
- Developer: Capcom (Note: Additional work and development support by K2 Inc, M-Two, and Redworks)
- Publisher: Capcom
- Director: Koshi Nakanishi
- Producers: Masachika Kawata; Masato Kumazawa
- Designers: Keiji Teranishi; Kenji Fukasawa
- Programmer: Masaharu Kamo
- Artist: Tomonori Takano
- Writer: Haris Orkin
- Composers: Nao Sato; Masahiro Ohki; Shigeyuki Kameda; (Note: Additional composer Joseph Holiday)
- Series: Resident Evil
- Engine: RE Engine
- Platforms: Nintendo Switch 2; PlayStation 5; Windows; Xbox Series X/S
- Release: February 27, 2026
- Genre: Survival horror
- Mode: Single-player

Resident Evil Requiem (Note: Known in Japan as Biohazard Requiem (Japanese: バイオハザード レクイエム, Hepburn: Baiohazādo Rekuiemu) and commonly referred to as Resident Evil 9 or Resident Evil 9: Requiem) is a 2026 survival horror game developed and published by Capcom. It is the ninth main game in the Resident Evil series, following Resident Evil Village (2021). It features a new playable character, the FBI analyst Grace Ashcroft, who investigates a series of mysterious deaths involving the survivors of the Raccoon City incident with the aid of the federal agent Leon S. Kennedy.

Gameplay alternates between Grace and Leon. Grace's sections continue the survival horror gameplay of Resident Evil 7: Biohazard (2017) and Resident Evil Village. Leon's sections are action oriented, similar to games such as Resident Evil 4 (2005). Both characters can be played from first-person or third-person perspectives.

Announced in July 2024 and unveiled at Summer Game Fest in June 2025, Requiem was directed by Koshi Nakanishi, the director of Resident Evil 7. It was conceived as an open-world online multiplayer game, but by 2021 it had shifted to a more conventional single-player game. Requiem was developed with the RE Engine and was the first Resident Evil game designed for ninth-generation consoles. It marked Leon's first major appearance since Resident Evil 6 (2012), and he was redesigned to appear older.

Requiem was released for Nintendo Switch 2, PlayStation 5, Windows, and Xbox Series X/S on February 27, 2026, to critical acclaim. Critics praised the dark tone, story, atmosphere, and balance between survival horror and action. Requiem sold five million copies in five days and more than eight million copies within six months, becoming the fastest-selling Resident Evil game.

== Gameplay ==
Resident Evil Requiem is a single-player survival horror game in which the player controls FBI analyst Grace Ashcroft and DSO agent Leon S. Kennedy. The story alternates between characters, similar to Resident Evil: Revelations (2012) and Resident Evil: Revelations 2 (2015).

Grace's sections focus on survival horror with limited resources, requiring the player to be more cautious. Her gameplay involves evading threats, solving puzzles, and managing limited inventory slots with various supply boxes to stow items in. Grace is occasionally pursued by a monster known as the Girl. It is immune to normal damage and must be avoided, similarly to Mr. X from Resident Evil 2 (1998) or Lady Dimitrescu from Resident Evil Village (2021). The player can crouch and sneak and hide under objects such as tables. However, the monster can also stalk the player through walls and ceilings, and must be brought into light to damage it. Grace can distract enemies by collecting and throwing glass bottles found throughout the environment. The player can use a lighter or flashlight to illuminate dark areas, though this attracts the attention of the Girl. On the Standard (Classic) or Insanity difficulty modes, Grace must use ink ribbons to save progress at typewriters (additionally serving as checkpoints upon death) with few auto-saves in her sections.

Leon's sections focus on action, incorporating various firearms, takedowns, and more abundant resources to neutralize zombie enemies. In addition to his hatchet melee weapon with limited durability for parrying incoming enemy attacks, Leon can pick up enemy weapons and use them against them. Leon manages his inventory through a briefcase that can stow items if there is enough space for them instead of a finite amount of slots. Additionally, he can find BSAA containers to obtain new items or upgrade weapons from depositing treasures and killing enemies. Leon also occasionally fights large monsters in more traditional boss battles.

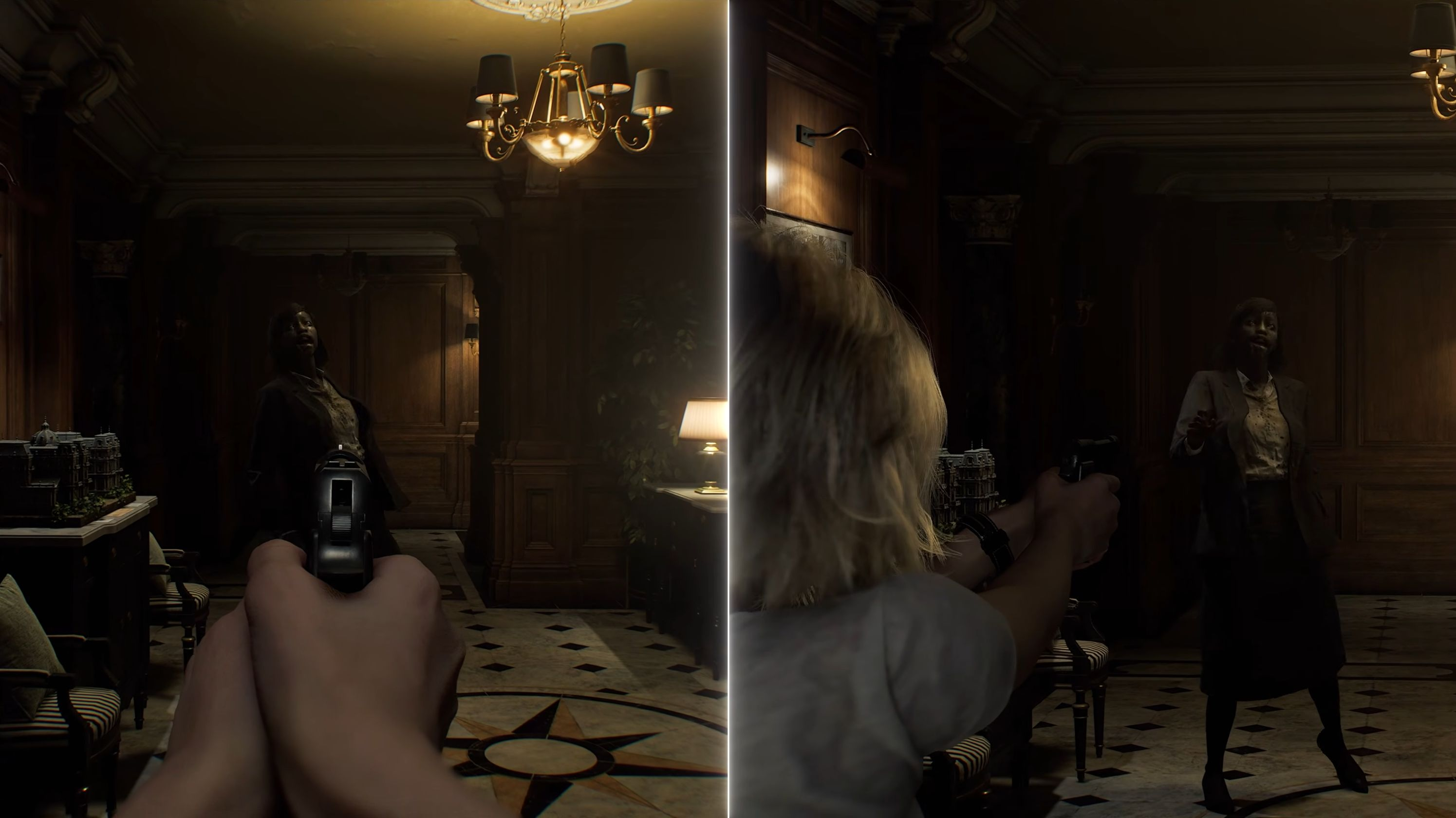
Comparison between the first-person perspective, emphasizing immersion and environmental detail, and the third-person perspective, showing the over the shoulder combat camera

During gameplay, the player can alternate between the first person and third person viewpoint of the playable characters. These default perspectives vary in character, with the chapters by Grace in the first-person perspective and Leon in the third-person perspective. Capcom intended the first-person view to provide a more tense and realistic experience, with the third-person view for those who prefer action gameplay.

On March 27, 2026, Capcom released an update that included Photo Mode. Similar to the Photo Mode from Resident Evil Village and accessible from the pause menu, players can view the in-game scene at the moment of pausing and adjust camera positioning, angles, zoom, focus, as well as modify character poses, facial expression, and other visual elements. Stickers, frames, and other filters can also be applied before players take a screenshot.

== Synopsis ==
=== Setting ===
The story of Requiem is set in October 2026, 28 years after the destruction of Raccoon City. (Note: As depicted in Resident Evil 3: Nemesis (1999) and Resident Evil 3 (2020)) It follows FBI intelligence analyst Grace Ashcroft (Angela Sant'Albano / Shihori Kanjiya), the daughter of Resident Evil Outbreak (2003) protagonist Alyssa Ashcroft (Jane Perry / Kikuko Fujimoto), and, secondarily, Division of Security Operations (DSO) agent Leon S. Kennedy (Nick Apostolides / Toshiyuki Morikawa), a protagonist introduced in Resident Evil 2. Capcom described Grace as an introverted bookworm who feels powerless due to not being proficient in combat, unlike Resident Evil protagonists such as Claire Redfield or Jill Valentine. Leon is supported by Sherry Birkin (Eden Riegel / Maaya Sakamoto), a fellow DSO agent whom he rescued from Raccoon City's destruction when she was a child. (Note: As depicted in Resident Evil 2 (1998) and Resident Evil 2 (2019)) Grace also encounters Emily (Emma Rose Creaner / Misa Segawa), a blind girl who was taken captive and experimented on.

Grace and Leon are opposed by Victor Gideon (Antony Byrne / Yutaka Aoyama), a former Umbrella Corporation scientist seeking to carry out the will of its deceased founder Oswell E. Spencer (Note: Spelled in-game as Ozwell Spencer, despite historically being Oswell in other Resident Evil games) (James Clyde / Ryūsei Nakao), and Zeno (Craig Burnatowski / Shunsuke Takeuchi), an agent of the Connections crime syndicate who resembles Albert Wesker. Major locations include the condemned Wrenwood Hotel, the Rhodes Hill Chronic Care Center, and the ruins of Raccoon City.

=== Plot ===
FBI analyst Grace Ashcroft investigates mysterious deaths among survivors of the Raccoon City incident caused by lingering T-virus mutations known as Raccoon City Syndrome (RCS). She is assigned to inspect a victim discovered in the derelict Wrenwood Hotel, where her mother, Alyssa, was murdered eight years earlier. Inside the hotel, Grace recovers a data disk left by Alyssa. She is abducted by former Umbrella scientist Victor Gideon, who has been searching for her. DSO agent Leon Kennedy, who is suffering from RCS, separately investigates the deaths. He arrives and sees Victor, who infects nearby civilians with the T-virus, triggering a zombie outbreak that allows him to escape with Grace to the Rhodes Hill Chronic Care Center. Leon's handler, Sherry Birkin, helps track Victor's location.

Grace awakens in Rhodes Hill and escapes confinement, but is stalked by a giant mutant known as the Girl. Leon arrives as Victor infects the staff and patients with a mutated strain of the T-virus, transforming them into zombies, and seals the facility, separating Grace and Leon. Grace navigates the hospital and frees a young blind girl named Emily. Grace and Leon learn that Victor is obsessed with obtaining Elpis—a bioweapon created by his deceased mentor Oswell Spencer—and that Grace is somehow essential to accomplishing this. Grace attempts to escape with Emily, but Emily is gravely wounded in the process. Grace kills the Girl by exposing her to daylight, but Emily mutates into a monster, and Leon seemingly kills her, devastating Grace. She abandons Leon and leaves the facility with Victor and his benefactor, a representative of the Connections named Zeno.

Leon and Sherry track Grace, Victor, and Zeno to the quarantined ruins of Raccoon City. Zeno tells Grace that, based on Victor's interpretation of Oswell's incomplete research, he believes Elpis is Oswell's ultimate weapon—a highly contagious mind-control virus—and that Emily is one of many clones of Grace created during experiments to transfer Oswell's consciousness into a new body. Zeno reveals that the government missile strike used to destroy Raccoon City after the original outbreak was orchestrated by the Connections not to eliminate the infection but to conceal Elpis. He brings Grace to ARK, a former Umbrella facility hidden beneath the destroyed city. Meanwhile, Victor attacks Leon but is apparently killed.

Inside ARK, Zeno explains that Elpis is protected by a self-destruct fail-safe if an incorrect password is entered. He believes Grace is the successful result of Oswell's consciousness-transfer experiments and therefore knows the code. Leon rescues her, but they become separated as his infection worsens. Grace accesses a terminal and views the contents of her mother's disk, which contains recorded interviews Alyssa conducted with Oswell. He expresses regret for the damage caused by his creations and reveals that he adopted Grace as an infant—a normal child unrelated to the cloning experiments—before entrusting her to Alyssa. Realizing that Spencer's final hope lay in her, Grace deduces that the password is "hope".

Leon and Grace reunite and confront Zeno in the Elpis chamber. Grace unlocks Elpis, a potent antiviral capable of neutralizing all viral weapons. Unaware, Zeno injects himself with Elpis, inadvertently removing his enhanced abilities, while Grace uses it to cure Leon's infection. Victor returns, kills Zeno and, misinterpreting Oswell's intentions, vows to use Elpis to sow chaos and upend the world order. Victor activates ARK's self-destruct system, mutates into a Nemesis-like monster, and is killed by Leon. Leon and Grace are rescued by the BSAA's Hound Wolf Squad, dispatched by Chris Redfield.

ARK's exposure sparks a global scandal and new investigations into Umbrella, the Connections, and the United States government. Some time later, Grace has cured Emily with Elpis and adopted her, while Sherry is also cured of RCS. In the ruins of ARK, soldiers from an unidentified faction eliminate the remaining BSAA forces and retrieve their objective.

== Development ==
Over the course of its six-year development, Resident Evil Requiem changed dramatically. According to the director, Koshi Nakanishi, it was conceived as an online open-world multiplayer game, but was rebooted in 2021. The development team felt that "it wasn't what the fans wanted". The team also experimented with making a "genuine horror game with Leon" like Resident Evil 2, but felt that "people wouldn't want to see a timid Leon". The writer, Haris Orkin, worked on Requiem for two and a half years. Capcom announced that the next main Resident Evil game was in development on July 1, 2024, during a Capcom Showcase presentation.

At the 2025 Tokyo Game Show, the producer Masato Kumazawa revealed that a Nintendo Switch 2 version was not originally considered because the system had not been officially revealed yet. Following the team's acquisition of Switch 2 development kits, they tested the hardware by prototyping a port of Resident Evil Village. The porting process went smoothly, giving the team confidence to bring Requiem to the system. Capcom were initially skeptical that the Switch 2 could handle Requiem but was surprised by how well it ran. The developers experimented with implementing the mouse control function of the Switch 2's Joy-Con 2 controllers for aiming and camera manipulation, but Kumazawa said this "confused the gameplay". They settled on using the Switch 2's gyroscope feature.

=== Design ===
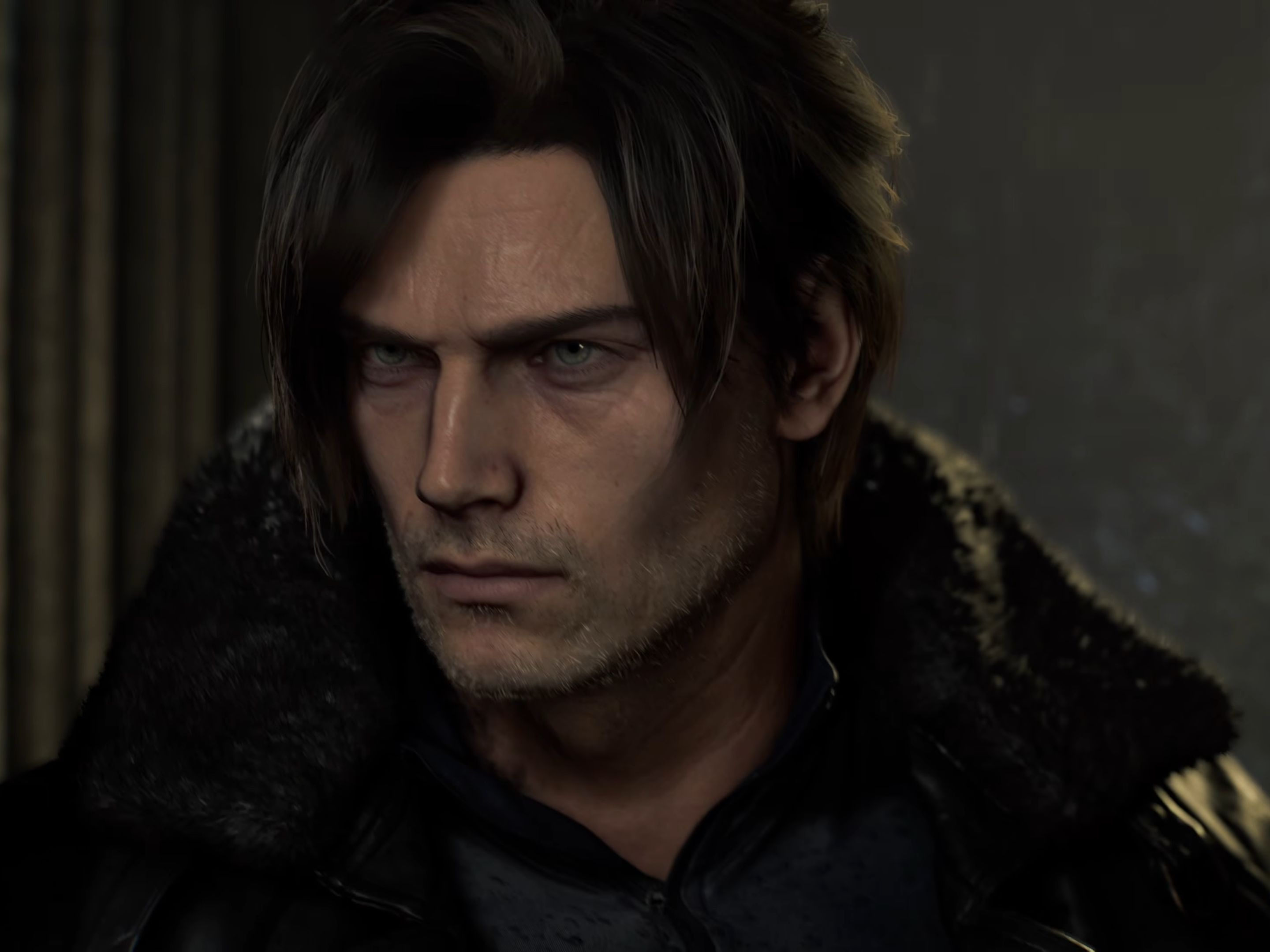
Resident Evil Requiem features a more mature Leon, described by Nakanishi as a "seasoned veteran".

With 14 years having passed since his appearance in Resident Evil 6 (2012), Requiem reintroduces an older Leon S. Kennedy. His design changed over the course of development, with input from women on the development team. Nakanishi said that they "would point out and comment on even the finest details like the wrinkles on his neck" and felt that they had created a design "that would make anyone's heart throb". The older Leon has been described using the Japanese slang term "ikeoji", which roughly translates to "an attractive or cool older man" and as a "hot uncle".

Capcom were "looking for a car that fit Leon", according to Kumazawa. They collaborated with Porsche to include a custom third-generation Cayenne Turbo GT. Capcom worked with the watchmaker Hamilton to create custom timepieces worn by Leon and Grace inspired by their characters. The collaboration was announced on January 15, 2026. Leon wears a Khaki Field Auto Chrono, an all-black chronograph inspired by tactical special ops. The crown imitates the knurled adjustment knob of a sniper scope and the chronograph pusher knobs take the form of bullet casings. An engraved wing at the nine o'clock position on the watch dial and on the case back embodies "prayers for the fallen". Grace wears an American Classic Pan Europ in a 42mm black case with a gold-and-black dial and unidirectional bezel.

=== Casting ===
On February 19, 2026, Angela Sant'Albano was announced as the English voice and motion capture actor for Grace. Sant'Albano auditioned in April 2023. It was her first performance in a video game and her first time working with motion capture. Nick Apostolides reprises the role of Leon in English after portraying him in the Resident Evil 2 and Resident Evil 4 remakes. Later on, Antony Byrne, Jane Perry, Eden Riegel, and Emma Rose Creaner were revealed as the English voice and motion capture actors for Victor Gideon, Alyssa Ashcroft, Sherry Birkin, and Emily.

=== Technology ===
==== Graphics ====
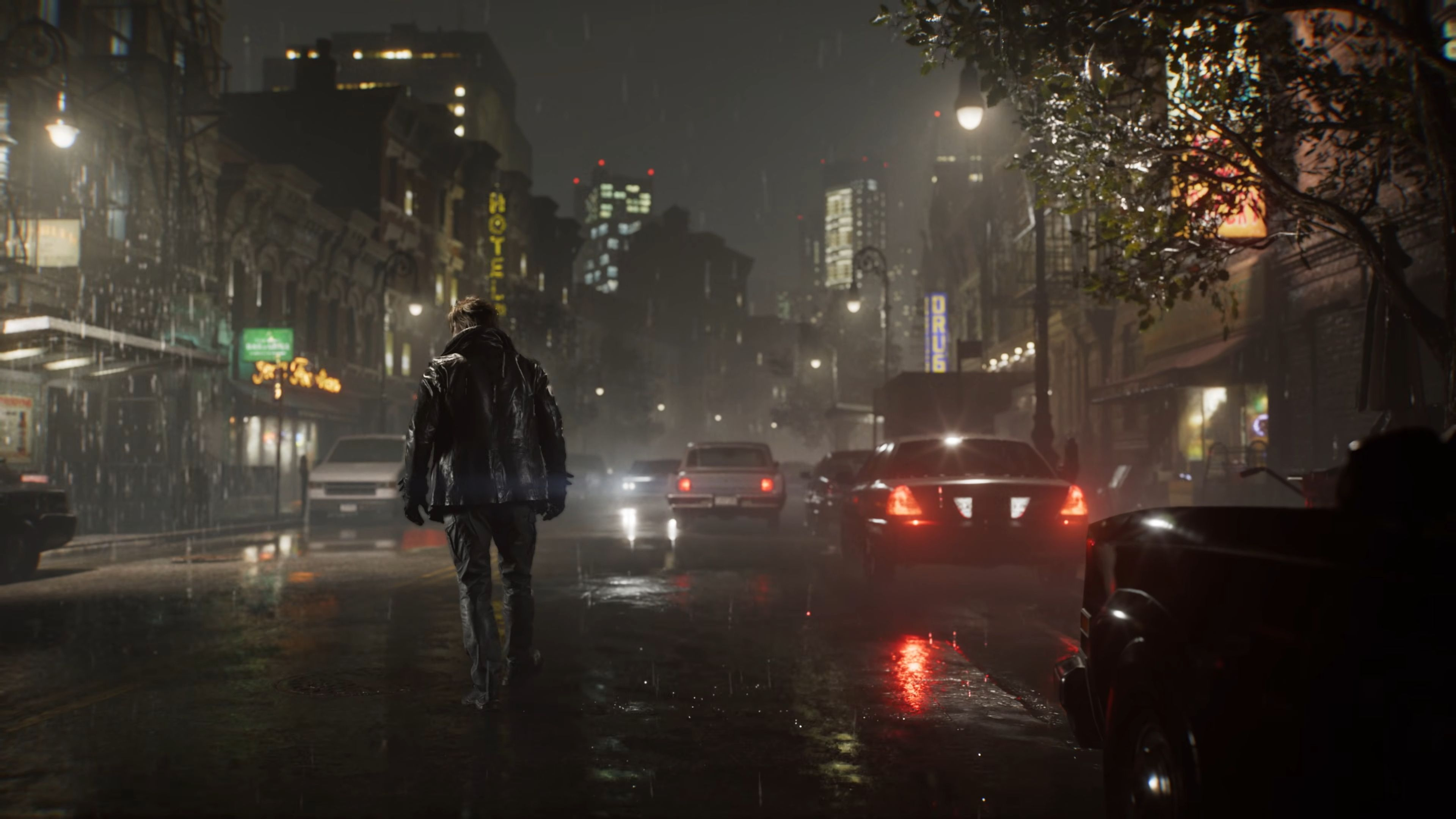
Resident Evil Requiem uses ray tracing for its lighting, shadows and ambient occlusion.

As with all Resident Evil games since Resident Evil 7: Biohazard (2017), Resident Evil Requiem was developed using the RE Engine. The first Resident Evil game developed exclusively for ninth-generation consoles, it was built with ray tracing in mind, unlike the cross-generation Village. On PC, Resident Evil Requiem features path traced lighting, including ray traced global illumination (RTGI) for multi-bounce indirect lighting, ray traced reflections, ray traced shadows, and ray traced ambient occlusion. It is the first Resident Evil game to natively support path tracing as Village only included more limited RTGI and ray traced reflections. However, path tracing in Resident Evil Requiem is only available on Nvidia GPUs due to forcing DLSS Ray Reconstruction when enabled with no fallback option for other denoisers. Shading on character skin makes use of subsurface scattering. The inclusion of both tighter first-person and wider view third-person perspectives impacted elements like LOD thresholds and shadow cascades relative to the camera.

For its hair rendering, Resident Evil Requiem uses RE Engine's hair strand system, a physics-based hair simulation system that aims to make hair look more natural and realistic by individually rendering strands of hair compared to the traditional rasterized hair cards technique. It previously debuted on shorter hair in Resident Evil 4 remake. The Requiem team had been working on improving Grace's hair rendering, but they could not achieve their desired visual quality. Development on the hair strand system for longer hair was led by the team working on Pragmata for that game's android character Diana alongside the RE Engine development team. This work on Diana's hair rendering in Pragmata was later transferred to Requiem for Grace's hair. The strand system allows luminescence to realistically shine through Grace's hair and her hair properly reacts in scenes where she is suspended upside down while strapped to a gurney.

On PlayStation 5, Resident Evil Requiem runs at 1080p internally with a spatial upscale to a 4K output resolution at 60 frames per second (FPS). Requiem is enhanced on PlayStation 5 Pro, running at 1080p upscaled to a 4K output at 60 FPS with ray traced global illumination and ray traced reflections. If ray tracing is turned off and the console is connected to a VRR display, it can run at a dynamic frame rate between 90 and 120 FPS. Capcom were impressed by the PS5 Pro's ability to run at high frame rates. Graphically, the PS5 Pro's high frame-rate mode is a match for the base PlayStation 5. Sony's second generation PlayStation Spectral Super Resolution (PSSR) upscaler debuted with Requiem on PS5 Pro with improved image stability. The first iteration of PSSR struggled with noise and artifacting when upscaling ray traced content in games such as Silent Hill f and Silent Hill 2. Xbox Series X uses the same graphical settings and techniques as the base PlayStation 5. The weaker Xbox Series S is more cut back, being rendered at 720p internally with spatial upscaling at 60 FPS. The strand hair system is removed and replaced by a simple hair mesh.

On Nintendo Switch 2, Resident Evil Requiem is rendered at an internal resolution of 360p in handheld mode and 540p in docked mode with Deep Learning Super Sampling (DLSS) upscaling and anti-aliasing to a respective 720p and 1080p output resolution. The lower 540p base resolution with DLSS upscaling bests Series S's spatial upscaling from 720p. It aims for a 60 FPS target on Switch 2. RTGI is included but ray traced reflections are removed and replaced with screen-space reflections instead. It has lower geometry and hair rendering quality, using hair cards that produce a rougher look than the RE Engine's more natural strand system.

==== Animation ====
The facial animations were captured using motion capture. Imaginarium Studios provided motion capture services, with Kate Saxon as the performance director. Motion capture shooting took place between 2023 and 2025. Shooting at Imaginarium was completed in three-week blocks followed by a month break. The inclusion of both first and third-person camera options necessitated additional animation for all actions. Exclusive animations had to be created for a wider third-person perspective that would not ordinarily be seen in first person. When being pursued by a stalking monster, Grace will visibly stumble in third-person. Reflecting her timid and fearful nature, Grace has animations such as shaking hands when using guns. These panicked character animations align with the "final girl" trope in horror films.

== Release ==
Capcom announced Resident Evil Requiem at Summer Game Fest on June 6, 2025, with a release date of February 27, 2026. The trailer was the show's concluding reveal. The trailer featured the devastated Raccoon City, including the police station of Resident Evil 2 and Resident Evil 3. Requiem was added to over 1 million wishlists across all the platforms it was set for release on. 3 weeks before the release, it reached 5 million wishlists. A playable demo was made available at the 2025 Gamescom and PAX West conventions in August 2025.

On August 20, 2025, a new trailer was released, showing more of Grace's backstory with a cutscene segment of her and Alyssa, as well as gameplay sequences. A third trailer premiered at the Game Awards 2025, revealing Leon as a second playable character, with more action-based gameplay.

Capcom announced the Nintendo Switch 2 version during a Nintendo Direct presentation in September 2025, in addition to Switch 2 versions of Resident Evil 7: Biohazard and Resident Evil Village. A themed Nintendo Switch 2 Pro Controller was also revealed, along with amiibo figures based on Grace and Leon. A Grace skin for Fortnite was released on March 1, 2026, granted to those who bought Resident Evil Requiem through the Epic Games Store. In February, Capcom released a live-action trailer that features Maika Monroe as a mother experiencing the Raccoon City outbreak in 1998. On February 12, a fourth trailer was shown at Sony's State of Play showcase.

On February 20, 2026, Capcom announced a collaboration with Yume Group to market a special game bundle with hanging fitness equipment. S. Ride used ten taxis with game promotion livery from February 23 until March 1, 2026, with the taxis located at Tokyo, Musashino, and Mitaka. On March 10, 2026, Nakanishi confirmed that downloadable content was in development. On May 8, the minigame "Leon Must Die Forever" was released. In an interview with Requiem's writer Haris Orkin in early October; Orkin confirmed that story DLC is in development.

=== Leaks ===
On February 17, 2026, IGN reported that some had obtained physical copies of Resident Evil Requiem from retailers early. On February 20, a week before the release, Capcom issued a statement imploring people to not spread spoilers online and saying it would issue takedown notices on leaked footage. On February 21, Hideki Kamiya, who worked on previous Resident Evil games, wrote on Twitter that those posting leaks and spoilers online were engaging in "a detestable act that destroys everyone's happiness and deserves a thousand deaths".

== Reception ==
=== Critical reception ===
Reception

Aggregate scores
Aggregator	Score
Metacritic	NS2: 93/100; PC: 92/100; PS5: 89/100; XSXS: 93/100
OpenCritic	95% recommend (Note: Based on 235 reviews)

Review scores
Publication	Score
Destructoid	9.5/10
Eurogamer	(PC)
Game Informer	9.75 (PS5)
GameSpot	8/10
GamesRadar+	(PS5)
Giant Bomb	4.5/5 (PS5)
IGN	9/10
Nintendo Life	9/10 (NS2)
PC Gamer (UK)	92/100 (PC)
Push Square	8/10 (PS5)
The Guardian	4/5 stars
Video Games Chronicle	(PS5)

According to the review aggregator website Metacritic, Resident Evil Requiem received "universal acclaim". Fellow review aggregator OpenCritic assessed that the game received "mighty" approval, being recommended by 95% of critics. Reviewers considered it a worthy celebration of the franchise's 30th anniversary. In Eurogamer, Matt Wales called it a "masterful bit of suffocating horror and a nostalgic, fan-thrilling victory lap for the legendary series". Dave Aubrey of Video Games Chronicle wrote that it felt like "a remastered greatest hits album". Jasmine Gould-Wilson for GamesRadar+ praised Requiem's ability to incorporate past foes and "bring the series full circle" without becoming "nostalgia bait", with the game ultimately "tying up the many loose ends" of previous entries to create the "most cinematic, bloody, surprisingly emotional moment for the franchise to date". For Elie Gould of PC Gamer, the return to Raccoon City is a "worthwhile venture" that does not denigrate what came before it.

Reviews commended the blend of horror and action. Game Informer wrote that "Capcom masterfully weaves Leon and Grace's stories together to ensure her horrors never persist for too long and that Leon's ditzy drive never overextends its enjoyment". GameSpot said Capcom had combined "two distinct experiences that each capture the best parts of Resident Evil", comparing Grace's sections to the horror of Resident Evil 7 and Leon's to the action-oriented Resident Evil 4 (2005). Scott Duwe of Destructoid praised the combination of action and horror and said "Resident Evil Requiem is an exceptionally well-made nostalgia romp that elevates everything that makes the series special".

Dave Aubrey of Video Games Chronicle praised the Rhodes Hill Care Center as "genuinely fantastic" and among the best areas in Resident Evil, but felt that its parallels to Resident Evil 2's Raccoon Police Department made Requiem a "retread that does not live up to its inspirations". Kotaku felt that Leon's playtime ultimately overtook Grace's rather than being equally split, as she "takes a backseat in the latter half". Nic Reuben of The Guardian criticized a "run of damp squib boss fights" towards the end, but praised the performances of Sant'Albano and Apostolides for "some heroic heavy lifting".

=== Sales ===
On Steam, Resident Evil Requiem set a record for the best-performing Resident Evil game, reaching 344,214 players during its launch weekend, double that of the 2023 Resident Evil 4 remake. In the UK, it topped the physical sales charts with a bigger launch than the previous two Resident Evil games. 54% of the UK sales were on PlayStation 5, with 36% on PC, 6% on Xbox Series X/S and 4% on Nintendo Switch 2. Requiem sold five million copies in five days, becoming the fastest-selling Resident Evil game. By March 16, 2026, it had sold six million copies, making it the year's best-selling game to date. It had sold more than seven million copies as of April and sold eight million as of July. In Japan, 51% of Requiem sales came from physical copies.

=== Awards ===
Awards and nominations for Resident Evil Requiem
Year	Award	Category	Result	Ref.
2025	The Game Awards 2025	Most Anticipated Game	Nominated	
2026	2026 Fangoria Chainsaw Awards	Best Video Game	Won	
2026	Golden Joystick Awards	Ultimate Game of the Year	Won	
2026	Golden Joystick Awards	Best Game Trailer ("Evil Always Had A Name")	Won	
2026	Golden Joystick Awards	Best Lead Performer (Angela Sant'Albano)	Won	
2026	Golden Joystick Awards	Console Game of the Year	Won	
2026	The Game Awards 2026	Game of the Year	Pending	
2026	The Game Awards 2026	Best Game Direction	Pending	
2026	The Game Awards 2026	Best Narrative	Pending	
2026	The Game Awards 2026	Best Audio Design	Pending	
2026	The Game Awards 2026	Best Performance (Angela Sant'Albano)	Pending	
2026	The Game Awards 2026	Best Action/Adventure Game	Pending	
