= Rockman & Forte Mirai kara no Chōsensha =

1999 video game

- Developers: Layup Co., Ltd.
- Publisher: Bandai
- Composers: Toshihiko Horiyama; Naoshi Mizuta; Akari Kaida
- Series: Mega Man
- Platform: WonderSwan
- Release: JP: October 21, 1999
- Genres: Action, platform
- Mode: Single-player

Rockman & Forte Mirai kara no Chōsensha (ロックマン&フォルテ 未来からの挑戦者, Rokkuman ando Forute: Mirai kara no Chōsensha; lit. "Rockman & Forte: Challenger from the Future") is a video game published by Bandai and licensed by Capcom for the WonderSwan handheld system. The game was only released in Japan and is a part of the Classic Rockman series.

== Gameplay ==
Similar to the previous game, Rockman & Forte (which was eventually released as a Game Boy Advance title in the West, Mega Man & Bass), two characters are available for play: Rockman and Forte. Rockman plays in his traditional manner, where Forte deviates, as in the previous game, with a rapid fire standard weapon that cannot be fired while moving as well as the ability to dash (similar to the characters in the Mega Man X series) and double jump. The Robot Masters in this game do not exhibit a short period of invincibility after being damaged, allowing the player to continuously damage them where possible. A feature unique to the WonderSwan was a third set of controls located above the traditional directional controls, which allowed some games to be played with the screen oriented vertically. When selecting Aircon Man, the player is required to change their grip on the device, as the stage had to be played vertically. Finally, unlike previous games in the series, there are only five weapons to be obtained as opposed to the traditional eight; Compass Man does not surrender a weapon to the player upon defeat.

The Bolt system also returns allowing either character to purchase helpful items to be used during gameplay. Each character has access to both universal items like extra lives and exclusive items such as Rockman being able to summon Rush, Eddie, Tango and Beat while Forte can summon Gospel and Reggae (a bird-type support robot that last was seen in the 1993 Famicom game Wily & Right no RockBoard: That's Paradise).

The bosses included are the Grey Devil (similar to the Yellow Devil featured in the original Mega Man), this boss is featured in the opening level of the game. Then the player can challenge the following Robot Masters: Dangan Man, Konro Man, Aircon Man, Komuso Man, Clock Men, and Compass Man. The final boss is Rockman Shadow.

== Plot ==
Like other games in the Mega Man series, Rockman & Forte Mirai kara no Chōsensha takes place in the year 20XX. A group of robots from the future calling themselves the "Dimensions" attacked Symphony City, a city where people and robots lived in peace. Though without any witnesses, the one leading the Dimensions with overwhelming power is a robot that appears similar to Rockman, who calls himself Rockman Shadow. He is said to be a dark and wicked character completely obsessed with destruction. Rockman, who hears this news at Dr. Right's laboratory, ventures to the scene despite being under maintenance. At the same time, Dr. Wily sees Shadow, and to ascertain the mystery he sends Forte in the West). Eventually Rockman Shadow and the Dimensions are defeated and their plans put to rest.

== Reception ==
Reception

Review score
Publication	Score
Famitsu	23 out of 40

Jeremy Parish of 1UP.com called it the worst Mega Man game ever. The game was negatively received by IGN.
