= Mega Man & Bass =

1998 video game

- North American Game Boy Advance cover art
- Developer: Capcom
- Publisher: Capcom
- Directors: Hayato Tsuru; Manabu Takemura
- Producer: Keiji Inafune
- Programmers: Masatsugu Shinohara; Nobuhito Shimizu; Tadashi Kuwana
- Artists: Hitoshi Ariga; Yoshihiro Iwamoto; Koji Izuki
- Composers: Toshihiko Horiyama; Naoshi Mizuta; Akari Kaida
- Series: Mega Man
- Platforms: Super Famicom; Game Boy Advance
- Release: Super Famicom: JP: April 24, 1998; Game Boy Advance: JP: August 10, 2002; NA: March 11, 2003; PAL: March 21, 2003
- Genre: Action
- Mode: Single-player

Mega Man & Bass (Note: Japanese: ロックマン&フォルテ, Hepburn: Rokkuman ando Forute; lit. 'Rockman & Forte') is a 1998 action game developed and published by Capcom. It is a spin-off game in the original Mega Man series, and was originally released in Japan for the Super Famicom on April 24, 1998. It was later ported to the Game Boy Advance in 2002, and released internationally the following year.

After defeating the evil Dr. Wily many times, the robot hero Mega Man is called into action once again when a powerful robot known as King steals the blueprints to the creations of Dr. Wily and Dr. Light in order to create an army for robotic dominance over humans. Having learned of the threat, Mega Man's rival Bass decides to take matters into his own hands. Gameplay is similar to previous entries in the series, in which the player advances by completing stages and defeating bosses to acquire their signature weapons. Mega Man & Bass lets the player choose between either of its title characters, who play differently from each other.

Mega Man & Bass debuted on the aging 16-bit Super Famicom despite the series having already transitioned to the PlayStation and Sega Saturn with Mega Man 8. Several characters and sprites from Mega Man 8 were reused for Mega Man & Bass. Producer Keiji Inafune claimed Mega Man & Bass was created to target younger players who didn't yet own one of the more advanced gaming systems. The game received positive remarks from critics for its graphics and use of a tried-and-true gameplay formula, though many found the difficulty to be too steep. The game was followed by Mega Man 9 (2008), which returned to the graphical style of the early NES games.

== Plot ==
The story of Mega Man & Bass varies depending on which player character is chosen. It begins one year after the events of Mega Man 8 when a robot villain named King breaks into Dr. Wily's laboratory and then the Robot Museum to collect the data blueprints for the creations of Dr. Light. Dr. Light alerts Mega Man that he must go to the Robot Museum to confront this new enemy. Meanwhile, Mega Man's rival Bass hears of the new criminal's appearance and decides to prove himself the stronger robot by defeating King. Proto Man is the first to arrive at the scene, and King reveals that he desires to create a utopia in which robots rule the world over humans. King plans to create an unstoppable army using the stolen data, and invites Proto Man to join him. Proto Man refuses and attempts to attack, but King counters and slices his body in half. Proto Man then teleports back to the lab for repairs while King escapes with the data, instructing his minions to handle the heroes. With their own motivations, Mega Man and Bass set out to stop King's plans.

After vanquishing eight powerful robots under allegiance to King, the duo infiltrate his castle and engage him in combat. Proto Man interrupts the fight and again attempts to defeat King, but only manages to destroy his shield, allowing Mega Man and Bass to defeat him in battle afterwards. King questions why they fight so hard for humans when robots are the superior species. The pair explain that humans are the ones who created robots in the first place, which confuses King. The villain reveals that his creator is Dr. Wily, who then appears on a video monitor. When King asks the evil inventor why robots fight each other for the sake of humans, Wily strengthens his "brainwashing level" and restores his power. Mega Man and Bass engage King in another battle and defeat him. The castle begins a self-destruct sequence and the protagonists escape without King.

Mega Man and Bass confront Dr. Wily in his newly regained laboratory. When Wily is beaten, Bass demands to know why Wily deceived him. Wily explains that he created King simply to test Bass' abilities. Wily shows him written plans for making a newer version of King to join with Bass in this venture, promising that the two would be invincible together. Proto Man appears and immediately destroys these plans. Wily then demands Bass to destroy Proto Man, but Bass hesitates. Proto Man tells Bass that although he is a strong robot of free will, he can never defeat his rival because he has nothing for which to fight. Bass dismisses this and forces Proto Man to leave, saying that he will still destroy Mega Man to prove his cause. Meanwhile, Mega Man returns home, but he's sad for not being able to save King. However, his sister Roll presents him a letter from King, who has somehow escaped the destruction of his castle. King wishes to atone for his own crimes against humans and hopes for them to be friends if they were to meet in the future.

== Gameplay ==
Unlike Mega Man, Bass can fire rapidly in seven different directions. The player's health is displayed in the top left corner.

Gameplay in Mega Man & Bass is similar to earlier games in the series. It is an action game where the player is tasked with completing a series of stages while overcoming obstacles, solving minor puzzles, and battling enemies. Destroying the "Robot Master" boss at the end of a stage lets the player acquire its special weapon. In previous games, the player generally took on the role of the hero Mega Man. In this game, the player can choose to start the game as either Mega Man or Bass. However, whichever character is picked must be used for the rest of the file and cannot be changed. Mega Man is able to charge his shots to make them more powerful, slide and fire while he's moving. Bass is able to rapidly fire his arm cannon in eight directions, though his shots cannot pass through walls unless a certain upgrade is equipped and firing stops him in place when he's on the ground. Bass is also able to double-jump (jump a second time in mid-air) and dash along the ground (similar to X in Mega Man X). Performing both simultaneously lets him cross great distances by doing a dash-jump.

The stage structure is much different from other games in the series. After the introduction level, the player can only choose between three Robot Masters, with following stages being unlocked once the initial ones are cleared. Clearing one of these unlocked stages opens the way to a security room where the player must destroy a series of crystals with obtained Robot Master weapons. Bypassing all eight crystals opens the way to the fortress stages. In a similar fashion to previous installments in the series, enemies often drop bolts after they are destroyed, and these can be exchanged for various restorative items and upgrades. However, unlike in Mega Man 7, the game features a security cavern which offers a way to obtain large amounts of bolts without having to repeatedly visit stages. Some upgrades are unique to either character, such as Mega Man's ability to call on his dog Rush to search for items, Beat to receive a barrier that makes him temporarily invincibile and Eddie to receive healing items, or an adaptor for Bass to combine with his wolf Treble to temporarily fly. Also distributed throughout the introduction and Robot Master levels are a collection of 100 data CDs that contain information on prominent characters in the series. Most of the CDs are hidden either behind obstacles that need to be destroyed with a special weapon or accessed with a character-specific ability, making it impossible to collect them all on a single playthrough, as when the character is chosen in a file, the other character can only be used in another file. For example, some places are too high for Mega Man, who lacks the mobility options that Bass has, or too low and narrow for Bass, who can't slide, and a good chunk of the CDs can only be found by Mega Man by calling Rush and make him dig to search them. CDs collected in each playthrough are permanently placed in a database and remain unlocked after beating the game. Saved games are used in place of the series' traditional password system.

== Development ==
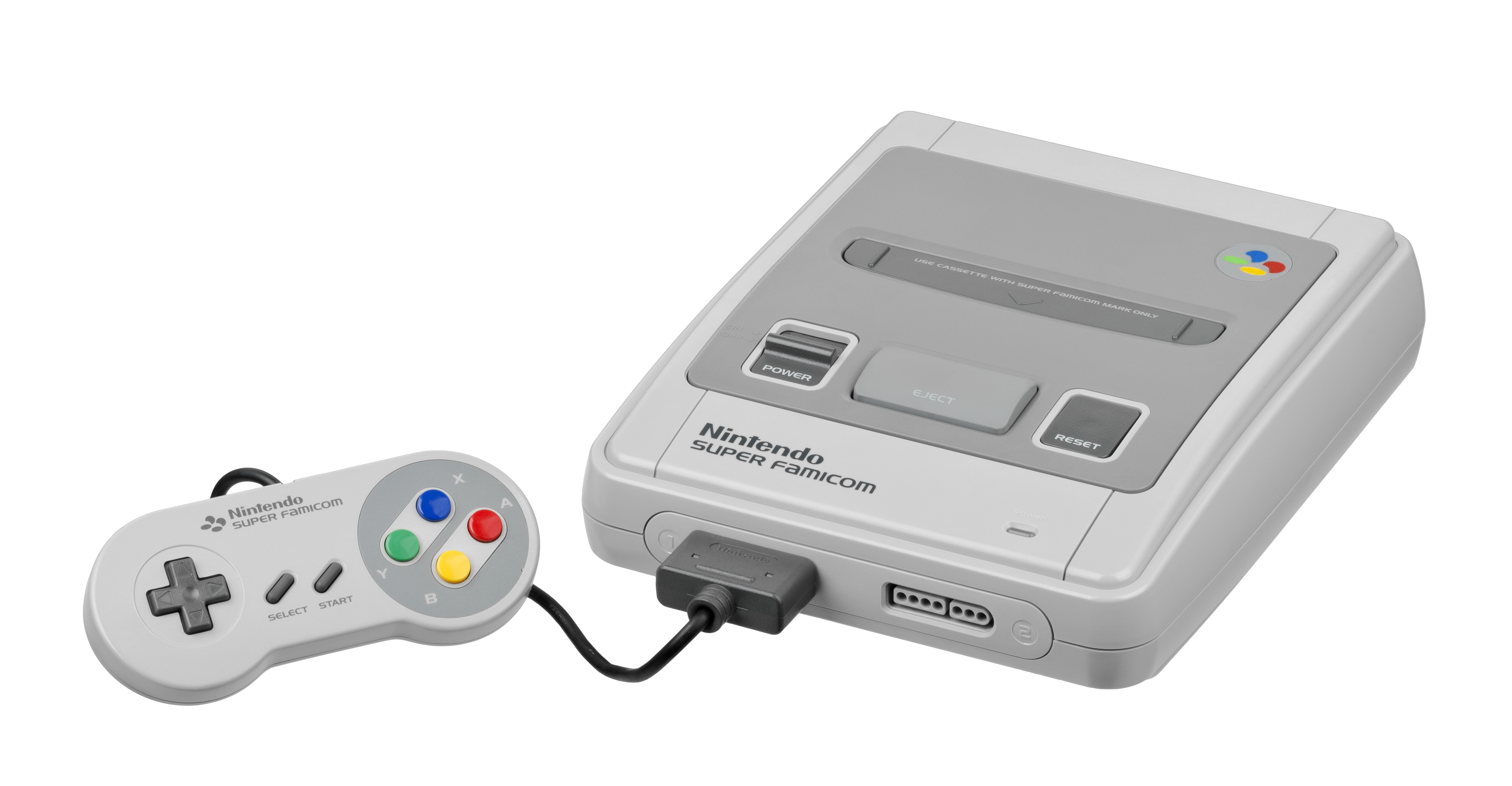
Mega Man & Bass was initially released for the Super Famicom.

Mega Man & Bass was developed for the Super Famicom after the release of Mega Man 8, which preceded Mega Man & Bass on the PlayStation and Sega Saturn. According to series producer Keiji Inafune, Mega Man & Bass was intended for younger players who still owned a Super Famicom and did not have the means to experience Mega Man 8 on one of the newer systems. "Even though trying to bridge out a new title on the [Super Famicom] was a little backwards at the time, we didn't want to make a half-hearted attempt at it," Inafune explained. The design team included several new employees, as well as members of previous Mega Man games. Inafune required them to make the game "as hardcore as possible". Designer Hideki Ishikawa recalled the development of Mega Man & Bass as "one big party". The staff attempted to create an original game while avoiding the "same old, same old [...] pitfall" that so many long video game series suffer and "had a lot of fun doing it".

Graphically, Mega Man & Bass reuses many of the same two-dimensional sprites and animations from Mega Man 8. Two of the eight Robot Master bosses in Mega Man & Bass, Tengu Man and Astro Man, are borrowed from Mega Man 8. The other six were newly created for the game by three character designers: Hitoshi Ariga, Yoshihiro Iwamoto, and Koji Izuki, who designed two characters each. The bosses were officially unveiled on a teaser page in the Kodansha magazine Comic BonBon. Each boss was given distinct characteristics so that they could be easily identified by players in both their aesthetics and personalities. Some of these characters had different names during their conceptual phase prior to the finalization of the game. "Blast Man" became Burner Man, "Freezer Man" became Cold Man, and "Coil Man" became Dynamo Man. Iwamoto originally denoted Ground Man as "Drill Man" despite there already being a Robot Master by that name in Mega Man 4.

The musical score for Mega Man & Bass was composed by Akari Kaida, Naoshi Mizuta, and Toshihiko Horiyama. Rather than create tracks together, each composer was responsible for their own songs, composing approximately a third of the soundtrack each. Each track was written in under a week, while the sound effects and music programming were outsourced to an external company. After the composers finished creating music, they were involved with debugging the game, which involved working over holidays.

Until its GBA re-release, it was one of the few Mega Man titles not localized for English-speaking countries. The company commemorated the 15th anniversary of the Mega Man franchise with the GBA version of the game.

== Reception ==
Reception

Aggregate scores
Aggregator	Score
GameRankings	79%
Metacritic	79/100

Review scores
Publication	Score
Electronic Gaming Monthly	8.5/10
Famitsu	24/40 (SFC); 26/40 (GBA)
Game Informer	8.5/10
GamePro	4/5
GameSpot	7.2/10
GameSpy	2/5
IGN	8.5/10
Nintendo Power	8/10
Play	80%
Ação Games	9/10
Super GamePower	4.8/5

The GBA port has received generally positive critical reviews, currently holding an aggregate score of 79% on both GameRankings and Metacritic. Most critics found the game to be a solid yet conventional action-platformer that successfully adheres to the classic Mega Man formula. Nintendo Power listed Mega Man & Bass as the 14th best GBA game of all time in its 20th anniversary issue in 2008. Electronic Gaming Monthly summarized that Mega Man & Bass is "one of the best action games on GBA" and "a great, if slightly derivative, platformer" with plenty of replay value due to the collectible CDs. GamePro was pleased with the game's fidelity to its predecessors when compared to the deviations made by the Mega Man Battle Network and Mega Man Zero series on the same system. GameSpy contrarily criticized its lack of innovation, declaring, "Anyone that hasn't tried a Mega Man game yet would be better advised to spend $15 on a new copy of Mega Man 8 on the PSOne rather than paying $30 for an inferior retread of the same game".

Many reviews also noted the game's high difficulty. Both Giancarlo Varanini of GameSpot and Craig Harris of IGN found that the game's bosses have very unpredictable attack patterns, thus making the battles extremely challenging. Harris additionally observed a heavy amount of trial-and-error for the levels themselves where the player must die several times before completing each one. He concluded, "[...] It's really the way Mega Man games have always been... and to be honest, with all of the annoying little deaths in the game, there's always that sensation after every failure that you've learned the challenge, and perseverance definitely prevails in this game".

According to Famitsu, Mega Man & Bass for the GBA sold 91,097 copies in Japan between its release date and the week of December 23, 2002.

== Legacy ==
A related game exclusive to Japan titled Rockman & Forte Mirai kara no Chōsensha (ロックマン&フォルテ 未来からの挑戦者; lit. Rockman & Forte: Challenger from the Future) was released for the WonderSwan handheld in 1999. The plot consists of the titular duo's struggle against an adversary named "Rockman Shadow".

As Mega Man & Bass was released directly after Mega Man 8 and it shares plot and gameplay characteristics with the rest of the numbered titles in the series, many believed it to be the ninth main game in the series; however, the actual Mega Man 9 would not be released until 2008. Inafune explained in an interview with the Brazilian magazine Nintendo World that the ninth installment follows the storyline of Mega Man 8 and that the worlds for Mega Man & Bass and Mega Man 9 are meant to coincide with one another, as evidenced by a schematic of Bass in the ending of the game.

In 2010, Bass was made playable via downloadable content in Mega Man 10. As in Mega Man & Bass, he is able to dash, fire in seven directions with his buster, and fly by combining with Treble.
