= Mega Man 11 =

2018 video game

- Developer: Capcom
- Publisher: Capcom
- Director: Koji Oda
- Producer: Kazuhiro Tsuchiya
- Designers: Takayoshi Miyake; Masakazu Eguchi
- Programmer: Naotaka Noda
- Artist: Yuji Ishihara
- Writer: Masakazu Eguchi
- Composer: Marika Suzuki
- Series: Mega Man
- Engine: MT Framework
- Platforms: Luna; Nintendo Switch; PlayStation 4; Windows; Xbox One
- Release: Switch, PS4, Windows, Xbox One: WW: October 2, 2018; JP: October 4, 2018; Luna: US: September 9, 2021
- Genre: Platform
- Mode: Single-player

Mega Man 11 (Note: Known in Japan as Rockman 11: Unmei no Haguruma!! (ロックマン11 運命の歯車！！, Rokkuman 11 Unmei no Haguruma!!; lit. "Rockman 11: Gears of Fate!!")) is a 2018 platform game developed and published by Capcom. The game is the 11th main entry in the original Mega Man series, and was released worldwide for Nintendo Switch, PlayStation 4, Windows, and Xbox One in October 2018. The game was ported to Amazon Luna on September 9, 2021. The game marks the end of an eight-year hiatus of new entries in the entire franchise, and the first new entry in the franchise not to be produced or supervised by Keiji Inafune, following his departure from Capcom shortly after the release of Mega Man 10 (2010).

The game brings back several features such as voice acting and a 2.5D graphic style from previous games throughout the Mega Man franchise. As of 2025, it is the best-selling game in the franchise, selling over two million copies worldwide. It received positive reviews from critics, with praise to its graphics, boss battles and mechanics, though it was criticized for its difficulty spikes and some aspects of the level design, including the length of its levels. A sequel, Mega Man: Dual Override, is set to be released in 2027.

== Gameplay ==
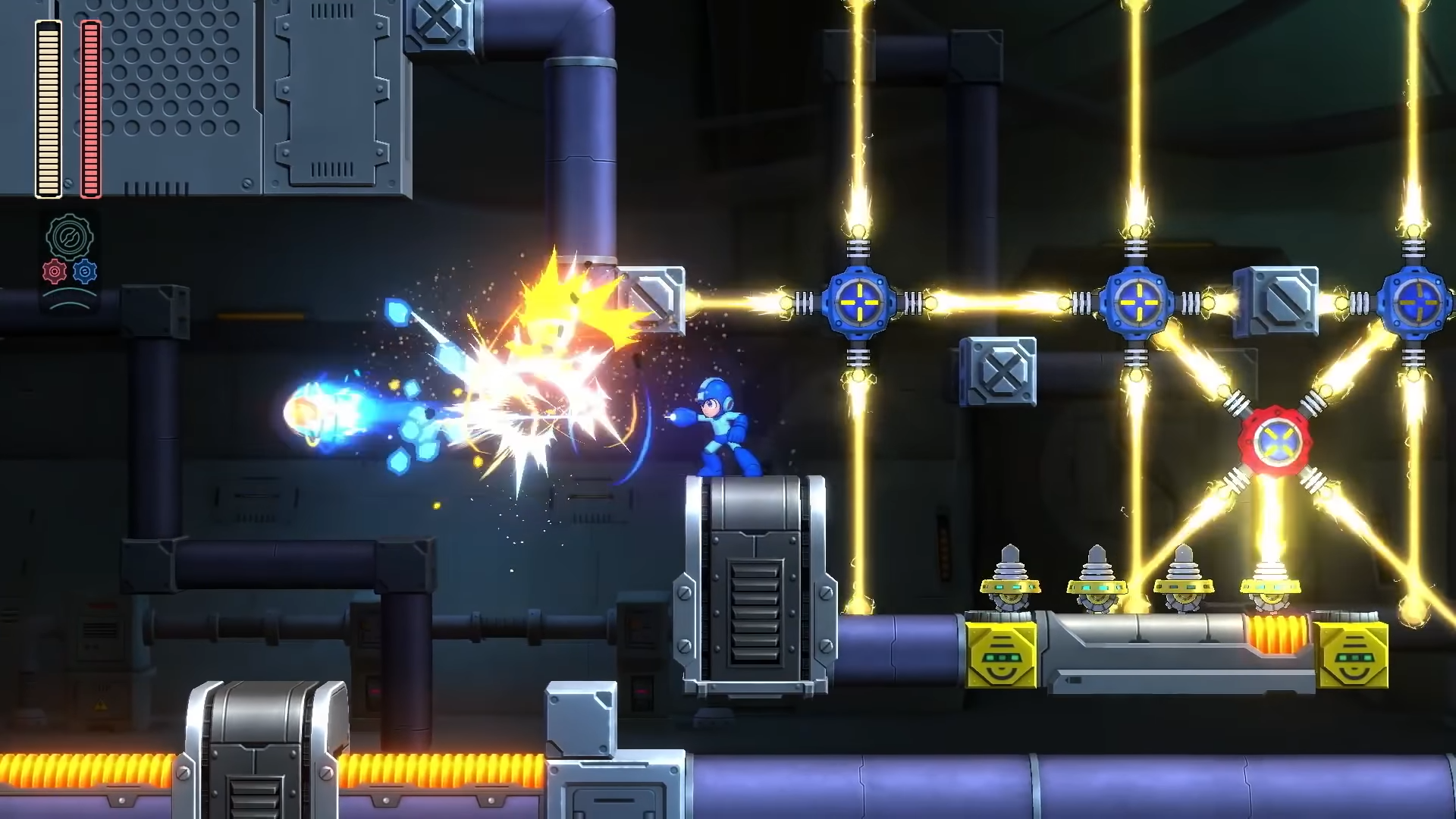
A gameplay screenshot of Mega Man 11. The head-up display displays Mega Man's energy level and Weapon Energy Level, which is used to fire Special Weapons.

Mega Man 11 retains the gameplay style of the classic Mega Man series of games, and features a 2.5D graphics style with 3D polygonal characters and 2D environments. Players control Mega Man in an attempt to stop Dr. Wily from using the Double Gear system that he invented many years before when he was at Robot University. Players travel through eight linear stages, which can be chosen in any way the player sees fit, and have to face Doctor Wily's newest Robot Masters, including Block Man, Fuse Man, Blast Man, Acid Man, Tundra Man, Torch Man, Impact Man (known as Pile Man in Japan), and Bounce Man (known as Rubber Man in Japan).

Mega Man can charge his Mega Buster and slide, two moves that he lost in Mega Man 9 and Mega Man 10, as well as obtain new weapons by defeating Robot Master bosses at the end of each level. Unique to this game is the Double Gear system, which grants Mega Man two additional abilities: the Speed Gear and Power Gear. The Speed Gear lets Mega Man slow down time, allowing him to dodge attacks more easily, while the Power Gear increases the attack power of Mega Man's weaponry, allowing him to fire two charged shots at the same time at the cost of reducing his standard fire rate to two solar bullets at a time instead of three, and while his special weapons get powered up, they will cost more ammo; however, there is a limit, showcased by a bar above Mega Man's head, so if he uses them too much, he will overheat, making him unable to reuse them again for a few seconds. If he fires a charge shot when the gauge is full, he will fire an ever large and stronger charge shot known as the Final Charge Shot. When Mega Man's health is critically low, he can use Double Gear to activate both gears at the same time. This can only be used once and leaves Mega Man weakened after the limit expires because of the severe strains: he can't charge his shots, can only fire a single solar bullet at a time and he will only have one unit of life energy, making the next hit he takes fatal for him, and even the cooldown period where he can't use the gears is longer.

The game has additional features including Time Trials, Missions, Global Leaderboards, a character gallery and more. The game also features difficulty settings, last seen in Mega Man 10, expanding upon them for a total of four: Newcomer, Casual, Normal, and Superhero. The Nintendo Switch version has Amiibo support, which can be used to unlock in-game items.

== Plot ==
The story begins with a flashback of Dr. Thomas Light and Dr. Albert Wily when they were students at Robot University at the exact moment their friendship fell apart. The committee is debating over choosing either Light's research of robots with independent thoughts or Wily's Double Gear system to continue work on. Despite Wily's objections to Light's ideologies, Light's research was chosen over Wily's. Enraged by his rejection, Wily swears revenge on Light. After the flashback ends with Wily waking up disturbed, he suddenly remembers the Double Gear System from his dream of the past and begins plotting.

Meanwhile, at his lab, Light, Roll, and Auto are checking up on eight of the latest generation models of Robot Masters for maintenance. Just as they finish with one, Wily barges into the lab and tells Light that he has perfected the Double Gear system before using its Speed Gear to capture the Robot Masters. Mega Man demands Wily release them, but he kidnaps the robots and takes them away with the intention to use them as test subjects for the Double Gear System and his new evil scheme. Dr. Light explains to Mega Man about the Double Gear System and its capabilities, warning him that he won't stand a chance with his power alone. Seeing Mega Man's determination, he reveals that he kept and repaired Wily's prototype Double Gear System. After briefly warning him of its risks, he reluctantly installs the Double Gear into Mega Man to help him combat Wily's forces, and a few days later, Mega Man is ready to fight.

After Mega Man defeats four Robot Masters, Dr. Light explains to him that back in their university days, the Double Gear System was partly responsible for their decisive disagreement alongside their different ideals, to the point that the dispute had to be solved by a committee. He believed that if robots were given the power to think for themselves, they could be true partners with humans, while Wily believed that even robots who think independently would be mere tools to humans, but by giving them power and speed boosts with the Double Gear System, then humans would finally respect robots for what they are and any robot could become a hero. However, Light objected to Wily's research because he was concerned about the side effects of the Double Gear System, as it would push the robots that have it equipped past their limits, the resulting severe strain on their systems would be too dangerous for them and that there would be terrible consequences if it ended up in the wrong hands. The committee chose Light's research over Wily's, and the latter, bitter and feeling that his old friend had been favoured over him yet again, broke his prototype, stormed off and never forgave him. Back in the present, Dr. Light sadly wonders if he had shown him there was a way to work together instead of just telling him that he was wrong, they might have remained friends. He then gives Mega Man the Rush Jet modification for Rush (Mega Man's robotic pet dog) with Mega Man then setting off to defeat the remaining Robot Masters.

After all eight Robot Masters are defeated, Auto attempts to locate Wily, who angrily challenges Mega Man to come to his Gear Fortress so he can deal with him. Mega Man overcomes Wily's defences and the Robot Masters once again, then defeats the doctor in his new Wily Machine. After begging for mercy with the Speed Gear, which Mega Man doesn't fall for, Wily insists that he did not lose to Mega Man but the Double Gear system. Light arrives and, after Wily accused him of plagiarism for using the same technology as him, tries to make amends with Wily, citing Mega Man as an example of their ideas working together, but Wily declares he will only be satisfied once he defeats Light and his creation and escapes, leaving Light dismayed and disappointed that their fracture will never be fixed. As the fortress begins to collapse, Auto arrives, telling Light he had finished doing what he asked of him. With that, the three of them escape the collapsing fortress.

Back at the lab, Light reveals he and Auto went to the Gear Fortress to find the parts in order to rebuild the Robot Masters. Auto uses Mega Man's Double Gear System to carry the Robot Masters to the repair room, so they can be sent back to their owners (during which he overheats and faints).

== Development ==
The game was announced in December 2017 as part of the celebration of the series' 30th anniversary, along with the announcements of re-releases of earlier Mega Man games. Mega Man 11 features 3D polygonal characters and hand-drawn environments, departing from the pixel art-based approach from previous games, and is displayed in 2.5D. It was directed by Koji Oda and produced by Kazuhiro Tsuchiya, with character designs by Yuji Ishihara, and music by Marika Suzuki. According to Tsuchiya and Oda, the departure of Mega Man producer Keiji Inafune was mainly the reason for the long hiatus of a new game, as there was a huge hesitation for anyone to step up and become "the new Mega Man guy" up until Oda himself did so. Marika Suzuki was the composer, although she was unresponsible for the arranged versions.

Mega Man 11 was released worldwide for Nintendo Switch, PlayStation 4, Windows, and Xbox One on October 2, 2018, except in Japan where it was released two days later. An alternate soundtrack in the form of a DLC add-on for the game was made freely available to those who pre-ordered the game. A Mega Man Amiibo was released alongside the game for the Switch version. A demo featuring Block Man's stage was released on the Nintendo Switch on September 6, 2018, and on the Xbox One and PlayStation 4 the following day. A version for Amazon Luna was made available on September 9, 2021.

== Reception ==
Reception

Aggregate scores
Aggregator	Score
Metacritic	(PS4) 82/100 (NS) 80/100 (XONE) 77/100 (PC) 79/100
OpenCritic	75% recommend

Review scores
Publication	Score
Destructoid	8.5/10
Electronic Gaming Monthly	9/10
Famitsu	8/10, 8/10, 9/10, 9/10
Game Informer	8.75/10
GameRevolution	4.5/5
GameSpot	7/10
IGN	7.5/10
Nintendo Life	9/10

Mega Man 11 received "generally favorable" reviews from critics, according to review aggregator website Metacritic.

IGN gave it a 7.5/10 rating, saying, "It's not revolutionary, but Mega Man 11 feels almost like a classic Mega Man game, and is a good foundation for the next 10 games" while GameSpot gave it a 7/10 rating praising the game for its "great sub-bosses and intense robot master fights[,] some new stage gimmicks [being] a lot of fun and endearing personality of the series com[ing] through in the visual and character design", while criticizing the stages for being "far too long and hav[ing] some questionable elements[,] the difficulty spikes throughout levels lead[ing] to frustrating setbacks [and] the Double Gear System never seem[ing] quite as useful as you want it to be". Nintendo Life gave it a 9/10 rating, writing that "Mega Man 11 is an excellent resurgence for the Blue Bomber, imbuing the tried-and-true classic gameplay with modern touches and new ideas that expand on existing concepts in interesting ways."

=== Sales ===
During its first week on sale in Japan, the physical Nintendo Switch version of Mega Man 11 sold 14,650 copies, while the physical PlayStation 4 version sold 12,052 copies. As of February 2019, the game sold 870,000 copies worldwide, As of September 2019, the game sold 1.3 million copies worldwide. Capcom confirmed in September 30, 2022 that it had sold over 1.6 million copies, becoming the highest selling game in the Mega Man franchise. As of September 2023, the game sold 1.8 million copies worldwide. As of February 2025, the game has sold 2 million copies worldwide, making it the best-selling entry in the franchise. As of 2026, the game has sold 2.3 million copies.

=== Accolades ===
The game was nominated for "Best Action Game" at The Game Awards 2018, for "Original Light Mix Score, Franchise" at the National Academy of Video Game Trade Reviewers Awards, and for the G.A.N.G. / MAGFEST People's Choice Award at the 2019 G.A.N.G. Awards.
