= Mega Man 8 =

1996 video game

- Japanese Sega Saturn cover art
- Developer: Capcom
- Publishers: JP/NA: Capcom; PAL: Infogrames
- Director: Hayato Kaji
- Producer: Keiji Inafune
- Artists: Hideki Ishikawa; Shinsuke Komaki
- Composer: Shusaku Uchiyama
- Series: Mega Man
- Platforms: PlayStation, Sega Saturn
- Release: PlayStation: JP: December 17, 1996; NA: March 1997; PAL: October 1997; Saturn: JP: January 17, 1997; NA: March 1997
- Genre: Platform
- Mode: Single-player

Mega Man 8 (Note: Also known as Rockman 8: Metal Heroes (Japanese: ロックマン8: メタルヒーローズ, Hepburn: Rokkuman 8: Metaru Hīrōzu) in Japan) is a 1996 platform game developed and published by Capcom. It was directed by Hayato Kaji and produced by Keiji Inafune, both of whom had previously worked on the series as artists. It is the eighth installment in the original Mega Man series, and was initially released in Japan on the PlayStation in 1996. The following year, Mega Man 8 saw a release on the Sega Saturn and was localized for both consoles in North America and the PlayStation alone in PAL regions. Mega Man 8 is the first game in the series made available on 32-bit consoles. The plot follows series protagonist Mega Man as he is called to investigate an energy reading coming from a recent meteor crash on an island. Mega Man discovers that his nemesis Dr. Wily has run off with the energy source, and sets off to stop Wily's evil plans to use the energy, and to discover the purpose of a mysterious alien robot found at the crash site.

Mega Man 8 has improved graphics and sound over previous iterations in the series, as well as new full-motion video and voice acting. Aside from a few minor conventions, the game has the same 2D side-scrolling and platform game formula established by its predecessors on the Nintendo Entertainment System and Super NES platforms. It received a moderately positive reception. Many reviewers appreciated the game's aesthetics and gameplay qualities when compared to its earlier counterparts, but several other critics were displeased by the lack of innovation in its gameplay and felt that it did not utilize the full potential of the 32-bit platforms. Additionally, the English-language version of the game received considerable criticism for the notoriously poor quality of the voice acting. The game was a moderate commercial success and was re-released on best-seller lines in Japan and North America.

Mega Man 8 was followed by Mega Man & Bass, a 1998 spin-off game for the Super Famicom which reused several of the game's assets and characters. A true sequel to the game, Mega Man 9, would not be released until 2008, and would revert to the graphical and gameplay style of the early NES games.

== Plot ==
Taking place in the 21st century (the ambiguous year 20XX) and after the events of Mega Man 7, two alien robots engage in a battle in the depths of space. Ultimately, both of them plummet towards Earth, critically injured. On Earth, humanoid robot Mega Man and his robot canine companion Rush are caught in a skirmish with his rival Bass, who still wants to prove himself to be stronger than Mega Man. Thanks to the timely intervention of his sister Roll, who was bringing a message from his creator Dr. Light, Mega Man manages to subdue Bass long enough to leave. Bass swears that he will get back at Mega Man for his "cowardice". Dr. Light asks Mega Man to investigate strange energy readings on a nearby island. On the island, Mega Man finds Dr. Wily flying away with a strange purple orb. Before chasing him, he sees a damaged robot and asks for Dr. Light to pick it up and try to repair it. Dr. Wily then releases four new advanced and modern Robot Masters to combat Mega Man: Frost Man, Tengu Man, Clown Man, and Grenade Man. Each time he destroys one, he receives a purple orb like the one Dr. Wily captured. Each of the Robot Masters are empowered with a strange energy, and it seems that this power comes from the new energy cores that Wily has infused them with.

After Mega Man defeats the four Robot Masters, he returns to the lab and brings Dr. Light the energy cores he retrieved; Dr. Light examines them and realizes that they are a powerful form of energy, which Dr. Wily must not have in his possession. After they leave the lab, the robot awakens and sees the energy cores, becoming enraged and flies off into the distance. Mega Man follows him to a mine shaft on the other side of the globe. After battling the robot, Proto Man shows up and tells Mega Man that Dr. Wily's new fortress, "Wily Tower," is just ahead. Mega Man goes there but is captured by one of Wily's giant robotic creations. The robot saves him and introduces himself as Duo. Duo explains to Mega Man that the purple orbs are "Evil Energy" and he has been traveling the universe, tracking down this energy and trying to destroy it before it engulfs the entire world. However, Wily Tower has a barrier around it that prevents him from taking out the source. Duo tells Mega Man to destroy the four other Robot Masters that hold the key to the barrier (Astro Man, Sword Man, Search Man, and Aqua Man), while he collects and extinguishes the rest of the world's Evil Energy.

Once the remaining Robot Masters are defeated, Wily Tower's barrier is lifted and Mega Man makes his way through it, defeating the hordes of robotic henchmen inside, including Bass, who uses a piece of the Evil Energy to amplify his powers, and ultimately, the evil doctor himself. The "Evil Energy" is destroyed before it is allowed to spread throughout the world, but it manages to infect Mega Man before being destroyed, and Wily's newest compound is demolished with Mega Man inside, who is dying from the Evil Energy. Duo arrives, and seeing the goodness and justice in his heart, cures him of the evil energy, eradicating the last remnants of the Evil Energy on Earth. Proto Man catches up to him; Duo then says that his mission is done, and leaves, but not before asking Proto Man for a favor. Mega Man then wakes up in Dr. Light's Lab and is reunited with Light, Roll and the others who tell him that Duo saved him. He then walks outside and finds Proto Man, who gives him a message from Duo: "Thank You."

== Gameplay ==
Mega Man 8 retains much of the same gameplay featured in previous titles of the series. Shown in the image is Clown Man's stage.

The gameplay of Mega Man 8 is similar to that of its predecessors. The player, as Mega Man, must complete various stages that contain side-scrolling action and platforming elements. The player can run, jump, slide, shoot, swim, charge the Mega Buster, and change weapons. Enemies can be destroyed to reveal items used to refill Mega Man's health and weapon power. Like Mega Man 7, the player first completes an introductory stage and is then presented with four Robot Master stages (Tengu Man, Frost Man, Grenade Man, and Clown Man) to tackle in any order. At the end of each stage is a boss battle with a Robot Master; defeating the Robot Master earns the player its Master Weapon. Most Robot Masters are weak to either the Mega Buster or one or more Master Weapon, allowing for some strategy in the order the stages are completed. An additional four Robot Masters (Aqua Man, Sword Man, Search Man, and Astro Man) become available once the first four are defeated and an intermission stage is completed.

An addition to gameplay in Mega Man 8 is the ability to display and use multiple weapons onscreen simultaneously. This change introduces a unique way of using weapons strategically. For example, Mega Man can place a Tornado Hold, jump into it and swing the Flame Sword while rising with the air current. The player also has the ability to use the Mega Buster at all times, even when equipped with a Master Weapon. The player can buy new abilities from Roll in Dr. Light's lab in exchange for special bolts found throughout the levels. However, due to a limited number of bolts and powerup slots available, the player must carefully decide which power-ups to buy. Power-ups utilizing Mega Man's dog Rush are won by fighting mid-stage minibosses. Such Rush items include Rush Question, giving the player a random pickup, Rush Charger, which makes pickups rain from the skies, and Rush Bike, used to cross large gaps.

== Development and release ==
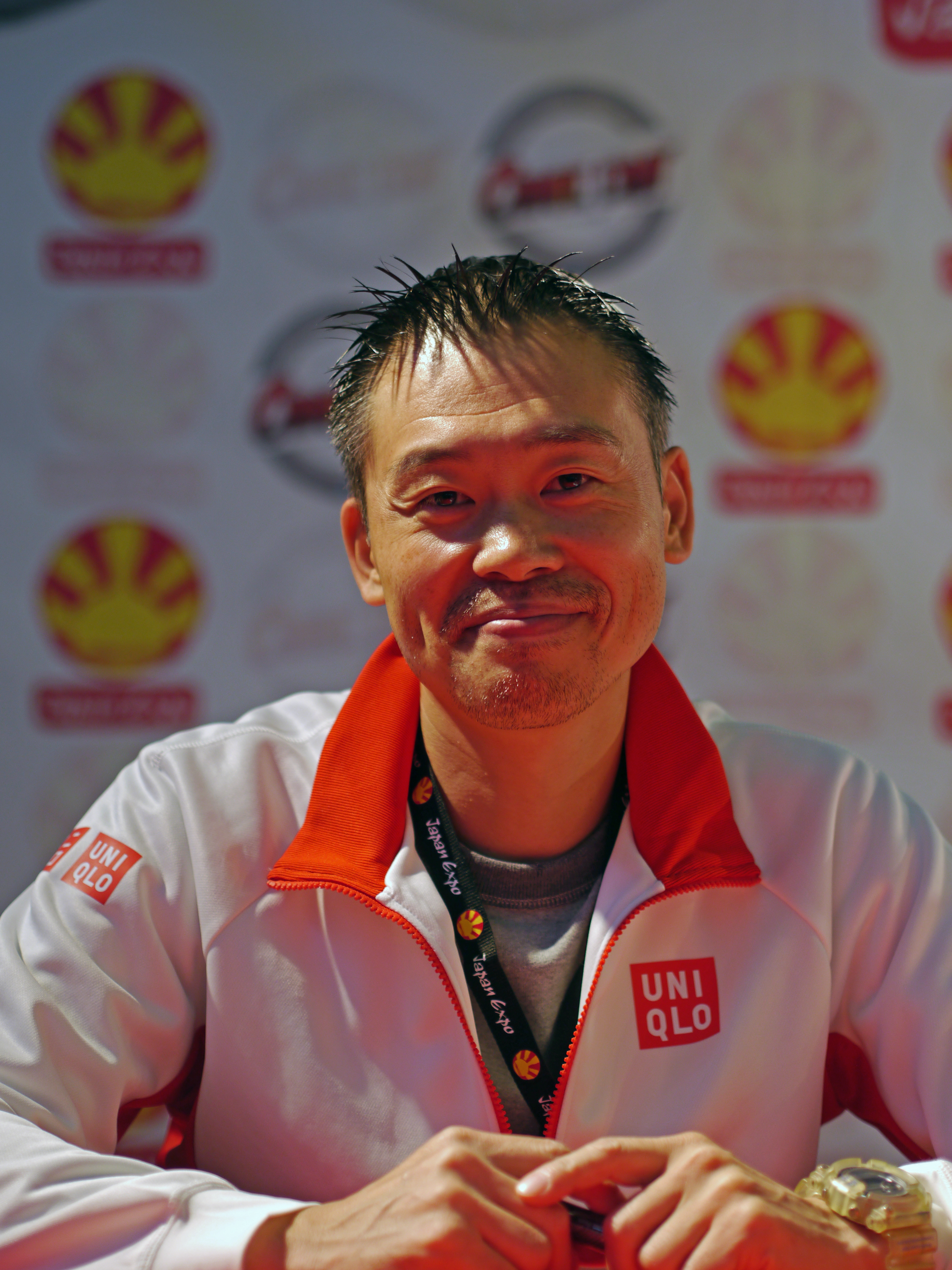
Keiji Inafune was the producer for Mega Man 8.

Tokuro Fujiwara, who had been the producer for previous Mega Man titles, had left Capcom, so Keiji Inafune, who had previously played the role of artist for many titles in the series, became a producer for Mega Man 8. He handed off many of the main responsibilities to Hayato Kaji, an artist he often considered to be his student. Inafune recounted, "This allowed me to take a very different approach to creating a Mega Man game. 'Seeing Mega Man from a distance,' I guess you could say." Illustrators including Hideki Ishikawa and Shinsuke Komaki worked under the two veterans. Inafune recounted that the development team was often overwhelmed during the game's development because it involved some unfamiliar elements such as coordinating releases on two new systems and the use of anime cutscenes. The team enlisted the help of animation studio Xebec to produce the animated cutscenes for the game. Inafune had wanted to include animated cutscenes since the very first game in the series, and stated that he was pleased with the outcome.

The character Duo was created specifically for Mega Man 8, but was first made a playable character in the earlier 1996 arcade fighting game Mega Man 2: The Power Fighters. Kaji initially designed Duo as a robot invented by the Mega Man 4 character Dr. Cossack. When it was decided that Duo would instead come from outer space, his appearance changed but still retained remnants of Russian traits, such as his ushanka. Like past games in the series, the Robot Masters were picked from design contests in Japan. Capcom received around 110,000 idea submissions. For the contest, Capcom prepared drawings showing basic shapes for entrants to base their designs on, such as a bipedal top-heavy base with two heads; three of the final designs (Sword Man, Clown Man, and Search Man) were based on these. Ishikawa recounted, "The submissions we'd get for the boss characters were absolutely brimming with the youthful imagination of kids. I still remember how everyone had permanent smiles painted on their faces as we looked at each and every one of the submissions that came through." Tengu Man and Astro Man had already been designed by Capcom prior to the contest.

The musical score for Mega Man 8 was composed by Shusaku Uchiyama. It was the first project at Capcom that Uchiyama led himself. The Japanese version of the game features the J-pop vocal opening theme "Electrical Communication" and the ending theme "Brand New Way" by the group Ganasia.

The two versions of the game are not identical. The Saturn version has two added bosses from previous Mega Man games and a bonus mode with official and fan artwork, voice and music tests, and a secret animation test for the cutscenes. Music tracks slightly differ in arrangement between the versions, with two remixes being added for the extra bosses and the music for Tengu Man's stage being completely different.

Mega Man 8 was released in Japan on the PlayStation on December 17, 1996, and the Sega Saturn on January 17, 1997. It was published in North America on both the PlayStation and Saturn in March 1997. The PlayStation version was initially not going to be released in North America, as it was a 2D game at a time when Sony was pushing for games with 3D graphics. Upon learning the game would be released on a PlayStation competitor, Sony changed its mind, approving the game's release in North American on the condition it have content the Saturn version lacked. This resulted in the first editions, branded as the Anniversary Collector's Edition, being enclosed with a 12-page full-color anthology booklet commemorating Mega Man's tenth anniversary. In Europe, the game was to be published by Laguna Video Games, a German game publisher who released a majority of Capcom's SNES games in Europe, before Laguna's owner, Philips Multimedia BV, was acquired by Infogrames in July 1997. The game was released in October 1997 exclusively for the PlayStation.

In Japan, numerous pieces of tie-in merchandise were released alongside the game, including action figures, gashapon toys, stationery, vinyl records, and furniture. A 43-track disc containing the instrumental music was released by Team Entertainment later in 2007.

== Reception ==
Initial sales of Mega Man 8 were good. Major gaming retailers in North America including Electronics Boutique and Babbage's reported selling 55% of their stock within three days of the game's release. Electronics Boutique additionally noted having sold 75% of its stock within ten days, and many locations of Babbage's being sold out in similar period of time. Capcom's president Bill Gardner later announced that the response they got from retailers was so overwhelming they had to allocate product based on orders being greater than anticipated.

Reception

Aggregate score
Aggregator	Score
GameRankings	SAT: 76.25% PS: 70.75%

Review scores
Publication	Score
AllGame	SAT: 4/5
Computer and Video Games	PS: 3/5
Electronic Gaming Monthly	SAT: 8.5/10, 8.5/10, 8.5/10, 8.5/10
Famitsu	PS: 6/10, 5/10, 7/10, 7/10; SAT: 8/10, 6/10, 7/10, 6/10
Game Informer	PS: 7/10
GameFan	PS: 86/100
GamePro	PS: 16/20
GameRevolution	SAT: B
GameSpot	PS: 6.3/10; SAT: 6.0/10
IGN	PS: 6/10
Next Generation	PS: 2/5
PlayStation: The Official Magazine	PS: 4/5
Dengeki PlayStation	85/100, 60/100
Ultra Game Players	PS: 8.1/10

Mega Man 8 received moderately positive reviews from critics. One complaint involved the game having virtually nothing in terms of gameplay or features that had not already appeared in previous installments of the series, and very little change in the gameplay formula that had been used since the first Mega Man game appeared a decade ago. Jeff Gerstmann of GameSpot commented that the robots seem to be clones of enemies from earlier, while Matt Rubenstein summarized his reviews, "this whole premise has been done seven times before and [...] it's starting to get old." In contrast, Crispin Boyer of Electronic Gaming Monthly, while agreeing it did not add anything new, still gave praise for its controls and bosses. Some claimed that the game's graphics did not utilize the abilities of fifth generation consoles outside of the FMV cutscenes. The English-dubbing voice acting in Mega Man 8 was considered some of the worst in video games by publications including EGM, IGN, and the Australian television show Good Game.

In 2010, IGN's Lucas M. Thomas took a similar look back on the franchise, calling Mega Man 8 the worst in the core Mega Man series because it took Capcom's iconic hero off of Nintendo consoles, utilized animated cutscenes with bad voice acting, and further changed the visual style. GamesRadar named Mega Man 8 the 23rd best Sega Saturn game of all time out of a list of 25.

== Legacy ==
In 1998, Capcom released Mega Man & Bass on the Super Famicom with many of the same sprites, animations, and backgrounds as taken from Mega Man 8. Ten years later, Capcom announced another follow-up, Mega Man 9, which changed the graphical style of the series back to its 8-bit appearance similar to the first six installments. Capcom did not replicate any of the gameplay mechanics included in the eighth installment for this sequel, save for the shop and bolt currency system.

In 2002, the PlayStation version of Mega Man 8 was re-released as part of Sony's Greatest Hits label of bestsellers, confirming that it had sold at least 350,000 units. In Japan, the game received budget re-releases as part of both the PlayStation the Best for Family and the Sega Saturn Collection. The PlayStation version was ported to the North American Mega Man Anniversary Collection for the PlayStation 2 and GameCube in 2004 and the Xbox in 2005. The PlayStation version was later ported again and released as part of Mega Man Legacy Collection 2 on PlayStation 4, Windows, and Xbox One in August 2017, with a later digital version released on the Nintendo Switch in May 2018.
