= List of Mega Man characters =

This is a list of characters in the Mega Man series.

== Concept and creation ==
According to artist and producer Keiji Inafune, Dr Wily's name and design are inspired by Albert Einstein, and he was initially conceived to appear as a tall, thin scientist with a mustache, glasses, balding hair, and lab coat. As development on Mega Man progressed, Inafune redrew Wily to match the in-game sprites, making him shorter and removing the glasses from his design. Inafune has expressed disdain for this design, stating in a 2003 interview that if an artist approached him with similar work, he would reject it and demand better. With the production of Mega Man 2, Inafune decided to redraw Wily's design completely, aiming to tie into the common perception of a mad scientist. After making his design slightly taller and with elongated hair and chin, Inafune was satisfied with the alternations and kept the design consistent for later appearances of the character. Since the beginning of the Mega Man X series, Inafune wanted to add Dr. Wily to the story, leading to Mega Man X4 revealing that he created Zero to set the climax of the series. Wily often is shown moving his eyebrows up and down when he appears in most of the games, usually seen in the prologue cutscenes to the castle levels.

For Proto Man, Inafune wanted people to be unsure whether Proto Man was a friend or a foe. Several anime characters Inafune used to watch inspired Proto Man, with the glow from his eyes being inspired by Break Man. The design also involved his shield being a "cool factor" and a sign of his superiority over Mega Man. Higurashi considers Proto Man and Rush to be the main attractions of Mega Man 3, while Hideki considers Mega Man 5 as a "Blue"'s Trap, resulting in major focus when making illustrations focusing on him. For Mega Man 8, Kaji had difficulties in making the illustrations, leading Inafune to revise the ones from Proto Man.

Since the release of Mega Man, numerous characters have appeared across the series.

== Classic Mega Man characters ==
=== Main characters ===
==== Mega Man ====
DLN-001 Mega Man, known in Japan as Rockman (ロックマン, Rokkuman) is the main protagonist of the original Mega Man series. Dr. Light originally created him to be a lab assistant named Rock, but he was modified for combat after Dr. Wily reprogrammed the original Robot Masters to take over the world. His Variable Weapons System allows him to copy the weapons of other Robot Masters and use them as his own.

==== Dr. Light ====
Voiced by (English): Antony Holland (Captain N: The Game Master), Jim Byrnes (90s TV series), Randall Wiebe (Mega Man X8, Mega Man Maverick Hunter X and Mega Man Powered Up), Michael Mislove (Marvel vs. Capcom: Infinite), Doug Stone (Mega Man 11), Garry Chalk (Mega Man: Fully Charged), Rick Overton (Secret Level).
Voiced by (Japanese): Tomohisa Aso (Mega Man Maverick Hunter X and Mega Man Powered Up), Nobuo Tobita (Mega Man 11)

Doctor Thomas Light, known in Japan as Doctor Thomas Right (トーマス・ライト, Tōmasu Raito), is a scientist and roboticist and the creator of Mega Man and several other robots, such as his Robot Masters, and he considers them his own children; as such, he can be considered the father of Mega Man, Roll, and Proto Man. Dr. Light is an idealist with a big heart, but he's naive and gullible at times, especially when it's about his rival, Dr. Wily. Despite being a pacifist and disliking violence, he reluctantly recognizes that using force can sometimes be necessary. He plays a supporting role throughout the series, often developing new equipment to help Mega Man in his battles. He died prior to the events of the Mega Man X series, which is set 100 years after the original series, but his legacy continues through his last creation, X, and he maintains a supporting role through enhancement capsules that contain upgrades to X's systems along with messages relayed by holographic projections of him. He also appears in the "Navi Mode" of Mega Man and Mega Man 6 in the Mega Man Anniversary Collection to provide gameplay hints to Mega Man.

==== Dr. Wily ====
Voiced by (English): Ian James Corlett (Captain N: The Game Master), Scott McNeil (90s TV series), Dean Galloway (Mega Man Powered Up), Keith Silverstein (Mega Man 11)

Doctor Albert W. Wily (Dr.ワイリー, Dokutā Wairī) is a mad scientist and the main antagonist of the series. He was Dr. Light's colleague when they were university students; driven by jealousy towards Light and his achievements overshadowing his own, he reprogrammed Light's robots, except for Rock and Roll, to assist him in taking over the world. However, Rock, who was upgraded and became known as Mega Man, defeated him. Wily returns as antagonist in subsequent titles of the main series, each time with a different scheme, only to ultimately be defeated and surrender to Mega Man.

Wily has also played a major role in the backgrounds of other characters in the series. He repaired the prototype for Mega Man, Proto Man, and in Mega Man 7 used the knowledge he gained from the process to create his answer to Light's work, Bass. After Bass proved to be unreliable, Wily refined his design, creating Zero, who, in the Mega Man X and Mega Man Zero games, is a hero working alongside Light's last creation, X. Though Wily died prior to the events of the Mega Man X series, his legacy continues through a virus which Zero initially carries and is later transferred to Sigma, resulting in the creation of the Sigma Virus and most of the Mavericks.

GamesRadar praised that "Dr. Wily brings a certain flair to his evil schemes". IGN praised Dr. Wily as a "hopelessly persistent" video game villain, who returned despite his failure at the ending of each Mega Man game, concluding that "in a realm dominated by forgettable villains, Dr. Wily's staying power is a true testament to both his fictional tenacity and his popularity amongst gamers since the 8-bit days of the 1980s." Destructoid editor Chris Carter attributed the appeal of the character in part to the recurring grovelling of Dr. Wily after each defeat, allowing the player to "revel in your enemy's defeat", and considered this trait "as iconic as it is an in-joke".

==== Proto Man ====
DLN-000 Proto Man, known in Japan as Blues (ブルース, Burūsu), was the prototype of the robot master, and Mega Man's older teenage brother. He first appeared in Mega Man 3 under the name Break Man working for Wily (albeit disloyally). However, at the end of Mega Man 2: The Power Fighters, Dr. Light reveals that Proto Man's energy system has a fatal defect, causing him great pain and shortening his lifespan. He also appears in the "Navi Mode" of Mega Man 3 in the Mega Man Anniversary Collection to provide gameplay hints to Mega Man.

The absence of Proto Man in Mega Man 11 has been criticized. Mega Man 11 producer Kazuhiro Tsuchiya explained his exclusion in the game, stating that "What we struggled with the most was how to develop a clear and engaging story that builds upon the previous installments while appealing to a wide range of players; new players picking up a Mega Man game for the first time, those who may have forgotten the series' backstory, and the hardcore fans who remember the events of 9 and 10 as though they happened yesterday. After the long gap between 10 and 11, we decided to focus on sharing an untold story that touches on the past of Dr. Light and Dr. Wily."

==== Bass ====
Voiced by (Japanese): Keiko Nemoto (X DiVE)

SWN-001 Bass, known in Japan as Forte (フォルテ, Forute), is a robot Dr. Wily designed, who was constructed based on research conducted on Mega Man with the intention of matching his power, being a more advanced model of Robot Master compared to Mega Man. He is powered by the energy Bassnium, the most powerful form of energy on Earth, which Wily discovered by mistake. He seeks to defeat Mega Man and be acknowledged as the world's strongest robot, and as such frequently rebels against Wily when he feels he is standing in the way of his goals. Despite this, Bass has worked with Mega Man several times, though usually for his own purposes.

Bass wields the Bass Buster, which originally functioned similarly to the Mega Buster, albeit with slightly different shots. As of Mega Man & Bass, however, it has lost its ability to charge shots in favor of an increased rate of fire and the ability to fire upwards and diagonally. Unlike the Mega Buster, its bullets do not travel through solid surfaces without equpping a specific upgrade. Like Mega Man and Proto Man, Bass can also copy the weapons of Robot Masters, with his body changing colors to reflect the weapon currently equipped. He can also combine with his robotic wolf Treble (ゴスペル, Gosuperu; Gospel) for the Treble Boost, allowing him to fly and shoot more powerful projectiles from the Buster.

He is playable in Mega Man 10, being added through DLC, where he retains his dash and rapid-fire, multi-directional arm cannon. In the game's re-release as part of Mega Man Legacy Collection 2, Bass is instead unlocked by either completing the game or by using a secret code at the title screen.

In Mega Man 2: The Power Fighters, where Zero makes a cameo appearance, Bass seeks to destroy him to prove that he is stronger than all other robots, as Wily says that he is a creation that could surpass him.

==== Roll ====
Voiced by (English): Robyn Ross (90s TV series), Angie Beers (Mega Man Powered Up), Erica Lindbeck (Mega Man 11)

DLN-002 Roll (ロール, DRN-002 Rōru) is Mega Man's younger "sister"; a female robot designed for housekeeping instead of fighting. She plays a supporting role in the first game and a more substantive role in subsequent sequels. Her name was never mentioned until Mega Man 3, which marks her return, where her entry in Dr. Light's robot list is shown during the ending. She also appears in the "Navi Mode" of Mega Man 2 in the Mega Man Anniversary Collection to provide gameplay hints to Mega Man.

She is usually depicted with blonde hair worn in a ponytail and wearing a red dress and mary janes. In Mega Man 8, she wears a black and red dress with red boots and a green ribbon in her hair. Despite not being designed for fighting, she appears as a combatant in the fighting games Marvel vs. Capcom, Marvel vs. Capcom 2, and Tatsunoko vs. Capcom, as well as in Mega Man Powered Up. Alternate versions of Roll appear in two other Mega Man spinoff series: Roll Caskett in Mega Man Legends, and Roll.EXE in Mega Man Battle Network. Roll also appears in other Mega Man media, including manga and the Mega Man TV series.

==== Rush ====
Rush (ラッシュ, Rasshu) is Mega Man's robotic dog and sidekick. He was created by Dr. Light to be an all-around support unit and is first introduced in Mega Man 3. He can transform into various forms, including Rush Marine, which transforms him into a one-seated submarine, and Rush Jet, which transforms his legs into jet engines that allow him to fly. He also has the Rush Coil, a spring that pops out of his back and helps Mega Man reach higher platforms that he normally cannot access. Other games have him transform into a motorcycle and a drill car, and in the fourth and fifth Game Boy games as a spaceship. In later games, the Rush Adaptor allows Rush to attach himself to Mega Man and merge with him by using specific adaptors, allowing him to float, shoot more powerful blasts, and launch his arms as projectiles. In some games, such as Mega Man 7 and Mega Man 8, Rush can be used to obtain items, such as health. His name is derived from another Capcom game, The Speed Rumbler, which is known as Rush & Crash in Japan, while the pronunciation of his name is similar to Lassie.

=== Supporting characters ===
==== Auto ====
Auto, known as Rightot in Japan, is a robot that Dr. Light created to replace Rock's role as lab assistant due to him being unable to fulfill that role after becoming Mega Man. He is introduced in Mega Man 7, where he provides Mega Man with upgrades and parts. In Mega Man 8, Auto assists Mega Man in the Rush Jet scenes, using a rocket launcher and a propeller in his head that allows him to fly. He also appears in Mega Man & Bass, creating upgrades for the player in exchange for 'bolts' dropped by defeated enemies. He returns again in Mega Man 11 as Dr. Light's lab assistant, helping Mega Man by creating new parts for him from bolts collected from enemies. He, or a robot resembling him, makes a cameo appearance in CD versions of Mega Man X3, watching TV in the background of the FMV intro for Volt Catfish's stage, making him the only robot from the classic series to also appear in the X series.

==== Beat ====
Beat is a robotic bird that Dr. Cossack created to provide additional support to Mega Man during the events of Mega Man 5 and has since appeared in many Mega Man games. Several of the games require the player to obtain a certain number of Beat Plates in order to use him. Beat homes in on enemies, providing damage by charging them; however, in Mega Man 6, he does not attack bosses. In Mega Man 7, Mega Man 9, Mega Man 10 and Mega Man 11, he rescues Mega Man, as well as Proto Man in Mega Man 10, from pits. In Mega Man 8, he can assist Mega Man during the Rush Jet sections by dealing damage on contact and dashing in a straight line when he fires a charge shot, and also provides him with an energy barrier in Mega Man & Bass that makes him temporarily invincible to damage except from instant-death hazards. He assists Duo and Proto Man as a temporary invincibility power-up in Power Fighters.

==== Dr. Cossack ====
Dr. Mikhail Sergeyevich Cossack is a Russian colleague of Dr. Light, who appears in Mega Man 4 as the main antagonist. However, it is later revealed that he was being blackmailed, as Wily kidnapped his daughter Kalinka. After Proto Man rescues Kalinka and the truth is revealed, Dr. Cossack stops working for Wily and becomes an ally to Mega Man. In Mega Man 5, he helps him in his quest to save Dr. Light, powering up his Mega Buster into the Super Mega Buster, improving its charge shot. He's the inventor of several industrial and military robots such as Tundra Man from Mega Man 11, and he also created Beat, a robotic bird that he gave to Mega Man as a gift to thank him for stopping Dr. Wily when he had kidnapped his daughter. He also appears in the "Navi Mode" of Mega Man 5 in the Mega Man Anniversary Collection to provide gameplay hints to Mega Man.

==== Duo ====
Duo is a robot from outer space who was designed to preserve the universe's peace and justice. Duo was formally introduced in Mega Man 8, where he is battling a robot powered by Evil Energy. After crashing to Earth, Dr. Light repairs him and he becomes an ally of Mega Man. After eradicating the Evil Energy on Earth and saving Mega Man's life when he gets infected by leftover Evil Energy, he thanks him and departs Earth to continue his mission in other parts of the universe. He later appears in Mega Man 2: The Power Fighters, which was released before Mega Man 8 but set six months after its events, as well as Mega Man Battle & Chase and Rockman Strategy.

==== Eddie ====
Eddie, originally known as Flip Top in early Western manuals, is a robot that Dr. Light created as a "walking suitcase", who first appeared in Mega Man 4. He is usually sent to help Mega Man by providing recovery items, and can also fire bombs from his head while assisting Mega Man in the Rush Jet sections of Mega Man 8. Starting with Mega Man 7, Eddie only appears in the shop and no longer gives items to Mega Man.

==== Kalinka ====
Kalinka Cossack is Dr. Cossack's daughter, who Proto Man kidnapped on Dr. Wily's orders to force her father into unwillingly declaring war against Mega Man on Wily's behalf. However, Proto Man later rescues her before Mega Man confronts and defeats Cossack in his citadel. Kalinka also appears in the "Navi Mode" of Mega Man 4 in the Mega Man Anniversary Collection to provide gameplay hints to Mega Man. She is named after the Russian folk song Kalinka.

==== King ====
King is a robot who appears in Mega Man and Bass as the apparent main antagonist. Declaring himself the king of all robots, he seeks to eradicate humanity and establish a world populated only by robots. After either Mega Man or Bass defeat him, it is revealed that Dr. Wily had programmed him to form a rebellion. While King seemingly dies after this revelation, during Mega Man's ending it is revealed that he survived and is now a wanderer, like Proto Man. He then apologizes for his actions and wishes to meet up with Mega Man peacefully.

King wields several weapons, including a battle-axe and a shield which can absorb attacks and fire them back as a laser beam. He also has the ability to merge with other vehicles to form King Jet Robo and King Tank Robo, the penultimate bosses of the game.

==== Tango ====
Tango (タンゴ) is a green robotic cat and one of Mega Man's allies. Tango can roll himself into a buzzsaw and dive into enemies until all in-area enemies are defeated, he falls into a pit or spikes, or his energy is expended. He debut in Mega Man V. He appeared in Rockman & Forte Mirai kara no Chōsensha, and as a cameo in Mega Man 10 in the item shop when playing as Proto Man. His name is derived from the music genre tango.

==== Reggae ====
Reggae is a robotic bird and Dr. Wily's pet, who appears in a Japan-exclusive drama CD, Wily & Right no RockBoard: That's Paradise, and in Rockman & Forte: Challenger From the Future as a weapon for Bass. His first appearance outside Japan is in Mega Man 7, where he appears if an invalid password is entered. He also appears in Mega Man 10 as shopkeeper when playing as Bass. In Archie Comics' adaptation of Mega Man, he has a more prominent role, usually mocking Dr. Wily's failures in the "Short Circuits" section. His name is derived from the music genre reggae.

==== Treble ====
Treble (ゴスペル, Gosuperu; Gospel) is Bass' equivalent to Rush, who, like Rush, can assume a jet-like form and fly in the form of an armored suit called the Treble Boost, which was created after Bass stole designs for the Super Adapter in Mega Man 7 and gives Bass limited flight capability and increased firepower. It also appears in Mega Man & Bass, where it also grants Bass invulnerability while its energy lasts, and in Mega Man 10, where it functions similarly to its previous incarnation, but without invulnerability. Its Japanese name of Gospel is likely derived from the musical genre gospel.

==== Met ====
The Met, also known as Hard Hat, is a construction robot wearing a hard hat with a plus sign on it. Mets usually wait below their helmet before attacking, as it is impervious to most of Mega Man's weapons. They appear in the various series with many different variations and forms, such as the Metall, Mettool, and Mettaur variants, but their look has largely remained the same. In the original Mega Man, another common enemy, the Picket Man, has a head similar to the Met, but with a full body, a shield, and a pickaxe. The Mets also appear in Super Smash Bros. for Nintendo 3DS and Wii U as a collectable trophy in both versions, as well as enemies in the 3DS-exclusive Smash Run mode.

==== Sniper Joe ====
Sniper Joe is a humanoid robot which Dr. Light built and which Dr. Wily later modified for infantry. They were built based on Proto Man and mass-produced for combat. Sniper Joes are a recurring enemy throughout the classic series, and most variants often operate machines such as walkers, gun turrets, jet skis, and helicopters. They wear a black visor and have a single red eye.

==== Yellow Devil ====
The Yellow Devil is a powerful combat robot which Dr. Wily created, and appears as the first fortress boss in the first game. Its body is made from a shape-memory alloy, allowing it to split into multiple pieces and reform elsewhere. At the center of its body is a single mechanical eye, which keeps the body together and is its sole weakness. The Yellow Devil is a recurring boss character throughout the series, with several successors and offshoots appearing in other games, such as the Yellow Devil MK-II in Mega Man 3, the Green Devil in Mega Man 8, and the Block Devil in Mega Man 10. Variants also appear in other series, including the Shadow Devil in Mega Man X5 and the Rainbow Devil in Mega Man Zero. The original Yellow Devil appears as a stage hazard on the Wily Castle stage in Super Smash Bros. for Nintendo 3DS and Wii U and Super Smash Bros. Ultimate. It appears periodically through battles on the stage, attacking in the same manner as the original Mega Man. It is able to be defeated, producing a large explosion that harms all players except the one who defeated it.

Early Western media referred to the Yellow Devil as the "Rock Monster", a change made due to Nintendo's policies regarding religious figures and names. However, the "Devil" name has since been used in recent American releases. The Mega Man/Sonic the Hedgehog crossover produced by Archie Comics featured the Chaos Devil, a being combining the Yellow Devil with Chaos.

==== Mega Man Killers ====
The Mega Man Killers are a series of robots appearing in the Game Boy series, which Dr. Wily created to destroy Mega Man. They reappear as bosses in the Game Boy version of Mega Man V, as well as bosses in the DLC stages of Mega Man 10. They are named after notable music genres.

Series Number	Japanese Name	Short Description	Weapon
RKN-001 Enker	Enker (エンカー Enkā)	The Mega Man Killer of Mega Man: Dr. Wily's Revenge. He wields a spiked bo staff, but his main attack is his Mirror Buster, which allows him to absorb Mega Man's buster shots and fire them back through his staff, with the size dependent on the number of shots absorbed, but also damages himself. He also appears in Wily & Right no RockBoard: That's Paradise, as the first fortress boss in Mega Man Soccer, and as the boss of the first DLC special stage in Mega Man 10. His name is derived from the Japanese musical genre Enka.	Mirror Buster M. Buster
RKN-002 Punk	Punk (パンク Panku)	The Mega Man Killer of Mega Man III. He wields the Screw Crusher, which flings rolling blades, and can also hurl himself after transforming to strike with his embedded blades. He is also the only Mega Man Killer to have a Battle Network counterpart, appearing in Mega Man Battle Network 3 as Mr. Famous' NetNavi. Keiji Inafune especially liked Punk, using his influence as a producer to have him included in the game and insisting on redesigning him personally. He reappears as the boss of the second DLC special stage in Mega Man 10. His name is derived from the musical genre punk rock.	Screw Crusher S. Crusher
RKN-003 Ballade	Ballade (バラード Barādo)	The Mega Man Killer of Mega Man IV. He wields the Ballade Cracker, which can lay timed mines and fire small explosives from the tops of his arms. After being defeated, he seems to turn against Dr. Wily and self-destructs to destroy a wall obstructing Mega Man, allowing him to escape from Wily's space fortress and return to Earth. He also appears in Mega Man 10 as the boss of the third DLC special stage. His name is derived from ballad.	Ballade Cracker B. Cracker
???-??? Quint	Quint (クイント Kuinto)	Despite not being a Mega Man Killer, Quint serves a similar role in Mega Man II and appears in Mega Man V alongside the Mega Man Killers. He is a future version of Mega Man which a time-travelling Dr. Wily abducted and remodeled. He wields the Sakugarne, a hybrid of a jackhammer and a pogo stick which he can attack with by digging into the ground and creating flying debris. His name is derived from quintet.	Sakugarne S.

==== Genesis Units ====
Series Number	Japanese Name	Short Description
WWN-01 Buster Rod G	バスターロッドG Basutā Roddo G	The leader of the Genesis Units and a master of martial arts. He is based on Sun Wukong from the Chinese novel Journey to the West. Journey to the West Due to his rowdy personality and inexperience, he often fights with Mega Water S, while Hyper Storm H tries to avoid the conflicts. The G in his name stands for "Son Gokū", the Japanese reading for Sun Wukong.
WWN-002 Mega Water S	メガウォーターS Mega Wōtā S	The smartest of the Genesis Units, in charge of brain labor, but is not very self-confident. He often fights with Buster Rod G. He is based on Sha Wujing from Journey to the West, and has a strange Japanese accent, due to being a kikokushijo expatriate. He is also based on a kappa. The S in his name stands for "Sa Gojō", the Japanese reading for Sha Wujing.
WWN-003 Hyper Storm H	ハイパーストームH Haipā Sutōmu H	The strongest of the Genesis Units, in charge of manual labor. He can't say no, but is easily manipulated, usually doing whatever is asked of him with no questions asked. He is based on Zhu Bajie from Journey to the West. He is laid back and doesn't like to fight with his comrades. The H in his name stands for "Hakkai" from the name Cho Hakkai, the Japanese reading for Zhu Bajie.

=== Robot Masters ===
Robot Masters are a special kind of robot mainly under Dr. Wily's control which possess advanced artificial intelligence. The system is jointly credited to Dr. Light and Dr. Wily, and most Robot Masters possess a unique identification code, consisting of a two-letter "series code" followed by one of N, No, or #, then a three-digit "serial number". They are generally humanoid in appearance, and often designed with specific purposes and human-like personalities and quirks. The list below is of the first six Robot Masters that Dr. Light built and Dr. Wily later reprogrammed, as well as two more that were added to Mega Man Powered Up to be consistent with other games.

==== Mega Man 1 / Mega Man Powered Up ====
These Robot Masters were created by Dr. Light and reprogrammed by Dr. Wily to serve him:

Series Number	Japanese Name	Short Description	Weapon	Weakness
DLN-003 Cut Man	Cut Man (カットマン Kattoman)	Cut Man was originally designed for land reclamation work, particularly deforestation. His battle abilities center on his advanced jumping abilities and the pair of boomerang-like shears on his head. As revealed in Mega Man: Powered Up, he is easily fooled, and can turn his scissors into a shuriken-like weapon. Cut Man also appears in the Captain N: The Game Master episode "Mega Trouble for Megaland", in Mega Man as one of Dr. Wily's henchmen, and in the Sega Saturn version of Mega Man 8 and Mega Man X8 in Optic Sunflower's stage if certain conditions are met. He is voiced by Reiko Takagi in Japanese and Elinor Holt in English.	Rolling Cutter R. Cutter (ローリングカッター, Rōringu Kattā)	Super Arm
DLN-004 Guts Man	Guts Man (ガッツマン Gattsuman)	Guts Man was also designed for land reclamation work, but was created specifically for construction of public works. He is able to lift objects of up to 80 tons over his head and hurl them at his foe. In Mega Man: Powered Up, he is depicted as being dim-witted, but well-meaning. He appears in Mega Man as one of Dr. Wily's henchmen, as well as in Mega Man 7, where a duplicate of him appears as the enhanced Guts Man G. He is voiced by Kenji Nomura in Japanese and Tommy James in English.	Super Arm S. Arm (スーパーアーム, Sūpā Āmu)	Hyper Bomb (MM1); Time Slow (MMPU)
DLN-005 Ice Man	Ice Man (アイスマン Aisuman)	Ice Man was originally designed for the exploration and mapping of regions far below temperatures that humans can withstand, as well as to supervise transportation of supplies to research teams. He later got the job of transporting materials in frozen food warehouses. He has the ability to shoot waves of super-chilled air from his mouth which is laced with liquid nitrogen and then crystallizes into a projectile. Mega Man: Powered Up reveals that he possibly has dissociative identity disorder and that his personality is like that of a soldier. He is voiced by Akemi Kanda in Japanese and Zoe Slusar in English.	Ice Slasher I. Slasher (アイススラッシャー, Aisu Surasshā)	Thunder Beam (MM1); Hyper Bomb (MMPU)
DLN-006 Bomb Man	Bomber Man (ボンバーマン Bonbaman)	Also known as Bomber Man. He was also designed for land reclamation work; he and Guts Man were originally intended to work as a pair, with Guts Man functioning as a foreman. He makes various explosives. He is voiced by Takayasu Usui in Japanese and Ryan Stockert in English.	Hyper Bomb H. Bomb (ハイパーボム, Haipā Bomu)	Fire Storm (MM1); Rolling Cutter (MMPU)
DLN-007 Fire Man	Fire Man (ファイヤーマン Faiyāman)	Fire Man was designed for waste management work, particularly incineration, and can withstand temperatures up to 8000 °C and generate heat. He attacks by surrounding himself in a circle of flame and shooting balls of fire; in Mega Man: Powered Up, his weapon is severely limited if the flames atop his head are extinguished. He speaks with a Texas accent and possesses a strong sense of justice, often stating that the "fires of justice burn hot". Like Bomb Man, he exhibits pyromaniacal traits, though not to the same extent as him. He is voiced by Hisashi Izumi in Japanese and Roger Rhodes in English.	Fire Storm F. Storm (ファイヤーストーム, Faiyā Sutūmu)	Ice Slasher
DLN-008 Elec Man	Elec Man (エレキマン Erekiman)	Elec Man was designed to oversee and control atomic energy power plants. At the time of his creation, he was often hailed as Dr. Light's greatest creation and boasts superhuman calculation speed and agility. He can be conceited and egotistical, but is generally responsible and competent. His weapon, the Thunder Beam, is a focused blast of electricity; in Mega Man: Powered Up, it was changed to moreclosely resemble Cloud Man's Thunder Bolt and he gains the ability to call down thunder blasts from the ceiling. Elec Man also appears in Super Smash Bros. for Nintendo 3DS and Wii U as an Assist Trophy. He is voiced by Kosuke Kobayashi in Japanese and Brendan Hunter in English.	Thunder Beam T. Beam (サンダービーム, Sandā Bīmu)	Rolling Cutter (MM1); Oil Slider (MMPU)
DLN-00A (Archie Comics) Time Man	Time Man (タイムマン Taimuman)	Time Man is a prototype and Dr. Light's first experiment with time manipulation and travel. His power source allows him to accelerate himself, making things around him appear to slow down. In Mega Man: Powered Up, he gains the ability to shoot purple clock hands made of energy. If he is the player character, then this modification is made by Dr. Light; otherwise, it is done by Dr. Wily. He is voiced by Sayaka Narita in Japanese and Mike Thiessen in English.	Time Slow T. Slow (タイムスロー, Taimu Surō)	Thunder Beam
DLN-00B (Archie Comics) Oil Man	Oil Man (オイルマン Oiruman)	Oil Man was designed to be a maintenance robot to lube and restore rusted parts on his fellow Robot Masters. His Oil Slider can either be shot at an enemy or ridden like a surfboard and used to stomp or run over enemies. However, both forms are extremely weak. In the Japanese version of Powered Up, Oil Man has a body the color of oil and large, pink lips. This was changed to a dark blue complexion and yellow lips in the Western release, with the Archie comic giving him a scarf that obscures his mouth, possibly due to association with blackface stereotypes. He is voiced by Atsushi Kisaichi in Japanese and Scott Roberts in English.	Oil Slider O. Slider (オイルスライダー, Oiru Suraidā)	Fire Storm

==== Mega Man 2 ====
These Robot Masters were the first line created solely by Dr. Wily to destroy Mega Man:

Series Number	Japanese Name	Short Description	Weapon
DWN-009 Metal Man	Metal Man (メタルマン Metaruman)	The first Robot Master built by Dr. Wily, who was based on Cut Man's design. His weapon, the Metal Blade, throws circular metal blades made of ceramic titanium. However, his armor makes him weak to his own weapon.	Metal Blade M. Blade
DWN-010 Air Man	Air Man (エアーマン Eāman)	Air Man has his face built into his torso and can use the propeller in his torso to perform wind attacks. His weapon, the Air Shooter, shoots a barrage of tornadoes.	Air Shooter A. Shooter
DWN-011 Bubble Man	Bubble Man (バブルマン Baburuman)	Bubble Man is built for underwater combat, but because of a defect in his systems, cannot walk on land. His weapon, the Bubble Lead, is made of sulfuric acid and be shot to travel along floors and reveal traps.	Bubble Lead B. Lead
DWN-012 Quick Man	Quick Man (クイックマン Kuikkuman)	Designed using Elec Man's design as a basis, Quick Man is made of lightweight materials that enable him to move at super-speed. His weapon, the Quick Boomerang, can be fired from the launcher on his right arm, either as a trio of homing projectiles or a series of short ranged but powerful cutting weapons. He is very pompous and proud of his speed, and has a rivalry with Turbo Man.	Quick Boomerang Q. Boomerang
DWN-013 Crash Man	Clash Man (クラッシュマン Kurasshuman)	Also known as Clash Man. He was designed using Bomb Man and Guts Man's designs as a basis, and has thick armor that can withstand explosions. His weapon, the Crash Bomber, attaches to objects before causing explosions.	Crash Bomber C. Bomber
DWN-014 Flash Man	Flash Man (フラッシュマン Furasshuman)	Created to challenge the everlasting idea to control time, his weapon, the Time Stopper, can stop time for a brief period. Despite enjoying pranking people, he cares deeply for his friends.	Time Stopper T. Stopper
DWN-015 Heat Man	Heat Man (ヒートマン Hītoman)	Created using the design of Fire Man as a basis, Heat Man has a body which is shaped like a Zippo lighter and is resistant to high sources of heat. His weapon, the Atomic Fire, can be charged to produce bursts of fire at temperatures of up to 12,000 degrees Celsius (21,632 degrees Fahrenheit).	Atomic Fire A. Fire
DWN-016 Wood Man	Wood Man (ウッドマン Uddoman)	Created by Dr. Wily using the wood of the hinoki cypress, Wood Man is made of wood and is friendly to the robotic animal robots on his stage. His weapon, the Leaf Shield, is a series of leaf-shaped sheets of metal that can be used for offense and defense.	Leaf Shield L. Shield

==== Mega Man 3 ====
Most of the Robot Masters listed here were created by Dr. Light and Dr. Wily at the time of their truce. They were created to mine the eight Energy Elements from different planets to power the peacekeeping robot Gamma, but they all went out of control.

Series Number	Japanese Name	Short Description	Weapon
DWN-017 Needle Man	Needle Man (ニードルマン Nīdoruman)	Created using the aspects of Metal Man's combat programming, Needle Man was designed to work in energy mines by breaking through rocks. His weapon, the Needle Cannon, shoots needles that are sharp enough to pierce 10-inch thick stones.	Needle Cannon N. Cannon
DWN-018 Magnet Man	Magnet Man (マグネットマン Magunettoman)	Magnet Man is a magnetic robot whose weapon, the Magnet Missile, can home in on enemies.	Magnet Missile M. Missile
DWN-019 Gemini Man	Gemini Man (ジェミニマン Jeminiman)	Gemini Man can create holographic copies of himself. His weapon, the Gemini Laser, is fast and reflective.	Gemini Laser G. Laser
DWN-020 Hard Man	Hard Man (ハードマン Hādoman)	Hard Man weighs 3 tons, or 6,000 pounds, and has a body made of ceratanium, making him durable, but also heavy (When his body falls to the ground, it will stun the player.). His weapon, the Hard Knuckle, can detach and shoot opponents.	Hard Knuckle H. Knuckle
DWN-021 Top Man	Top Man (タップマン Tappuman)	Top Man was used to search other planets for Energy Elements like the ones needed to build Gamma. His weapon, the Top Spin, rotates at high speeds.	Top Spin T. Spin
DWN-022 Snake Man	Snake Man (スネークマン Sunēkuman)	Snake Man was created to investigate narrow areas and survey topography on uninhabited planets. His weapon, the Search Snake, shoots snake-like missiles that move across the ground and up walls.	Search Snake S. Snake
DWN-023 Spark Man	Spark Man (スパークマン Supākuman)	Created to charge anything with electricity, Spark Man resembles a spark plug and has high voltage electrodes for hands. His weapon, the Spark Shot, fires shots of electricity.	Spark Shock S. Shock
DWN-024 Shadow Man	Shadow Man (シャドーマン Shadōman)	A mysterious robot that resembles a ninja and was discovered and remodeled by Dr. Wily. His weapon, the Shadow Blade, throws shurikens.	Shadow Blade S. Blade

==== Mega Man 4 ====
These Robot Masters were created by Dr. Cossack. Six of them were then remodeled into battle robots by Dr. Wily after he took Dr. Cossack's daughter Kalinka hostage to blackmail him, while two others were already specialized in combat from the start.

Series Number	Japanese Name	Short Description	Weapon
DWN-025 Bright Man	Bright Man (ブライトマン Buraitoman)	Bright Man was originally built to explore dark areas. His weapon, the Flash Stopper, emits a bright flash of light that freezes robots by triggering a safety mechanism that locks their movements.	Flash Stopper F. Stopper
DWN-026 Toad Man	Toad Man (トードマン Tōdoman)	Toad Man was originally built to help in the irrigation of crops during a drought. His weapon, the Rain Flush, creates artificial acid rain.	Rain Flush R. Flush
DWN-027 Drill Man	Drill Man (ドリルマン Doriruman)	Drill Man was originally built to dig at construction sites. His weapon, the Drill Bomb, launches explosive drills.	Drill Bomb D. Bomb
DWN-028 Pharaoh Man	Pharaoh Man (ファラオマン Faraoman)	Pharaoh Man was originally built to explore pyramids and tombs, with camera eyes suited for dark areas and a pharaoh motif serving to ward off curses. His weapon, the Pharaoh Shot, is an orange sphere charged with solar energy.	Pharaoh Shot / P. Shot Pharaoh Wave / P. Wave
DWN-029 Ring Man	Ring Man (リングマン Ringuman)	Ring Man was built specifically to fight and destroy Mega Man. His weapon, the Ring Boomerang, can penetrate through shields.	Ring Boomerang R. Boomerang
DWN-030 Dust Man	Dust Man (ダストマン Dasutoman)	Dust Man was originally built for sanitation. His weapon, the Dust Crusher, shoots a bomb encased in scrap metal debris.	Dust Crusher D. Crusher
DWN-031 Dive Man	Dive Man (ダイブマン Daibuman)	Dive Man has the A.I. functions of a submarine. His Dive Missile can home in on his opponents, but due to a flaw in his design, he can also send himself flying forwards like a torpedo.	Dive Missile D. Missile
DWN-032 Skull Man	Skull Man (スカルマン Sukaruman)	Skull Man was built as a combat robot. His weapon, the Skull Barrier, generates a skull-shaped energy shield.	Skull Barrier S. Barrier

==== Mega Man 5 ====
Dr. Wily created these Robot Masters in his next attempt to take over the world, and one of the robots he created in this time, Dark Man, framed Proto Man for a series of crimes, including the kidnapping of his own creator, Dr. Light.

Series Number	Japanese Name	Short Description	Weapon
DWN-033 Gravity Man	Gravity Man (グラビティーマン Gurabitīman)	Gravity Man uses a unit in his body to control gravity, which is also the power of his weapon, the Gravity Hold. He can also crush foes with his spiked helmet or blast them with his buster.	Gravity Hold G. Hold
DWN-034 Wave Man	Wave Man (ウェーブマン Wēbuman)	Wave Man was tasked with taking over the water quality administration. His weapon, the Water Wave, produces pressurized water.	Water Wave W. Wave
DWN-035 Stone Man	Stone Man (ストーンマン Sutōnman)	Stone Man was tasked with assisting Gyro Man into taking over a hanging garden. His weapon, the Power Stone, forms stone circles.	Power Stone P. Stone
DWN-036 Gyro Man	Gyro Man (ジャイロマン Jairoman)	Gyro Man was tasked with taking over a hanging garden and obtaining money from the admission fee. His weapon, the Gyro Attack, emits propeller-shaped blades that can move in any direction.	Gyro Attack G. Attack
DWN-037 Star Man	Star Man (スターマン Sutāman)	Star Man was tasked with taking over an abandoned satellite base that was orbiting Earth. His weapon, the Star Crash, creates a star-shaped energy barrier that can be thrown at enemies.	Star Crash S. Crash
DWN-038 Charge Man	Charge Man (チャージマン Chājiman)	Charge Man was tasked with guarding shipments en route to Dr. Wily's occupied areas. His weapon, the Charge Kick, creates shockwaves that damage enemies during a slide. He can only be damaged when he is walking.	Charge Kick C. Kick
DWN-039 Napalm Man	Napalm Man (ナパームマン Napāmuman)	Napalm Man was tasked with guarding Dr. Wily's secret weapons factory. His weapon, the Napalm Bomb, sends out a bomb that explodes upon contact.	Napalm Bomb N. Bomb
DWN-040 Crystal Man	Crystal Man (クリスタルマン Kurisutaruman)	Crystal Man was tasked with financing Dr. Wily's operations by creating artificial crystals. His weapon, the Crystal Eye, shoots a barrage of crystal orbs.	Crystal Eye C. Eye

==== Mega Man 6 ====
These Robot Masters were created for the First Annual Robot Tournament and were reprogrammed by Dr. Wily under the alias of Mr. X.

Series Number	Japanese Name	Short Description	Weapon
DWN-041 Blizzard Man	Blizzard Man (ブリザードマン Burizādoman)	Originally built by scientists from Canada and designed to monitor the weather in Antarctica, Blizzard Man had his meteorological equipment replaced with equipment that enables him to produce ice and snow. His weapon, the Blizzard Attack, produces ice crystals.	Blizzard Attack B. Attack
DWN-042 Centaur Man	Centaur Man (ケンタウロスマン Kentaurosuman)	Originally built by scientists from the Hellenic Republic and designed to work as an archaeological tour guide. His weapon, the Centaur Flash, causes space distortions.	Centaur Flash / C. Flash Centaur Arrow / C. Arrow
DWN-043 Flame Man	Flame Man (フレイムマン Fureimuman)	Originally built in the Kingdom of Saudi Arabia and designed to generate thermal power, Flame Man was modified for combat and gained the ability to fire attacks. His weapon, the Flame Blast, scorches opponents with flames that erupt from the ground.	Flame Blast F. Blast
DWN-044 Knight Man	Knight Man (ナイトマン Naitoman)	Originally built in the United Kingdom and designed for combat, Knight Man is said to have defeated 1,000 robots in his duels. His weapon, the Knight Crusher, sends a flail out across large distances.	Knight Crusher K. Crusher
DWN-045 Plant Man	Plant Man (プラントマン Purantoman)	Originally built in Brazil and designed to be a keeper for a botanical garden, Plant Man became its mascot and is said to talk to plants. His weapon, the Plant Barrier, creates a barrier of spotted flower petals.	Plant Barrier P. Barrier
DWN-046 Tomahawk Man	Tomahawk Man (トマホークマン Tomahōkuman)	Originally built in the United States and created for the First Annual Robot Tournament. His weapon, the Silver Tomahawk, throws tomahawks.	Silver Tomahawk S. Tomahawk
DWN-047 Wind Man	Wind Man (ウインドマン Uindoman)	Originally built in both People's Republic of China and Republic of China (Taiwan) and designed to work in agriculture and help with harvests. His weapon, the Wind Storm, generates powerful winds.	Wind Storm W. Storm
DWN-048 Yamato Man	Yamato Man (ヤマトマン Yamatoman)	Originally created for the First Annual Robot Tournament, Yamato Man was reprogrammed by Mr. X to serve him. His Yamato Spear can be shot out to pierce his targets. He was built in Japan.	Yamato Spear Y. Spear

==== Mega Man 7 ====
Four of the robots were programmed by Dr. Wily to activate and find him if he is not there to activate a certain code to keep them in stasis. They activated while Dr. Wily was in prison; after his escape, Wily obtained four more robots to serve him. Some of them were created by him, while others were stolen and modified for combat.

Series Number	Japanese Name	Short Description	Weapon
DWN-049 Freeze Man	Freeze Man (フリーズマン Furīzuman)	Freeze Man was originally built as a prototype robot for non-polluting energy. His weapon, the Freeze Cracker, shoots snowflake-shaped projectiles.	Freeze Cracker F. Cracker
DWN-050 Junk Man	Junk Man (ジャンクマン Jankuman)	Junk Man was created by Dr. Wily to help him search for spare parts for his robots. As he was made from old robot parts, electromagnetic forces are used to hold his parts together. His weapon, the Junk Shield, pulls piles of junk towards him and can also be used for offense.	Junk Shield J. Shield
DWN-051 Burst Man	Burst Man (バーストマン Bāsutoman)	Originally created to guard a chemical plant in Edo City. His weapon, the Danger Wrap, emits a bubble with a bomb in it to trap opponents.	Danger Wrap D. Wrap
DWN-052 Cloud Man	Cloud Man (クラウドマン Kuraudoman)	Originally created as a weather-controlling robot. His weapon, the Thunder Bolt, shoots lightning.	Thunder Bolt / T. Bolt Thunder Strike / T. Strike
DWN-053 Spring Man	Spring Man (スプリングマン Supuringuman)	Spring Man was created by Dr. Wily, with 2,000 springs being used to make him. His weapon, the Wild Coil, launches springs.	Wild Coil W. Coil
DWN-054 Slash Man	Slash Man (スラッシュマン Surasshuman)	Slash Man was created by Dr. Wily to clear the forests for the construction of his base. His weapon, the Slash Claw, slashes opponents with a wave-like cutting attack.	Slash Claw S. Claw
DWN-055 Shade Man	Shade Man (シェードマン Shēdoman)	Originally created as an amusement park attraction. His weapon, the Noise Crush sends out destructive sound waves. An easter egg in his stage causes the theme of Super Ghouls n' Ghosts to be used as background music.	Noise Crush N. Crush
DWN-056 Turbo Man	Turbo Man (ターボマン Tāboman)	Created by Dr. Wily used parts of his old dragster. He runs on petrol and can turn into a car. His weapon, the Scorch Wheel, is a wheel-shaped fire that rolls along the ground.	Scorch Wheel S. Wheel

==== Mega Man 8 ====
Some of the Robot Masters were created by Dr. Wily, while others were stolen and repurposed by him.

Series Number	Japanese Name	Short Description	Weapon
DWN-057 Tengu Man	Tengu Man (テングマン Tenguman)	Originally built as an experimental robot that can generate artificial typhoons. His weapon, the Tornado Hold, traps opponents in whirlwinds. Tengu Man later appears in Mega Man & Bass, where he serves King and wields the Tengu Blade, which slashes opponents.	Tornado Hold / T. Hold Tengu Blade / T. Blade
DWN-058 Astro Man	Astro Man (アストロマン Asutoroman)	Originally built to work in a planetarium. His weapon, the Astro Crush, rains down a meteor storm. Astro Man later appears in Mega Man & Bass, where he serves King and wields the Copy Vision, which creates a holographic double to attack.	Astro Crush / A. Crush Copy Vision / C. Vision
DWN-059 Sword Man	Sword Man (ソードマン Sōdoman)	Created to wield an ancient sword which Dr. Wily stole from a museum. The upper and lower parts of his body were fitted with an anti-gravitational device to stabilize him, allowing both halves of his body to act independently to improve balance. His weapon, the Flame Sword, is a sword engulfed in fire.	Flame Sword F. Sword
DWN-060 Clown Man	Clown Man (クラウンマン Kuraunman)	Originally designed for an amusement park. His weapon, the Thunder Claw, launches an elastic beam of electricity.	Thunder Claw T. Claw
DWN-061 Search Man	Search Man (サーチマン Sāchiman)	Created by Dr. Wily, Search Man is a two-headed robot designed like a camouflaged soldier. Because Dr. Wily forgot to add personality chips to both of the heads, he has one personality chip that switches between heads. His weapon, the Homing Sniper, launches missiles that lock on to opponents.	Homing Sniper H. Sniper
DWN-062 Frost Man	Frost Man (フロストマン Furosutoman)	Created by Dr. Wily from the leftover parts of Clown Man. Due to his large size, oil circulation in his body is poor. His weapon, the Ice Wave, sends a surge of freezing cold across the ground.	Ice Wave I. Wave
DWN-063 Grenade Man	Grenade Man (グレネードマン Gurenēdoman)	Created by Dr. Wily, Grenade Man enjoys using his explosives to cause destruction. His weapon, the Flash Bomb, causes explosion when launched.	Flash Bomb F. Bomb
DWN-064 Aqua Man	Aqua Man (アクアマン Akuaman)	Originally designed to work in the waterworks bureau and manage water. His weapon, the Water Balloon, launches spheres of water.	Water Balloon W. Balloon

==== Mega Man 9 ====
These Robot Masters were created by Dr. Light, with Dr. Wily tricking them into serving him after saving them from being scrapped, as their period of use had expired. After Mega Man was able to prove his innocence, Dr. Light managed to find them a purpose so that they wouldn't get decommissioned.

Series Number	Japanese Name	Short Description	Weapon
DLN-065 Concrete Man	Concrete Man (コンクリートマン Konkurītoman)	Concrete Man is a construction robot that was used to oversee the construction of a dam. His weapon, the Concrete Shot, shoots a block of concrete. During the credits, Concrete Man is seen in a picture chasing after Dr. Wily.	Concrete Shot C. Shot
DLN-066 Tornado Man	Tornado Man (トルネードマン Torunēdo Man)	Tornado Man was used to stave off powerful storms while working at a weather regulation facility. His weapon, the Tornado Blow, sends tornadoes out in multiple directions. During the credits, Tornado Man is seen in a picture looking at the sky with Mega Man.	Tornado Blow T. Blow
DLN-067 Splash Woman	Splash Woman (スプラッシュウーマン Supurasshu Ūoman)	Splash Woman is the first female Robot Master besides Roll. She resembles a mermaid, and was built to save people from sinking ships. Her weapon, the Laser Trident, emits a trident-shaped laser that can pierce shields. During the credits, Splash Woman is seen in a picture with Auto on the beach as Auto takes a picture of her.	Laser Trident L. Trident
DLN-068 Plug Man	Plug Man (プラグマン Puragu Man)	Plug Man was used to inspect the quality control in a television factory. His weapon, the Plug Ball, shoots out spark balls that travel across terrain to shock opponents. During the credits, Plug Man was seen in a picture going shopping with Rush.	Plug Ball P. Ball
DLN-069 Jewel Man	Jewel Man (ジュエルマン Jueru Man)	Jewel Man was used to work in a diamond mine and cut and polish rocks. His weapon, the Jewel Satellite, surrounds him with jewels that can also be used as projectiles. During the credits, Jewel Man is seen in a picture that shows him in a mine with Roll as he shows her a jewel he found.	Jewel Satellite J. Satellite
DLN-070 Hornet Man	Hornet Man (ホーネットマン Hōnettoman)	Hornet Man was used to oversee a flower park and pollinate flowers. His weapon, the Hornet Chaser, shoots out robotic bees to sting opponents. During the end credits, Hornet Man is seen in a picture tending to his garden along with Beat.	Hornet Chaser H. Chaser
DLN-071 Magma Man	Magma Man (マグママン Maguma Man)	Magma Man was used to oversee safety operations and manage a geothermal plant. His weapon, the Magma Bazooka, fires three hot magma balls. During the credits, Magma Man is seen in a picture warming up Dr. Light's bathing oil drum.	Magma Bazooka M. Bazooka
DLN-072 Galaxy Man	Galaxy Man (ギャラクシーマン Gyarakushīman)	Galaxy Man is a UFO-themed robot who can transform into a UFO and was used to work at a space research center and calculate the trajectory of rockets. His weapon, the Black Hole Bomb, fires a small orb that turns into a black hole upon exploding. During the credits, Galaxy Man is seen in a picture flying towards the sun in his UFO form as Proto Man watches him from a distance.	Black Hole Bomb B.H. Bomb

==== Mega Man 10 ====
These following Robot Masters contracted Roboenza, as Mega Man had to salvage parts of them to help Dr. Light find a cure for Roboenza.

Series Number	Japanese Name	Short Description	Weapon
DWN-073 Blade Man	Blade Man (ブレイドマン Bureidoman)	Blade Man was a tour guide to an ancient castle. His weapon, the Triple Blade, fires three blades in different directions.	Triple Blade T. Blade
DWN-074 Pump Man	Pump Man (ポンプマン Ponpu Man)	Pump Man worked at a waste water treatment plant and washed off graffiti. His weapon, the Water Shield, creates a shield of droplets which can also be used as projectiles.	Water Shield W. Shield
DWN-075 Commando Man	Commando Man (コマンドマン Komando Man)	Commando Man worked as a mine-sweeping robot that remote-detonated mines. His weapon, the Commando Bomb, fires out a missile that travels along a straight path.	Commando Bomb C. Bomb
DWN-076 Chill Man	Chill Man (チルドマン Chirudoman)	Chill Man worked as an arctic nature observation robot who watched for melting glaciers caused by global warming. His weapon, the Chill Spike, fires a gel that freezes upon hitting a surface and sends icy spikes towards opponents.	Chill Spike C. Spike
DWN-077 Sheep Man	Sheep Man (シープマン Shīpuman)	Sheep Man worked as a sheep-herding robot as well as for static resistance test division. His weapon, the Thunder Wool, emits a wool-shaped cloud that brings down thunderbolts.	Thunder Wool T. Wool
DWN-078 Strike Man	Strike Man (ストライクマン Sutoraiku Man)	Strike Man is a baseball-themed robot that worked as a batting practice robot. His weapon, the Rebound Striker, throws a ball that gets faster every time it bounces off a surface.	Rebound Striker R. Striker
DWN-079 Nitro Man	Nitro Man (ニトロマン Nitoro Man)	Nitro Man is a robot who can turn into a motorcycle and worked as a stunt robot in TV shows and movies. His weapon, the Wheel Cutter, shoots razor wheels at opponents.	Wheel Cutter W. Cutter
DWN-080 Solar Man	Solar Man (ソーラーマン Sōrā Man)	Solar Man worked in a sunlight research lab. His weapon, the Solar Blaze, shoots a fiery orb that splits into two directions.	Solar Blaze S. Blaze

==== Mega Man 11 ====
These Robot Masters have different manufacturers until they were captured during Dr. Light's maintenance on them and reprogrammed to serve Dr. Wily, who equipped them with the Double Gear. After Dr. Wily's plot is thwarted, Dr. Light and a Double Gear System-enhanced Auto recovered their bodies and worked to rebuild and restore them to normal.

Series Number	Japanese Name	Short Description	Gear Name	Weapon
DWN-081 Block Man	Block Man (ブロックマン Burokkuman)	"I'll drop you like a ton of bricksǃ" – Block Man Block Man is a stout robot manufactured by Nakaume Heavy Machinery that was used for exterior construction. His weapon, the Block Dropper, spawns four heavy blocks in the air which fall to strike opponents. He is voiced by Kazutomi Yamamoto in Japanese and Marc Swint in English.	Power Gear	Block Dropper B. Dropper
DWN-082 Fuse Man	Fuse Man (ヒューズマン Hyūzuman)	"High voltageǃ" – Fuse Man Fuse Man is an electrical robot created by O.D.A. Electronics to manage electronic equipment in a power plant. His weapon, the Scramble Thunder, launches a sphere of electricity that clings to surfaces and can be controlled in any direction. He is voiced by Makoto Furukawa in Japanese and Todd Haberkorn in English.	Speed Gear	Scramble Thunder S. Thunder
DWN-083 Blast Man	Blast Man (ブラストマン Burasutoman)	"Explosion... is ARTǃ" – Blast Man Blast Man is a robot created by B.B. Bomb Company to provide special effects for movies. His weapon, the Chain Blast, creates floating explosives that detonate. He is voiced by Tasuku Hatanaka in Japanese and Chris Hackney in English.	Power Gear	Chain Blast C. Blast
DWN-084 Acid Man	Acid Man (アシッドマン Ashiddo Man)	"Welcome to my chemical paradise." – Acid Man Acid Man is a chemist robot created by Mecha-Chuchets Institute of Robology. His weapon, the Acid Barrier, creates a shield of acid that can be shot towards opponents. He is voiced by Kōsuke Toriumi in Japanese and Christopher Corey Smith in English.	Speed Gear	Acid Barrier A. Barrier
DWN-085 Tundra Man	Tundra Man (ツンドラマン Tsundora Man)	"ICE OVERǃ UNDERǃ EVERYWHEREǃǃǃ" – Tundra Man Tundra Man is a robot created by Cossack Robot Laboratories to monitor the environmental changes in cold environments. His weapon, the Tundra Storm, creates a column of icy cold. He is voiced by Shinji Kawada in Japanese and by Michael T. Coleman in English.	Speed Gear	Tundra Storm T. Storm
DWN-086 Torch Man	Torch Man (トーチマン Tōchiman)	"Fall... to the fist of flameǃ" – Torch Man Torch Man is a robot created by Tsubakuro Precision Machining as an outdoor advisor to caution people about fire safety. His weapon, the Blazing Torch, fires a ball of red-hot fire diagonally into the air. He is voiced by Katsuyuki Konishi in Japanese and Jon Bailey in English.	Power Gear	Blazing Torch B. Torch
DWN-087 Impact Man	Pile Man (パイルマン Pairuman)	"PUNCHǃ PUMMELǃ PULVERIZEǃǃǃ" – Impact Man Impact Man, known as Pile Man in Japanese, is a robot created by Nakaume Heavy Machinery as a construction robot specializing in piling. When using the Power Gear, Impact Man can turn into a jackhammer. His weapon, the Pile Driver, sends a spike at opponents. He is voiced by Masaki Terasoma in Japanese and Jesse Merlin in English.	Power Gear	Pile Driver P. Driver
DWN-088 Bounce Man	Rubber Man (ラバーマン Rabāman)	"I bet you can't bounce like thisǃ" – Bounce Man Bounce Man, known as Rubber Man in Japanese, is a robot created through a joint R&D by Rebound Rubber and Momo's Robot Farm and used as a crash test robot and fitness instructor because of his bounciness and rubber skin. His weapon, the Bounce Ball, shoots three bouncy balls that can be tilted up and down before exploding. He is voiced by Yukari Tamura in Japanese and Bonnie Gordon in English.	Speed Gear	Bounce Ball B. Ball

==== Mega Man & Bass ====
Besides Tengu Man and Astro Man, the following Robot Masters were used by King as part of his robot revolution. Some of them were created by him, while others were modified.

Series Number	Japanese Name	Short Description	Weapon
KGN-001 Dynamo Man	Dynamo Man (ダイナモマン Dainamoman)	Dynamo Man used to work at a power plant as a tour guide for school field trips. His weapon, the Lightning Bolt, summons lightning.	Lightning Bolt L. Bolt
KGN-002 Cold Man	Cold Man (コールドマン Kōrudoman)	Cold Man was originally a refrigerator used at Dr. Light's laboratory to store prehistoric DNA. His weapon, the Ice Wall, creates a spiky wall of ice that is pushed towards opponents.	Ice Wall I. Wall
KGN-003 Ground Man	Ground Man (グランドマン Gurandoman)	Ground Man was created by King to excavate ruins and can turn into a drill-shaped vehicle. His weapon, the Spread Drill, is a drill-like missile that can split into three smaller drills.	Spread Drill S. Drill
KGN-004 Pirate Man	Pirate Man (パイレーツマン Pairētsuman)	Pirate Man was created by King to attack cargo vessels at sea. His weapon, the Remote Mine, is a remote-controlled bomb that detonates.	Remote Mine R. Mine
KGN-005 Burner Man	Burner Man (バーナーマン Bānā Man)	Burner Man was created by Wily to bring harm to natural environments. His weapon, the Wave Burner, is a short-ranged flamethrower.	Wave Burner W. Burner
KGN-006 Magic Man	Magic Man (マジックマン Majikkuman)	Magic Man was formerly a circus performer until he sided with King to show off his magic talents. His weapon, the Magic Card, steals energy from his opponents to restore health.	Magic Card M. Card

== Reception ==
Roll has proved popular amongst fans, who have created various ROM hacks and fangames to place her in the main role as a female counterpart to Mega Man. Theresa Romano from The Mary Sue said Roll had been the sole female robot in the franchise's universe to have made a lasting impression on the Mega Man fandom. She observed that Roll is notable for her constant character redesigns through the games or the animated series; for Romano, the most memorable iteration was the Ruby-Spears series version, whose arm could transform into different household appliances. Joshua Scullin from University of Washington Tacoma saw Roll as a better female character than the ones featured from Nintendo Entertainment System games as she is not reward for the main character but instead a powerful character on her own. However, her weaponry was still called out for her distinctive weapon. In Gaming Disability: Disability Perspectives on Contemporary Video Games, Roll is seen as a clean up messes in a more common approach to women in the 1980s in contrast to the heroic exploits of her brother, Mega Man.

== Mega Man X characters ==
The following is a list of recurring characters appearing in the Mega Man X series. Unless otherwise stated, each of these characters is a reploid; an artificially intelligent android. Names are organized in order of appearance, and characters who only appear in a single game are covered in the article for their corresponding game.

=== Maverick Hunters ===
The Maverick Hunters, known as Irregular Hunters (イレギュラーハンター, Iregyurā Hantā) are a group of Reploids who protect humans and other Reploids from Mavericks and are the heroes of the Mega Man X series, with its protagonists being prominent Maverick Hunters. When they are introduced in Mega Man X, they have existed for some time, having been founded by Dr. Cain, who has since retired. From Mega Man X onward, they battle Sigma and the other Mavericks.

==== X ====
X is the main protagonist of the Mega Man X series. Dr. Light created him, but feared the ramifications of giving robots free will and so chose to seal him inside a capsule for 30 years to test the integrity and reliability of his systems. Dr. Light died before X's diagnostics were complete, and 100 years later another scientist, Dr. Cain, discovered his capsule and attempted to emulate his technology. With X's help, Cain developed the first mass-produced Reploids: humanoid androids based upon X's designs.

==== Zero ====
Originally intended to be the protagonist of Mega Man X, he was recast as X's mentor and partner in favor of an X who looked "more like Mega Man". He is a top-class Maverick Hunter who undergoes inner turmoil over his mysterious past and purpose, which he seems to see glimpses of in nightmares, and the fact that the Virus does not affect him like it does with other reploids, who become Mavericks.

==== Axl ====
Voiced by (English): Lenne Hardt (X7); Jeffrey Watson (X8)
Voiced by (Japanese): Minami Takayama

Axl (アクセル, Akuseru) is a black and red-armored reploid with an X-shaped scar above his nose who wields a pair of handheld blaster pistols. He first appears in Mega Man X7, where he displays an ability called A-Trans, which allows him to take on the appearance and abilities of any reploid he defeats which matches his size, allowing him to explore normally inaccessible areas. He also has the ability to hover in midair and roll through enemy shots. While his gameplay style was originally similar to X, Mega Man X8 reworked his gameplay to give him a distinctive fighting style. His shots are now rapid-fire abilities and can fire in any direction, and instead of copying the Maverick weapons like X, he instead gains a new type of gun for each boss he defeats, which have unlimited ammo and can be fired either multi-directional or rapid-fire. While overall the weakest in power, Axl's fighting style relies more on speed compared to X's powerful but slower charge shots and Zero's swordplay.

==== Dr. Cain ====
Voiced by (English): Michael Shepherd
Voiced by (Japanese): Tadashi Miyazawa

Dr. Cain is a human archaeologist and robot expert, who serves as a supporting character throughout the Mega Man X games. He discovered the dormant X in the ruins of Dr. Light's lab, and soon after invented Reploids, sapient robots based on X's design, with the most notable being Sigma. Sigma, being the most advanced robot at the time, became the head of the Maverick Hunters, a group of reploids dedicated to destroying reploids that violate the three rules of robotics.

==== Iris ====
Voiced by (Japanese): Yūko Mizutani (PXZ); Aya Endō (X DiVE–present)

Repliforce scientists created Iris alongside her brother Colonel as one half of the "Perfect Soldier program", with Colonel being the other half. She was compassionate and peaceful, while Colonel was a strong-willed Reploid warrior. Repliforce scientists struggled to make these two factors into one Reploid, and because the differences were irreconcilable, they split them into brother and sister Reploids.

In Mega Man X4, Iris is one of the two characters alongside Double who can only be fought depending on whether the player chooses Zero or X.

==== Alia ====
Voiced by (English): Rumiko Varnes (X7); Marriete Sluyter (X8)
Voiced by (Japanese): Rumi Kasahara

Alia acts as a Navigator for the Maverick Hunters in Mega Man X5 and onwards. She began her career as a researcher in Reploid engineering alongside her colleague Gate, whom she was said to have feelings for. They were ahead of their time in their research on Reploids, though she contends that Gate was a better programmer than she was. However, Gate's inability to follow the rules made him a social outcast, and his creations were systematically destroyed, sometimes with Alia's assistance. She soon mastered programming languages and was chosen to be a spotter for the Hunters. In Mega Man X5, Alia served as the Hunters' spotter during the Sigma Virus outbreak, while lending her technical talents to the cause by uploading and letting X utilize the Falcon and Gaea armor.

==== Layer ====
Voiced by (English): Meredith Taylor Parry
Voiced by (Japanese): Sonoko Kawata

Layer is a navigator alongside Alia and Pallette in X8, with her high processing power allowing her to quickly determine enemy abilities. For the most part, Layer appears to be the oldest navigator and is calm and collected. However, she seems to show more concern for Zero, even blushing when talking to him. Palette's comment on how she "waited the whole time for him" seemingly implies that she has a crush on him. Layer is also a secret unlockable character in the game, and has gameplay similar to Zero's. She wields her own sword weapon, the "Layer Rapier", allowing her to use the same abilities as Zero, but cannot use his "Black Armor".

==== Pallette ====
Voiced by (English): Chris Simms
Voiced by (Japanese): Haruna Mima

Pallette is another navigator alongside Alia and Layer in X8 who excels at finding hidden routes at facilities, allowing X to find Dr. Light's armor capsules. She appears to be the most playful of the navigators and hates being ignored. Pallette is also an unlockable character in the game, taking after Axl's playstyle but being unable to use Axl's copy ability.

==== Douglas ====
Douglas is a mechanic for the Maverick Hunters. In Mega Man X5, he constructs modules for X and Zero and reinforces the Enigma Cannon and Space Shuttle with parts they gather from the Mavericks. During the Nightmare outbreak in X6, Douglas helps X and Zero by refining modules for them.

==== Signas ====
Voiced by (English): Robert Belgrade (X7); Roger Rhodes (X8)
Voiced by (Japanese): Hirotaka Suzuoki (X7); Tsuneyoshi Iwatsuru (X8)

Signas is the newest leader and commander of the Maverick Hunters, who is introduced in X5. He was originally a private investigator before being assigned to the Maverick Hunters, commanding missions and overseeing major operations. He is loyal to both humans and Reploids and is determined to ensure that all Mavericks are eliminated. He has the most advanced CPU of the current Reploids.

=== Mavericks ===
Mavericks, known as Irregulars (イレギュラー, Iregyurā) in Japan, are Reploids who have turned against humans, usually violently. Reploids can become Mavericks for a variety of reasons, such as a virus or their own free will. As the chronology of the Mega Man franchise progresses, the term "Maverick" comes to mean any individual or creature, human or Reploid, that presents a threat to civilization or those in power.

==== Sigma ====
Sigma (シグマ, Shiguma) is the primary antagonist of the Mega Man X series, who Dr. Cain considered to be the finest reploid of the time, with circuitry designs meant to prevent him from becoming a Maverick. He was once the leader of the Maverick Hunters, but during a mission, he came into contact with Zero, who at the time was rampaging after falling under the influence of the Zero Virus.

Prior to the first Mega Man X game, Sigma was the most advanced Reploid of his time and the leader of the Maverick Hunters. However, one day, the Maverick Hunters received reports of a powerful "Red Maverick" that had destroyed an entire squadron of Hunters. While investigating, Sigma and his unit tracked it down to an abandoned laboratory and learned that it was Zero, an evil robot that Dr. Wily created which carried the Maverick Virus. After Sigma defeated Zero, the virus was inadvertently transferred into him. While the virus was purged from Zero, turning him benevolent, the virus adapted to Sigma, becoming the Sigma Virus.

After gradually succumbing to the virus, he suddenly led a mass revolt among the Reploids, declaring total war on humans and seeking to carry out a genocide against them. Many Maverick Hunters chose to follow Sigma out of loyalty, leaving Zero in charge of the organization. X, the last creation of Dr. Light and the base model for the Reploids, decided to volunteer and joined Zero. X and Zero battle through the Maverick regime, and ultimately X destroys Sigma; however, while his physical body is scrapped, his "soul", the Virus, survives. After the end credits, Sigma's face appears on a blue monitor and warns X that he will be back.

Sigma returns in each installment of the series in various forms, but X defeats him each time. His final appearance is in Mega Man X8, where he is finally destroyed for good. However, the Sigma Virus remains, prompting the events of the Mega Man Zero series.

Sigma appears in the crossover game Marvel vs. Capcom: Infinite. In the story mode, he merges with Ultron to become "Ultron Sigma" to convert the inhabitants of both worlds into their slaves. Sigma as a playable character is available for purchase as standalone downloadable content or as part of the game's character pass.

Sigma was referenced in an episode of the 1994 cartoon, where X, Vile, and Spark Mandrill travel back in time, with his name being spelled as Cigma. He also appears in a short unlockable OVA in Mega Man Maverick Hunter X, "The Day of Σ", which depicts the Maverick Hunters prior to the events of the first Mega Man X game under Sigma's command, prior to his revolt.

==== Vile ====
Voiced by (English): Roger Rhodes
Voiced by (Japanese): Mugihito

Vile, known as VAVA (ヴァヴァ) in Japanese, is a recurring major villain in the Mega Man X series, who frequently reappears as a mid-game boss. He is first introduced in Mega Man X, where he is a former Maverick Hunter now serving Sigma as his right-hand man.

==== X-Hunters ====
The X-Hunters, known as the Counter Hunters (カウンターハンター, Kauntā Hantā) in Japan, are a group of three Mavericks formed to counter the Maverick Hunters and destroy X, who serve as the main antagonists of Mega Man X2. Its members are Violen (バイオレン, Baioren), the muscle and enforcer, Serges, known as Sagesse (サーゲス, Sāgesu) in Japan, the brains and scientist, and Agile (アジール, Ajīru), the speed and military strategist. They are among the few remaining followers in the Maverick rebellion and led a rebellion of their own after Sigma's death and took over the North Pole. They were also in possession of Zero's parts, which was part of their Unification Plan to rebuild him as a Maverick, and challenge X in a duel for the parts after some of their Mavericks are defeated. Each member is found in a secret area of a stage and will move to another stage. After X defeats them and recovers the three parts, he has a final battle with them at their lair and destroys them, eventually confronting a newly revived Sigma.

==== Dr. Doppler ====
Dr. Doppler (Dr.ドップラー, Doppurā) is the main antagonist of Mega Man X3. He is a Reploid researcher who was friends with Dr. Cain and supposedly discovered a cure for Maverick Reploids, founding a city, Dopple Town, in honor of it. When the supposedly cured reploids began causing riots in Dopple Town, the Maverick Hunters held Doppler accountable. After X and Zero defeat him, Doppler reveals that the viral form of Sigma corrupted him and ordered him to create a new body for him. Eventually, Zero learns that Dr. Doppler has the true antivirus and applies it to his Z-Saber to finish off Sigma and allow him and X himself to escape from Doppler's exploding laboratory. Alternatively, if Zero is injured, Dr. Doppler uses his body as the true antivirus and sacrifices himself.

==== Nightmare Police ====
The Nightmare Police (ナイトメアポリス, Naitomea Porisu) is a duo of Reploids who Dr. Doppler enlisted as law enforcement in Dopple Town to protect it before the uprising and joining his army, consisting of Bit, known as Vajurila FF (ヴァジュリーラＦＦ, Vajurīra FF) in Japan, the faster of the two, and Byte, known as Mandarela BB (マンダレーラBB, Mandarēra BB) in Japan, the stronger of the two. They are found and fought in the eight stages of Mega Man X3, where Doppler sends them to destroy X and Zero. If at least one of them is defeated but not destroyed, they combine to form Godkarmachine O Inary (ゴッドカルマシーン・O・イナリー, Goddokarumashīn O Inarī) in the first stage of Doppler's fortress, which is an upgrade received from Doppler after their first defeat.

==== Double ====
Double (ダブル, Daburu) is a supporting character in Mega Man X4. He befriends X during his mission and acts as his mission operator, but as X heads to the Final Weapon, Double reveals his true purpose as a spy Sigma sent to infiltrate the Maverick Hunters and unveils his true personality as a combat-loving sadist, cruelly taunting X about his naivety when defeated. After defeating some Maverick Hunters in their headquarters, Double pursues X inside the Final Weapon and reveals his true form to him, causing X to realize he was betrayed and confront and destroy him in combat.

His nickname is Jello Man, which predates the release of Mega Man X4 and comes from Capcom USA’s official X4 webpage in 1997, which displayed artwork of Double’s true form labeled with that name. This fans moniker stuck due to the character's distinctive visual design, featuring a tall, lean body filled with a pink fluid or gel, making him appear almost squishy and gelatinous, contrasting with his initial pudgy, spherical disguise.

==== Gate ====
Gate (ゲイト, Geito) is the main antagonist of Mega Man X6. He is a researcher who formerly worked with Alia and possessed knowledge far ahead of his peers. He was eventually exiled from the research community when his colleagues, including Alia, conspired to destroy his Reploids out of fear for their power and inability to be analyzed. Following the crash of Eurasia, Gate discovered a piece of Zero's DNA and became infected by traces of the Maverick virus within it. Obsessed with building his own utopia for only the most supreme Reploids, Gate created the Nightmare Virus and the Zero Nightmare, a clone of Zero, to instill fear in the population, then revived his Reploids as the "Nightmare Investigators", supposedly to protect them, but in reality to lead them to their deaths.

==== Isoc ====
Isoc is Gate's chief assistant, who appears in Mega Man X6. He is first seen giving a rousing speech to the Reploids and recruiting them as Nightmare Investigators. His true goal is to observe the effects of the Nightmare Virus and report them to Gate for further refinements. Isoc also shows an obsession with Zero, claiming that he knows everything about him.

==== High Max ====
High Max, known as HI-MAX (ハイマックス, Hai Makkusu) in Japan, is an antagonist in Mega Man X6. He was created by Gate as the ultimate Reploid, using DNA taken from Zero to make him powerful and resistant to damage. As the leader of the Nightmare Investigators, High Max is assigned with seeking out and destroying the Zero Nightmare as part of Gate's farce to lead the "low-grade" Reploids to their deaths.

==== Red ====
Voiced by (English): Barry Gjerde
Voiced by (Japanese): Akio Ōtsuka

Red appears in Mega Man X7 as the main antagonist and the leader of Red Alert, an anti-Maverick mercenary group that rose to prominence in place of the Maverick Hunters. He adopted and trained Axl, who looked up to him as a father figure. After Red met with Sigma. who claimed that he could increase his power, he began acting unusual. Soon after, Axl fled for his life, ultimately seeking asylum with the Maverick Hunters.

==== Lumine ====
Voiced by (English): Elinor Holt
Voiced by (Japanese): Junko Noda

Lumine is the main antagonist of Mega Man X8. He is a new generation Reploid that can transform into other Reploids. At the beginning of X8, Lumine is introduced as the director of the Jakob project. He is soon kidnapped by Vile due to his knowledge of the elevator. After defeating Sigma on normal or hard mode, Lumine is revealed to have been manipulating a weakened Sigma and is carrying out his plans. He goes on to claim that this was Sigma's final death and that he would be unable to return.

==== Maverick Bosses ====
These Maverick Bosses appear in the Mega Man X games and used to be members of the Maverick Hunters.

===== Mega Man X / Mega Man Maverick Hunter X =====
Name	Japanese Name	Basis	Short description	Weapon
Chill Penguin	Icy Penguigo (アイシー・ペンギーゴ, Aishī Pengīgo)	King penguin	A king penguin-themed Reploid that used to work in the 13th Polar Unit at the South Pole. He is voiced by Ryuzo Ishino in Japanese and Dean Galloway in English.	Shotgun Ice (ショットガンアイス, Shottogan Aisu)
Spark Mandrill	Spark Mandriller (スパーク・マンドリラー, Supāku Mandorirā)	Mandrill	A mandrill-themed Reploid that used to work in the 17th Elite Unit. Spark Mandrill appeared in the Mega Man episode "Mega X", speaking in a Russian accent. He accompanied Vile to the present where they collaborated with Dr. Wily. Both of them were defeated by a time-traveling Mega Man X. He is voiced by Takashi Nagasako in Japanese and Randy Brososky in English.	Electric Spark (エレクトリックスパーク, Erekutorikku Supāku)
Armored Armadillo	Armor Armarge (アーマー・アルマージ, Āmā Arumāji)	Armadillo	An armadillo-themed Reploid that used to be leader of the 8th Armored Unit and is an expert at fighting underground. He is voiced by Kenta Miyake in Japanese and Noah Umholtz in English.	Rolling Shield (ローリングシールド, Rōringu Shīrudo)
Launch Octopus	Launcher Octopuld (ランチャー・オクトパルド, Ranchā Okutoparudo)	Octopus	An octopus-themed Reploid who used to work in the 6th Naval Unit. He is voiced by Tetsuharu Ota in Japanese and Jonathan Love in English.	Homing Torpedo (ホーミングトーピード, Homingu Topido)
Boomer Kuwanger (ブーメル・クワンガー, Būmeru Kuwangā) known in the English version of Maverick Hunter X as "Boomerang Kuwanger"		Stag beetle	A stag beetle-themed Reploid who used to work in the 17th Elite Unit. He is voiced by Hisashi Izumi in Japanese and Ethan Cole in English.	Boomerang Cutter (ブーメランカッター, Būmeran Kattā)
Sting Chameleon	Sting Chameleao (スティング・カメリーオ, Sutingu Kamerīo)	Chameleon	A chameleon-themed Reploid who used to work in the 9th Special Unit. He is voiced by Hiroshi Shimozaki in Japanese and Roger Rhodes in English.	Chameleon Sting (カメレオンスティング, Kamereon Sutingu)
Storm Eagle	Storm Eagleed (ストーム・イーグリード, Sutōmu Īgurīdo)	Eagle	An eagle-themed Reploid who used to lead the 7th Airborne Unit. He is voiced by Daisuke Kageura in Japanese and Tommy James in English.	Storm Tornado (ストームトルネード, Sutōmu Torunēdo)
Flame Mammoth	Burnin' Noumander (バーニン・ナウマンダー, Bānin Naumandā)	Naumann's elephant	A Naumann's elephant-themed Maverick who used to work in the 4th Land Unit. He is voiced by Kenta Miyake in Japanese and Gerald Matthews in English.	Fire Wave (ファイヤーウェーブ, Faiyā Wēbu)

===== Mega Man X2 =====
Name	Japanese Name	Basis	Short description	Weapon
Wheel Gator	Wheel Alligates (ホイール・アリゲイツ, Hoīru Arigeitsu)	Alligator	An alligator-themed Reploid who used to work in the 6th Naval Unit.	Spin Wheel (スピンホイール, Supin Hoīru)
Bubble Crab	Bubbly Crablos (バブリー・クラブロス, Baburī Kuraburosu)	Crab	A crab-themed Reploid who used to work in the 6th Naval Unit.	Bubble Splash (バブルスプラッシュ, Baburu Supurasshu)
Flame Stag	Flame Stagger (フレイム・スタッガー, Fureimu Sutaggā)	Deer	A deer-themed Reploid who used to work in the 17th Elite Unit.	Speed Burner, known in Japan as Rushing Burner (ラッシングバーナー, Rasshingu Bānā)
Morph Moth	Metamor Mothmenos (メタモル・モスミーノス, Metamoru Mosumīnosu)	Bagworm moth	An unused bagworm moth-themed Reploid. No other background information available.	Silk Shot, known in Japan as Scrap Shoot (スクラップシュート, Sukurappu Shūto)
Magna Centipede	Magne Hyakulegger (マグネ・ヒャクレッガー, Magune Hyakureggā)	Centipede	A centipede-themed Reploid that used to work in the Special 0 Unit that was brainwashed into serving Sigma.	Magnet Mine (マグネットマイン, Magunetto Main)
Crystal Snail	Cristar Mymine (クリスター・マイマイン, Kurisutā Maimain)	Snail	A snail-themed Reploid. No other background information available except for some rumors that he was a criminal before joining the X-Hunters.	Crystal Hunter (クリスタルハンター, Kurisutaru Hantā)
Overdrive Ostrich	Sonic Ostreague (ソニック・オストリーグ, Sonikku Osutorīgu)	Ostrich	A super-fast ostrich-themed Reploid who used to work in the 7th Airborne Unit until an accident that cost him the ability to fly caused him to retire.	Sonic Slicer (ソニックスライサー, Sonikku Suraisā)
Wire Sponge	Wire Hetimarl (ワイヤー・ヘチマール, Waiyā Hechimāru)	Sponge gourd	A sponge gourd-themed Reploid with a personality disorder who was created in Sigma's Maverick-Producting Factories.	Strike Chain (ストライクチェーン, Sutoraiku Chēn)

===== Mega Man X3 =====
Most of the Maverick Hunters here were corrupted by Dr. Doppler's Sigma Virus:

Name	Japanese Name	Basis	Short description	Weapon
Blast Hornet	Explose Horneck (エクスプローズ・ホーネック, Ekusupurōzu Hōnekku)	Hornet	A hornet-themed Reploid who was known for his calm composure and cool judgment.	Parasitic Bomb (パラスティックボム, Parasutikku Bomu)
Blizzard Buffalo	Frozen Buffalio (フローズン・バッファリオ, Furōzun Baffario)	Bison	A bison-themed Reploid that used to work as a ski slope security guard.	Frost Shield (フロストシールド, Furosuto Shīrudo)
Toxic Seahorse	Acid Seaforce (アシッド・シーフォース, Ashiddo Shīfōsu)	Seahorse	A seahorse-themed Reploid with a unique liquid metal body. No other background information available.	Acid Burst, known in Japan as Acid Rush (アシッドラッシュ, Ashiddo Rasshu)
Tunnel Rhino	Screw Masaider (スクリュー・マサイダー, Sukuryū Masaidā)	Rhinoceros	A rhinoceros-themed Reploid that used to work as a miner in the Energem Crystal Mine.	Tornado Fang (トルネードファング, Torunēdo Fangu)
Volt Catfish	Electro Namazuros (エレキテル・ナマズロス, Erekiteru Namazurosu; Elekiter Namazuros)	Electric catfish	An electric catfish-themed Reploid who used to provide power to cities in the event of blackouts or other emergencies.	Triad Thunder (トライアードサンダー, Toraiādo Sandā)
Crush Crawfish	Scissors Shrimper (シザーズ・シュリンプァー, Shizāzu Shurinpuā)	Crayfish	A crayfish-themed Reploid who was originally designed for military use until a flaw in his A.I. was found.	Spinning Blade (スピニングブレード, Supiningu Burēdo)
Neon Tiger	Shining Tigerd (シャイニング・タイガード, Shainingu Taigādo)	Tiger	A tiger-themed Reploid who used to work at the nature reserve in Dopple Town apprehending poachers.	Ray Splasher (レイスプラッシャー, Rei Supurasshā)
Gravity Beetle	Gravity Beetbood (グラビティ・ビートブード, Gurabiti Bītobūdo)	Japanese rhinoceros beetle	A Japanese rhinoceros beetle who used to work in the 17th Elite Unit. He is the brother of Boomer Kuwanger.	Gravity Well, known in Japan as Bug Hole (バグホール, Bagu Hōru)

===== Mega Man X4 =====
Name	Japanese Name	Basis	Short description	Weapon X obtains	Weapon Zero obtains	Affiliation
Web Spider	Web Spidus (ウェブ・スパイダス, Webu Supaidasu)	Spider	A spider-themed Reploid who is a member of the Repliforce's Reploid Special Force and a former member of the Special 0 Unit.	Lightning Web (ライトニングウェブ, Raitoningu Webu)	Raijingeki (雷神撃, lit. "Raijin Attack" or "Thunder God Attack")	Repliforce; Research
Split Mushroom (スプリット・マシュラーム, Supuritto Mashurāmu)		Mushroom	A mushroom-themed Reploid who used to be the administrator of a Bio Laboratory.	Soul Body (ソウルボディ, Souru Bodi)	Kuuenbu (空円舞, lit. "Air Waltz") and Kuuenzan (空円斬, lit. "Air Circling Slash")	Mavericks
Cyber Peacock	Cyber Kujacker (サイバー・クジャッカー, Saibā Kujakkā)	Peafowl	A peafowl-themed Reploid that started out as the A.I. of a protection program.	Aiming Laser (エイミングレーザー, Eimingu Rēzā)	Rakuhouha (落鳳破, lit. "Falling Feng Crush")	Mavericks
Storm Owl	Storm Fukuroul (ストーム・フクロウル, Sutōmu Fukurouru)	Owl	An owl-themed Reploid and old friend of Storm Eagle.	Double Cyclone (ダブルサイクロン, Daburu Saikuron)	Tenkuuha (天空覇, lit. "Aether Rule")	Repliforce; Air Force
Magma Dragoon	Magmard Dragoon (マグマード・ドラグーン, Magumādo Doragūn)	Dragon	A dragon-themed Reploid and martial arts expert who used to lead the 14th Special Unit.	Rising Fire (ライジングファイア, Raijingu Faia)	Ryuenjin (龍炎刃, lit. "Dragon Flame Blade")	Mavericks
Frost Walrus	Frost Kibatodos (フロスト・キバトドス, Furosuto Kibatodosu)	Walrus	A walrus-themed Reploid and member of Repliforce.	Frost Tower (フロストタワー, Furosuto Tawā)	Hyouretsuzan (氷烈斬, lit. "Ice Fury Slash")	Repliforce; Polar Forces
Jet Stingray	Jet Stingren (ジェット・スティングレン, Jetto Sutinguren)	Stingray	A stingray-themed Reploid and member of Repliforce.	Ground Hunter (グランドハンター, Gurando Hantā)	Hienkyaku (飛燕脚, lit. "Flying Swallow Legs")	Repliforce; Navy
Slash Beast	Slash Beastleo (スラッシュ・ビストレオ, Surasshu Bisutoreo)	Lion	A lion-themed Reploid and member of Repliforce.	Twin Slasher (ツインスラッシャー, Tsuin Surasshā)	Shippuuga (疾風牙, lit. "Hurricane Fang")	Repliforce; Railroad

===== Mega Man X5 =====
Name	Japanese Name	Original English Name	Basis	Short description	Weapon X obtains	Weapon Zero obtains
Crescent Grizzly (クレッセント・グリズリー, Kuressento Gurizurī)		Grizzly Slash	Grizzly bear	A grizzly bear-themed Reploid who worked as an arms dealer in Siberia before being infected with the Sigma Virus. He has a grudge against Zero.	Crescent Shot (クレッセントショット, Kuressento Shotto)	C-Sword, known in Japan as Mikazukizan (三日月斬, lit. "Crescent Moon Slash/Three Day Moon Slash")
Tidal Whale	Tidal Makkoeen (タイダル・マッコイーン, Taidaru Makkoīn)	Duff McWhalen	Sperm whale	A sperm whale-themed Reploid who used to work as an oceanography museum curator and was the captain of a maritime security force before being infected with the Sigma Virus.	Goo Shaver, known in Japan as Gel Shaver (ジェルシェイバー, Jeru Sheibā)	F-Splasher, known in Japan as Hisuishou (飛水翔, lit. "Flying Water Soar")
Volt Kraken (ボルト・クラーケン, Boruto Kurāken)		Squid Adler	Kraken	A kraken-themed Reploid who used to work in the 6th Naval Unit and later became infected with the Sigma Virus. He is an old friend of Launch Octopus and was corrupted by the Sigma Virus before he can surrender a part of a laser device to the Maverick Hunters.	Tri-Thunder (トライサンダー, Torai Sandā)	E-Blade, known in Japan as Denjin (電刃, lit. "Electric Blade")
Shining Firefly	Shining Hotarunicus (シャイニング・ホタルニクス, Shainingu Hotarunikusu)	Izzy Glow	Firefly	A firefly-themed Reploid and the world's largest researcher in laser technology who got infected by the Sigma Virus. The Maverick Hunters put Shining Firefly out of his misery before he can become a full Maverick.	Flash Laser, known in Japan as Will Laser (ウイルレーザー, Uiru Rēzā)	C-Flasher, known in Japan as Messenkou (滅閃光, lit. "Destruction Flash")
Dark Necrobat (ダーク・ネクロバット, Dāku Nekurobatto)		Dark Dizzy	Vampire bat	A vampire bat-themed Reploid created by Sigma three years before the events of the video game.	Dark Hold (ダークホールド, Dāku Hōrudo)	
Spiral Pegasus	Spiral Pegacion (スパイラル・ペガシオン, Supairaru Pegashion)	The Skiver	Pegasus	A Pegasus-themed Reploid that used to work for Repliforce and began overseeing an air force base staffed with remnants of Repliforce's air wing before becoming infected with the Sigma Virus.	Wing Spiral (ウイングスパイラル, Uingu Supairaru)	W-Shredder, known in Japan as Shippū (疾風, lit. "Hurricane")
Burn Dinorex (バーン・ディノレックス, Bān Dinorekkusu)		Mattrex	Tyrannosaurus	A Tyrannosaurus-themed Reploid and member of Repliforce's disaster prevention team who later operated in a Somalian volcano. There was no indication on if he was infected with the Sigma Virus or not.	Ground Fire (グランドファイア, Gurando Faia)	Quake Blazer, known in Japan as Danchien (断地炎, lit. "Severing Earth Flame")
Spike Rosered (スパイク・ローズレッド, Supaiku Rōzureddo)		Axle the Red	Rose	A rose-themed Reploid who was the result of a very rare mutation between a Reploid, the Ukrainian Jungle's control unit, and the Sigma Virus.	Spike Ball, known in Japan as Spike Rope (スパイクロープ, Supaiku Rōpu)	Twin Dream, known in Japan as Sougenmu (双幻夢, lit. "Twin Phantasm")

===== Mega Man X6 =====
Name	Japanese Name	Basis	Short description	Weapon X obtains	Weapon Zero obtains
Commander Yammark (コマンダー・ヤンマーク, Komandā Yanmāku)		Dragonfly	A dragonfly-themed Reploid and one of the Nightmare Investigators that was investigating the Zero Nightmare Phenomenon.	Yammar Option (ヤンマーオプション, Yanmā Opushon)	
Ground Scaravich (グランド・スカラビッチ, Gurando Sukarabicchi)		Dung beetle	A dung beetle-themed Reploid and one of the Nightmare Investigators that was investigating the Zero Nightmare Phenomenon. He was also a known treasure hunter.	Ground Dash (グランドダッシュ, Gurando Dasshu)	Sentsuizan (旋墜斬, lit. "Whirling Crash Slash")
Blaze Heatnix (ブレイズ・ヒートニックス, Bureizu Hītonikkusu)		Phoenix	A phoenix-themed Reploid and one of the Nightmare Investigators that was investigating the Zero Nightmare Phenomenon who used to explore subterranean hot spots.	Magma Blade (マグマブレード, Maguma Burēdo)	Shoenzan (翔炎山, lit. "Soaring Flame Mountain")
Blizzard Wolfang (ブリザード・ヴォルファング, Burizādo Vorufangu)		Arctic wolf	An arctic wolf-themed Reploid created by Gate and one of the Nightmare Investigators that was investigating the Zero Nightmare Phenomenon who used to work for a sub-zero environment land development team.	Ice Burst (アイスバースト, Aisu Bāsuto)	Hyoroga (氷狼牙, lit. "Ice Wolf Fang")
Rainy Turtloid (レイニー・タートロイド, Reinī Tātoroido)		Turtle	A turtle-themed Reploid created by Gate who used to work for a water purification team.	Meteor Rain (メテオレイン, Meteo Rein)	Ensuizan (円水斬, lit. "Circling Water Slash")
Metal Shark Player	Metalshark Prayer (メタルシャーク・プレイヤー, Metarushāku Pureiyā)	Hammerhead shark	A hammerhead shark-themed Reploid created by Gate and one of the Nightmare Investigators. He used to work for a recycling research team.	Metal Anchor (メタルアンカー, Metaru Ankā)	Rakukojin (落鋼刃, lit. "Falling Steel Blade")
Shield Sheldon	Shieldner Sheldon (シールドナー・シェルダン, Shīrudonā Sherudan)	Giant clam	A giant clam-themed Reploid created by Gate and one of the Nightmare Investigators. He was formerly a bodyguard for important people.	Guard Shell (ガードシェル, Gādo Sheru)	
Infinity Mijinion (インフィニティー・ミジニオン, Infinitī Mijinion)		Water flea	A water flea-themed Reploid created by Gate and one of the Nightmare Investigators. He was formerly a test pilot for large manned weapons.	Ray Arrow, known in Japan as Arrow Ray (アローレイ, Arō Rei)	Rekkoha (裂光覇, lit. "Rending Light Rule")

===== Mega Man X7 =====
The following are known members of the vigilante group Red Alert:

Name	Japanese Name	Basis	Short description	Weapon X obtains	Weapon Axl obtains	Weapon Zero obtains
Soldier Stonekong (ソルジャー・ストンコング, Sorujā Sutonkongu)		Gorilla	A gorilla-themed Reploid and bounty hunter.	Gaea Shield (ガイアシールド, Gaia Shīrudo)		Gokumonken (獄門剣, lit. "Prison Gate Sword")
Tornado Tonion	Tornado Debonion (トルネード・デボニオン, Torunēdo Debonion)	Onion	An onion-themed Reploid who enjoyed entertaining others. He is one of a few Mavericks that aren't based on an animal.	Volt Tornado, known in Japan as Voltornado (ボルトルネード, Borutorunēdo)	Volt Tornado, known in Japan as Voltornado (ボルトルネード, Borutorunēdo) and Ray Gun (レイガン, Rei Gan)	Raijinshou (雷神昇, lit. "Raijin Rise" or "Thunder God Rise")
Splash Warfly (スプラッシュ・ウオフライ, Supurasshu Uofurai)		Flying fish	A flying fish-themed Reploid and bounty hunter. He is voiced by Kenta Miyake in Japanese and Noah Umholtz in English.	Splash Laser (スプラッシュレーザー, Supurasshu Rēzā)		Suiretsusen (水烈閃, lit. "Water Fury Flash") and D Glaive
Flame Hyenard (フレイム・ハイエナード, Fureimu Haienādo)		Hyena	A hyena-themed Reploid and bounty hunter.	Circle Blaze (サークルブレイズ, Sākuru Bureizu)	Circle Blaze (サークルブレイズ, Sākuru Bureizu) and Double Bullet (ダブルバレット, Daburu Baretto)	Bakuenjin (爆炎陣, lit. "Bursting Flame Array")
Ride Boarski	Hellride Inobusky (ヘルライド・イノブスキー, Heruraido Inobusukī)	Wild boar	A wild boar-themed Reploid and bounty hunter who can transform into a motorcycle.	Moving Wheel (ムービンホイール, Mūbin Hoīru)		Zankourin (斬光輪, lit. "Slashing Light Ring")
Snipe Anteator	Snipe Ariquick (スナイプ・アリクイック, Sunaipu Arikuikku)	Anteater	An anteater-themed Reploid and bounty hunter.	Sniper Missile (スナイパミサイル, Sunaipā Misairu)		Hieijin (飛影刃, lit. "Flying Shadow Blade")
Wind Crowrang	Wind Karasting (ウィンド・カラスティング, Windo Karasutingu)	Crow	A crow-themed Reploid and bounty hunter.	Wind Cutter (ウィンドカッター, Windo Kattā)		Souenbu (双燕舞, lit. "Twin Swallow Dance") and V Hanger
Vanishing Gungaroo	Vanishing Gungaroon (バニシング・ガンガルン, Banishingu Gangarun)	Kangaroo	A kangaroo-themed Reploid and bounty hunter.	Explosion (エクスプロージョン, Ekusupurōjon)	Explosion (エクスプロージョン, Ekusupurōjon) and G-Launcher (Gランチャー, G Ranchā)	Hadangeki (波断撃, lit. "Wave Severing Attack")

===== Mega Man X8 =====
Name	Japanese Name	Basis	Short description	Weapon X and Alia obtain	Weapon Zero and Layer obtain	Weapon Axl and Palette obtain
Bamboo Pandamonium	Bamboo Pandemonium (バンブー・パンデモニウム, Banbū Pandemoniumu)	Giant panda	A giant panda-themd Reploid who operated at Booster Forest until it was abandoned and he sided with the Mavericks. He is voiced by Sazame Manda in Japanese and Jonathan Love in English.	Green Spinner (グリーンスピナー, Gurīn Supinā)	Youdantotsu (葉断突, lit. "Leaf Severing Thrust")	Blast Launcher (ブラストランチャー, Burasuto Ranchā)
Optic Sunflower	Optic Sunfloward (オプティック・サンフラワード, Oputikku Sanfurawādo)	Sunflower	A sunflower-themed Reploid who originally ran Troia Base which was used as virtual Hunter training facility before he became a Maverick. He is one of a few Mavericks that aren't based on an animal. He is voiced by Turkey in Japanese and Elinor Holt in English.	Shining Ray (シャイニングレイ, Shainingu Rei)	Tenshouha (天照覇, lit. "Amaterasu/Heaven Shine Rule")	Ray Gun (レイガン, Rei Gan)
Dark Mantis	Darkneid Kamakil (ダークネイド・カマキール, Dākuneido Kamakīru)	Mantis	A mantis-themed Reploid who was in charge of security for an underground facility until he became a Maverick and sided with Sigma. He is voiced by Tsuneyoshi Iwatsuru in Japanese and Tommy James in English.	Shadow Runner (シャドウランナー, Shadou Rannā)	Rasetsusen (螺刹旋, lit. "Swirling Temple Whirl")	Black Arrow (ブラックアロー, Burakku Arō)
Gravity Antonion	Gravitate Ant-Onion (グラビテイト・アントニオン, Gurabiteito Antonion)	Ant	An ant-themed Reploid who was the lead researcher of an anti-gravity research institute until he became a Maverick and sided with Sigma. He is voiced by Hayata Ishida in Japanese and Roger Rhodes in English.	Squeeze Bomb (スクィーズボム, Sukuīzu Bomu)	Juuhazan (重波斬, lit. "Heavy Wave Slash")	Spiral Magnum (スパイラルマグナム, Supairaru Magunamu)
Earthrock Trilobyte	Earthrock Torirovich (アースロック・トリロビッチ, Āsurokku Torirobicchi)	Trilobite	A trilobite-themed Reploid who was in charge of a Rare Metal mine until he became a Maverick and sided with Sigma. He is voiced by Kyozo Kudo in Japanese and Randall Wiebe in English.	Crystal Wall (クリスタルウォール, Kurisutaru Wōru)	Rekkyoudan (烈鏡断, lit. "Violent Mirror Severing")	Bound Blaster (バウンドブラスター, Baundo Burasutā)
Gigabolt Man-O-War	Gigabolt Dokragen (ギガボルト・ドクラーゲン, Gigaboruto Dokurāgen)	Portuguese man o' war	A Portuguese man o' war-themed Reploid who originally supplied energy to Megalopolis until he became a Maverick and sided with Sigma while claiming that he didn't turn Maverick. He is voiced by Haruna Mima in Japanese and Mariette Sluyter in English.	Thunder Dancer (サンダーダンサー, Sandā Dansā)	Raikousen (雷光閃, lit. "Lightning Flash")	Plasma Gun (プラズマガン, Purazuma Gan)
Avalanche Yeti	Ice-Snow Yetinger (アイスノー・イエティンガー, Aisunō Ietingā)	Yeti	A Yeti-themed Reploid who worked at an environment research facility in Antarctica until he became a Maverick and sided with Sigma. He is voiced by Yoichi Sasayama in Japanese and Dave Pettitt in English.	Drift Diamond (ドリフトダイヤモンド, Dorifuto Daiyamondo)	Hyouryuushou (氷龍昇, lit. "Ice Dragon Rise")	Ice Gatling (アイスガトリング, Aisu Gatoringu)
Burn Rooster	Burn Kokekokker (バーン・コケコッカー, Bān Kokekokkā)	Rooster	A rooster-themed Reploid who worked at a waste management disposal center until he became a Maverick and sided with Sigma. He is voiced by Kyozo Kudo in Japanese and Jonathan Love in English.	Melt Creeper (メルトクリーパー, Meruto Kurīpā)	Enkoujin (焔降刃, lit. "Blaze Dropping Blade")	Flame Burner (フレイムバーナー, Fureimu Bānā)

== Mega Man Zero / Mega Man ZX characters ==
=== Ciel ===
Voiced by (Japanese): Rie Tanaka (X DiVE)

Dr. Ciel is a supporting protagonist of the Mega Man Zero series. A human scientist, Ciel sought out the legendary Reploid hero, Zero, to fight back against the tyranny of Neo Arcadia, leading the Resistance to support him. She would later become the creator of the main six Biometals and founder of the Guardians in the Mega Man ZX series.

=== Alouette ===
Alouette is a supporting character in the Mega Man Zero series. One of many Reploids from Neo Arcadia who joined the Resistance, she was named by Ciel, who considers her like a sister. Although not outright confirmed, it is strong implied that Prairie, the commander of the Guardians in the Mega Man ZX series, may be an older Alouette.

=== Weil ===
Dr. Weil is the main antagonist of the Mega Man Zero series. A brilliant but cruel scientist, he seeks total dominion over humans and Reploids alike, being the main engineer of Elf Wars and continuing to scheme ever since. Though perishing in Mega Man Zero 4, Weil's influence lingers in the Mega Man ZX series as his essence resides in the Biometal Model W, which fuels the major conflicts of the series.
