= Wily & Right no RockBoard: That's Paradise =

1993 business simulation video game published by Capcom

- Developer: Capcom
- Publisher: Capcom
- Designer: Yoshinori Takenaka
- Artist: Keiji Inafune
- Composer: Yuki Iwai
- Series: Mega Man
- Platform: Family Computer
- Release: JP: January 15, 1993
- Genre: Business simulation
- Modes: Single-player, multiplayer

Wily & Right no RockBoard: That's Paradise (ワイリー&ライトのロックボード ザッツ☆パラダイス) is a business simulator video game developed and published by Capcom for the Family Computer exclusively in Japan in 1993. It is a spin-off video game to the original Mega Man series. It is similar to the board game Monopoly, in which players and the computer AI take turns going around a set of connected circles, buying up property, and charging other participants rent when they land on those spaces.

Critical reception for the game from Western gaming websites has been generally negative. An English translation and a Game Boy version were both in development but never released.

== Gameplay ==
Wily & Right no RockBoard: That's Paradise is a business simulation game in which the player chooses among several characters in the original Mega Man series and competes with other players or the computer AI in purchasing spaces of property. The characters include Roll, Dr. Light, Dr. Wily, Dr. Cossack, and Kalinka. Each participant is given a turn, moving a certain number of spaces on the board. If they land on a property square, they are given the option to buy it with a certain about of Zenny (the game's currency). They can then charge other characters rent when they land on that building. However, other characters can also buy part of the same square, allowing each owner to charge a smaller amount of rent. Some squares contain cards that cause various effects on the board such as raising property prices or the development level of a building. The game's winning conditions can vary depending on the set rules. The winner may be the character with the most owned spaces, the most remaining Zenny, or the most developments.

== Development ==
Wily & Right no RockBoard: That's Paradise was developed by Capcom during a time when the Mega Man franchise was at its height of its popularity. Series artist Keiji Inafune had very little involvement in the development of Wily & Right no RockBoard: That's Paradise, simply designing the cover art and the new character Reggae. When developing the game, the team wanted to include as many bosses from previous titles in the series as possible. However, they ultimately decided to leave room for an original character that fans could associate with the new game. When discussing a bird character labeled fukō no tori (フコウノトリ; lit. "bird of misfortune"), one of the team members misread it as kōnotori (コウノトリ; lit. "Oriental stork"), resulting in Reggae's resemblance to the species.

The January 1993 issue of the Mexican magazine Club Nintendo featured Wily & Right no RockBoard as part of a preview article for the 1993 Consumer Electronics Show. Titling the game as "Mega Board", the article even had a screenshot featuring English text. An unreleased Game Boy version was also in the works by the Japanese company Dual, which listed the game on the credits page of its official website, and the ROM of which was recovered in the Nintendo Gigaleak. Hitoshi Sakimoto was responsible for the audio in this version.

== Reception ==
Reception

Review scores
Publication	Score
Famitsu	21/40
PlayStation Magazine (JP)	20.6/30

Critical reception for Wily & Right no RockBoard: That's Paradise outside Japan has been poor. GameSpot contributors Christian Nutt and Justin Speer found the relatively obscure game to be of no particular interest to anyone other than Mega Man fans. Jeremy Parish of 1UP.com summated, "An oddity of the Famicom era, this import title was a simple "Game of Life"-style board game with a Mega Man motif -- novel, but hardly essential." GamesRadar editor Brett Elston called it a "probably better-off-lost excursion into Mega-mediocrity." However, not all views of the game have been negative. JC Fletcher of Joystiq expressed desire for the game's release on the Wii's Virtual Console service. He opined that it is "actually nowhere near as terrible as a Mega Man board game should be" and that its various effects and winning conditions grant it a much faster pace than Monopoly.

== See also ==
- Itadaki Street
