= Mega Man Maverick Hunter X =

2005 video game

- North American box art
- Developer: Capcom
- Publisher: Capcom
- Director: Kazuki Matsue
- Producer: Tatsuya Kitabayashi
- Designers: Hiroyuki Yamato; Yuji Hayakawa; Yusuke Tokita; Gentaro Tanzawa
- Artist: Tatsuya Yoshikawa
- Writers: Makoto Ikehara; Yusuke Tokita
- Composers: Kento Hasegawa; Seiko Kobuchi; Shinya Okada
- Series: Mega Man X
- Platform: PlayStation Portable
- Release: JP: December 15, 2005; NA: January 31, 2006; EU: March 3, 2006
- Genre: Platform
- Mode: Single-player

Mega Man Maverick Hunter X (Note: Known in Japan as Irregular Hunter X (イレギュラーハンターX, Iregyurāhantā X)) is a 2005 platform game developed and published by Capcom for the PlayStation Portable (PSP). It is a remake of the 1993 video game Mega Man X, which was originally released for the Super NES and is the first game in the eponymous series. Players control an advanced, mechanical being called X through eight stages as he faces enemy forces and obtains new powers to defeat the strongest bosses. An alternative mode allows the player to control the villain Vile, who has his own weapons.

The story is similar to that of the original Mega Man X; the title character crosses the world to stop the rebellious Sigma from leading humanity to extinction and have the Mavericks rule the world. X's origins and his relationship with Sigma are further explored in the game and its original video animation (OVA) prequel The Day of Sigma. The new hardware allowed the staff to use voice acting with a cast. Mega Man Maverick Hunter X was first released in Japan on December 15, 2005, and in North America on January 31, 2006.

The game's development began with executive producer Keiji Inafune and his development team deciding whether they should make Mega Man X9 or a remake of Mega Man X for the PSP; they develop the latter because they wanted to take advantage of the new hardware. Because the game runs on newer hardware, it includes 3D graphics rather than the 2D graphics used in the 1993 original, other improvements and extra features.

Upon release, Mega Man Maverick Hunter X was met with positive reviews from critics, who praised its updated presentation and story, although the music was met with mixed reception. The game was a commercial failure, leading Capcom to cancel future remakes of Mega Man games, but the game has been retrospectively popular and is considered one of the best handheld games in the franchise.

== Gameplay ==
The player uses the villain Vile to battle enemies.

Mega Man Maverick Hunter X is a remake of Mega Man X, which was originally released in 1993 and uses 16-bit graphics. Mega Man Maverick Hunter X uses realistic 3D graphics. The player controls the Maverick Hunter X, whose only weapon is the "X Buster", which acts as horizontal firepower. Upon completing the introductory level, players can choose one of eight areas; they have to proceed while fighting enemies to reach and fight bosses known as mavericks. Beating a Maverick will unlock their ability to use as an alternate weapon besides the X Buster. Using certain abilities on Mavericks will cause them to take more damage than usual. Hidden in several levels are Dr. Light capsules, which include armor parts that give X additional buffs. In Mega Man Maverick Hunter X, the position and stages of these capsules are changed. X, the main character, has access to a hidden technique based on the fighting game series Street Fighter, the Hadoken, which allows X to easily defeat any enemy. When all eight mavericks are defeated, Sigma is unlocked as the final boss of the game. If the player did not obtain Light's arm protectors, his superior Zero gives X power-ups in the final stage.

After completing the game, an alternative mode in which the player controls the boss character Vile is unlocked. As a playable character, Vile has access to three weapons—one each for his arm, shoulder, and leg—and he acquires new weapon sets as he defeats each maverick boss, which must be equipped before each stage. He can use these three weapons an unlimited number of times but is limited to thase weapons throughout the stage. The bosses change, most notably in the finale where Vile faces X and Zero. Upon completing the game, an original video animation (OVA) called The Day of Sigma is unlocked, which explains the events that took place before X and Vile's stories.

== Plot ==
In a futuristic world, robots with free will called Reploids coexist with humans. However, several Reploids turn against humanity and cause chaos, resulting in them being labeled "mavericks". The Maverick Hunters are an organisation of Reploids who protect humanity from Mavericks. The Maverick Hunter commander, Sigma, eventually decides that humans are inhibiting Reploids' evolution and rallies many Hunters to rebel.

=== Playing as X ===
While defending a highway from a Maverick attack, rookie Maverick Hunter X is accosted by the ex-Hunter Vile. X is nearly killed in combat but his ally Zero saves his life. Zero departs to find Sigma's base, while X fights Sigma's followers. X also discovers capsules containing messages from his deceased creator, Dr. Thomas Light, who entrusts him with powers to fight for humanity.

After defeating all eight of Sigma's followers, X and Zero infiltrate Sigma's base, where Vile intercepts them. X and Zero are overpowered, but Zero uses the last of his strength to weaken Vile, enabling X to vanquish him. Zero beseeches X to complete their mission before dying. X then confronts Sigma, who criticizes X's sense of justice and claims to understand his true potential. X defeats Sigma and escapes his destroyed base. A final narration reveals that Dr. Light created X as a template for robots that could evolve. He sealed X away as he would not live long enough to guarantee X's safety, but expresses hope that X will fight for a future where both Reploids and humans can coexist.

=== Playing as Vile ===
Vile was a Maverick Hunter, until he was imprisoned for rogue behaviour. Sigma frees Vile after going Maverick, but Vile refuses to join his rebellion because Sigma sees more potential in X. Vile defeats eight of Sigma's followers to prove himself more worthy. Intrigued, Sigma invites Vile to his base to see his power in action. X and Zero, en route to confront Sigma, get into a fight with Vile. Although Vile defeats the pair, Zero distracts Vile long enough for X to vanquish him. Sigma approaches the dying Vile, asking what he was planning to do after defeating X. Vile admits he didn't know, but feels he validated his existence by defeating X.

=== The Day of Sigma ===
Prior to Sigma's rebellion, he leads a team of Maverick Hunters, including X, against a Maverick. X hesitates when the Maverick takes a hostage. Sigma defeats the Maverick, injuring the hostage in the process and chastising X for his indecision. Sigma later discusses X's sensitive nature with Dr. Cain, who believes it gives X the potential to grow, intriguing Sigma. Meanwhile, X and Zero grow suspicious about several Maverick incidents occurring at the same time. The pair discover Sigma to be the culprit and confront him. After incapacitating the pair, he destroys Abel City with a missile, killing Dr. Cain in the process. X then recalls how Dr. Light gave him the ability to grow and make his own decisions, trusting him to use his powers for justice. X fights back, scarring Sigma's face. Sigma then escapes to start his rebellion, leading to the game's beginning.

== Development and release ==
Capcom developed and published Mega Man Maverick Hunter X for the PlayStation Portable (PSP) handheld video game console; it was produced by Keiji Inafune, who was an artist and writer for the original game, and Tatsuya Kitabayashi. Mega Man Maverick Hunter X was conceptualized after Inafune discussed whether they should make Mega Man X9 or reboot the series with his development team; they decided to reboot the series because they wanted to take advantage of the PSP's new hardware. Although the remake follows the original game in both gameplay and storyline, it has new graphics and uses 3D character models and backgrounds, a remixed soundtrack, voice acting and anime cutscenes.

The character designs used in Mega Man Maverick Hunter X are based on those used for merchandising and Mega Man X8, which altered the designs to look more human. Tatsuya Yoshikawa, the game's main artist, enjoyed Mega Man X for its simple gameplay and storytelling, especially in the introduction. He had problems balancing X's limbs in illustrations and exaggerated Sigma's chin. He also prepared the concept art for each boss character, which were developed by the younger staff. The developers considered Vile's inclusion as a playable character one of the most-outstanding parts of the remake. Some designs were done with the idea of marketing toys. Vile was included as a playable character because Inafune felt having Zero as a playable character was "too obvious and boring". The Japanese version uses the track "Don't Wanna Be" by Spinwake as opening theme. Before the game's release, Capcom launched a promotion in Japan in which five winners received a script of the game that was signed by five of its voice actors.

Mega Man Maverick Hunter X was announced in November 2005; Capcom marketing director Todd Thorson said the game is influenced by Mega Man X and Mega Man, the first series of the franchise. He also said the developers aimed to innovate the classic formula and come up with new challenges for veterans of the series. Mega Man Maverick Hunter X was originally released in Japan on December 15, 2005; in North America on January 31, 2006; and in Europe on March 3, 2006. The Japanese and North American versions were bundled in a compilation with Mega Man: Powered Up, a remake of the original Mega Man.

== Reception ==
Reception

Aggregate score
Aggregator	Score
Metacritic	79/100

Review scores
Publication	Score
1Up.com	7/10
Famitsu	27/40
GameRevolution	B
GameSpot	8.1/10
GameSpy	4.5/5
IGN	8/10
PALGN	7.5/10

Maverick Hunter X received "generally favorable reviews" according to review aggregator Metacritic, averaging 79/100. The gameplay was generally praised; Juan Castro of IGN stated that it would appeal to new gamers and fans of the original, calling it "intense, fun, and very challenging". Phil Theobald of GameSpy praised the large game content and game design, saying the formula of the original series still works properly, but found it too short and familiar for a remake. Jeremy Parish of 1UP.com said the visuals were similar to content in Mega Man X8 and live up to the popularity of Mega Man X, expanding on the story without recycling material because Vile's mode relies on new enemies and weapons. Matt Keller of PALGN praised the design of the bosses and tactics as well as explained lore. He found the main game to be short but noted the extra content, saying Vile stands out for new weapons the player has and his unique story. Alex Navarro of GameSpot found the remake faithful enough to the original game enough to appeal to players but noted some upgrades for the main characters were moved to trick them and make the experience unique; he also called Vile's sidestory and Sigma's backstory the most-surprising new materials.

Critics had mixed feelings about the narrative. Castro praised the animated cutscenes for adding "extra story and character depth" with good production values, but had mixed feelings about the quality of the English voice acting. Joe Dodson of GameRevolution initially praised the setting and story for resembling the film Blade Runner (1982) but criticized the voice acting and localization, saying these might ruin the appeal of the concept. Parish said Mark Gatha's performance in Mega Man Maverick Hunter X sounds "frothingly pissed-off all the time and feels the need to shout the name of his special weapons every single time he uses them". Navarro compared the production values with those of PlayStation 2 games in the series, especially the cutscenes, and found the voice acting not as impressive as the game visuals. Keller praised the animated cutscenes and OVA as good bonus material, and compared the voice acting to that of localized anime series.

Despite the positive reviews, Mega Man Maverick Hunter X was a commercial failure. Inafune had planned to make future remakes of Mega Man games but poor sales of both Mega Man Maverick Hunter X and Mega Man Powered Up shelved future remakes permanently. Mega Man Maverick Hunter X became more successful following its inclusion on the PlayStation Store; in April 2014, it was the tenth-best selling game on the PlayStation Network.

In 2011, Capcom announced Mega Man Powered Up and Mega Man Maverick Hunter X would be included in a double pack. In 2018, The Day of Σ was included in the video game compilations Mega Man X Legacy Collection 1 and 2; the full anime was included and remastered in high-definition video but the game was not included, making it and Mega Man X: Command Mission the only 3D entries not included. Ollie Reynolds of Nintendo Life listed Mega Man Maverick Hunter X as a game he would like on the Nintendo Switch alongside Mega Man Powered Up.

In retrospect, IGN ranked Mega Man Maverick Hunter X as the nineteenth-best PSP game ever made. Joe Juba of Game Informer regarded the game as one of the best to play on a handheld console due to the impressive new visuals and the innovative inclusion of Vile as playable character. Mike Spletchta of Game Zone found the remake as enjoyable as the original and suggested gamers try it on the PlayStation TV. Retronauts praised the game's faithfulness to the original, and found the inclusion of Vile "strange" and "interesting". The site also praised the narrative, which is expanded through lore-extending cutscenes.
