= Mega Man: Battle & Chase =

1997 racing video game published by Capcom and Infogrames

- European box art
- Developer: Capcom
- Publisher: Capcom: EU: Infogrames
- Producer: Keiji Inafune
- Designers: Masahiro Yasuma; Hayato Tsuru
- Programmers: Shinya Ikuta; Soichi Ito; Masaki Kataoka; Katsunori Oida
- Composer: Yoshinori Ono
- Series: Mega Man
- Platform: PlayStation
- Release: JP: March 20, 1997; PAL: April 3, 1998; PlayStation Network: JP: December 17, 2014
- Genre: Racing
- Modes: Single-player, multiplayer

Mega Man: Battle & Chase (Note: Japanese: ロックマン バトル&チェイス, Hepburn: Rokkuman Battoru Ando Cheisu; lit. 'Rockman: Battle & Chase') is a racing video game based on the original Mega Man series from Capcom. The game was released in Japan on March 20, 1997 and in the PAL region on April 3, 1998 for PlayStation. Although it was not released individually in North America, Mega Man: Battle & Chase was featured on the region-exclusive Mega Man X Collection in 2006. Mega Man: Battle & Chase is a traditional racing game with an emphasis on combat. Winning a race allows the player to choose a car part from an enemy competitor as a prize. The story of the game is centered around the Battle & Chase racing show, with a prize of 10 million zenny for the winner. After a thunderstorm broke Dr. Light's computer, Mega Man decides to join the tournament to win the prize money and use it to fix his creator's computer. Reviews for the game have been mixed with many critics drawing comparisons to Nintendo's Mario Kart series.

== Gameplay ==
Mega Man competes against Roll in the single-player Grand Prix mode.

Mega Man: Battle & Chase is a 3D racing game in which the players compete against one another or the computer AI in a series of road races. The game consists of three different modes: a single-player "Grand Prix Mode", a "Time Trial Mode", and a multiplayer "Versus Mode". The Grand Prix mode contains a total of eight race tracks, while the Time Trial mode contains twelve tracks. The game has twelve playable characters from the original Mega Man series including Mega Man, Roll, Proto Man, Bass, Duo, and Dr. Wily, as well as the Robot Masters Guts Man, Ice Man, Quick Man, Shadow Man, Napalm Man, and Spring Man. Each of the characters possesses an innate ability that can be used for attacking other drivers during the race. A gauge on the left side of the screen will repeatedly charge and allow for another special power when fired. For example, Mega Man has the ability to shoot small projectiles from his vehicle. When the weapon gauge completely fills, the player can unleash a much larger and more destructive blast.

All the race tracks are littered with hazards and other obstacles that range from street cones to giant, walking Mets. Rather than avoiding them, players are encouraged to make contact with them. Running through or destroying ten of these hazards with a weapon will give the player a special item. These items have various effects such as giving the player a shield or disabling other drivers' weapons. Winning races in the game's Grand Prix mode lets the player select a specific part (engine, wing, tire, or body) from the owner of the track, allowing for the customization of both the performance and appearance of the chosen character's vehicle.

== Development ==
Series artist and producer Keiji Inafune claimed that he had always wanted to "[bring] the unique 'beat your enemies and take their stuff aspect' of Mega Man to a racing cart game". The game's character designs and promotion images were illustrated by Shinsuke Komaki and Hideki Ishikawa. The concept art for Guts Man in his Wild Arms racer was redone for the overseas version due to the original piece containing the character performing an offensive gesture. The musical score for Mega Man: Battle & Chase was composed by Yoshinori Ono and has vocals by Yoshino Aoki and Ryoji Yamamoto. This was one of Aoki's first projects at Capcom. She sang theme for the character Roll, Kaze yo Tsutaete (風よ伝えて; "Wind, Carry My Words"), which was used as both an ending theme and for the game's Japanese television commercial advertisement. The second vocal ending theme A ~ Otoko Ichidai (あ~男一代; lit. "Ah, Man's Life") features Yamamoto as the character Guts Man. A CD soundtrack for the game was released by Victor Entertainment in Japan on June 21, 1997.

Mega Man: Battle & Chase was released in Japan on March 20, 1997. The developer Capcom had planned to release the game in North America the following month. However, despite being advertised in numerous gaming magazines, Mega Man Battle & Chase did not pass approval from Sony Computer Entertainment for an individual release in North America due to an already large presence of mascot-themed racing games in the video game market. In April 1998, Infogrames published an English version of the game. It was one of the few PAL region Capcom titles released at this time that wasn't published by Virgin Interactive Entertainment. In 2006, Mega Man Battle & Chase was included along with the first six Mega Man X games in the North American Mega Man X Collection for the PlayStation 2 (PS2) and GameCube.

== Reception ==
Reception

Review scores
| Publication | Score |
|---|---|
| Famitsu | 26 out of 40 |
| GameSpot | 7.3 out of 10 |
| Dengeki PlayStation | 50/100, 75/100 |
| Man!ac | 65/100 |
| Super GamePower | 4/5. |

Critical reception for Mega Man: Battle & Chase has been mixed. The gameplay has been almost universally compared to Nintendo's Mario Kart series. GameSpot contributor Jeff Gerstmann was impressed by the Japanese version of the game. Gerstmann noted good graphics and interesting sound design, and concluded that it is "one of the coolest Mega Man games released. Period." Oliver Ehrl of Maniac was positive about the game, stating that while it was boring at lower levels of difficulty due to being targeted at children, it does get more interesting. He also pointed out that the game contains graphical errors on steep curves which include stuttering models.

When reviewing the Mega Man X Collection, Phil Theobald of GameSpy found the graphics for Mega Man Battle & Chase to be dated, but that it was still fun to play and that the ability of the player to steal opponents' parts to use as their own further tied the game to Mega Man franchise. IGN writer Jeremy Dunham similarly asserted, "I was actually surprised at how entertaining this little kart racer really is, and while it's not on par with something like Crash Team Racing or the legendary Mario Kart series, it's a nice change of pace with some cool tracks." In his retrospective of the entire Mega Man game franchise, Jeremy Parrish of 1UP.com denoted the Mega Man Battle & Chase as "a simpleminded racer that is mainly notable for being the first truly shameless Mario Kart clone and for almost being released in the U.S. Though not worth a stand-alone purchase, it's tolerable as a few minutes' diversion as part of the Mega Man X Collection for PS2."
