= Mega Man X6 =

2001 video game

- North American PlayStation cover art featuring X in the foreground and Zero in the background
- Developer: Capcom
- Publisher: Capcom
- Director: Koji Okohara
- Producer: Tatsuya Minami
- Designers: Akiteru Naka; Toyozumi Sakai
- Artist: Haruki Suetsugu
- Composer: Naoto Tanaka
- Series: Mega Man X
- Platform: PlayStation
- Release: JP: November 29, 2001; NA: December 11, 2001; EU: February 8, 2002
- Genres: Action, platform
- Mode: Single-player

Mega Man X6 (Note: Known in Japan as Rockman X6 (ロックマンX6, Rokkuman Ekkusushikkusu)) is a 2001 action-platform game developed and published by Capcom. The sixth main entry in the Mega Man X series, it was first released on the PlayStation in Japan on November 29, 2001, and was later made available in both North America and Europe.

The plot of Mega Man X6 takes place during the 22nd century, where humans live alongside fully sentient robots called "Reploids". The game follows shortly after the events of Mega Man X5, in which the Reploid Zero sacrifices himself to help save planet Earth from a global catastrophe caused by series antagonist Sigma. As the world recovers, an entity known as the "Zero Nightmare" has begun spreading chaos, prompting series protagonist X to investigate. Like past games in the series, players may tackle a series of platforming stages in any order, defeating enemies via precision shooting and gaining the unique weapon of each stage's boss after completing a stage. Unique to this game, X can also use Zero's Z-Saber sword for additional close-quarters combat. Zero can be unlocked as an additional playable character by completing hidden, optional stages, retaining his sword-based gameplay from previous games.

Prominent series artist and producer Keiji Inafune was not involved in the game's production, as he had intended the fifth installment in the series to be the last. Critically, Mega Man X6 has received mixed reviews for its recycled narrative and high difficulty derived from poor level design and is frequently regarded by fans as among the worst games in the franchise. It was also re-released in 2006 as part of the North American Mega Man X Collection for the GameCube and PlayStation 2, and as part of the Mega Man X Legacy Collection 2 in 2018 for additional consoles.

== Gameplay ==
X rescues a Reploid from the Nightmare virus.

Mega Man X6 plays similar to its predecessor, Mega Man X5. As an action platformer, the game follows the series formula of choosing between eight stages in any order, each culminating in a battle with a boss character whose defeat adds a new unique weapon to X's arsenal, followed by a fixed series of stages that lead to the final boss. Players initially play as series protagonist X, who is skilled at shooting with his X Buster and can now wield the Z-Saber in close-quarters combat. Like in previous games, players can find and equip armors for X that give him additional abilities, beginning the game with his Falcon Armor from Mega Man X5, with the new Shadow Armor and Blade Armor being hidden in pieces throughout the main eight stages. Zero can be unlocked after finding and defeating the boss Zero Nightmare, and he plays with a unique set of abilities, including a more refined Z-Saber fighting style and a double jump.

A unique feature of Mega Man X6 is its "Nightmare Phenomenon" system, which, after leaving a stage for any reason, causes additional effects or obstacles called "Nightmare Effects" to be added to other stages, such as small invincible enemies or gusts of wind. Stages that have a new active Nightmare Effect are highlighted in red on the stage selection screen. Every stage has a predetermined group of Nightmare Effects that can be added to them, and only the most recent Nightmare Effect for a stage will be active at a time.

Mega Man X6 has an increased emphasis on rescuing Reploids over previous titles in the series. Whereas previous games rewarded players for rescues with health or an extra life, Mega Man X6 rewards players with additional parts or other permanent upgrades. Rescuing Reploids was made more difficult in this game with the addition of the Nightmare Virus, an enemy that turns peaceful Reploids into dangerous "Mavericks" when it touches them, thus rendering the Reploid impossible to save. Certain Reploids grant power-up items called "parts", a feature returning from Mega Man X5. Rather than parts being equipped to X's armor, parts are now attached to the characters themselves. The number of parts that can be equipped at once is dependent on the player's rank, which is increased by collecting "Nightmare Souls", small items that drop from defeated Nightmare Virus enemies.

== Plot ==
In the 22nd century, humans live alongside human-like robots called "Reploids". Following the Eurasia space colony incident, which nearly destroyed planet Earth, the Maverick Hunter Zero remains missing in action and presumed dead, with his partner X remaining as the world's best Maverick Hunter. As a result of the space colony's impact, Earth's surface has been rendered largely uninhabitable, forcing the human population to take refuge underground. An intelligent Reploid researcher named Gate, researching the impact site, discovers an unusual piece of wreckage. A week later, Gate loses his sanity as he secretly experiments on the mysterious item and declares his intention to turn Earth into a utopia for high-class Reploids.

Maverick Hunter operator Alia sends X to the crash site to investigate the disturbance. During his mission, he briefly encounters a ghostly being reminiscent of Zero. X then meets a Reploid scientist named Isoc and his nigh-invulnerable subordinate, High Max. They are in search of the Zero-like being, dubbed the Zero Nightmare, which is spreading a dangerous "Nightmare Virus" that causes Reploids to falsely perceive reality to the point of harming themselves and others, turning them into rebellious "Mavericks". Isoc invites all Reploids to join his cause to destroy the Nightmare Virus and dispatches eight Reploid "Nightmare Investigators" to investigate areas with high Nightmare Virus activity. X follows the Investigators to the suspected areas himself and fights them as they each become infected. After each is defeated, Alia gradually reveals her history as a previous colleague of Gate's; Gate had built the Investigators during their tenure together, but a group of jealous rivals murdered each of them in a series of staged accidents.

Optionally, X can also encounter the Zero Nightmare and defeat it. Following this, the real Zero appears, unaware of how he survived his battle against Sigma. Nonetheless, he reunites with X and rejoins the Maverick Hunters to continue investigating the Nightmare Virus. After this, X and Zero can find and encounter High Max, defeating him in battle.

Following the defeat of the eight Investigators or High Max, X and Zero are contacted by Gate. Gate reveals that the item he found at the crash site was a piece of Zero's DNA. The DNA drove Gate insane, and he used it to create the Zero Nightmare, the Nightmare Virus, and High Max to help build his utopia. The Hunters go to Gate's laboratory to put a stop to his plans. Following Gate's defeat, he confesses he has been rebuilding Sigma, the Maverick who instigated the Eurasia incident. Isoc loses his consciousness permanently before trying to tell Zero something.

Sigma awakens in an incomplete state, incapacitates Gate, and attacks. If X defeats Sigma and previously defeated the Zero Nightmare, Zero is alongside X as he rescues Gate so that Alia can try and revive him if she chooses to do so. If X defeats Sigma but did not defeat the Zero Nightmare, Alia is instead with X at the end and thanks him for rescuing Gate. Zero is then shown to be alive, but leaves the fighting to X. If Zero defeats Sigma, an unknown scientist seals Zero away for research for the next 102 years, as Zero is worried about the potential of his DNA and believes X can protect the peace in his absence.

== Development ==
The eight Nightmare bosses and the villain Gate (middle) were all designed by Haruki Suetsugu.

Series producer Keiji Inafune was not involved in the development of Mega Man X6. He had originally intended for the fifth chapter in the series to be the last due to the death of Zero at that game's conclusion. "And so I'd always planned to make Zero come back to life in the Mega Man Zero series, but then X6 comes out sooner from another division and Zero comes back to life in that, and I'm like, 'What's this!? Now my story for Zero doesn't make sense! Zero's been brought back to life two times!'" Inafune also felt he owed fans of the series an apology for the decision to create Mega Man X6, although the series was "starting to go in a direction out of [his] control" at that point.

Artist Haruki Suetsugu, who had worked on both previous PlayStation Mega Man X games, signed on as the game's primary character designer and promotional artwork illustrator. Suetsugu stated that the development schedule for Mega Man X6 was tight. Gate was one of Suetsugu's favorite designs, to the point that he was disappointed when he was not included in the next games. As such, he described his designs for the Maverick bosses as "relatively simple", and he took a similar approach to designing all of them: for instance, all of the Mavericks have the characteristic head fins and forehead jewel found on their creator Gate's helmet. The designs for other characters also feature unique traits, including Gate as a "merging of scientists and combatants, High Max as "big and strong", and the DNA-like Nightmare. Due to the events of Mega Man X5, Sigma was specifically designed to be a "mess". X's two armors were given different purposes, with Shadow highlighting a more stealthy approach to combat and Blade having the look of multiple weapons.

The game was released on November 29, 2001, in Japan, on December 11, 2001, in North America, and on February 8, 2002, in Europe. The background music for Mega Man X6 was composed by Naoto Tanaka. The game also features the opening vocal songs "Moon Light" and "The Answer" by Showtaro Morikubo, the latter being used as the Japanese commercial song for Mega Man Xtreme 2, the ending theme "I.D.E.A." by RoST. All of the game's instrumental and vocal music was compiled on the Capcom Music Generation: Rockman X1 ~ X6 soundtrack released by Suleputer in 2003. The game was not dubbed in any language other than the original Japanese, and the North American and European versions retained the Japanese voice tracks, using translated English subtitles to tell the story, besides the opening movie. The voice tracks for the cutscenes were removed completely when Mega Man X6 was re-released as a part of Mega Man X Collection for the PlayStation 2 and GameCube in North America in 2006, though the in-game voice tracks are still retained. It became available for Windows via Steam, PlayStation 4, Xbox One, and Nintendo Switch as a part of Mega Man X Legacy Collection 2 on July 24, 2018, worldwide and on July 26, 2018, in Japan.

== Reception ==
Reception

Aggregate score
Aggregator	Score
Metacritic	65/100

Review scores
Publication	Score
Electronic Gaming Monthly	3.5/10
Famitsu	28/40
Game Informer	6.5/10
GameRevolution	C−
GameSpot	7/10
GameZone	8.5/10
IGN	8/10
Official U.S. PlayStation Magazine	6/10

According to the Japanese magazine Famitsu, Mega Man X6 was the seventh-best-selling game in Japan during its week of release, with 39,318 units sold. Dengeki Online reported that Mega Man X6 sold a total of 106,980 units in Japan by the end of 2001, marking it as the 109th-best-selling game of the year in the region. The game eventually saw a re-release as part of the PlayStation the Best range of budget titles.

Mega Man X6 received mixed reviews, with an average score of 65 on Metacritic. It has often been criticized for its harsh difficulty, stemming from poor design of its stages and mechanics, as well as its recycled narrative. Giancarlo Varanini of GameSpot was disappointed by the execution of the Nightmare System and item collection, which added variety and longevity but were not important to completing the game. He praised the game's music, but commented that the visuals were not at the standard set by older games in the series. He concluded that the gameplay made the game suitable only for "hard-core Mega Man fans." IGN found the formula repetitive but still enjoyable, while also praising the soundtrack and replay value. Similarly, GameZone was positive about the game, claiming that while there was little to no innovation to the formula other than X's new sword, the concept was well executed. Gaming Age praised the production values for producing aesthetically pleasing stages and cutscenes retaining good audio.

Among the most negative reviews, Electronic Gaming Monthly gave the game a 3.5 out of 10, lamenting the poor quality the game left on the Mega Man X series. GameRevolution said the plot was recycled from previous games, citing Gate's backstory and Zero's return from the dead, and felt the difficulty was higher than previous installments. They also cited the boss designs as lacking the appeal to make the player care to fight them. Gaming Age found the game challenging to beyond a point where players would care to properly finish. Despite mixed feelings about the voice acting and storytelling, GameZone found that the audio and theme songs were well done.

In retrospect, 1UP.com referred to Mega Man X6 as "sloppy", citing multiple issues within its design, such as repetitive stages and background images. Despite panning the narrative for recycling events from the franchise, Zoey Handley of Destructoid felt that the gameplay was the same as the older games though she also highlighted the poorly implemented Reploid Rescue system, which effectively forced the player to save them all in order to progress through most of the most challenging stages. This led her to call Mega Man X6 the worst game of the franchise. Capcom producer Tatsuya Kitabayashi acknowledged the negative response Mega Man X6 received. Their reaction was that the players would like "a better, a newer, a fresher Mega Man X game" and thus came up with the sequel having a transition to 3D graphics. He further added, "Not so much trying to correct mistakes from the past or dodge problems that occurred with X6, but more working on getting 3D right." This led to the development of Mega Man X7 as a 3D game.
