= Mega Man X2 =

1994 video game

- North American cover art
- Developer: Capcom
- Publishers: JP/NA: Capcom; EU: Laguna Video Games
- Producer: Tokuro Fujiwara
- Designers: Keiji Inafune; Sho Tsuge; Yoshihisa Tsuda
- Artists: Keiji Inafune; Hayato Kaji; Kazunori Tazaki
- Composer: Yuki Iwai
- Series: Mega Man X
- Platforms: Super NES, mobile phone
- Release: Super NES: JP: December 16, 1994; NA: January 1995; PAL: November 18, 1995; Mobile i-mode: JP: December 1, 2008; EZweb: JP: May 13, 2009
- Genre: Platform
- Mode: Single-player

Mega Man X2 (Note: Stylized as MEGA MAN X²) (Note: Known in Japan as Rockman X2 (ロックマンX2, Rokkuman Ekkusutsū)) is a 1994 platform game developed and published by Capcom for the Super Nintendo Entertainment System (SNES). The game was released in Japan on December 16, 1994, and in North America and PAL regions in 1995. It is the direct sequel to Mega Man X, released one year prior. Mega Man X2 takes place in the near future in which humans try to peacefully coexist with intelligent robots called "Reploids", with some of the Reploids going "Maverick" and threatening daily life. The plot follows the android protagonist X, a "Maverick Hunter" who saved humanity from the evil Sigma six months earlier. A trio of Mavericks calling themselves the "X-Hunters" has arisen, intent on destroying X by luring him with body parts of his comrade Zero, who died in the conflict with Sigma's right-hand robot Vile.

Mega Man X2 features much of the same elements as the first installment of the series, following the traditional gameplay of the original Mega Man series. The player is tasked with completing a series of stages by destroying enemies, gaining various power-ups, and winning the special weapon of each stage's boss. Like the first Mega Man X, this game lets the player dash, scale walls, and obtain access to special abilities via optional pieces of armor. Mega Man X2 is graphically similar to its predecessor as well, but Capcom included the Cx4 in-cartridge enhancement chip to allow for some 3D wireframe effects. The development team was instructed to utilize this technology as much as possible when working on the game.

The presentation and gameplay of Mega Man X2 have earned the game a mostly positive critical reception. However, reviewers were dismayed by the lack of changes from the original Mega Man X. The game has since been released on various other platforms.

== Plot ==
Mega Man X2 is set in an ambiguous year during the 22nd century ("21XX") in which the world is populated both by humans and mechanical beings known as "Reploids" (replicant androids). The mass-produced Reploids are based on a complex, humanoid robot dubbed X who was discovered by the archaeologist Dr. Cain in laboratory ruins many months earlier. Created with human-level intelligence and free will, some Reploids have a tendency towards destructive, criminal activity and are subsequently dubbed "Mavericks" by the government. A military force called the "Maverick Hunters" is formed to halt or prevent such activity. The events of the first Mega Man X game entail the hunter X's fight to stop Sigma, a Maverick overlord bent on the conquest of Earth and the genocide of humanity. X succeeds in his mission to foil Sigma's plans, but at the cost of his partner Zero's life.

Six months following the incident, X becomes the head of the Maverick Hunters. X tracks a "manufactured Maverick" bearing Sigma's emblem to a Reploid factory, where he launches a full assault. However, despite Sigma's apparent death and X's recent efforts, the Maverick rebellion continues. Three powerful Mavericks—Serges, Agile, and Violen—form a group called the "X-Hunters" and gain control of the North Pole. In the time between Sigma's demise and the trio's sudden uprising, Serges has collected the deceased Zero's bodyparts. After the factory mission, X is assigned to seek and exterminate eight Maverick leaders on a large continent directly south of the North Pole. The X-Hunters contact the Maverick Hunters shortly thereafter and taunt them with Zero's body. The X-Hunters drift among the eight Maverick locations and attempt to lure X out, each one promising the protagonist a piece of Zero if he can defeat them.

The story deviates slightly depending on whether or not the player collects all three of Zero's parts before heading to the X-Hunter fortification in the North Pole. If the player gathers all the parts, Dr. Cain states he will attempt to reassemble and reactivate Zero using his original control chip. If the player does not succeed, X is informed by Dr. Cain that the X-Hunters have attacked Maverick Hunter headquarters and stolen any collected parts and the control chip. Just as X annihilates the last of the X-Hunters, Sigma reveals himself to have been behind the plot. X leaves the exploding compound and tracks Sigma to the Central Computer, one of the eight locations he visited earlier. If the player fails to collect all of Zero's parts, X finds both Sigma and the newly rebuilt Zero waiting for him halfway through the stage. X must then beat Zero in combat. If the player does manage to collect all of the parts, a gray-armored clone of Zero accompanies Sigma instead; the real Zero then appears at X's side and destroys the clone. The outcome of either event has Sigma retreating and Zero creating a passageway in the floor to allow X pursuit. After X defeats Sigma, he reveals to X that his true form exists as a computer virus, and taunts to X that he will return. However, Sigma questions Zero's allegiance with humans, stating that Zero is "the last of the Doctor's creations". X evacuates the facility to rendezvous with Zero outside, and the two watch as the facility self-destructs.

== Gameplay ==
The player obtains the hidden X-Buster upgrade in Wheel Gator's stage.

Mega Man X2 is an action-platform game in the same fashion as the first Mega Man X and the original Mega Man series. The player takes on the role of the titular character X, who must traverse and clear a series of eight, side-scrolling stages in the order of the player's choosing. The protagonist's initial abilities include running, jumping, scaling walls, dashing forward to make longer jumps, and firing his chargeable "X-Buster" arm cannon. Unlike Mega Man X, the dash is a permanent ability at the start of the game, instead of being an armor upgrade found in a capsule. The player must contend with countless robotic enemies and several platforming hazards such as bottomless pits, deadly spikes, and rising lava. Along the way, the player can pick up extra lives and items that restore health and weapon power. Each stage contains one main boss at the end; defeating the stage's boss will earn the player a special weapon that can be quickly switched to and used in any remaining levels. Every boss is weak to another's weapon, so the player may strategize the order in which the stages are completed.

Mega Man X2 features a number of extra gameplay elements. At certain times, the player can pilot vehicles including an attack mech in Wheel Gator's stage and an attack hovercycle in Overdrive Ostrich's stage. Each of the eight stages contains an optional entrance for a battle with one of the three X-Hunters, should the player select that stage when one of them is present. Defeating an X-Hunter will earn the player a piece of Zero, which may affect the storyline late in the game. Like the first Mega Man X, players can locate and acquire numerous hidden power-ups. "Heart Tanks" extend the player's maximum life bar, "Sub-Tanks" store life energy for later use, and armor upgrade capsules grant a set of new abilities. For example, the leg part will allow the player to perform a dash in mid-air, while the X-Buster part will allow for two charged blasts in succession. When specific conditions are met a special capsule is unlocked in one of the game's final stages, allowing X to perform an attack similar to the Shoryuken used by characters from Capcom's Street Fighter series.

== Development ==
Mega Man X2 was developed by a team at Capcom, which included artists Hayato Kaji and Keiji Inafune, as well as designers Sho Tsuge, and Yoshihisa Tsuda. A majority of the people who worked on Mega Man X2 had either been heavily involved with the development of the first Mega Man X or were completely new to the franchise. Inafune was "hands-off" with the art design in Mega Man X2. He instead began focusing more on planning, producing, and story writing for the newer series beginning with this title. According to Tsuda, it was Inafune's decision to bring Zero back to life in Mega Man X2 simply because he thought it would be "a shame" to keep him dead. Inafune felt particularly attached to Zero, a character whom he had designed and originally intended to be the main protagonist of the X series. Even though Inafune had mostly relinquished his character design duties in Mega Man X2, he refused to allow any drastic changes to the illustration of Zero.

The game's antagonists, the X-Hunters, were present as several illustrations within Inafune's sketchbook prior to the completion of the first Mega Man X. Their aesthetic features were combined to create the basis for Sigma's design in Mega Man X; the three designs were then fleshed out as three separate characters for the sequel. The team had planned to include a fourth, female X-Hunter and were going to denote them as the "Four Guardians". However, both this character and Violen's second form were cut from the final version of the game due to a lack of resources. In creating the eight, ancillary Maverick bosses, the development team considered holding public, fan submissions as they had done with several games in the original Mega Man series. They ultimately decided against the idea as they wanted to further establish a contrast between the two series. Tsuge elaborated, "With Mega Man, we wanted the players to feel a certain familiarity with the characters, but it was our intention that the X series would have a world with a more hardcore feel to it. We didn't want the bosses in this world to be cute products of kids' imaginations, we needed them to be solid characters refined by professionals."

Mega Man X2 has an in-cartridge enhancement by Capcom called the Cx4 chip, a digital signal processor which allows for limited 3D graphical effects like rotation, enlarging, and shrinking of wireframe objects. The company held weekly meetings devoted to utilizing the chip to its maximum potential in Mega Man X2. Tsuge commented that the Cx4 was their "greatest adversary to date" as they were instructed to use it in as many ways as possible. The musical score for Mega Man X2 was chiefly composed by Yuki Iwai. Others, such as Ippo Yamada, were involved in some of the game's sound production. Tsuge wanted the Flame Stag stage theme cut from the game, but the song was kept due to its popularity among the development staff. Additionally, the game's ending theme was originally its final boss track. As the team felt it was more appropriate for the ending music, it was slightly altered and made as such. The Mega Man X2 soundtrack, featuring the original SNES instrumentals, was included as part of the Capcom Music Generation: Rockman X1 ~ X6 compilation released by Suleputer in 2003.

== Release ==
The game was released in Japan on December 16, 1994, and in North America and PAL regions in 1995. Mega Man X2 was included in the Mega Man X Collection for the GameCube and PlayStation 2 in North America in 2006. The game was also released on Japanese mobile phones in 2008 and 2009 and worldwide on the Virtual Console in 2011 and 2012 for the Wii and in 2013–2014 for the Wii U.

In 2006, Mega Man X2 was included as part of the North American Mega Man X Collection for GameCube and PlayStation 2. A version for i-mode and EZweb-compatible mobile phones was made available in Japan between 2008 and 2009. Mega Man X2 was released on the Wii Virtual Console service in Japan on December 27, 2011, in PAL regions on May 31, 2012, and in North America on June 14, 2012. It was ported to Microsoft Windows, PlayStation 4, Xbox One, and Nintendo Switch as part of Mega Man X Legacy Collection (Rockman X Anniversary Collection in Japan) which was released on July 24, 2018, worldwide and July 26, 2018, in Japan.

== Reception ==
Reception

Aggregate score
Aggregator	Score
GameRankings	82% (SNES)

Review scores
Publication	Score
Electronic Gaming Monthly	7.6/10
Famitsu	8/10, 7/10, 6/10, 8/10
Game Informer	7.75/10
Game Players	81/100
GameFan	86/100
GamePro	5/5
M! Games	76/100
Next Generation	4/5
Nintendo Power	3.43/5
Super Play	80/100
VideoGames & Computer Entertainment	8/10

Reception for Mega Man X2 has been primarily positive by virtue of its graphics, sound, and a persistently enjoyable gameplay model which critics and fans of the Mega Man series had come to expect. Comparing the game to the first Mega Man X, GamePro's Chris Nicolella called Mega Man X2 "improved in almost every way". Nicolella summarized, "The new C4 chip energizes the already great graphics, the extremely responsive controls are perfect and the levels contain more enemies and hidden locations than any MM cart yet." Dave Halverson of GameFan likewise enjoyed the level designs and judged the new armor abilities and the music to be better than the original Mega Man X. GameSpot editors Christian Nutt and Justin Speer were appreciative of Capcom's attempt at expanding Mega Man X2 over its predecessor in all aspects, especially the story, which they called "involving ... with engaging characters". Not as enthusiastically, staff from Game Informer and Next Generation reviewed the entry positively, but felt major revamps were needed in order to keep the series interesting; Rick considered it just "good enough" to play a third game in the Mega Man X series.

The game has made it to several lists of best games for the Super NES. IGN named Mega Man X2 as the 31st-best game in its list of the top 100 SNES games of all time. "Following up the explosive debut of the Mega Man X series was no small task," the website abstracted, "but Mega Man X2 accomplished the job admirably." In 2018, Complex listed the game 57th on their "The Best Super Nintendo Games of All Time." They commented that Mega Man X2 is a great follow up to the original, although there is not much change compared to its predecessor yet the gameplay is great.
