= Mega Man X =

- English logo used since Mega Man X7
- Genres: Action, Platform, role-playing, Run 'n gun
- Developers: Capcom; Minakuchi Engineering
- Publisher: Capcom
- Platforms: Super NES; Windows; MS-DOS; PlayStation; Saturn; Game Boy Color; GameCube; PlayStation 2; PlayStation Portable; Mobile phone; PlayStation 4; Xbox One; Nintendo Switch
- First release: Mega Man X 17 December 1993
- Latest release: Mega Man X DiVE Offline; 1 September 2023
- Parent series: Mega Man

Mega Man X (Note: Japanese: ロックマンX, Hepburn: Rokkuman Ekkusu; lit. 'Rockman X') is a series of action-platform games released by Capcom. It is a sub-series of the Mega Man franchise previously developed by the same group, with Keiji Inafune acting as one of the main staff members. The first game was released on 17 December 1993 in Japan on the Super Famicom and the following month on the Super NES in North America. Most of the sequels were ported to Microsoft Windows. The gameplay introduces new elements to the Mega Man franchise in the form of Mega Man's successor X, including his new skills and power-ups in the form of armors while retaining the ability to decide which boss to fight first. The franchise is also known for its replay value, in which certain choices and optional content can influence both gameplay and storylines, allowing the player to experience alternate scenarios.

Set 100 years after the original games, the story follows X, the last creation of Dr. Light whose free-willed programming and intelligence allows for countless other free-willed androids called reploids to be produced. When these reploids begin to go "Maverick" and start to rebel against their human counterparts under the command of Sigma, X decides to make up for his creations by joining the Hunters. Throughout the series, he is partnered by his superior Zero, who becomes a playable character from Mega Man X3 onwards. A third character named Axl, joins the group from Mega Man X7 onwards. For the remake Mega Man Maverick Hunter X, the antagonist Vile debuted as a playable character. While at first Zero possess the same skills as X, he becomes a swordsman in Mega Man X4.

The video games have also inspired several spin-offs that deal with other villains while several manga adaptations have been produced. Critical reception to the Mega Man X series was generally positive for its faster-paced action in comparison to the original series, but the continuous release of installments led to criticism about Mega Man X lacking innovations. A sequel series titled Mega Man Zero followed, and focused on its titular character while several crossovers involving X and other characters from the series have been produced.

== Plot ==
Recurring characters featuring: X (foreground), Vile (left), Zero (right) and Sigma (background)

The plot focuses on "X", a mechanical being created by Dr. Thomas Light and the successor to the original Mega Man. He is a new type of robot with the ability to think, feel, and make his own decisions. Recognizing the potential danger of this model, Light sealed X away in a diagnostic capsule for over 30 years of testing. X's capsule is uncovered by an archaeologist named Dr. Cain almost 100 years after X's creation. Excited by the possibilities X presented, Cain disregarded the warnings Light had logged in the capsule and created a legion of robots that replicated X's free will; these robots were called "Reploids" ("Repliroids" (レプリロイド) in Japan).

A number of Reploids turned against humans led by the rebellious Reploid Sigma. These Reploids are dubbed "Mavericks" ("Irregulars" (イレギュラー) in Japan), and a force called the Maverick Hunters ("Irregular Hunters" (イレギュラーハンター)) was formed to combat them. The Maverick Hunters were led by Sigma until he, too, became a Maverick and declared war against the humans, thus starting the Maverick War. X takes it upon himself to join the Maverick Hunters under his superior Zero. Throughout the series, X and Zero battle against the Mavericks to stop their plots to destroy the human race. Sigma continues using his power and a virus to create more conflicts with the Maverick Hunters and attempt to destroy the planet in the process. While X and Zero also gain new allies, in Mega Man X7 they work with the missing Maverick, Axl, who becomes their partner. In the latest game, Mega Man X8, it is revealed New Generation Reploids are doomed to become Sigma copies with the original Sigma dying in the process in his final showdown with the Hunters.

After the series reached an unresolved cliffhanger, a game entitled Mega Man X Dive was released by Capcom Taiwan in which a human plays Mega Man X, until due in part to some corrupted data known as Maverick Data, he/she gets transported into the Deep Log, a massive database with data on every Mega Man game. The player must progress through the scrambled code of the Maverick Wars, Elf Wars, and the Game Of Destiny, to destroy the Maverick Data causing the slow corruption of the Deep Log. In contrast to the Mega Man Zero and ZX sequel series, the spin-off Mega Man X: Command Mission instead is set in a future where X is a veteran Maverick Hunter dealing with rebellions. Capcom expressed their desire to portray X and Zero as stronger versions in this spin-off of their previous incarnations even if they come across as out-of-character to the audience.

== Characters ==
=== Maverick Hunters ===
The Maverick Hunters, known as Irregular Hunters (イレギュラーハンター, Iregyurā Hantā) are a group of Reploids who protect humans and other Reploids from Mavericks and are the heroes of the Mega Man X series, with its protagonists being prominent Maverick Hunters. When they are introduced in Mega Man X, they have existed for some time, having been founded by Dr. Cain, who has since retired. From Mega Man X onward, they battle Sigma and the other Mavericks.

==== X ====
X is the main protagonist of the Mega Man X series. Dr. Light created him, but feared the ramifications of giving robots free will and so chose to seal him inside a capsule for 30 years to test the integrity and reliability of his systems. Light died before X's diagnostics were complete, and 100 years later another scientist, Dr. Cain, discovered his capsule and attempted to emulate his technology. With X's help, Cain developed the first mass-produced Reploids: humanoid androids based upon X's designs.

==== Zero ====
Originally intended to be the protagonist of Mega Man X, he was recast as X's mentor and partner in favor of an X who looked "more like Mega Man". He is a top-class Maverick Hunter who undergoes inner turmoil over his mysterious past and purpose, which he seems to see glimpses of in nightmares, and the fact that the Virus does not affect him like it does with other reploids, who become Mavericks.

==== Axl ====
Voiced by (English): Lenne Hardt (X7); Jeffrey Watson (X8)
Voiced by (Japanese): Minami Takayama

Axl (アクセル, Akuseru) is a black and red-armored reploid with an X-shaped scar above his nose who wields a pair of handheld blaster pistols. He first appears in Mega Man X7, where he displays an ability called A-Trans, which allows him to take on the appearance and abilities of any reploid he defeats which matches his size, allowing him to explore normally inaccessible areas. He also has the ability to hover in midair and roll through enemy shots. While his gameplay style was originally similar to X, Mega Man X8 reworked his gameplay to give him a distinctive fighting style. His shots are now rapid-fire abilities and can fire in any direction, and instead of copying the Maverick weapons like X, he instead gains a new type of gun for each boss he defeats, which have unlimited ammo and can be fired either multi-directional or rapid-fire. While overall the weakest in power, Axl's fighting style relies more on speed compared to X's powerful but slower charge shots and Zero's swordplay.

==== Dr. Cain ====
Voiced by (English): Michael Shepherd
Voiced by (Japanese): Tadashi Miyazawa

Dr. Cain is a human archaeologist and robot expert, who serves as a supporting character throughout the Mega Man X games. He discovered the dormant X in the ruins of Dr. Light's lab, and soon after invented Reploids, sapient robots based on X's design, with the most notable being Sigma. Sigma, being the most advanced robot at the time, became the head of the Maverick Hunters, a group of reploids dedicated to destroying reploids that violate the three rules of robotics.

==== Iris ====
Voiced by (Japanese): Yūko Mizutani (PXZ); Aya Endō (X DiVE–present)

Repliforce scientists created Iris alongside her brother Colonel as one half of the "Perfect Soldier program", with Colonel being the other half. She was compassionate and peaceful, while Colonel was a strong-willed Reploid warrior. Repliforce scientists struggled to make these two factors into one Reploid, and because the differences were irreconcilable, they split them into brother and sister Reploids.

In Mega Man X4, Iris is one of the two characters alongside Double who can only be fought depending on whether the player chooses Zero or X.

==== Alia ====
Voiced by (English): Rumiko Varnes (X7); Marriete Sluyter (X8)
Voiced by (Japanese): Rumi Kasahara

Alia acts as a Navigator for the Maverick Hunters in Mega Man X5 and onwards. She began her career as a researcher in Reploid engineering alongside her colleague Gate, whom she was said to have feelings for. They were ahead of their time in their research on Reploids, though she contends that Gate was a better programmer than she was. However, Gate's inability to follow the rules made him a social outcast, and his creations were systematically destroyed, sometimes with Alia's assistance. She soon mastered programming languages and was chosen to be a spotter for the Hunters. In Mega Man X5, Alia served as the Hunters' spotter during the Sigma Virus outbreak, while lending her technical talents to the cause by uploading and letting X utilize the Falcon and Gaea armor.

==== Layer ====
Voiced by (English): Meredith Taylor Parry
Voiced by (Japanese): Sonoko Kawata

Layer is a navigator alongside Alia and Pallette in X8, with her high processing power allowing her to quickly determine enemy abilities. For the most part, Layer appears to be the oldest navigator and is calm and collected. However, she seems to show more concern for Zero, even blushing when talking to him. Palette's comment on how she "waited the whole time for him" seemingly implies that she has a crush on him. Layer is also a secret unlockable character in the game, and has gameplay similar to Zero's. She wields her own sword weapon, the "Layer Rapier", allowing her to use the same abilities as Zero, but cannot use his "Black Armor".

==== Pallette ====
Voiced by (English): Chris Simms
Voiced by (Japanese): Haruna Mima

Pallette is another navigator alongside Alia and Layer in X8 who excels at finding hidden routes at facilities, allowing X to find Dr. Light's armor capsules. She appears to be the most playful of the navigators and hates being ignored. Pallette is also an unlockable character in the game, taking after Axl's playstyle but being unable to use Axl's copy ability.

==== Douglas ====
Douglas is a mechanic for the Maverick Hunters. In Mega Man X5, he constructs modules for X and Zero and reinforces the Enigma Cannon and Space Shuttle with parts they gather from the Mavericks. During the Nightmare outbreak in X6, Douglas helps X and Zero by refining modules for them.

==== Signas ====
Voiced by (English): Robert Belgrade (X7); Roger Rhodes (X8)
Voiced by (Japanese): Hirotaka Suzuoki (X7); Tsuneyoshi Iwatsuru (X8)

Signas is the newest leader and commander of the Maverick Hunters, who is introduced in X5. He was originally a private investigator before being assigned to the Maverick Hunters, commanding missions and overseeing major operations. He is loyal to both humans and Reploids and is determined to ensure that all Mavericks are eliminated. He has the most advanced CPU of the current Reploids.

=== Mavericks ===
Mavericks, known as Irregulars (イレギュラー, Iregyurā) in Japan, are Reploids who have turned against humans, usually violently. Reploids can become Mavericks for a variety of reasons, such as a virus or their own free will. As the chronology of the Mega Man franchise progresses, the term "Maverick" comes to mean any individual or creature, human or Reploid, that presents a threat to civilization or those in power.

==== Sigma ====
Sigma (シグマ, Shiguma) is the primary antagonist of the Mega Man X series, who Dr. Cain considered to be the finest reploid of the time, with circuitry designs meant to prevent him from becoming a Maverick. He was once the leader of the Maverick Hunters, but during a mission, he came into contact with Zero, who at the time was rampaging after falling under the influence of the Zero Virus.

Prior to the first Mega Man X game, Sigma was the most advanced Reploid of his time and the leader of the Maverick Hunters. However, one day, the Maverick Hunters received reports of a powerful "Red Maverick" that had destroyed an entire squadron of Hunters. While investigating, Sigma and his unit tracked it down to an abandoned laboratory and learned that it was Zero, an evil robot created by Dr. Wily who carried the Maverick Virus. After Sigma defeated Zero, the virus was inadvertently transferred into him. While the virus was purged from Zero, turning him benevolent, the virus adapted to Sigma, becoming the Sigma Virus. Sigma led a mass revolt among the Reploids, declaring total war on humans and seeking to carry out a genocide against them. Many Maverick Hunters chose to follow Sigma out of loyalty, leaving Zero in charge of the organization. X, the last creation of Dr. Light and the base model for the Reploids, decided to volunteer and joined Zero. X and Zero battle through the Maverick regime, and ultimately X destroys Sigma; however, while his physical body is scrapped, his "soul", the Virus, survives. After the end credits, Sigma's face appears on a blue monitor and warns X that he will be back.

Sigma returns in each installment of the series in various forms, but X defeats him each time. His final appearance is in Mega Man X8, where he is finally destroyed for good. However, the Sigma Virus remains, prompting the events of the Mega Man Zero series.

==== Vile ====
Voiced by (English): Roger Rhodes
Voiced by (Japanese): Mugihito

Vile, known as VAVA (ヴァヴァ) in Japanese, is a recurring major villain in the Mega Man X series, who frequently reappears as a mid-game boss. He is first introduced in Mega Man X, where he is a former Maverick Hunter now serving Sigma as his right-hand man.

==== Maverick Bosses ====
The Maverick Bosses are Reploids who are themed after animals and work with the Maverick Hunters. The exceptions to this theming are Wire Sponge, Spike Rosered, Tornado Tonion, and Optic Sunfloward, who are respectively themed after the plants sponge gourd, rose, onion, and sunflower.

== Games ==
=== Main games ===
Mega Man X
1993	Mega Man X
1994	Mega Man X2
1995	Mega Man X3
1996
1997	Mega Man X4
1998
1999
2000	Mega Man X5
2000	Mega Man Xtreme
2001	Mega Man Xtreme 2
2001	Mega Man X6
2002
2003	Mega Man X7
2004	Mega Man X: Command Mission
2004	Mega Man X8
2005	Mega Man Maverick Hunter X
2006	Mega Man X Collection
2007
2008
2009
2010
2011	Mega Man X Mobile
2012
2013
2014
2015
2016
2017
2018	Mega Man X Legacy Collection
2018	Mega Man X Legacy Collection 2
2019
2020	Mega Man X DiVE
2021
2022
2023	Mega Man X DiVE Offline

- Mega Man X was released for the Super Nintendo in Japan on 17 December 1993, 19 January 1994 in North America and on 1 May 1994 in PAL regions.
- Mega Man X2 was released for the Super Nintendo on 16 December 1994 in Japan, January 1995 in North America, and 18 October 1995 in PAL regions.
- Mega Man X3 was released for the Super Nintendo on 1 December 1995. In Europe it was released on 15 May 1996. It was released on 4 January 1996 in North America. A port of Mega Man X3 was released on the Sega Saturn and PlayStation in Japan on 26 April 1996 and in Europe in March 1997. Capcom stated that it was licensing these versions to a USA company for release in North America, but ultimately they were never released in the region.
- Mega Man X4 was initially developed as a Sega Saturn exclusive and slated for a June 1997 release, but it was delayed and made multi-platform. Both console versions of Mega Man X4 were released in Japan on 1 August 1997.
- Mega Man X5 game was first released in Japan for the PlayStation on 30 November 2000. The North American release followed the next month on 31 January 2001. It was later released in Europe on 3 August 2001. A Microsoft Windows port was first released to retail in Asia on 30 July 2001, in Japan on 24 May 2002, and in North America on 20 August 2002.
- Mega Man X6 released on the PlayStation on 29 November 2001 in Japan, 11 December 2001 in North America, and 8 February 2002 in Europe.
- Mega Man X7 was first released in Japan for the PlayStation 2 on 17 July 2003 in North America on 14 October 2003 and Europe on 5 March 2004.
- Mega Man X8 was first released for the PlayStation 2 on 7 December 2004 in Japan, in Europe on 11 February 2005
- Mega Man Maverick Hunter X was released in North America for the PlayStation Portable on 31 January 2006, while a European release followed it on 3 March 2006.

=== Spin-offs ===
- Mega Man Xtreme was released in Japan for the Game Boy Color on 20 October 2000, and in North America on 10 January 2001.
- Mega Man Xtreme 2 was released in Japan for the Game Boy Color on 19 July 2001, and in North America in November the same year. On 18 July 2013, it was confirmed Mega Man Xtreme 2 would be released on the 3DS Virtual Console in Japan on 25 December 2013, and in North America on 29 May 2014.
- Mega Man X: Command Mission was released in Japan for the PlayStation 2 and GameCube on 29 July 2004; in North America on 21 September 2004; and in Europe on 19 November 2004. The North American PS2 version includes an unlockable demo version of Mega Man X8. To coincide with the release the launch of the game in North America, NubyTech announced Mega Man-themed game controllers for both console versions. However, only the GameCube version of the controller arrived with the release of Mega Man X Collection in early 2006.
- The Mega Man X Collection was released on 10 January 2006 for the PlayStation 2 and GameCube.
- The Mega Man X Legacy Collection became available for Windows via Steam, PlayStation 4, Xbox One, and Nintendo Switch on 24 July 2018, worldwide and 26 July 2018, in Japan. The names of the Maverick bosses were changed to translations of their original Japanese names.
- Mega Man X DiVE is a mobile game created by Capcom Taiwan developers. Released in parts of East and Southeast Asia on 24 March 2020. Released in Australia and India on 26 March 2020.
- Mega Man X DiVE Offline is a port of the original DiVE but without any online system in September 2023.
- Mega Man X on mobile was released to iOS and Android in 2011.

=== Cancelled games ===
==== Rockman X Interactive (1995–1996) ====
An interactive movie game known as Rockman X Interactive was in development between December 1995 and 1996; it would have featured several new characters and reportedly greatly influenced the direction of Super Adventure Rockman, another interactive movie which released in 1998. A copy of the design documents were once being sold on Yahoo! Auctions Japan, but were later taken down due to concerns about how the seller obtained them.

==== Maverick Hunter (2010) ====
In 2010, Armature Studio, a development studio founded by the creators of Metroid Prime, were developing a first-person shooter trilogy titled Maverick Hunter, which was intended to build on the mythology of Mega Man X. However, it was cancelled by Capcom after six months of development due to it being considered a "significant gamble" for the company. The game was one of the several cancelled Mega Man games of the 2010s, which also included Legends 3, Online, Universe and Star Force 4.

==== Rockman XZ: Time Rift (2020–2021) ====
Rockman XZ: Time Rift was first revealed in September 2020 on NebulaJoy's official website, which included the game's logo. It was a crossover game between the X and Zero series for mobile phones, in a similar vein to X DiVE. Shortly after footage of the game leaked online, it was announced that the title was cancelled in August due to the underperformance of Devil May Cry: Pillar of Combat.

== Gameplay ==
The player uses X's leg parts to have access to high areas in Mega Man X2 while using the arm parts to perform a stronger X-Buster shot.

The original Mega Man series on the NES consisted of 2D platform games that focus on run-and-gun gameplay. Mega Man X uses the same basic principles as its precursors but with many added options. X has, by default beginning with X2, the ability to dash along the ground, cling to walls, jump off walls, and dash jump to cover greater distance than a normal jump. This all gives X more mobility than his original series counterpart. At certain times, the player can pilot vehicles including in an attack mech and an attack hovercycle.

X is also able to locate capsules and tanks that permanently upgrade his armor. These upgrades are all either hidden or require an exceptional feat to reach. Upgrades common to each game are increased maximum hit points, "sub-tanks" which can be filled with surplus health pick-ups and then used at any time to refill the character's hit points, and the ability to charge weapons earned from bosses, which gives them an enhanced secondary fire mode. In later games, there are multiple armor types available that can either be mixed and matched, or completed for additional armor set bonuses.

Mega Man X3 is the first game in the series which allows the player to play as X's ally Zero, although his playability is more limited compared to later games in the series. He relies on his saber almost exclusively starting in X4. Zero is more melee-oriented than X by using a "Z-Saber" sword. Rather than acquiring weapons from the bosses (with the exception of his Giga Attack), Zero learns special techniques that do not require ammo such as the "Hienkyaku" air-dash and "Kuuenbu" double-jump. However, Zero cannot upgrade any of his body parts in this game. In X6 and X7, the player can rescue Reploids to replenish health and acquire upgrades not otherwise available. In X7, the playable character Axl is introduced. Axl utilizes two guns known as Axl Bullets. In X8, a tag system is introduced, along with a new Double Attack feature, where the two selected characters can attack at the same time.

Mavericks serve like a boss. The stage boss Mavericks are based on various types of organisms (usually animals, but plants and fungi are also represented) instead of being humanoid, as were most of the bosses in the classic series, although their attacks and names are usually based on mechanical or chemical phenomena or laws of physics like in the original games. Defeating a Maverick allows X to use that Maverick's signature weapon. Each boss is particularly weak to one special weapon, so the player may complete the stages in an order that best exploits these weaknesses.

== Production ==
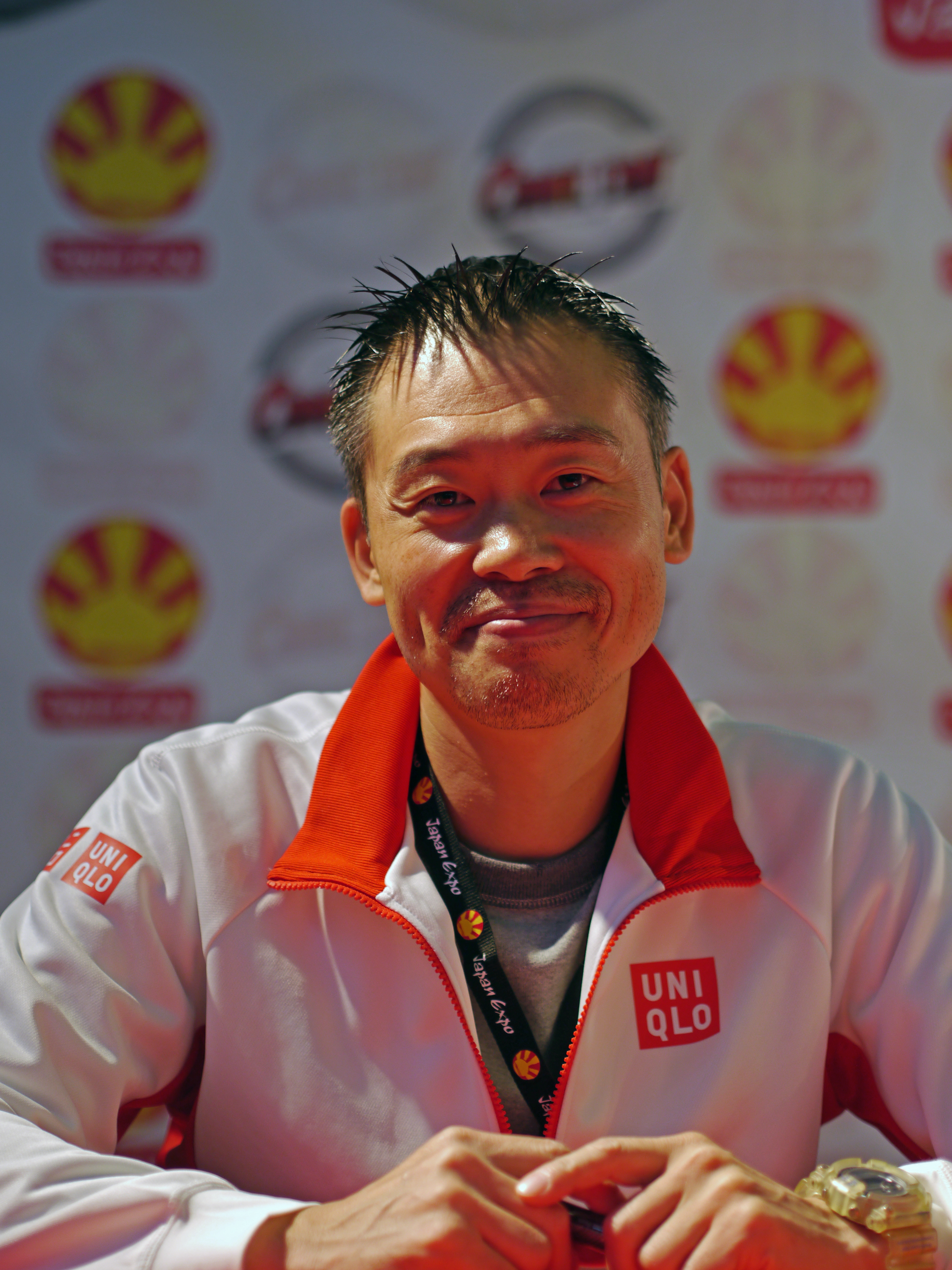
Long time Capcom developer Keiji Inafune was partly responsible for the creation of the Mega Man X series as part improving the original Mega Man series.

Mega Man X was developed by a team at Capcom which had worked on the long-running Mega Man series for the NES. Lead artist Keiji Inafune (credited as a planner as Inemuryar) recounted that the development of Mega Man X required a lot of brainstorming for its storyline and content where the team's goal was to branch out from original Mega Man games while still maintaining their fundamentals. In the original Mega Man series, Inafune typically designed the protagonist while his protégé Hayato Kaji handled the supporting characters. However, their roles were reversed for Mega Man X. Inafune and Kaji worked simultaneously on the various designs for X with different pieces of armor attached. The idea for the armor parts came about because the game was planned during a time when role-playing video games were becoming extremely popular. Inafune felt that Mega Man had always represented a classic action game formula in which the hero earns his defeated enemies' abilities; the armor parts were added to supplement this concept.

The development team additionally wanted the world of Mega Man X to be much more sophisticated than in the first Mega Man series. They wanted to accomplish this with Zero's "hardcore" personality and the game's antagonist Sigma. As stated by Inafune, the original series' villain Dr. Wily had "a side to him you couldn't really hate". Sigma, however, was written as a once-good character suffering an "unforeseen error" that leads him to be completely evil. Starting with Mega Man X2, Inafune wanted to use a computer virus as a plot device, something he considered a more interesting idea than a tangible villain. This led to the creation of the Sigma Virus seen in Mega Man X3 onwards.

Originally, the Mega Man X3 team had no plans to provide a sequel until their superiors from Capcom aimed to try the X series on new hardware. The team aimed to make Zero different from X, he was remade as a proper samurai-like warrior who wields a Z-Saber instead of shooting like X. In order to get the approval to make Zero playable, the developers gave him special moves based on the Street Fighter fighting game series to compensate for lacking X's powers. In particular, Capcom struggled in the beginning with the number of backgrounds they had to draw, but were pleased with results. There were twice as many sprite animation patterns to create. Instead of presenting Repliforce as blatantly evil villains like Sigma, the writing staff decided to leave them some "moral leeway". They did not want the ideals of Repliforce and the Maverick Hunters to be so black-and-white.

Ever since the series started, Inafune wanted to add Dr. Wily to the story leading to the twist of Mega Man X4 that reveals he created Zero to set the climax of the series. Mega Man X5 was originally intended to be the final game in the Mega Man X series. According to Keiji Inafune, he had little to do with the title and told the staff his idea. Much to the dismay of Inafune, Capcom decided to publish Mega Man X6 the following year, in which Zero survived his fight from X5. Suetsugu believed that the navigator Alia might be the most fitting heroine in the series in contrast to the tragic Iris from Mega Man X4. Alia stood out as the only female character, which Suetsugu did not mind since the game is aimed towards a young demographic. As the idea of having a calm woman as navigator proved difficult to execute, the other navigator Roll Caskett from Mega Man Legends was used as a reference.

Kitabayashi explained that transitioning the character models of Mega Man X from 2D to 3D graphics was a challenge, but that including both 2D and 3D gameplay was not, as they had planned to have them in equal amounts for the game. The development team took into account the less-than-favorable reception for Mega Man X6, but instead of simply trying to make the next game new and fresh with 3D graphics, they decided to focus on "getting 3D right". The team also attempted to build upon the action-style gameplay for which the Mega Man franchise is known along with the more adult-themed storyline of the Mega Man X series. This involved adding the newer, non-traditional character Axl to deepen and better the narrative. Kitabayashi emphasized, "He's young, he's running away. He's like the new younger character of the group, and that's why I wanted to put him in there." However, the development team chose not to pursue 3D gameplay for Mega Man X8 simply because of its graphical style. The game's main illustrator, Tatsuya Yoshikawa, was an assistant in X7 and took a bigger role. He was responsible for designing the protagonists, the Maverick bosses, and the newer ancillary cast. Yoshikawa took into account what the characters may resemble if they were toys, and even imitated the joints of Revoltech figures. Similar to his previous work in X7, Yoshikawa wanted the designs to pander to his feelings about the first Mega Man X game while still following his own ideas too. The three main characters were revised for Mega Man X8 as Yoshikawa planned to give them more unique features to contrast their personalities.

== Other media ==
=== Animation ===
In Maverick Hunter X, the player can unlock an OVA called The Day of Sigma that details the events leading up to the first level, including Sigma turning Maverick; it was produced by Xebec (who also produced MegaMan NT Warrior and Mega Man Star Force) and later included in the Legacy Collection. Characters from the X series also appeared in the Mega Man animated series in the episode "Mega X", which was a pitch at an X series that never got off the ground.

=== Print media ===
Several tie-in manga adaptations have been released, mainly serialized in Kodansha's children's magazine Comic BomBom, its quarterly special issues and its sister magazine Deluxe BomBom. An adaptation of the first four games in the series by Yoshihiro Iwamoto ran from 1994 to 1998 and was collected into 12 volumes. An original story featuring elements from the first Mega Man X game called Irregular Hunter Rockman X by Shigeto Ikehara ran from 1994 to 1995 and was collected into two volumes. The magazine also published several one-shots, including one based on the Mega Mission carddass series by Hitoshi Ariga and an original self-contained story called Team X Shutsujin seyo!! by Daisuke Inoue. Yoshihiro wrote an alternative ending to Mega Man X5 in 2018.

The character of X appeared in the obscure Brazilian comic Novas Aventuras de Mega Man (translated as The New Adventures of Mega Man), where he is Classic Mega Man and Roll's younger brother; the comic rather notoriously implies that all three characters are attracted to each other in a sexual manner. Similarly, the fourth and final issue of the Dreamwave Productions comic series included a short story with Mega Man X at the end of the issue, where X travels back in time to get help from Classic Mega Man and Dr. Light; the intention was to publish a comic based on Mega Man X, however Dreamwave shut down before any issues were released.

Characters from Mega Man X appeared twice in the Archie Comics series; the first time was during the Dawn of X arc, and the second time was during the Sonic the Hedgehog crossover Sonic and Mega Man 2: Worlds Unite. Writers noted that prior to his introduction, many fans sent them messages expressing a desire to see X portrayed as a darker character. They decided not to start with the Command Mission incarnation, which depicted X as more of a leader.

Rockman X The Novel: Irregulars Report is a 2017 Japanese novelization based on the first Mega Man X video game, published by PHP Institute, Inc. and written by Todoroki Tsubasa, with illustrations and story cooperation by Yoshihiro Iwamoto, as well as collaboration from freelance illustrator and character designer Hi-GO!, also known by the pseudonym Guiltism.

In 2025, Cardsmiths, a cryptocurrency and trading card company, created an officially licensed Mega Man X themed trading card set featuring characters from the games. One Collector's Pack contains two packs with five cards in each pack. The set was going to feature rare "Cryptocurrency Redemption Cards" but due to negative backlash they were removed before the set released.

=== Crossovers ===
X and Zero have appeared in other video games. In Dead Rising, the protagonist, a photographer named Frank West can unlock and wear an X outfit. Zero also appears as a hidden character in Tatsunoko vs. Capcom: Ultimate All-Stars and as a playable character in Marvel vs. Capcom 3: Fate of Two Worlds, Ultimate Marvel vs. Capcom 3, Marvel vs. Capcom: Infinite, and Teppen. For Marvel vs. Capcom: Infinite, X was included due to his significant popularity with Western audiences alongside Zero. They also appeared in the two role-playing games Project X Zone and Project X Zone 2.

== Reception ==
Aggregate review scores
Game	GameRankings	Metacritic
Mega Man X	89%	
Mega Man X2	82%	
Mega Man X3	71%	
Mega Man X4	75% (SSAT); 74% (PS)	
Mega Man X5		76/100
Mega Man X6		65/100
Mega Man X7		58/100
Mega Man X: Command Mission		67/100 (GCN); 69/100 (PS2)
Mega Man X8		68/100
Mega Man Maverick Hunter X	82%	79/100

Several websites retrospectively held Mega Man X as a successful milestone in transitioning the Mega Man series from its increasingly stale existence on the NES to the SNES. IGN named it the twelfth-best on its own top 100 SNES games list in 2011. The sequel Mega Man X2 was often praised for providing the player with new content GameSpot editors Christian Nutt and Justin Speer were appreciative of Capcom's attempt at expanding Mega Man X2 over its predecessor in all aspects. By the release of Mega Man X4, critics praised the added option to play through the game as either X or Zero, noting that the drastic differences in the way the characters played the same levels added to the game's replay value. The English voice acting was still criticized for poor performances. Mega Man X5 was generally well-received as an appealing sidescroller, although several sites commented that it did not contribute new major ideas to the franchise. The next two games have been criticized for a harsh difficulty caused by poor design, as well as a recycled narrative. With the transition to 3D graphics, the general consensus was that the game's mixture of 2D and 3D gameplay was well-intentioned but poorly executed. The latest game, Mega Man X8, was generally praised for returning to a more classic style of Mega Man gameplay and removing the criticized gameplay elements of Mega Man X7, making it a much more appealing game than its previous two predecessors.

Mega Man X was a commercial success. The SNES version sold 1.165 million copies worldwide as of 2001,

IGN's Jeremy Dunham speculated that the game's more mature storyline and its inclusion of numerous gameplay extensions over the original Mega Man series helped create a "unique cadre of fans". The story is notable for being more violent than the predecessors with stages and bosses also looking scarier Capcom producer Kazuhiro Tsuchiya played the first Mega Man X in his youth, enjoying the successor to the first Mega Man character, X, due to he having new unique skills, helping to popularize the "golden age of action games". X's characterization was often praised for coming across as a unique tragic hero similar to Hayao Miyazaki's works as well as dystopian works in general, compared to Ghost in the Shell, Casshan, as well as other famous gaming icons like 2B from Nier Automata, and Raiden from Metal Gear, who question the nature of his missions. Alexander expressed feeling guilty upon completing the game as the final narration highlighted X's depression over the chaos of war. His popularity led to criticism in Mega Man X7 for being the first and only time to have him unlockable and the player having to use his replacement Axl instead.

Meanwhile, Zero stood out mainly in his debut as playable character due to having own iconic techniques. Additionally, Brett Elston from GamesRadar credited Zero as one of the reasons the X series became so popular and that his own popularity within gamers earned him his own video game series. When compared with Zero, X was often seen as the less compelling character, with Zero being the more memorable of the two. The villain Sigma Sigma was praised for his backstory, resulting in the story of Mega Man X having unclear morality. Patrick Lee of The A.V. Club, however, stated that Sigma is "exactly the sort of boogeyman anti-progress allegories are built around". Saying that he is the "first piece of technology the Mega Man series suggests was a mistake to create", he says that Sigma runs contrary to the previous, optimistic themes of the series, which suggest that technology is ultimately beneficial to mankind, and that robots are "morally neutral tools". He described this "more cynical worldview" as "anti-technology scaremongering."
