= Mega Man X5 =

2000 video game

- North American PlayStation cover art
- Developer: Capcom Production Studio 3
- Publisher: Capcom
- Director: Koji Okohara
- Producer: Tatsuya Minami
- Designers: Toyozumi Sakai; Akiteru Naka
- Artists: Haruki Suetsugu; Ryuji Higurashi
- Composers: Naoto Tanaka; Naoya Kamisaka; Takuya Miyawaki
- Series: Mega Man X
- Platforms: PlayStation, Windows
- Release: PlayStation: JP: November 30, 2000; NA: January 31, 2001; EU: August 3, 2001; Microsoft Windows: AS: July 30, 2001; JP: May 24, 2002; NA: August 20, 2002
- Genres: Action, platform
- Mode: Single-player

Mega Man X5 (Note: Known in Japan as Rockman X5 (ロックマンX5, Rokkuman Ekkusufaibu)) is a 2000 action-platform game and the fifth main installment in the Mega Man X series. Developed by Capcom, it was first released for the PlayStation in Japan on November 30, 2000, and in North America and PAL territories the following year. In 2002, the game was ported to Microsoft Windows as retail packages in both Japan and North America.

Players control X and Zero, heroes who traverse eight selectable stages and acquire the special weapon of each stage's boss. Mega Man X5 was intended to be the final game in its series, according to Capcom producer Keiji Inafune. Its story is set in the 22nd century, in a world where humans coexist with androids called "Reploids". X and Zero once again face their nemesis Sigma who aims to destroy the planet and infect all Reploids with a virus.

The design of X's upgrades, new villains, and new tactics for the platform franchise were the biggest focus from Capcom when developing the game. It was a commercial success and garnered a generally positive reception among critics, many of whom agreed that it would satisfy diehard fans of the series despite the stale gameplay formula and presentation of the story. It was re-released in 2006 as part of the Mega Man X Collection for the PlayStation 2 and in the Mega Man X Legacy Collection 2 in 2018 for additional consoles.

== Gameplay ==
X is attacked by a Sigma Virus.

The gameplay in Mega Man X5 is similar to the previous installments of the Mega Man X series. The player is presented with a series of action-platforming stages that can be cleared in any order desired. The core aspects of gameplay are largely unchanged from previous installments, though X5 differs from its predecessor in a few notable ways. Before each level, players can choose whether to play as the shooter X or the swordsman Zero. X focuses on distanced combat using his X-Buster while the latter instead uses his Z-Saber in close combat. Defeating bosses results in the two characters gaining new weapons and techniques, respectively. and for the first time in the franchise, players are able to change the game's difficulty. The characters gain the new movement mechanics of crouching and hanging from ropes.

Between the two characters, the one not chosen at the start of the game is disadvantaged – X loses his "Fourth Armor" (a less-powerful recreation of his armor from Mega Man X4), and Zero loses his Z-Buster weapon. X has four enhancing armor sets available: the Fourth Armor, the secret Ultimate Armor, and two others that must be assembled from parts found in capsules. X cannot wear any individual armor part without the rest of the matching set. Zero can find and enter Dr. Light's armor capsules, but in most cases he cannot use the armor parts inside – he can only retrieve them to deliver to X. If Zero reaches the capsule containing X's Ultimate Armor, Dr. Light offers him the "Black Zero" armor instead, which enhances his abilities.

After the introduction stage, the player has 16 attempts to challenge four Maverick bosses in stages to complete the Enigma weapon needed to protect the planet from a space colony. A mid-boss named Dynamo also appears at predetermined intervals, stalling the player for time. If X is infected by a sufficient number of Sigma's viruses, his health begins to rapidly decline. Zero is affected differently by this level of infection – he becomes briefly invincible, with increased attack power. At any point between levels, the player can choose to fire the Enigma at the Eurasia, though the chance of success increases as the game progresses.

== Plot ==
Like other entries in the series, Mega Man X5 takes place in "21XX", an unspecified year in the 22nd century, where humans have adapted to life with intelligent androids dubbed "Reploids". However, Reploids occasionally become rebellious "Mavericks", causing crimes and chaos.

The series' primary antagonist, Sigma, spreads a computer virus across the Earth, causing a series of new infected Mavericks. He also hires a Reploid mercenary named Dynamo to hijack the orbiting space colony Eurasia, infecting it with a new virus that puts it on a collision course with Earth. To prevent Eurasia from striking the planet, the peacekeeping Maverick Hunters pursue two options: firing a powerful cannon called "Enigma" at Eurasia to vaporize it, or failing that, launching a space shuttle and piloting it into the colony to destroy it.

To maximize their chances of success, Hunters X and Zero are dispatched to collect parts for the two devices with the aid of their new teammates Alia, Douglas, and Signas. The necessary parts to upgrade the Enigma and shuttle are held by eight Mavericks, and X and Zero must defeat them to claim the parts. If the Enigma cannon or the shuttle succeeds in striking the colony, the impact is still disastrous but greatly lessened. If the shuttle fails or if time expires, the colony crashes into the planet intact, nearly destroying it. At the point of the colony's impact, dubbed Area Zero, a new virus appears that gives off readings highly similar to Zero; it is dubbed the Zero Virus. Additionally, if the colony was not destroyed, Zero suddenly appears at Area Zero resonating with the Zero Virus, becoming a Maverick. X (and Zero, if the colony was destroyed) proceeds to hunt for the source of the virus within Area Zero, penetrating a bizarre cybertronic fortress beneath it. In the fortress, X and the infected Zero cross paths, where mutual suspicion and mistrust leads them to duel.

After the duel, the story diverges into a few possible paths, each with its own ending:

- If Zero's mind is unaffected by the virus, he saves himself and X from an ambush by Sigma, and they confront Sigma together. Upon defeating him, Sigma attempts to take the Hunters down with him with a final laser blast. X tries to save Zero, but both Hunters are critically damaged. At this point, the endings diverge again depending on the player's chosen character. If Zero defeats Sigma, he reflects on his origin and life before dying. If X defeats Sigma, he inherits Zero's beam saber weapon and lives on as a Hunter.
- If Zero becomes a Maverick as a result of the virus, he sacrifices himself to save X from Sigma's ambush, and X continues on alone. Upon defeating Sigma, X is badly damaged. A mysterious holographic figure, implied to be Dr. Light, recovers him but deletes all his memories of Zero. After recovering, X desires to create "Elysium", a utopian society for humans and Reploids to live together in peace.

== Development ==
Mega Man X5 was originally intended to be the final game in the Mega Man X series. According to producer Keiji Inafune, he had little to do with the title and told the staff his idea. Much to the dismay of Inafune, Capcom decided to publish Mega Man X6 the following year, in which Zero survived his fight from X5. Haruki Suetsugu, an artist for Mega Man X4, designed almost all of the characters and promotional artwork for X5, adding various details to differentiate the characters from each other. Advancements in technology allowed the team to improve the visuals of the game over the previous installment. X5 uses still images without voiceovers instead of the animated cutscenes displayed in X4, which bothered Suetsugu as the price players paid was the same as before. Artist Hitoshi Ariga agreed with this sentiment as the boss characters were unvoiced.

Suetsugu believed that the navigator Alia might be the most fitting heroine in the series in contrast to the tragic Iris from Mega Man X4. Alia stood out as the only female character, which Suetsugu did not mind since the game is aimed towards a young demographic. As the idea of having a calm woman as navigator proved difficult to execute, the other navigator Roll Caskett from Mega Man Legends was used as a reference. The villain Dynamo was based on Western movies, with a design that combined features from X and Zero. X's new Falcon Armor was designed by Ryuji Higurashi to resemble a bird with a beak-shaped chest piece, wings coming out of the back, and a talon-like arm cannon. Suetsugu designed the Gaea Armor to resemble Sanagiman from the Inazuman manga series. Other new characters were introduced to expand the roster of the Maverick Hunters beyond just the fighters, with Signas being the most mature among them and possibly having connections to the Repliforce from X4. Douglas and Lifesaver were created as minor characters for the roles of mechanic and doctor, respectively.

The game does not employ voice acting, except that yells in the Japanese version were performed by Showtaro Morikubo, who replaced Kentarō Itō as X's voice actor, and by Ryōtarō Okiayu for Zero. Morikubo found the task challenging as he was debuting as a musician during the release of X5.

The Maverick bosses in the English localization of the game are named after members of the American hard rock band Guns N' Roses. Capcom voice actress Alyson Court, who was involved in the game's English localization, chose the new names as a tribute to her then-husband's love of the band. For the Mega Man X Legacy Collection 2 release, the names of the Maverick bosses were changed to translations of their original Japanese names.

The musical score for Mega Man X5 was composed by Naoto Tanaka, Naoya Kamisaka, and Takuya Miyawaki. The Japanese version of the game features "Monkey" as the opening theme and "Mizu no Naka" (水の中, Inside the Water) as the closing theme, both composed and performed by Morikubo and his band Mosquito Milk. The theme songs were included in the Rockman Theme Song Collection, published by Suleputer in 2002, and all of the game's instrumental and vocal music was included on the Capcom Music Generation: Rockman X1 ~ X6 soundtrack, released by Suleputer in 2003.

The game was first released in Japan for the PlayStation on November 30, 2000. The North American release followed the next month on January 31, 2001. It was later released in Europe on August 3, 2001. A Microsoft Windows port was first released to retail in Asia on July 30, 2001, in Japan on May 24, 2002, and in North America on August 20, 2002. The game was included in the North American Mega Man X Collection for GameCube and PlayStation 2 in 2006. In 2014, the PlayStation Network released Mega Man X5 alongside X4. It became available for Windows via Steam, PlayStation 4, Xbox One, and Nintendo Switch as a part of Mega Man X Legacy Collection 2 on July 24, 2018, worldwide and July 26, 2018, in Japan.

== Reception ==
Reception

Aggregate score
Aggregator	Score
Metacritic	76/100

Review scores
Publication	Score
Electronic Gaming Monthly	6.83/10
Eurogamer	5/10
Famitsu	27/40
GamePro	5/5
GameRevolution	B
GameSpot	7.1/10
IGN	8.5/10
Official U.S. PlayStation Magazine	3.5/5

Mega Man X5 was generally well-received as an appealing sidescroller, although several sites commented that it did not contribute new major ideas to the franchise. GameRevolution enjoyed the contrasting gameplay system between X and Zero as well as the improved graphics. Official U.S. PlayStation Magazine stated that the game's difficulty felt harsher than previous installments as a result of enemy placement but still appreciated the focus on more checkpoints and continues, which balance it out. While they also appreciated the storytelling and multiple endings, they panned the idea of being forced into several cutscenes in the middle of the game without offering new ideas. Eurogamer agreed that players would need to properly collect most power-ups, like heart-shaped items, to make X and Zero able to fight the bosses. He found the system so repetitive that he instead recommended playing the related series, Legends, which he finds more innovative. Electronic Gaming Monthly found several parts of the game to be similar to Mega Man X4 and that the characters' interactions were cheesy. GameSpot said the gameplay would appeal to non-Mega Man fans and gamers in general due to the attention given to detail and the design of the new bosses. GamePro was more positive on the new content and improvements made over X4 and found it important for most fans.

Regarding the game's presentation, responses were mixed. GameRevolution enjoyed the narrative associated with Armageddon but still felt it was poorly executed due to having to retread previous stages at the cost of losing hours to attack the colony. Both IGN and GameSpot enjoyed the presentation for relying on nostalgic tracks fitting for popular Super Nintendo games. The PC port was also the focus of some reviews, with Absolute Games criticizing the lack of noticeable improvements to the visuals or gameplay compared to Mega Man X4. On the other hand, Wolf praised the handling of stages and skills needed to defeat the bosses.

According to the Japanese publication Famitsu, Mega Man X5 was the third best-selling video game in Japan during its release week, with 46,033 copies sold. It placed at number eight the following week with an additional 22,963 copies sold. Media Create sales information showed that the game was the 96th best-selling video game in Japan in 2000. Dengeki Online reported that Mega Man X5 sold a total of 215,687 copies in Japan by the end of 2001, listing it as the 132nd best-selling game of the year in the region. Toy Retail Sales Tracking (TRST) data showed that X5 was the fifth best-selling PlayStation game in North America for the month of February 2001. The game was eventually re-released as part of Sony's PlayStation The Best for Family collection of budget titles in Japan.
