= Sigma (Mega Man X) =

Mega Man X character

- Mega Man character
- Sigma as he appears in Mega Man X Dive
- First game: Mega Man X (1993)
- Created by: Keiji Inafune
- Voiced by: English: Jim Byrnes (1995 Animated Special; Charlie Fontana (Mega Man X4); Walter Roberts (Mega Man X7); Dave Pettitt (Mega Man X8); Gerald Matthews (Maverick Hunter X); Chris Tergliafera (Marvel vs Capcom: Infinite); Japanese; Mugihito (1997–present)

Sigma (Japanese: シグマ, Hepburn: Shiguma) is a fictional character and the main antagonist of the Mega Man X video game series. Created by Dr. Cain, Sigma was considered the finest of the Reploids and was the first leader of the Maverick Hunters, peacekeeping androids who defend humans against their renegade counterparts. Although he was once respectable, Sigma unexpectedly goes berserk during Mega Man X and rebels against humankind after coming into contact with the Maverick Virus. He defects to the Mavericks and assumes the role of their leader. Due to the virus integrated into his circuits, he can survive seemingly anything, and constantly returns to menace the world.

Sigma has appeared in almost every Mega Man X video game since his first appearance in the 1993 title Mega Man X. He has received praise from critics and fans for his design and charisma as a villain, though his introduction was noted as marking a darker and more pessimistic theme for Mega Man X compared to other Mega Man sub-series.

== Characteristics ==
Sigma appears as a tall, bald humanoid in most of his forms. As the former leader of the Maverick Hunters, Sigma is a capable military leader, rendering him a devious and strategic opponent to his primary enemies, X and Zero. Sigma is a skilled and charismatic manipulator, managing to turn various Reploids, Maverick Hunters, and Mavericks to his side. Although he has been killed countless times, Sigma's programming always survives, either building himself a new form, or is revived by Reploid and Maverick admirers alike; it is implied that he grows more insane with each revival. He is fond of incorporating himself into battlesuits vastly more significant than his "regular" form. He serves as the final boss in all games except Mega Man X: Command Mission and Mega Man X8 (he does not appear in the former and in the latter, Sigma is the penultimate boss).

== Appearances ==
=== Mega Man X series ===
Before the first Mega Man X game, Sigma was the most advanced Reploid of his time, leading the Maverick Hunters. However, one day, the Maverick Hunters received reports of an overwhelmingly powerful "Red Maverick" that destroyed an entire squadron of Hunters. While investigating, Sigma, along with his unit, tracked it down to an abandoned laboratory and faced the Maverick alone. The Maverick is revealed to be Zero, an evil robot created by Dr. Wily that carried a computer virus called "Maverick Virus". After Sigma defeats Zero, the virus inadvertently transfers into Sigma. While the virus is purged from Zero, turning him benevolent, the virus adapts to Sigma, becoming the Sigma Virus.

After gradually succumbing to the virus, he suddenly leads a mass revolt among the Reploids, declaring total war on humans. Many Maverick Hunters follow Sigma out of loyalty, leaving Zero in charge of the organization. X, the last creation of Dr. Light and the base model for every Reploid decides to volunteer and joins Zero. X and Zero battle through the Maverick regime, and it is X who finally destroys Sigma. But though his physical body is scrapped, Sigma's "soul" (the Virus) survives. After the end credits roll, Sigma's face appears on a blue monitor and warns X that he will be back.

Sigma returns in each installment of the series in various forms but is defeated by X each time. His final appearance is in Mega Man X8 – although he is finally destroyed for good, the Sigma Virus would remain, prompting the events of the Mega Man Zero series.

=== Other appearances ===
Sigma appears in the crossover game Marvel vs. Capcom Infinite. In the story mode, he merges with Ultron to become "Ultron Sigma" to convert the inhabitants of both of their worlds into their slaves. Sigma as a playable character is available for purchase as standalone downloadable content or as part of the game's character pass.

Sigma makes a minor appearance in the Mega Man (1994) episode "Mega X".

Sigma appears in a short unlockable OVA in Mega Man Maverick Hunter X entitled "The Day of Σ". It shows the Maverick Hunters before the events of the first Mega Man X game under Sigma's command, before he ultimately revolts.

== Development ==
Mega Man X was originally meant to have a team of three villains, one tall, one short, and one chubby. However, the designs by Keiji Inafune were merged to create a single villain, Sigma. These designs were later reused as the basis for Mega Man X2's X-Hunters. Ever since his creation, Inafune aimed parts of his appearance to hint at a connection with Mega Man villain Dr. Wily. He was created with the idea of being an "absolute evil" type character to fit the dark narrative of the games as Sigma is a villain despite being manufactured to be pure good. Starting with Mega Man X2, Inafune wanted to use a computer virus as a plot device, something he considered a more interesting idea than a tangible villain. This led to the creation of the Sigma Virus seen in Mega Man X3 onwards.

Inafune denied multiple claims from his fans that Sigma was based on Sagat from the Street Fighter series and that he is instead an original character. Kaiser Sigma was designed with the idea of being more "messy" than the original design of the character. With the creation of Mega Man X4, Inafune originally avoided featuring Sigma since the story of the such game involved a lack of black and white view of the scenario. Since Sigma received major damage in X5, he was redesigned in X6 to lack his early menace and instead "messy". In Mega Man X8 a new villain named Lumine appears; to contrast his angel-like appearance, Sigma was instead made to look like a demon.

== Merchandise ==
A figure of Sigma was released by Tamashii Nations in 2013.

== Reception ==
Sigma was praised for his backstory, resulting in the story of Mega Man X having unclear morality. Peter Tieryas of Kotaku stated that he felt guilty after defeating Sigma, due to the Mavericks' origins as normal Reploids whose design was patterned after the series protagonist, and that they just wanted independence. As a result of his lack of humanity when becoming a Maverick and desire to eliminate all humans in the world, in the book the 30th Anniversary Capcom Characters, Sigma was seen as a far darker villain than the original Mega Man antagonist, Dr. Wily. Destructoid cited the original Sigma as one of the hardest bosses he has encountered when playing the franchise and noted that besides X's overpowered Hadoken move, the game offers several hidden treasures that can aid the player a better chance at defeating the final boss and his several phases as a form of good game design. Meanwhile, Den of Geek cited the Sigma from Mega Man X3 as one of the best video game bosses from the Super Nintendo due to the multiple forms he takes and the challenge it takes to defeat him. Eurogamer noted that while the player might relate to X's last monlogue in the original game, the twist in the end where Sigma is still alive changes the tone from peaceful to tragic as both X and the player will be forced to fight again, something X hates. IGN acknowledged that Sigma's role in the franchise is so repetitive in the series that fans look forward his appearance in the Minecraft collaboration.

Patrick Lee of The A.V. Club, however, stated that Sigma is "exactly the sort of boogeyman anti-progress allegories are built around". Saying that he is the "first piece of technology the Mega Man series suggests was a mistake to create", he says that Sigma runs contrary to the previous, optimistic themes of the series, which suggest that technology is ultimately beneficial to mankind, and that robots are "morally neutral tools". He described this "more cynical worldview" as "anti-technology scaremongering." Heather Alexandra of the same publication noted the character's heavy similarities with Overwatch's Sigma, to the point that they could be the same character. They called the Mega Man Sigma "a bit of a pest, to say the least," due to his ability to "leap into new robot bodies and other computer systems". In regards to the Sigma from the Mega Man X: Maverick Hunter original video animation, Bonus Stage Magazine noted that Sigma's characterization was different from the original timeline as he appears to express free will about his betrayal to the Maverick Hunter rather than being a victim of a virus he suffered when capturing Zero. Sigma's portrayal was the subject of analysis to Simão Cireneu Milani Addôr Nunes da Silva from Universidade Regional Integrada do Alto Uruguai e das Missões due to how Sigma's methods heavily contrasts with his underling X to the point that he does not share the same viewpoints from his ally Dr. Cain, who is interested in seeing X's entire potential. What Sigma does not understand, and tries to prove that his creator is not right, is that, as a being that has a capacity that, in the commander's view, limits him as Maverick Hunter, it can be synonymous with unlimited potential. While X was designed to help humans, Sigma instead believes Reploids are the superior race, meant to take over the world due to how their powers. Artist Keisuke Mizuno was impressed by the character of Sigma upon first seeing his backstory to the point he would make headcanons about what is the true reason which made him betray the Maverick Hunters in the first game.

With regards to Sigma's appearance in Marvel vs Capcom: Infinite, Mike Fahey from Kotaku thought the merging of Ultron and Sigma into an amalgamated being is "a great idea, and makes for a very cool visual", although he felt the game's idea of characters from Capcom's Mega Man, Resident Evil and Street Fighter franchises sharing the same world and knowing each other to be silly. Destructoid found Ultron Sigma's history too lazy as the player has to constantly face him in an appealing fight and then "fooders" in his place. Den of Geek criticized the idea of Sigma being DLC due to how important is his role in the fighting game and wanted to fight more the hybrid more instead in the story mode. Nevertheless, they considered Ultron Sigma as one of the best bosses in fighting game history, regarding his inclusion in Infinite as one of the best parts in the game.
