= Mega Man X Legacy Collection =

Mega Man X Legacy Collection 1 + 2
- Cover art for the first Mega Man X Legacy Collection
- Developer: Capcom
- Publisher: Capcom
- Director: Makoto Tanaka
- Series: Mega Man X
- Engine: MT Framework
- Platforms: Nintendo Switch, PlayStation 4, Windows, Xbox One
- Release: WW: July 24, 2018; JP: July 26, 2018
- Genres: Action, platform
- Mode: Single-player

Mega Man X Legacy Collection (Note: Japanese: ロックマンＸ アニバーサリー コレクション, Hepburn: Rokkuman Ekkusu Anibāsarī Korekushon; lit. Rockman X Anniversary Collection) is a video game compilation based on Capcom's Mega Man series. It compiles all eight main games in the Mega Man X series, originally released between 1993 and 2004 for the SNES, PlayStation, and PlayStation 2. Like other Mega Man Legacy Collection entries, it also includes various enhancements and behind-the-scenes materials. The compilation is split between two volumes, released simultaneously in 2018 for Nintendo Switch, PlayStation 4, Windows, and Xbox One.

== Overview ==
Mega Man X Legacy Collection is split between two volumes, each containing four games from the Mega Man X series. The first volume contains Mega Man X (1993), Mega Man X2 (1994), Mega Man X3 (1995), and Mega Man X4 (1997), while the second volume contains Mega Man X5 (2000), Mega Man X6 (2001), Mega Man X7 (2003), and Mega Man X8 (2004). X Legacy Collection features the SNES version of X3, as opposed to the PlayStation port featured in the previous Mega Man X compilation, Mega Man X Collection (2006). Each of the games can be played in either English or Japanese, and contain several screen size and filtering options.

Some modifications have been made to the individual games: the English names of the X5 Maverick bosses, which referenced the band Guns N' Roses in both the original release and 2006 collection, were changed in X Legacy Collection 2 into direct translations of their original Japanese names. X Legacy Collection 2 restores the Japanese voice tracks in the cutscenes of X6, which were omitted from the 2006 collection. Due to licensing reasons, select music tracks from X6–X8 have been replaced by new compositions in the international releases.

A save feature has been added to X–X3, though the password system is also retained. An easier "Rookie Hunter" difficulty has been added to all eight titles, which halves damage received; in X4–X8, Rookie Hunter also makes spikes less damaging and makes bottomless pits non-lethal. A new gameplay mode, "X Challenge", allows the player to fight two Mavericks from X–X6 at once, with some of these battles being exclusive to each volume. The collections also feature an extensive multimedia gallery including original trailers, merchandise images, concept art for all eight games, and the "Day of Sigma" animated short from Mega Man: Maverick Hunter X (2005).

== Release ==
Mega Man X Legacy Collection was announced on December 4, 2017, during a Mega Man 30th Anniversary livestream hosted by Capcom. On April 10, 2018, as part of the Mega Man X 25th Anniversary celebration, it was revealed that the eight games would be split between two volumes, along with the release date. Both volumes were released simultaneously in North America and Europe on July 24, 2018, including as a combined release under the name Mega Man X Legacy Collection 1 + 2. Like Mega Man Legacy Collection 1 + 2, the physical combined release for Switch contains a cartridge for X Legacy Collection and a download code for X Legacy Collection 2; the PlayStation 4 and Xbox One versions contain two discs, one for each volume. The Japanese release followed two days later on July 26, with both games available individually in physical format on Switch.

== Reception ==
Mega Man X Legacy Collection

Aggregate scores
Aggregator	Score
Metacritic	84/100 (NS); 89/100 (PS4); 86/100 (XB1)
OpenCritic	76% recommended

Review scores
Publication	Score
Destructoid	10/10
IGN	9/10
Jeuxvideo.com	15/20
Nintendo Life	9/10
Nintendo World Report	7/10
VentureBeat	9/10

Mega Man X Legacy Collection 2

Aggregate scores
Aggregator	Score
Metacritic	60/100 (NS); 63/100 (PS4)
OpenCritic	43% recommended

Review scores
Publication	Score
Destructoid	6.5/10
IGN	6/10
Jeuxvideo.com	9/20
Nintendo Life	7/10
Nintendo World Report	6/10
VentureBeat	7/10

Mega Man X Legacy Collection 1 + 2

Aggregate scores
Aggregator	Score
Metacritic	80/100 (NS); 80/100 (PS4); 77/100 (XB1)
OpenCritic	88% recommended

Review scores
Publication	Score
Electronic Gaming Monthly	4/5
GameRevolution	4/5
GameSpot	8/10
Hardcore Gamer	8/10
PlayStation Official Magazine – UK	8/10
Push Square	8/10
Shacknews	8/10
USgamer	4/5
VG247	4/5

== See also ==
- Mega Man X Collection, a previous compilation of the Mega Man X series
