= Mega Man X: Command Mission =

2004 video game

- North American cover art for PlayStation 2 featuring from left to right: Axl, X and Zero.
- Developer: Capcom Production Studio 3
- Publisher: Capcom
- Director: Yoshinori Takenaka
- Producers: Tatsuya Kitabayashi; Koji Nakajima
- Artist: Ryuji Higurashi
- Composers: Shinya Okada; Yuko Komiyama; Seiko Kobuchi
- Series: Mega Man X
- Platforms: GameCube, PlayStation 2
- Release: JP: July 29, 2004; NA: September 21, 2004; PAL: November 19, 2004
- Genre: Role-playing
- Mode: Single-player

Mega Man X: Command Mission (Note: Known in Japan as Rockman X: Command Mission (ロックマンXコマンドミッション, Rokkuman Ekkusu Komando Misshon)) is a 2004 role-playing video game developed by Capcom for the PlayStation 2 and GameCube. The game is a spin-off of the Mega Man X franchise. It was released in Japan on July 29, 2004, with releases in North America and PAL regions following in September and November.

Command Mission takes place in the 23rd century, when a metallic substance called Force Metal is discovered that revolutionizes engineering for Reploids, humanoid androids with human-level intelligence. When an assault on a Force Metal mining island occurs, a Maverick Hunter team led by the veteran hero X is sent out in response. Across the story, X forms a group to stand against the Mavericks, who are trying to use Force Metals. These characters are controlled in encounters involving parties of three characters who can use their own special techniques in order to defeat the enemies.

The game was developed by many of the team members who previously worked on Capcom's Breath of Fire series of role-playing games. According to the producer of Command Mission, a plot-focused role-playing game in the Mega Man X series was created because the series is well known for its action and storyline. In order to flesh out the game, characters were created to aid X and his fellow allies.

Command Mission was met with a mostly average critical response. Reviewers generally praised its battle system, comparing it to other role-playing games, but still felt its true potential was not realized. The plot was the subject of mixed responses for its short length and lack of depth in the supporting characters. Command Mission sold well.

As of September 2026, the PS2 version was announced to have a digital release on the PlayStation 4 and PlayStation 5 as part of the PlayStation Plus Premium, which was announced on the State of Play which was released on September 3 and was made available on September 15, as either part of the subscription or as an individual purchase.

== Gameplay ==
A boss battle in the game in which the player is using X's regular attack to damage the enemy. The bottom left shows the characters' health and the bottom right the order or turns.

Command Mission is a turn-based role-playing video game. The player progresses through the game's stages in order. The action is split between a field screen and a battle screen, with the player-character always in the center of the field of view. A map of the surrounding area is located in the bottom right-hand corner of the screen. The player spends their time primarily controlling the hero X who is joined by several characters when being attacked. The initial is linked to Central Tower where the group can rest. From here, the player transfers to the different Adventure Stages that follow the game's narrative. Previously completed Adventure Stages can be revisited, as well as ones vital to progressing through the story. Stages are spread around Giga City, which have to be cleared to progress through the story. Most of the time, the adventure stages are "empty", with enemies appearing randomly throughout the level. Besides common turn-based attacks, the playable characters have access to Hyper Mode which increases their powers for a limited amount of turns. Once a three-member team is formed, a Final Strike attack can be formed in which the team attacks the enemies together for a limited time.

The player comes across abandoned robots, collecting them enables the player to deploy robots to stages, where they search for money, information, data, or rare items. Some robots may require special parts in order to be used. Characters or enemies can be induced to enter different states of affliction that affect their performance during battle. The game features the appearance of Force Metals, special items that can equip the characters with several bonus effects. The energy that these metals exude may have unwanted side effects if the character is overloaded past Force Metal tolerance. They can only equip a certain number of Force Metals. Exceeding the amount they can equip may lead to them becoming rebellious random afflictions that negatively affect the characters. Some Force Metals may cancel out the side effects when equipped.

There are a few differences between the GameCube and PlayStation 2 versions of the game. The GameCube version makes use of the Nintendo GameCube Game Boy Advance Cable, which is used to connect a Game Boy Advance to the GameCube, enabling the use of a radar function to find secret items. A radar screen appears on the Game Boy Advance screen, showing the immediate area around the player, the direction the player is facing, and the location of any hidden items. The PlayStation 2 version features an unlockable demo of Mega Man X8.

== Plot ==
Mega Man X: Command Mission takes place during an unspecified year in the 23rd century, where mechanical beings known as Reploids coexist with humans. A substance known as Force Metal is extracted from the debris of a small meteorite, which revolutionizes the field of Reploid Engineering thanks to technology derived from it. An artificial island in the middle of an ocean built for the mining and smelting of Force Metal called Giga City is assaulted by a band of Reploids. Its leader, Epsilon, is branded a criminal Maverick by the government, and a Maverick Hunter team is dispatched by Colonel Redips to Giga City in order to liberate it from the grasp of Epsilon's Rebellion. X, Zero, and a Hunter named Shadow travel to the ruins. However, Shadow betrays the team, and Epsilon's cadre appears and knocks Zero away.

X escapes and finds himself in the resistance team. He encounters the bounty hunter Spider whom he joins forces to gather a resistance team to find Chief R to assist in defeating the minions of the Rebellion Army. The three find new allies, including Steel Massimo, a Reploid who is the successor of the former Massimo who was destroyed by the Rebellion Army; Nana, a navigator who was abducted by Epsilon's forces; Marino, a thief interested in targeting trade secrets; and Cinnamon, a Reploid capable of producing Force Metal. X also reunites with Zero and his other ally, Maverick Hunter Axl, who is searching for somebody who possesses his own copy abilities. Though Zero distrust X's new allies, Spider convinces him to join their cause. During the fight against the Rebellion Army, Spider presumably dies in the process. In another mission, X's forces defeat Epsilon who claims he needed the Metal to stand for his own misinterpreted ideals. After X defeats Epsilon, Colonel Redips' takes the Supra Force Metal and has his forces attack Giga City, killing Chief R. Redips had been manipulating both the Resistance and the Rebellion to obtain the power for himself.

As Redips battles X's forces, he is revealed to be the real Spider, having used the same powers as Axl to spy on the Maverick Hunters across the entire game. Redips overpowers the group, but one of Epsilon's underlings, Ferham, helps the group by removing part of the Force Metal from Redips. With Redips weakened, X's party is able to defeat him. A defeated Redips berates the heroes for their unwillingness to evolve using Supra-Force Metal before dying. Ferham appears holding the Supra-Force Metal and apologizes to X for all the trouble she caused before leaping off the elevator, planning to self-destruct and dying in the process. The elevator then begins to crumble, forcing them to get inside to survive the fall back to Earth. Meanwhile, Ferham destroys the Supra-Force Metal, creating a shower of aurora as it hits the atmosphere. In epilogue narration, it is revealed that, due to Colonel Redips' treason being unveiled to the public, Epsilon was posthumously cleared of his Maverick status, and peace returns to Giga City.

== Development and release ==
The main cast (from left to right): Marino, Axl, Massimo, Cinnamon, X, Spider, and Zero. Besides Axl, the other two returning heroes X and Zero, were given a different characterization while the new cast in order to add more variety.

Mega Man X: Command Mission was announced and presented by producer Koji Nakajima at the Tokyo Game Show in September 2003. Nakajima promised that action fans would still like Mega Man's new direction due to how they would handle the returning characters X and Zero. It was developed by Capcom Production Studio 3 and many of the team members that worked on Mega Man X7 and Breath of Fire: Dragon Quarter. Long-time producer and artist Keiji Inafune had always viewed the Mega Man X series in the action genre. He flatly refused when it was requested that he make it into a role-playing game. When asked why the team chose to make Mega Man X into one, producer Tatsuya Kitabayashi explained, "Mega Man X is respected as an action game, but also has a good story. So we've decided to focus on the story, which is why I'm creating an RPG based on Mega Man X." Kitabayashi considered Command Mission a sequel rather than a side story or the beginning of a new series because the plot is complete at the end of the game.

Based on their experience with the Breath of Fire series, the team created a new battle system for the game but found it difficult. "It's really difficult to create a battle mode system," Kitabayashi elaborated. "Mega Man has been about jumping and shooting in an action setting, so I needed to add a new system for this game. It was quite difficult to create something that is action-like but still has an RPG-like fighting mode." The new system was inspired by the Whack-a-mole game. When the game's production began, the Hyper Mode was exclusive to the playable characters X and Zero. However, because this gave them too much of an advantage over other party members, all other characters were given one Hyper Mode while X and Zero were given two each. This was mainly to balance the strengths of each party member, with Marino initially standing out. Putting some restrictions on healing made things more interesting for the Capcom designer. Depleting the energy of the character's subtanks means that there is no way to restore the player's health anymore, making the game system more challenging. Cross Orders are used to mark the pace, but since action games are all about being good at them, they tried to make that into the decisive factor. As a result, the Action Triggers of Zero and Axl can be upgraded across the game. The Final Strike system was decided by the number of playable characters and similarities with sentai-like works.

X's characterization was altered to give him a stronger persona now that he is a more iconic hero and leads several characters. In order to make him more appealing, the protagonist was also redesigned, as the artists found his classic look too plain. Ryuji Higurashi, a veteran artist of the Mega Man X series, acted as the game's chief character designer. When he learned that the game was to take place in the same time period as the Mega Man Zero series, Higurashi added several features to his designs for Command Mission to reflect their relationship. However, he was initially somewhat skeptical about the changes requested for the character X. Artist Keisuke Mizuno assisted Higurashi in the making of the visuals, most notably the 3D models. Up until its development, the Mega Man series has focused more on male characters on the battlefield, which led to the idea of including more female characters for a change. In regards to the antagonists, the narrative primarily explores the concept of how X and his allies face rebellious mechanical soldiers, Reploids, who become known as Maverick when they start causing crimes. Director Yoshinori Takenaka wanted to include moe elements in the cast and have two villains with different natures: the out-of-control Epsilon and the mastermind behind all, Redips. In Command Mission, the team wanted to make the narrative properly explore the characterization of each Maverick as they have their own reasons for their crimes, most notably due to the concept of Force Metal that the protagonists wield in combat and the overuse that can result in transforming them into Mavericks. The villain antagonist was pointed out by the staff to have his motives play such a role, but the final boss was instead a character who loses himself in the ending. The developers also decided not to include a New Game Plus option because the game is an RPG rather than an action game. Instead, they included incredibly difficult, secret bosses that were originally part of the storyline.

The game was released in Japan on July 29, 2004. The western port was first released in North America on September 21, 2004, and for PAL regions on November 19, 2004. The game's musical score was composed by Shinya Okada, Yuko Komiyama, and Seiko Kobuchi. A total of 58 tracks were compiled and released on a CD soundtrack by Suleputer in Japan on September 23, 2004. Asami Abe performed both the opening theme, "Jounetsu Setsuna" (情熱セツナ; lit. "A Moment of Passion"), and the closing theme, "Parts". The game was released in Japan on July 29, 2004; in North America on September 21, 2004; and for PAL regions on November 19, 2004. The North American PS2 version includes an unlockable demo version of Mega Man X8. On August 25, 2004, to coincide with the launch of the game in North America, NubyTech announced Mega Man-themed game controllers for both console versions. However, only the GameCube version of the controller arrived with the release of Mega Man X Collection in early 2006, while the PS2 version was canceled.

== Reception ==
Reception

Aggregate score
Aggregator	Score
Metacritic	67/100 (GCN); 69/100 (PS2)

Review scores
Publication	Score
1Up.com	C+
Famitsu	32/40
GamePro	3.5/5 (PS2)
GameSpot	7.2/10 (PS2, GCN)
GameSpy	3/5
IGN	8.4/10 (GCN); 8.3/10 (PS2)
Official Nintendo Magazine	71%
RPGamer	3.5/5
RPGFan	88/100

Command Mission received mixed reviews from critics. The PS2 version holds a 69 out of 100 on Metacritic, while the GameCube version holds a 67 out of 100, respectively. Official Nintendo Magazine claimed Command Mission was a decent RPG with an "interesting" universe; however, the staff found its genre too different from other entries in the Mega Man X series, which were platformers that required quick reflexes, and thus fans of the series used to the platform style would not enjoy it. The battle system was generally praised, with the concept of pressing combinations of buttons to pull off techniques or improve a technique's power said to be one of the game's highlights. A common complaint has been the short length and linearity of the game. Despite comparing the gameplay with the critically acclaimed Final Fantasy X role-playing game, 1UP.com felt the game still lacked the depths that made Final Fantasy X stand out. RPGamer had no problems with the gameplay system due to the customization of Metal Forces, balancing of healing items, and offensive attacks he compared with Shadow Hearts, but said the story would be better appreciated by returning gamers than casual gamers. RPGFan had mixed opinions in regards to the gameplay, praising the handling of the Hyper Mode and Metals as they can be appropriately used but criticizing the few healing items that are accessible, especially early in the game. One reviewer stated that the game was "too far on the easy side". Though reviewers liked the cel-shaded and colorful look of the game, Phil Theobald of GameSpy noted that "most of the environments tend to be rather bland and end up looking a lot alike." GamePro said there is no unique material in the gameplay, despite noting enjoyable puzzles.

In regards to the story, RPGamer found it "decent" based on pacing and twists, though he still found it more fitting for veterans. X was praised by GameSpy due to the series giving him a more elaborate storyline and characterizing him as a veteran. RPGFan regarded X, Zero, and Axel as some of the best-written characters in Command Mission but lamented that the supporting cast is not that engaging in comparison. 1UP.com criticized how early in the story Zero is removed from combat despite his fame, while the main story did not have a major impact on the reviewer. While finding the narrative too simple, GamePro believes the use of new and returning characters in the story has the potential to give X's story an alternative path to follow. The music was praised by RPGFan who still acknowledged the franchise has had better themes in the past and lamented the Japanese themes were not use in the English localization.

Comparing the versions, IGN and RPGamer criticized that the GameCube version has a much higher random encounter rate but also cited a smoother frame rate and marginal improvements in graphics. GameSpot called the GameCube version "a bit crisper." According to Famitsu, the PS2 version sold 36,635 units, making it the 312th best-selling game in the region for 2004. The GameCube version sold 18,599 units, making it the 460th best-selling game in Japan for that year. Battle system designer Togawa Yugo expressed a desire to create a sequel. This hypothetical "Command Mission 2" would have featured enemies visible on the field instead of random encounters. Both Den of Geek and Nintendo Life also listed Command Mission as one of the best games in the entire franchise. Nintendo Life also listed it as a game they would like on the Switch.

The character of Spider confused several gamers due to having the power of transforming into other Reploids with the final boss Redips being the man behind him despite Spider being a playable character since early parts of the plot. As players wonder whether Spider was his own character once or not, Capcom had to clarify Redips was always using the Spider persona to manipulate X's team.
