= Mega Man X8 =

2004 video game

- North American box art
- Developer: Capcom Production Studio 1
- Publisher: Capcom
- Director: Eiro Shirahama
- Designer: Hiroyuki Yamato
- Programmer: Sotaro Arakawa
- Artist: Tatsuya Yoshikawa
- Writers: Makoto Ikehara; Kohsuke Nasu
- Composers: Yuko Komiyama; Naoto Tanaka; Shinya Okada
- Platforms: PlayStation 2, Windows
- Release: PlayStation 2: NA: December 7, 2004; EU: February 11, 2005; JP: March 10, 2005; Windows: JP: March 10, 2005; EU: September 21, 2005
- Genre: Platform
- Mode: Single-player

Mega Man X8 (Note: Known in Japan as Rockman X8 (ロックマンX8, Rokkuman Ekkusueito)) is a 2004 platform game developed by Capcom for the PlayStation 2. It is the eighth and final game in the Mega Man X series. It was first released in North America on December 7, 2004. The PS2 version, as well as a Windows iteration, were released in Japan and Europe the following year. Although Mega Man X8 uses 3D graphics like Mega Man X7, the development team chose not to opt for 3D gameplay, instead opting for sidescrolling action.

The plot of Mega Man X8 focuses on the abduction of a next-generation "Reploid" from the construction site of a space elevator, and the subsequent pursuit of his captors. During the course of game play the motivations of these captors comes into focus, and it is up to the heroes of "Maverick Hunters", led by X, to stop them. The gameplay of Mega Man X8 is similar to the other games in the series, in which the player must complete a series of stages. Defeating their bosses will earn special weapons or abilities for each of the playable characters.

The game was met with a mixed critical reception. While the visual presentation was praised for improving on Mega Man X7's, the gameplay was met with mixed reviews in regards to length and execution, including its difficulty and the character balancing between X, Zero and Axl, and its story was criticized. Despite Mega Man X8 being considered an improvement over X6 and X7, the Mega Man X series went on hiatus due to the game's low sales. On December 16, 2015, it was released on PlayStation Network in Japan. It was released for Nintendo Switch, PlayStation 4, Windows, and Xbox One on July 24, 2018, worldwide and July 26, 2018, in Japan as a part of Mega Man X Legacy Collection 2.

== Plot ==
The story is set during the year 21XX. The "Maverick" Reploid rebellions across the past years continue, seemingly with no possible solution. To escape these troubles, mankind has begun the next generation of research and development by constructing an orbital elevator able to take equipment and handwork to the moon, which they seek to colonize. This operation is labeled the "Jakob Project", with the orbital elevator bearing its name, and a Reploid named Lumine is placed in charge of the project. These New Generation Reploids are able to use D.N.A. data to change their shapes. They are the perfect workers because they can change their shapes according to a task, and have subroutines built in to prevent them from going Maverick.

Everything seems to be running smoothly until Vile, returning from his defeat in Mega Man X3, kidnaps Lumine for unknown reasons. It becomes the Maverick Hunters' mission to rescue him. However, what the Hunters do not know is that Sigma has returned. Contained in every single new-generation Reploid's copy chip is Sigma's own D.N.A., meaning that the next-generation 'Maverick-Proof' Reploids are in fact able to go Maverick. Sigma seeks to destroy the "old generation" in favor of his "children".

When Sigma is defeated in his Lunar palace, Lumine steps in to reveal himself as the true mastermind behind recent events. He gloats to the Hunters that in order for evolution to take its course, he and his fellow new-generation Reploids must destroy both humans and "obsolete" Reploids. After a massive battle, Lumine is defeated. When Axl walks up to Lumine's body however, he is struck unconscious as a tentacle springs from it and damages the crystal on his head. As the three different characters ride back down the Jakob Elevator, Zero wonders what Sigma's defeat means for his future battles, while X ponders Lumine's words on evolution. Axl is still out cold, but his shattered crystal can be seen glowing with a tiny fragment of a crystal shard.

The ending excerpt revealed that although the production of new-generation Reploids with copy chips has been stopped, demand for the new-generation Reploids themselves has not dwindled due to the rapid development of space, and years later the production for copy chips resumed, despite criticisms from historians.

== Gameplay ==
Gameplay of Mega Man X8 featuring X is in 2.5D style with Axl as his ally.

Overall gameplay in Mega Man X8 is mostly similar to previous Mega Man X games and has removed the 3D style from Mega Man X7 in favor of a 2.5D style, although 2 of the stages, namely "Central White" and "Dynasty", are fully 3D. After an introductory stage, Mega Man X8 presents the player with a choice of 8 stages, with a Maverick robot serving as the stage boss. After defeating the 8 bosses, a series of fortress stages open up for the player to complete in linear progression until the final boss is defeated. The difficulty chosen makes an impact in regards to the size of the health bar and if other items can be used.

The player starts the game with access to three playable characters: X, a shooter able to wear multiple armors that can be found hidden in the stages; Axl, a shooter able to transform into enemies; and Zero, a sword fighter able to double jump. Additionally, Zero can equip additional weapons that can be purchased at the store such as hammers and additional swords after finding a certain Rare Force Metal for it, excluding one of the weapons which is only available for purchase upon completing the game with Zero or entering the code in the title screen of the PlayStation 2 version. X8 introduces new mechanics to the game; the first is Guard Break, which can break enemy defenses when enemies are attacked with certain weapons. The second is Double Attack, where the playable character and the chosen partner character perform a screen-filling attack that causes heavy damage to all enemies on screen. Additionally, X's new armor, the Neutral Armor, can be customized with parts that can either form two new armors, or mixed together for different effects.

Two characters can be selected to go to a stage, while a navigator can be assigned to assist the player. Depending on the navigator's qualities, the character will be informed about the stages' hidden paths or boss weaknesses. In every stage, the characters can obtain items that can be used in a shop to buy upgrades called chips. The three navigators can be unlocked as playable characters, taking moves from the Maverick Hunters. Much like X7, New Game Plus is also available in this game. One of these features is content unlocked under certain conditions from the previous game or by entering a secret code on the title screen of the PlayStation 2 version and then starting the game on Normal or Hard. One example is the three navigators can be unlocked as the playable characters by buying chips in the store after completing this requirement. In addition Cut Man as portrayed in the first Mega Man game can be found as a hidden boss by either having a save file for the PS2 version of Mega Man X Command Mission on the Memory Card or through one of the codes.

== Development ==
Mega Man X8 was developed by Capcom Production Studio 1. During development, the main theme was "returning to roots" by stripping away complicated elements that had been added to the series over time, in an attempt to make this game feel more like the first Mega Man X. The game's direct predecessor, Mega Man X7, was the first entry in the Mega Man X series to feature full 3D graphics, as well as 3D gameplay. However, as stated by Capcom producer and original Mega Man illustrator Keiji Inafune, the development team chose not to pursue 3D gameplay for Mega Man X8 simply because of its graphical style. Inafune himself was not involved in the production of Mega Man X8, although the game's art designers did consult with him before changing the overall style of the characters. The game's main illustrator, Tatsuya Yoshikawa, was an assistant in X7 and took a bigger role. He was responsible for designing the protagonists, the Maverick bosses, and the newer ancillary cast. Yoshikawa took into account what the characters may resemble if they were toys, and even imitated the joints of Revoltech figures. Similar to his previous work in X7, Yoshikawa wanted the designs to pander to his feelings about the first Mega Man X game while still following his own ideas too. The three main characters were revised for Mega Man X8 as Yoshikawa planned to give them more unique features to contrast their personalities. The new antagonist, Lumine, was given a human-like face rather Reploid to symbolize the concept of a new generation of Reploids. To contrast Lumine's his angel-like appearance, Sigma was instead made to look like a demon. The PS2 game was released in North America on December 7, 2004, in Europe on February 11, 2005 and in Japan on March 10, 2005.

A Windows port was released in Japan on March 10, 2005, and in Europe on September 21, 2005. The Windows version of Mega Man X8 was released in Asia, Europe, and as a download from GameStop in North America. This version can run in windowed mode, in addition to full-screen, and includes mouse and keyboard features, although it does support using a controller. The Windows version also features several languages and the possibility to toggle between Japanese and English voices, which can be changed from the main menu or after starting a new game. All of the music and cut-scene dialogue is encoded in Ogg Vorbis format. The musical score for Mega Man X8 was co-composed by Yuko Komiyama, Naoto Tanaka, and Shinya Okada. The 51-song Rockman X8 Original Soundtrack was released in Japan on April 13, 2005, by Suleputer. The Japanese opening theme for PlayStation 2 (also available for PC platform in any regional version, including Europe which had received the North American opening theme in the European PlayStation 2 version) is "Wild Fang" by Janne Da Arc; the band had previously done television advertisement themes for Mega Man Battle Network and Mega Man Battle Network 2. However, the theme was not included in the soundtrack and was even omitted on the game's localization in English for PS2 platform.

It became available for Windows via Steam, PlayStation 4, Xbox One, and Nintendo Switch as a part of Mega Man X Legacy Collection 2 on July 24, 2018, worldwide and on July 26, 2018, in Japan.

== Reception ==
Reception

Aggregate score
Aggregator	Score
Metacritic	68/100

Review scores
Publication	Score
Electronic Gaming Monthly	6.5/10, 6.5/10, 7/10
Famitsu	8/10, 8/10, 7/10, 7/10
Game Informer	8.3/
GameSpot	6.3/10
GameSpy	3.5/5
IGN	7.3/10

Mega Man X8 received a generally mixed response based on the 68 score from Metacritic. It was generally praised for returning to a more classic style of Mega Man gameplay and removing the criticized gameplay elements of Mega Man X7. IGN praised the game for its mixture of 2D and 3D, and its camera system, saying "Thankfully the transition from one plane to another is pretty seamless and isn't the bothersome chore that switches in X7 were. It's an easy and totally acceptable gameplay method and one that should have been used in 2003 to begin with." In comparing the characters, IGN found X and Axl to be the most skilled especially due to how easy is it to find the former's upgrade for his armor but still found the system lacking when compared with Capcom's action game Devil May Cry 3: Dante's Awakening. Although GameSpy praised the improvements of the gameplay as well as the contrast between the three protagonists, the site still felt it had no innovation. GameZone criticized the game design for X's perceived weakness compared to the more useful weaponry of Zero and Axl, while also claiming that most stages lack enough appeal to revisit. Electronic Gaming Monthly criticized the 3D stages, but praised the 2D stages for their difficulty and replay value.

Though the narrative was criticized, the visual presentation was still praised when compared with previous games. GameSpot criticized the game for its level design, which often made the game extremely frustrating to play. They also derided the story, remarking that it "dabbles in a lot of nonsensical anime-style ramblings about things that are of little importance to the actual game." 1UP.com called the story of X8 "dry as a bone" but noted the presentation was well executed despite its short length. Gaming Age liked the choice of three playable characters and the opportunities for teamwork. They also praised the graphics, but found the difficulty frustrating and claimed that the story did not amount to much. While GameSpy appreciates whether or not the player can be assisted by navigator, he still called the main story "bad cyberpunk nonsense".

According to Famitsu, Mega Man X8 was the tenth-best-selling game in Japan during its week of release at 14,927 units. A total of 35,546 units were sold in the region by the end of 2005.
