= Mega Man X7 =

2003 video game

- North American cover art featuring (from left to right) Zero, X and Axl.
- Developer: Capcom Production Studio 3
- Publisher: Capcom
- Producer: Tatsuya Kitabayashi
- Designers: Tsutomo Teranishi; Hiroyuki Yamato; Akiteru Naka; Takanori Uegaki; Koji Ohkohara
- Artist: Tatsuya Yoshikawa
- Composers: Yuko Komiyama; Shinya Okada; Seiko Kobuchi; Naoto Tanaka; Makoto Asai; Teruo Konishi; Shuichi Mizuhata; Noriyuki Iwadare; Takuya Miyawaki
- Series: Mega Man X
- Platform: PlayStation 2
- Release: JP: July 17, 2003; NA: October 14, 2003; EU: March 5, 2004
- Genres: Platform, third-person shooter
- Mode: Single-player

Mega Man X7 (Note: Known in Japan as Rockman X7 (ロックマンX7, Rokkuman Ekkususebun)) is a 2003 platform game developed by Capcom for the PlayStation 2. It is the seventh main game in the Mega Man X series and the first in the series to appear on the sixth generation of gaming consoles. Mega Man X7 was first released in Japan on July 17, 2003, with North American and European releases following in October 2003 and March 2004 respectively. The European version features a redrawn logo also used for future releases in the region. It was also released as part of Mega Man X Legacy Collection 2 on July 24, 2018 for the worldwide release and July 26, 2018 for Japan, whose Windows version was released internationally via Steam along with PlayStation 4, Xbox One and Nintendo Switch.

Mega Man X7 takes place in the 22nd century. Daily human life is often disrupted by "Maverick" crime from the "Reploid" robots that live and work among them. The heroic "Maverick Hunter" X has retired from the battlefield. As such, various groups have begun springing up to stamp out the ever constant threat of Maverick activity. Axl, a member of "Red Alert", questions his group's methods and deserts the team, only to be pursued by its leader, Red. While Axl and returning hero Zero are initially playable, X later joins the team. Like other games in the series, Mega Man X7 in which the player fights through an octet of selectable stages. The game differs from previous side-scrolling entries by featuring fully 3D graphics intermixed with both 3D and 2D gameplay.

The development of Mega Man X7 involved a challenging transition of the well-known Mega Man X characters into 3D. However, Mega Man X7 received lackluster reviews and sold poorly. Reviewers found the game's foray into the third dimension well-intended but poorly executed, criticising its camera and controls. The game was also criticized for its English voice acting and X's minimal role, including the impossibility to play as him until the requirements to unlock him are met. Because of these, X7 is considered to be the worst game in the Mega Man X series.

== Plot ==
The game takes place after previous installments as intelligent robots known as Reploids work diligently to rebuild civilization after several parts of the planet were destroyed by the Mavericks. Growing weary of the seemingly never-ending Maverick Wars, Mega Man X decides to retire in search of more peaceful solutions, leaving his partner Zero in charge. In X's absence, Maverick activity rapidly begins to rise, which leads to the formation of an unsanctioned anti-Maverick vigilante group known as Red Alert. As the group grows more and more reckless, one of their members, a new generation Reploid prototype named Axl, decides to defect. Red, the group's leader, is angered by his underling Axl deserting them and goes on a rampage to get him back.

Axl is chased through a city by a mechaniloid sent by Red Alert to retrieve him, and the ensuing chaos draws the attention of Zero. After a battle against the mechaniloid, Zero arrests Axl and takes him to the Maverick Hunter headquarters. In response, Red issues a challenge to the Hunters: he will release some Mavericks that Red Alert has in captivity, and whichever group can defeat the Mavericks first will gain possession of Axl. Zero goes into action without hesitation, and Axl's remorse for what he has done fuels his desire to become a Maverick Hunter. As Zero and Axl battle Red Alert, Axl reveals that he possesses the ability to copy the D.N.A. of other Reploids, making him invaluable to Red. X initially stays out of the conflict, feeling that it is pointless, but later joins in hoping to end the war quickly. Elsewhere, Red communicates with a mysterious figure known as "The Professor," who gives him additional power and shows him what Axl's copy ability can do. The Professor then takes possession of Red Alert, and orders Red to retrieve Axl.

Following the defeat of the Mavericks, the Hunters infiltrate Crimson Palace, the home base of Red Alert. There they defeat a reluctant Red and discover a rebuilt Sigma, who was behind Red Alert's corruption. Despite the Hunters defeating Sigma twice, he rises once again and tries to kill Axl. Axl uses his powers to appear to Sigma that he was Red and then blasts him out of a window from the top of the palace. Should X defeat Sigma, his superiors ask him to train Axl to join their ranks, which is once again explored in Axl's ending. On the other hand, Zero's ending involves a dream where he is antagonized by X who wishes to kill all Mavericks.

== Gameplay ==
Example of Axl's gameplay which allows the player to choose which enemy to shoot

Mega Man X7 is the first of the two games in the series to have 3D gameplay in addition to the standard 2D style. Similar to previous installments, the players must go through an early introduction stage, and then complete eight stages to defeat boss characters and obtain new powers from them. Chips must be used immediately after they are gained and cannot be deactivated, nor changed from one playable character to another. Once all the chips for that playable character are completely maxed out, that particular character can no longer receive any more chip upgrades and obtain supporting items for the health and weaponry. The game also has a New Game Plus feature, by completing the game and saving it, and then starting a new game from loading that particular save file. This feature allows for X to become available after the opening stage with any collected armor parts kept and all the chip upgrades from the previous game are retained.

When starting the game, the player has only access to returning Maverick Hunter Zero, a Reploid who fights with a saber, and newcomer Axl who uses three different types of guns. The player can send the two characters to the same stage and both can be changed whenever the player needs to. Based on the player's performance, the characters are given ranks across each mission. While Zero and X retain their common weaponry from previous games, Axl has a new ability called "Copy Shot". If the player destroys certain types of enemies with said technique, they will leave an item upon their destruction. If the item (a glowing red sphere) is picked up, Axl will transform into a copy of the enemy he destroyed, with all of its features (speed, weapon, etc.). In order to unlock the returning hero X, the player must rescue 64 reploids (out of a possible total of 128) or defeat the eight main bosses in order to unlock him. Unlike previous games, X can air dash and fully charge his buster by default. Armor capsules from Dr. Light also return, and after obtaining the full set, the player can choose between unarmored X or armored X on the Stage Select. An auto-aim feature is added for both Axl and X allowing the player to lock on to enemies. The target can be changed by pressing a dedicated button. While Zero does not have any standard long-range attacks, his ability to destroy projectiles with his Z-Saber from past games was replaced to repel projectiles instead to help compensate for this weakness.

== Development ==
Mega Man X7 was developed by a team of about 30 people, led by producers Tatsuya Minami and Tatsuya Kitabayashi of Capcom Production Studio 3. This was the first game in the Mega Man series worked on by Kitabayashi. He explained that transitioning the character models of Mega Man X from 2D to 3D graphics was a challenge, but that including both 2D and 3D gameplay was not, as they had planned to have them in equal amounts for the game. The development team took into account the less-than-favorable reception for Mega Man X6, but instead of simply trying to make the next game new and fresh with 3D graphics, they decided to focus on "getting 3D right". The team also attempted to build upon the action-style gameplay for which the Mega Man franchise is known along with the more adult-themed storyline of the Mega Man X series. This involved adding the newer, non-traditional character Axl to deepen and better the narrative. Kitabayashi emphasized, "He's young, he's running away. He's like the new younger character of the group, and that's why I wanted to put him in there." Minami stated in an interview that the game would feature multiplayer for up to two players. However, the final version of the game lacks this option.

Prominent Mega Man artist and Capcom producer Keiji Inafune had little involvement in the Mega Man X series after the fifth installment. His only contribution to Mega Man X7 was lending advice to the illustrators on creating the new protagonist Axl. Inafune had been careful to make X and Zero unique when he originally designed them, and he wanted to give Axl the same treatment. Yoshikawa designed Axl to look both as a youth and as a robot with a dark aura which led to his black armor. Red was inspired by the concept of the Grim Reaper. The game's primary artist, Tatsuya Yoshikawa, signed on when the project was well underway. He decided to take after his predecessor Haruki Suetsugu for the direction in which to design the characters. Yoshikawa thought the team would have to create "polygon friendly" bosses, but decided to stick to the traditional design concepts set forth by the early Mega Man X games. As the series had finally transitioned into 3D, Yoshikawa also expected the team to rethink the way the game was made as they had done in the first Mega Man X title. Inafune stated, "My personal opinion was that 3D is simply a graphical style, and just because a game is going 3D like X7 was, it doesn't mean we 'have to' make it a 3D game." Suegutsu's work from Mega Man X6 also served as the basis for other illustrations by Yoshikawa.

The musical score for Mega Man X7 was composed by nine individuals. A 46-song soundtrack was released by Suleputer in Japan on October 1, 2003. The game's opening theme, "Code Crush", is performed by Rina Aiuchi. The ending theme is "Lazy Mind", performed by Showtaro Morikubo, the voice actor for X in the Japanese games. A CD single for each of the songs was released in Japan on July 20, 2003 and August 6, 2003 respectively. It became available for Windows via Steam, PlayStation 4, Xbox One, and Nintendo Switch as a part of Mega Man X Legacy Collection 2 on July 24, 2018, worldwide and on July 26, 2018, in Japan.

== Reception ==
Reception

Aggregate score
Aggregator	Score
Metacritic	58/100

Review scores
Publication	Score
Electronic Gaming Monthly	5.33/10
Famitsu	28/40
Game Informer	7.5/10
GamePro	3/5
GameRevolution	D+
GameSpot	6.5/10
GameSpy	2/5
IGN	6.7/10
Official U.S. PlayStation Magazine	6/10

Mega Man X7 debuted on Japanese sales charts as the third best-selling video game at 52,420 copies. By its second week on sale, the game had sold 71,739 copies in the region and by its third week, 89,775 copies. Media Create sales data lists the game as having sold 111,778 copies by the end of 2003 in Japan. A budget re-release of the game was included alongside the PlayStation versions of the first six original Mega Man games as part of the Rockman Collection in Japan on December 19, 2003.

Mega Man X7 received mixed reviews. The game attracted some positive remarks for the character switching and Reploid rescue systems. However, critics found that the game's mixture of 2D and 3D gameplay was well-intentioned but poorly executed, with GameSpy finding the controls to be challenging to handle. IGN found the characters unbalanced, as the shooters X and Axl felt far more useful than the melee fighter Zero. Despite liking the switching, GamePro found enemy interaction to be poorly executed, especially the handling of Axl's auto-target. Official U.S. PlayStation Magazine believed the game could have been more appealing had the developers focused more on improving Zero and Axl's fighting skills in a 2D rather than 3D system. GameRevolution liked the Reploid system for letting players enhance their characters through chips, as they found the gameplay challenging. Critics also had a negative response to X's lack of early inclusion in Mega Man X7, with Axl being considered a poorly designed substitute.

In particular, critics commented that the camera and controls did not translate well from 2D to 3D. Criticism has been aimed at the English voice actors' performance, to the point that it was recommended to try listening to the original Japanese audio. The music was described as generic and, while appealing, not standing out against what previous installments have offered. The GameSpy review concluded by saying: "I can't fault Capcom or the MMX7 team for trying to reinvent a series that had obviously completely lost its way... [but] the flaccid 2D sections in this game aren't half as good as any of the levels in the original Mega Man X. The 3D bits are more compelling, but still substandard." IGN instead placed the blame wholly on the 3D sections: "We can't help but think that Mega Man X7 would have been better-suited staying 2D. But until Capcom realizes that the better action-oriented 3D titles allow you to manipulate the camera whole-heartedly, future installments of the series will likely run into the same problems that this one did."

In a retrospective article involving the franchise's worst games, 1UP.com included Mega Man X7 citing "usual 3D design issues" and the titular character requiring to be unlocked as the game's flaws. GamesRadar compared it with the similarly poor received Castlevania for the Nintendo 64 due to how both games tried staying away from their predecessors' formula by adding 3D gameplay and the transition failed to gamers.
