= Mega Man X Collection =

- PlayStation 2 cover art
- Developer: Capcom
- Publisher: Capcom Entertainment
- Series: Mega Man X
- Platforms: GameCube, PlayStation 2
- Release: NA: January 10, 2006
- Genres: Action, platform
- Mode: Single-player

Mega Man X Collection is a compilation of video games developed by Capcom. Released on January 10, 2006, exclusively in North America for GameCube and PlayStation 2, Mega Man X Collection contains the first six games in the Mega Man X series, which originated on the Super Nintendo Entertainment System and made its way primarily onto various 32-bit consoles. All six games are action platformers in which the player traverses a series of stages and gains the special weapons of defeated bosses.

In addition to these games, Mega Man X Collection includes unlockable artwork and music relating to the series, as well as Mega Man: Battle & Chase, a racing game based on the original Mega Man series that was previously unreleased in North America. The compilation is a follow-up to Mega Man Anniversary Collection, another compilation of eight games in the original Mega Man series previously released on both platforms and the Xbox. Critical reception for Mega Man X Collection has been average to fairly positive. Reviews have noted it as a competent portfolio of games of varying quality, but have expressed negative comments regarding its lack of additional content.

== Overview ==
Included games
1993	Mega Man X
1994	Mega Man X2
1995	Mega Man X3
1996
1997	Mega Man X4
1997	Mega Man: Battle & Chase
1998
1999
2000	Mega Man X5
2001	Mega Man X6

Mega Man X Collection was first announced by Capcom Production Studio 1 producer Tatsuya Minami on February 1, 2005. The anthology was formally announced by Capcom's North American division on May 18, 2005, with a projected release date for that autumn. "Building upon the success of Mega Man Anniversary Collection, Capcom now delivers an even more incredible compilation of games from our premiere video game icon," stated Capcom's director of marketing Todd Thorson. "The Mega Man X series of games has revolutionized the long standing Mega Man franchise. Combining them in a comprehensive package is simply a fantastic value." Mega Man X Collection was showcased at Electronic Entertainment Expo that summer, but was not released until January 10, 2006.

Mega Man X Collection contains the first six games in the Mega Man X series. Mega Man X and Mega Man X2 are based on their appearances on the SNES. Mega Man X3, also originally on the SNES, is based on its update for the PlayStation, Sega Saturn, and PC (of which only the PC version saw North American release). The remaining three games are based on their PlayStation renditions, though the Japanese voice tracks for the cutscenes in Mega Man X6 were removed for the collection. All of the games now use save files, including the first few titles that originally used passwords only, though upon loading save data, the player is still greeted with the old, fully functional password entry screen, complete with the correct password to access the saved game. Mega Man: Battle & Chase is a game that is unlocked after completing the first three games. It is a classic series kart racing game previously unreleased in North America. Mega Man X Collection also contains unlockable artwork and music. Unlike Mega Man Anniversary Collection, which had different unlockable content depending on the version, the PlayStation 2 and GameCube versions are identical.

== Reception ==
Reception

Aggregate scores
Aggregator	Score
GameRankings	GCN: 76.8% PS2: 75.12%
Metacritic	GCN: 75 out of 100; PS2: 73 out of 100

Review scores
Publication	Score
1Up.com	B−
Computer Games Magazine	4/5
G4	3/5
GameSpot	7.2/10
IGN	7/10

Critical reviews for Mega Man X Collection have been generally positive or average. GameSpot gave the compilation a 7.2/10 and praises the first two Mega Man X games, saying they "are just about on par with some of the better games in the original Mega Man series". However, they comment that X5 and X6 "just aren't very good at all". They conclude by saying the compilation "will please the series' longtime fans, and serves as a good primer for those who never had the opportunity to check out these games back in the day". IGN gave the compilation a 7/10, stating "While its overall game quality and list of extras isn't nearly as consistent or flashy as its Mega Man cousin, there's still a lot to like".

== See also ==
- Mega Man X Legacy Collection, a subsequent compilation of the Mega Man X series
