= Mega Man X Dive =

2020 video game

Mega Man X DiVE
- Developer: Capcom Taiwan
- Publishers: Capcom Taiwan (Asia), Capcom (Japan), NebulaJoy (other regions)
- Producers: Hideto Yoda (Asian version), Kenichi Hashimoto (Japanese version)
- Artist: Keisuke Mizuno
- Composer: Yuko Komiyama
- Platforms: iOS, Android Windows
- Release: Original Asia: March 24, 2020; Oceania: March 26, 2020; Japan: October 26, 2020; North American/European version: August 16, 2021 Mega Man X Dive Offline WW: September 1, 2023
- Genre: Action role-playing
- Mode: Co-op mode; multiplayer; single-player

Mega Man X DiVE (Note: Known in Japan as Rockman X DiVE (ロックマンX DiVE, Rokkuman Ekkusu Daivu)) was a 2020 mobile game developed and published by Capcom, primarily by its Taiwan-based staff. It is a 2D action game using 3D models, featuring abilities from previous games in the series such as wall-kicking, dashing, dash-jumping, and Ride Armor operation. Originally released only for mobile devices, the game was ported to Steam, iOS, and Android in September 2023 under the new title Mega Man X Dive Offline.

The original Mega Man X DiVE ended its global service on July 30, 2024.

== Gameplay ==
First Armor X (middle) in one of the Jakob levels

Cooperative play and competitive play are multiplayer modes, while other game modes are single-player. Initially, only the story mode (normal) can be selected, but as the player level increases, additional modes become available. Multiplayer elements, such as competitive play, cooperative play, raid bosses, and the DNA portal, were discontinued when the online version of the app ended.

Story mode involves conquering stages similarly to previous games in the series. Each stage is divided into six parts, with a boss character appearing every third part. There are items throughout the stage that will temporarily increase player stats, and players will receive rewards based on the number of items collected. The item "Deep Element," is placed within these stages. There are also "normal" and "hard" versions of each stage, each featuring different content and placements of enemies and items. Once players clear a stage, they can retry it as many times as they like. If they meet all the specified conditions and complete the stage, they can "skip dive" to receive clear rewards without having to replay the stage, though the stamina cost persists.

In Challenge Boss, players fight only boss characters that have appeared in other modes. "Skip Dive" is also available under the same conditions as in story mode. In Time Attack, players compete against three randomly selected opponents for the clear time of a stage chosen from the story mode. Target stages and competing players change daily.

In DNA Portal (online version only), players can use special stamina to traverse the map. The amount of stamina recovered varies depending on the player's hunter program and weapon registration. In this mode, programs, weapons, and traversed maps will be reset.

In Event, players conquer special stages with specific objectives, such as enemy defeat rates and time attacks. Rewards can be obtained based on the goal achievement rate. Limited-time event stages may appear; "Skip Dive" is also possible, but in this mode, players do not have to meet the specified conditions; instead, they need a special consumable item. The offline version adds several missions from past events, including seasonal special events similar to the online version, which have been modified to become playable once a certain player level is reached. Cooperative play (online version only) allows players to complete one stage simultaneously. All stage configurations are exclusive to this mode.

In Battle (online version only), players compete against each other online. Each player has three remaining lives within a stage that spans several horizontal and vertical screens, and the side that loses all its remaining lives is defeated. There are free competitions as well as those for players aiming for top rankings.

Raid Boss (online version only) also functions as a limited-time event. When the cumulative damage inflicted by all players on a server reaches a certain threshold, the boss will be defeated, and all players who contributed damage will receive a defeat reward. After defeating the boss, players will proceed to the next round, but the cumulative damage required for defeat will increase with each consecutive round.

== Premise ==
The game recapitulates the story from the Mega Man series, with the player as the main character, controlling protagonist X as the first playable character. It features several original characters, such as ViA and RiCO, whose characterizations are revealed throughout the story. The player, due in part to some corrupted data known as the Maverick Data, gets transported into the Deep Log, a massive database containing data on every Mega Man game. They must progress through the scrambled code of the Maverick Wars, Elf Wars, and the Game of Destiny to destroy the Maverick Data, which is causing the gradual corruption of the Deep Log.

== Development ==
The original plan was initiated by Capcom Taiwan, and after receiving approval from Capcom in Japan, the project began development around March 2018. In addition to Capcom Taiwan, illustrations and 3D animations were produced by Capcom Japan. The original character RiCO was newly designed by Keisuke Mizuno, who also supervised all 2D illustrations and 3D models of other characters. Supervision and quality control related to the intellectual property were thoroughly checked by their team in Osaka.

Returning to the original story, the producers and directors at Capcom Taiwan enjoyed the series and believed the online game would be appealing. While the game was conceived as a Mega Man X title, the staff stated that there would be "endless" possibilities. This game marks Capcom Taiwan's inaugural venture into developing original titles. At that time, Yoda Hideto was residing in Taiwan and had a deep affinity for the series. He took the initiative to connect with the producer of Mega Man in Japan and negotiated to create a Mega Man game in Taiwan. They started the project around May 2018 and completed it nearly two years and ten months later.

The project began with the idea of developing a smartphone game that focuses on the action elements of the series, so it does not replicate the original gameplay. All actions are executed through the player's hands. The team received a great deal of feedback, which they considered while making balance adjustments before releasing the Japanese version. Hashimoto believes there is nothing comparable to this level of side-scrolling action on a smartphone, and he hopes that players from the original generation will rediscover its appeal while also attracting younger fans. Nakayama, known for his work on Mega Man Zero, provided additional assistance. Mizuno particularly enjoyed working as an artist due to his desire to produce more Mega Man X games. The character χ-kai started as an April Fool's gag related to the regular X but ultimately became a fully developed character with his own characterization.

Original characters were requested by Yoda. The team worked to express their personalities and characteristics through their designs. RiCO and ViA were among the hardest characters to develop in order to fit the series. Mizuno was pleased with the positive response RiCO received from the audience, especially given the challenges of portraying a heroine who did not fit the mold at first.

Previous characters were designed with sprites in mind, which meant that several of them lacked a rear view, images of the soles of their feet, or weapons. In addition to creating new characters, Mizuno designed new armors for X and Zero. He encountered no issues with X, as the artist was able to take advantage of the hardware's capabilities. In contrast, Zero's design required careful consideration to retain his iconic appearance, while X's simpler design allowed for the inclusion of various armors in all of his appearances.

Mega Man X DiVE is developed by Capcom Taiwan, with the Capcom head office in Japan responsible for design supervision and quality control checks. The game was released in parts of East and Southeast Asia on March 24, 2020, and in Australia and India on March 26, 2020. Jun sang the theme song "Recognize" for the online version, but it could not be used due to multiple factors, leading him to create a new version based on his own ideas.

As the online version approached its shutdown, Asada, a seasoned producer with extensive experience in numerous games, was brought in to oversee the offline version. The offline version was released on September 1, 2023. Service for the Japan and Asia online versions ended at 13:00 on September 27, 2023. The offline version does not carry over play data from the online version and is treated as an independent game. Compatible devices include iOS, Android, and PC (Steam). Asada suggested using a controller for the Steam version. All characters from the online version were carried over, excluding the Capcom collaboration characters from Monster Hunter, Street Fighter, and Devil May Cry. It is a one-time purchase game, offering all the original content upon purchase.

== Reception ==
While the gameplay and visuals were praised, players felt that the multiplayer modes did not properly honor the franchise, to the extent that Mega Man X DiVE did not feel like a true Mega Man game. Despite preferring a sequel rather than DiVE, players appreciated the accessibility of the story but had mixed feelings about the customization required to level up and whether the stages were appropriately designed.

In Capcom's financial report for the quarter ending December 31, 2020, mobile content sales increased by 80.7% year-over-year. This boost is attributed to Mega Man X DiVE and the mainland China release of Street Fighter Duel. Both titles contributed to a rise in mobile revenue of 4.7 billion yen, or approximately US$45 million.

Regarding the offline version, Joel Couture of Siliconera rated it 9 out of 10, praising it as a good adaptation of the original product for retaining most of the original content and its focus on single-player mode. However, he criticized the story mode for being too short and noted that the difficulty might be too challenging for newcomers if they do not follow the rules properly.
