= Galore =

Galore may refer to:

== Albums ==
- Galore (The Cure album), 1997
- Galore (Dragonette album), 2007
- Galore (Kirsty MacColl album), 1995
- Galore (The Primitives album), 1991
- Galore (Thumpers album), 2014

== EPs ==
- Galore (House of Protection EP), 2024

== Other uses ==
- Galore (novel), a 2009 novel by Michael Crummey
- Galore (film), a 2013 Australian drama film
- Galore, New South Wales, a village in Australia

== See also ==
- Galore Galore, a 2007 album by alternative rock band Sponge
- Pussy Galore, a character in James Bond novels and films
