= Hadouken =

Special attack in the Street Fighter series of fighting video games

Simple drawing of a stick figure performing a Hadouken. Shown from left to right: charge and release.

The Hadouken or Hadoken (波動拳, Hadōken; IPA: [hadoːkẽꜜɴ], literally "wave motion fist" or "fist of surge") is a special attack from Capcom's Street Fighter series of fighting games. Game designer Takashi Nishiyama credits an energy attack called Hadouho (lit. the "Wave Motion Gun"), from the 1970s anime Space Battleship Yamato, as the origin of the Hadouken. It is used by the characters Ryu, Ken, Sakura, Akuma, and Gouken. The Hadouken, Shoryuken and Tatsumaki Senpukyaku are the three archetypal moves of these characters, as well as some of the most iconic and famous elements of the Street Fighter series or even video games in general.

== In Capcom games and merchandise ==
Street Fighter characters that use the Hadouken are Ryu and Ken since the first Street Fighter, later joined by Sakura, Gouken and Akuma. The move is achieved by the character thrusting their palms forward, sending a blast of spirit energy (or ki) towards the opponent ("ki blast"). It is normally performed by the player moving the joystick or D-pad a quarter circle forward towards the opponent from the down position, then pressing a punch button (so, for example, a character facing to the right would execute the move by pressing ↓, ↘, → and then "punch" in a smooth motion). Although the execution has been always the same, the design, speed, damage and other attributes of the technique vary in different games.

Most fighting games of the sprite-based era used at least some characters with projectile special moves, and while the actual type of projectile launched varies from game to game and character to character, the execution and behavior of these attacks are often rather similar to the Hadouken. The Hadouken can usually be performed in three different degrees depending on which type punch is used; these will affect its speed, damage caused on impact, amount of recovery frames and sometimes its range. The Hadouken itself has many variations depending on the character in question that the move is associated with. For example, both Ryu and Akuma use a fire-based variant of the move called the Shakunetsu Hadouken (灼熱波動拳) or Blazing Surge Fist, which briefly engulfs its target in flames. Later titles in the series that use super combo moves ramp up the power of the Hadouken, evolving it into the Shinku Hadouken (真空波動拳 – Vacuum Surge Fist). This takes one of two forms depending on the game: an outsized fireball or a blast of constant energy. Street Fighter III introduced the Denjin Hadouken (電刃波動拳), an unblockable, electrified version which could be 'stored' by holding down the punch key, for timing purposes. Introduced in the Capcom vs. SNK series, the "Evil Ryu" Kage's Satsui no Hadou Ryu uses a more powerful version called the Metsu Hadouken (滅波動拳), which acts similar to Denjin Hadouken, being unblockable and stunning the opponent. Street Fighter IV brought back the Metsu Hadouken, though it instead acts simply like a more powerful variant of the Shinkuu Hadouken. Street Fighter V brought back the Denjin Hadouken, which can be performed by performing the Shinku Hadouken while in Ryu's V Trigger mode. In Street Fighter 6, one of Luke's taunts involves him mocking a Hadoken.

An unofficial "Rainbow Edition" of Street Fighter II gave the Hadouken abilities to all characters, possibly influencing later official games. Since then, many others in the Street Fighter series have been given similar moves, but have their own names for it. For instance, Kairi and Allen Snider both have such a move, the latter calling it Fire Force. Dhalsim spits fire ("Yoga Fire") and Chun-Li eventually gained a projectile move she calls the Kikouken (気功拳, Qigong Fist). In Street Fighter III, Sean has no routine Hadouken, but can employ a similar super-move named the Hadou Burst. Dan Hibiki utilizes a single-handed projectile called the Gadouken (我道拳, Self-Taught Fist), which has barely any range or power. Ace can also use the Hadouken in Street Fighter EX3 once the third set of usable arts is unlocked in Character Edit Mode.

Other special moves derived from the Hadouken include the Soul Fist of Morrigan in the Darkstalkers series. The Hadouken has been seen several times in the Capcom's Mega Man X platform game series. It was a hidden Easter egg ability in the first game (Mega Man X) and its remake (Mega Man Maverick Hunter X). In Mega Man X4, Magma Dragoon uses the move (the copy of Magma Dragoon also uses the move in Mega Man X5). It was also available to the player in the Mega Man Xtreme games. The Tails Clan, a group of secret bosses in Mega Man X: Command Mission, use a move called "Annihilator Hadouken". There are also Hadouken emotes in the massive multiplayer role-playing video game Monster Hunter: World. Among the official or licensed merchandise, Multiverse Studio made plush Hadouken balls in 2015, Naked & Famous Denim produced the "Ryu Hadoken Selvedge" jeans pants in 2017 and Everlast released cologne perfume named after the Hadouken in 2018.

== Homages ==
=== In other video games ===
- In Art of Fighting, Ryo Sakazaki, Yuri Sakazaki, Takuma Sakazaki, and Marco Rodrigues use the Ko-Ou Ken. As one might guess, this is to the Kyokugenryu practitioners what the Hadouken is to the Ansatsuken users of the Street Fighter series.
- In Lunar: Eternal Blue, Jean has an attack named Haduken.
- In All New World of Lemmings, the Shadow Tribe Lemmings can perform the move while shouting out "Hadouken!". As described in the manual: "this is a fighting device – a weapon from an ancient Lemming Martial Art, Lemdo. Since it is magically empowered, it will throw out a fireball when used."
- In Fallout 2, the boxers in New Reno's gym will sometimes shout "Hadouken!" while fighting.
- In Call of Duty: Black Ops, Japanese character Takeo from the Zombies Mode yells "Hadouken!" at certain times in the game.
- In Team Fortress 2, the Pyro class can perform the Hadouken as a taunt when equipped with a secondary weapon.
- In Plants vs. Zombies: Garden Warfare 2, the Super Brainz character uses an attack very similar to the Hadouken.
- In Knack II, the title character learns a move similar to the Hadouken.
- Kirby's "Fighter" Copy Ability, debuting in Kirby Super Star, allows him to use moves similar in nature to the Hadouken, named the "Force Blast", "Mega Force Blast", and "Giga Force Blast", starting in Kirby & the Amazing Mirror. Additionally, starting in Kirby's Return to Dream Land, Kirby can perform an "Instant Mega Force Blast" by inputting the same quarter-circle command as the Hadouken.
- Kirby performs the actual Hadouken after inhaling and gaining the Copy Ability from Ryu in Super Smash Bros. for Nintendo 3DS and Wii U. In the follow-up Super Smash Bros. Ultimate, the ability returns, but Kirby can also get it from inhaling Ken. The command input is present in both games.

=== In other media ===
- Argentinian DJ duo Heatbeat released a 2010 track "Hadoken".
- In the film Ready Player One, Parzival uses the Hadouken against Sorrento during their battle.
- Referenced in Litany's "Call on Me".
- In a Bad Lip Reading parody of Donald Trump's inauguration, Hillary Clinton plans to use the move on Donald Trump.

=== Other uses ===
- Canadian professional wrestler Kenny Omega uses the Hadouken as one of his signature moves.
- Hadouken!, the grindie/dance-punk band from Leeds, West Yorkshire, take their name from the Street Fighter move.
- An open source GitHub project is named Hadouken.
- MMA fighter Shane Campbell simulated a Hadouken attack during his victorious fight with Derek Boyle in 2015.
- Manchester City Defender John Stones exclaimed "Hadouken!" upon watching a replay of his goal line clearance against Liverpool on January 3, 2019.

== Reception ==
Eurogamer's Wesley Yin-Poole claimed that most players of a "certain generation" had the move "ingrained in [their] psyche". Both Yin-Poole and The Escapist author Earnest Cavalli compare moves from non-Street Fighter games to the Hadouken technique. The PlayStation 4 received a "viral teaser" which featured a fake taxi service called Hadouken Cabs. A card in Street Fighter-themed Monopoly game was based on the Hadouken.

Game Informer's Kyle Hilliard included the Hadouken's cameo in Mega Man X in his list of his five favorite video game Easter eggs. He claimed that this was in part because without Internet at the time, he was unable to verify whether the Easter egg really existed. GamesRadar featured it in his list of the 100 best video game Easter eggs.

=== As an Internet meme ===
A meme called "Hadouken-ing" became popular in Japan and later the United States, where one person poses as though they have fired a Hadouken, and another person poses as if they were struck by it. Several celebrities have taken pictures of themselves performing the Hadouken meme. Community and Mad Men star Alison Brie performed a number of different Internet memes, one of which was Hadouken-ing. The cast of The Good Wife also took a picture of the meme being performed. Television personality Carrie Keagan also posed for this meme. New York's Daily News' Jacob E. Osterhout called it the biggest meme since the Harlem Shake. Critics of the meme claim that the meme is in fact a depiction of the Kamehameha from Dragon Ball Z and was in fact a "marketing ploy" for Dragon Ball Z: Battle of Gods.
