= Mega Man Xtreme 2 =

2001 video game

- North American box art
- Developer: Capcom Production Studio 3
- Publisher: Capcom
- Director: Koji Okohara
- Producers: Koji Nakajima; Tatsuya Minami
- Designer: Shino Okamura
- Programmer: Masatsugu Shinohara
- Composers: Toshio Kajino; Mitsuhiko Takano
- Series: Mega Man X
- Platform: Game Boy Color
- Release: JP: July 19, 2001; NA: November 12, 2001; EU: February 8, 2002
- Genre: Platform
- Mode: Single-player

Mega Man Xtreme 2 (Note: Known in Japan as Rockman X2: Soul Eraser (Japanese: ロックマンX2 ソウルイレイザー)) is a 2001 platform game developed and published by Capcom for the Game Boy Color. It is a spin-off title in the Mega Man X series and a follow-up to Mega Man Xtreme, which was released the previous year. Mega Man Xtreme 2 is set in the 22nd century between the events of Mega Man X3 and Mega Man X4. The DNA souls of robots known as "Reploids" are being stolen and used to create an army of undead "Mavericks". The "Maverick Hunters" X and Zero quickly spring into action with the help of their young ally Iris.

Gameplay in Mega Man Xtreme 2 is similar to that of earlier Mega Man games, retaining most elements from the home-console versions of the series, but adding the ability to switch between characters, use unique abilities and obtain upgrades through "DNA Souls" collected from fallen enemies. Each character has a different set of stages and bosses; defeating the stage's boss will earn the character a special weapon.

Mega Man Xtreme 2 was first announced in Japan in March 2001; Capcom was intent on localizing it for the western market. It was released in Japan on July 19, 2001, and in North America in November that year. Critics gave the game a mixed critical reception; reviewers were content to see some improvements over its predecessor but some felt its lack of innovation may not resonate with newcomers to the series. In 2013, Mega Man Xtreme 2 was made available on the Virtual Console of Japan's Nintendo eShop for the Nintendo 3DS, and was released in the North American eShop the following year.

== Plot ==
The Mega Man X universe is set in the 22nd century, where humans and intelligent robots called "Reploids" live among one another. After a tumultuous coexistence, some Reploids go "Maverick" and exhibit violent and destructive behavior. To end such activity, human scientist Dr. Cain established a taskforce of "Maverick Hunters". The series mostly follows the adventures of the Hunters X and Zero, who have numerous times saved the world from Maverick leader Sigma. Mega Man Xtreme 2 is set between the events of Mega Man X3 and Mega Man X4, during which X and Zero, with the aid of their new friend Iris, are sent to investigate erasure incidents on the mysterious Laguz Island. Reploids on Earth have been losing their "DNA Souls", leaving them useless piles of junk.

It is quickly revealed the DNA Souls are being used by a "Soul Eraser" named Berkana to resurrect a growing army of undead Mavericks. Berkana was once a Reploid researcher who created a DNA Soul chip that reproduced deceased Mavericks. Berkana steals the souls of Reploids to enhance her own power and that of her loyal partner Gareth. Once on the island, X and Zero encounter and destroy several powerful Mavericks from their past adventures. Rather than stop them early on, Berkana allows the two heroes to progress so they may strengthen their DNA Souls for her to take. X and Zero confront and defeat Gareth and Berkana inside the Reploid Research Laboratory. Sigma then reveals himself as the person behind the plot. X and Zero prevail over the Maverick leader, the DNA Souls are returned to the hollow Reploids, and peace is restored. Zero fears Iris' brother, the Colonel of the Repliforce army, will blame him for involving Iris in the incident but X feels the experience will ultimately help her.

== Gameplay ==
The player character Zero attacks an enemy in the opening stage.

Like its predecessor, Mega Man Xtreme 2 is an action-platform game that has the same gameplay as other Mega Man games with the added ability to switch between player characters X and Zero, and the "DNA Soul" system, none of which is present in earlier Mega Man X games. The player is tasked with completing a series of side-scrolling stages by avoiding obstacles and destroy end-stage bosses. Stages are typically linear, and present traps and enemy robots to combat, whereby the player can collect DNA Souls and items that refill health, ammunition, and extra lives; power-ups that improve the player's maximum health; and armor parts that grant X new abilities. Defeating the Maverick boss at the stage's end will earn the player a special weapon that can be used to more easily defeat other bosses, each of which is vulnerable to a unique weapon. After each stage, the DNA Souls gathered in the stage will accumulate; the player can use these to purchase additional upgrades from Iris. These upgrades improvements on speed and power to health-recharge and shielding.

In the game's normal difficulty mode, the player may choose between using X and using Zero, each with their own advantages and disadvantages. X uses his long-range "X-Buster", which can be charged for increased damage. Alternatively, Zero uses his "Z-Saber" for close-range combat. Zero risks losing health by closely approaching enemies but his sword attacks deal more damage. A difficulty setting called "Xtreme Mode" in which the player can switch between X and Zero on any stage, allowing them to gain different weapons depending on which bosses they defeat, can be unlocked. In this game, X and Zero do not both gain a weapon when a boss is defeated; only the character used to destroy the Maverick will get the special weapon. This major change from earlier games in the series adds a hint of strategy to the gameplay because the player must consider both the order in which they will fight each boss and whether X or Zero's gained weapons will prove more effective later on, and which are needed to gain difficult-to-reach power-ups. Beating Xtreme Mode will unlock a "Boss Rush" that allows the player to battle all eight Mavericks from this game and the eight Mavericks from the first Mega Man Xtreme game.

== Development and release ==
Mega Man Xtreme 2 was developed and published by Capcom. Artist Haruki Suetsugu designed the characters and Japanese package art for the game; he expressed joy over being able to illustrate Iris, having not been able to do so since Mega Man X4. Because Mega Man Xtreme 2 was intended to be set in earlier time than the earlier game, he modified Iris' outfit, removing her beret and giving her a uniform that would exude a youthful "schoolgirl look". Berkana and Gareth were drawn as a witch and a knight respectively to tie with the medieval theme of the villains in the first Mega Man Xtreme. Gareth's lion companion, for which Suetsugu was given specific design instructions, is not present in the game.

Mega Man Xtreme 2 was first announced in Japan in March 2001. Prior to Electronic Entertainment Expo (E3), Capcom announced it would localize the game for Western territories. Mega Man Xtreme 2 was released in Japan on July 19, 2001, and in North America on November 12 the same year. On July 18, 2013, it was confirmed Mega Man Xtreme 2 would be released on the 3DS Virtual Console in Japan on December 25, 2013, and in North America on May 29, 2014.

== Reception ==
Reception

Review scores
Publication	Score
AllGame	3.5 out of 5
Famitsu	26 out of 40
Game Informer	7 out of 10
GameSpot	7 out of 10
Nintendo Power	3 out of 5

Reviewers praised Mega Man Xtreme 2 as an improvement over its precursor. Giancarlo Varanini in GameSpot complimented the DNA Soul system as "interesting" while Skyler Miller in AllGame said in addition to the character-switching feature, both make the game "feel somewhat fresh". Game Informer praised the game's multiple hidden modes, higher boss intelligence, and steeper difficulty curve. Varanini said most of the unbalanced difficulty from the first Mega Man Xtreme has been alleviated, except for parts in which the player must leap off platforms without being able to see the next portion of the screen. Miller wrote, like other Mega Man titles, the game's difficulty level is "challenging to the point of frustration, but it somehow keeps from feeling impossible".

Miller and Varanini were generally satisfied with the graphics and sound of Mega Man Xtreme 2, though Miller noticed a few instances of visual slowdown and audible repetition. The two reviewers criticized the game's storyline and translation; Miller found the instruction manual and in-game texts to be inconsistent with one another in both narrative and character names. Varanini noted the plot's introduction mistakenly renders the word "laboratory" as "lavatory", which he said "ironically speaks to the quality of the storyline". Varanini was particularly disappointed by the game's use of previous stages and bosses, attributing it to Capcom's diminishing creativity. Miller and Varanini concurred Mega Man Xtreme 2 is a worthy sequel that is likely to please fans of the first game and of the Mega Man series, although it is hardly groundbreaking and may not resonate with newcomers. 1UP.com editor Jeremy Parrish, however, did not recommend either game, saying; "While less Xtremely bad than its predecessor ... this one's still not Xtremely good, either – especially considering the Zero series arrived not too long after its debut".

Mega Man Xtreme 2 received an aggregate score of 74.17 percent on Gamerankings.com. It ranked number six on Japanese sales charts for its weekend debut, selling 17,110 units. According to Dengeki Online, it sold 88,564 units in Japan in 2001, making it the 127th-best-selling game in the region that year. In 2012, IGN listed both Mega Man Xtreme and its precursor among titles they wished to see downloadable from the Nintendo eShop for the Nintendo 3DS.
