= Pull Tiger Tail =

British rock band

- Pull Tiger Tail at home

Background information
- Origin: London, England
- Genres: Indie
- Years active: 2006–2009
- Labels: Young and Lost Club Records (2006) (UK); B-Unique Records (2006-2007) (UK); New Art, Please (2009) (UK)
- Past members: Marcus Ratcliff; Jack Hamson; Davo McConville
- Website: Official Website

Pull Tiger Tail were an indie rock band based in London. Originating from Stratford-upon-Avon and Edinburgh; the band formed in 2006 while attending Goldsmiths College.

== History ==
=== Formation and Early Years ===
Pull Tiger Tail was formed in 2006 by three friends who met while attending school together. Later, they went on to study at Goldsmiths, University of London, where they further developed their artistic and musical talents. Marcus Ratcliff, Jack Hamson, and Davo McConville decided to start a band, drawing on their shared interests in music and visual art.

All three members had grown up together in Stratford-upon-Avon where they played in indie-rock band Antihero, releasing two singles and winning the support of John Peel on Radio 1.

Pull Tiger Tail played their debut gig at London's Tatty Bogle club on 2 February 2006.

=== Touring ===
During their active years, Pull Tiger Tail toured extensively across the UK and Europe. They participated in the NME Indie Rave Tour alongside Blood Red Shoes, The Little Ones, and The Rumble Strips. Additionally, they joined the MySpace Music Tour with Hadouken!. These tours helped the band build a dedicated following and made the band a popular live act.

=== Post-Breakup Activities ===
Following the breakup of Pull Tiger Tail in 2009, members Marcus Ratcliff and Jack Hamson continued their musical career by founding the band Thumpers in 2012. The band continued to tour and gained a following in the UK and the US, releasing a second album, Whipped & Glazed, in 2017. Davo McConville pursued multiple musical ventures after Pull Tiger Tail. He played bass for Your Twenties, a band formed by ex-Metronomy member Gabriel Stebbing. McConville later joined Night Works, Stebbing's solo project. McConville has also been active in visual arts and sound design, contributing to various creative projects.

Despite their relatively brief time together, Pull Tiger Tail became a notable indie on the breakout scene, garnering praise from Jackie Hitchen of the BBC.

== Band members ==
- Marcus Ratcliff - guitar, keys, vocals
- Davo McKenzie-McConville - bass, keys, vocals
- Jack Hamson - drums, vocals

== Discography ==
Albums

- Paws. (New Art, Please, 17 August 2009)
- The Lost World (New Art, Please, 14 December 2009)

Singles

- "Animator" (Young and Lost Club Records, 25 September 2006)
- "Mr 100%" (B-Unique Records, 11 December 2006)
- "Let's Lightning" (B-Unique Records, 26 March 2007)
- "Hurricanes" (B-Unique Records, 18 June 2007)
- "Mary Jane" (Young and Lost Club Records, 2 June 2008)
