= Mega Man X3 =

1995 video game

- North American SNES cover art
- Developer: Minakuchi Engineering (Note: PlayStation, Saturn, and Windows versions developed by Capcom.)
- Publishers: Capcom: Super NES; JP/NA: Capcom; PAL: Laguna Video Games PlayStation, Saturn; JP: Capcom; PAL: Virgin Interactive Entertainment Windows; JP/NA: Capcom; PAL: Virgin Interactive Entertainment
- Producer: Tokuro Fujiwara
- Artists: Keiji Inafune; Hayato Kaji; Tatsuya Yoshikawa; Kazushi Ito; Shinsuke Komaki
- Composers: Kinuyo Yamashita; Arranged; Toshihiko Horiyama; Shusaku Uchiyama; Yoshino Aoki; Makoto Tomozawa
- Series: Mega Man X
- Platforms: Super NES, PlayStation, Sega Saturn, Windows, mobile phone
- Release: December 1, 1995: Super NES; JP: December 1, 1995; NA: January 1996; EU: May 15, 1996 PlayStation, Saturn; JP: April 26, 1996; EU: March 1997 Windows; JP: March 28, 1997; NA: October 5, 1998; EU: 1998 Mobile; JP: July 1, 2010
- Genre: Platform
- Mode: Single-player

Mega Man X3 (Note: Stylized as MEGA MAN X³) (Note: Known in Japan as Rockman X3 (ロックマンX3, Rokkuman Ekkususurī)) is a 1995 platform game developed by Minakuchi Engineering and published by Capcom for the Super Nintendo Entertainment System (SNES). The game was originally released in Japan on December 1, 1995, and later in North American and PAL regions in 1996. It is the third game in the Mega Man X series and the last to appear on the SNES. Mega Man X3 takes place in a fictional future in which the world is populated by humans and intelligent robots called "Reploids". Like their human creators, some Reploids involve themselves in destructive crime and are labelled as "Mavericks". After twice defeating the Maverick leader Sigma, the heroes X and Zero must battle a Reploid scientist named Dr. Doppler and his utopia of Maverick followers.

Mega Man X3 follows the tradition of both the original Mega Man series and the Mega Man X series, as the player traverses a series of eight stages in any order while gaining various power-ups and taking the special weapon of each stage's end boss. Mega Man X3 is the first game in the series in which Zero is a playable character (albeit in limited form) in addition to X. Like its predecessor, Mega Man X2, X3 features the "Cx4" chip to allow for some limited 3D vector graphics and transparency effects.

A 32-bit version of Mega Man X3 was released on the PlayStation, Sega Saturn, and Microsoft Windows in various countries. This version was included in the North American Mega Man X Collection in 2006. A 3DO version was planned, but was canceled due to the failure of the console. The game was also ported to Japanese mobile phones in 2010. Critical reception for Mega Man X3 has been positive for its new inclusion of upgrades for X's abilities as well as the debut of Zero as a playable character. However, the game, particularly the 32-bit version, has received miscellaneous criticism from reviewers for its lack of improvements to the series. The SNES version of Mega Man X3 was released on the Wii U Virtual Console in 2014, and was re-released for Nintendo Switch, PlayStation 4, Windows, and Xbox One as part of Mega Man X Legacy Collection in 2018.

== Gameplay ==
A charged-up Zero approaches an enemy in Toxic Seahorse's stage. Mega Man X3 is the first game in the series to feature Zero as a playable character.

Mega Man X3 adopts the gameplay of Mega Man X and Mega Man X2, an expansion of the gameplay model of the original Mega Man series, which both involve controlling the protagonist X and completing a series of eight selectable stages. Each stage has a variety of obstacles, traps, and enemy robots to fight. The stage ends in a Maverick boss fight; defeating this boss will add a new special weapon to the player's arsenal. Each boss is particularly weak to one special weapon, so the player may complete the stages in an order that best exploits these weaknesses. The player character X retains certain abilities from past games. Namely, he is able to run, jump, dash, cling to and scale most walls, and fire his chargeable "X-Buster" arm cannon and special weapons. The player can further upgrade X's abilities by collecting armor parts (head, body, legs, and X-Buster) found within capsules in some levels. Capsules containing special chips add new abilities as well. X is generally only able to benefit from one chip at a time, allowing the player to customize the character as needed.

Like the two previous Mega Man X games, the player can locate power-ups such as "Heart Tanks" for extending the maximum life energy and "Sub-Tanks" for storing energy for later use. Also returning are powerful "Ride Armor" vehicles that can be piloted in some of the stages. Items hidden within certain levels can be collected which allow the player to summon vehicles at any time. Mega Man X3 is the first game in the series which allows the player to play as X's ally Zero, although his playability is more limited compared to later games in the series. Zero can be called to take X's place during nearly any stage, but he cannot collect any of X's armor parts or power-ups, and cannot fight mid-stage or end-stage bosses, with only one exception that grants access to a secret weapon for X. If Zero is ever defeated in battle, he will be unable to be called upon for the rest of the game.

== Plot ==
The story of Mega Man X3 is set during the 22nd century (the year "21XX"), in which after Mega Man X2 humans coexist with intelligent robots called "Reploids" (replicant androids). Due to their free will, some Reploids are prone to criminal activity and are said to go "Maverick". Dr. Cain, the inventor of the Reploids, establishes a military taskforce called the "Maverick Hunters" to prevent it. Even after two successful efforts by the Hunters X and Zero to stop a Maverick leader named Sigma from attempting to exterminate the human race, Maverick activity seems to continue. However, the threat of the Mavericks is later neutralized thanks to the technology of the Reploid scientist Dr. Doppler, which prevents the Mavericks from going berserk. The reformed Reploids form a utopia near their new mentor called "Dopple Town". It seemed that all is well until the former Reploids suddenly revert and once again begin causing trouble, even going so far as to attack Hunter headquarters. Doppler is held accountable, and X and Zero are sent out to contain the new threat.

Once the two heroes defeat Doppler and the forces that have sworn allegiance to him, the scientist comes to his senses and realizes all the damage that he has done. He explains that Sigma is alive as a computer virus, and that Doppler was corrupted in order to create a new body for Sigma. X seeks out Sigma, and after an intense battle, the Sigma Virus in its pure form chases X in an attempt to infect and possess him. Once X finds himself at a dead end, one of two things may happen. In one of the game's endings, Zero takes Doppler's true antivirus software and uploads it onto his sabre offscreen. He rushes in to save X just in time and causes Sigma to explode, destroying the lab as they evacuate. However, if Zero is injured during the game, Doppler instead uses his own body as the antivirus and sacrifices himself for the greater good.

== Development and release ==
By the time production began, Keiji Inafune, a major contributor to the Mega Man franchise, had transitioned from his role as an artist to director, producer, and writer. Starting with Mega Man X2, Inafune wanted to use a computer virus as a plot device, something he considered a more interesting idea than a tangible villain. Inafune's other duties included merchandising the game into toys and trading cards. Although the game's scenario, character designs and artwork were done at Capcom, much of the actual game design was sub-contracted to Minakuchi Engineering, who had previously developed most of the Mega Man games on the Game Boy along with the compilation game Mega Man: The Wily Wars for the Mega Drive. Inafune recalled experiencing "psychological turmoil" over allowing "outsiders" to handle the game's development. Inafune's only illustrative designs for the game were the characters X, Zero, and Vile. Inafune admitted being very "possessive" of Zero, which he had a vested interest in since the character's creation for the first Mega Man X. All of the designs for the game's other characters, bosses, and its minor enemies were divided among artists Hayato Kaji, Tatsuya Yoshikawa, Shinsuke Komaki, and Kazushi Itou. Mega Man X3 is graphically similar to its two predecessors, and even utilizes the SNES Cx4 from Mega Man X2. This digital signal processor cartridge chip allows for basic 3D graphical effects such as rotation, enlarging, and shrinking of wireframe objects.

The game was first released in Japan on December 1, 1995, followed by North America in January 1996 and Europe on May 15, 1996. Ports for the Sega Saturn and PlayStation were released in Japan on April 26, 1996, and in Europe in March 1997. Capcom stated that it was licensing these versions to a USA company for release in North America, but they were ultimately never released in the region. A Windows port of this 32-bit edition was released in Japan in 1997 and in North America and Europe in 1998. The port versions feature additional animated full-motion video cutscenes, rearranged and remixed music tracks, and completely different sound effects than the original SNES version. A port for the 3DO was announced in Japan in 1996, but was not released. The Japanese PlayStation version of Mega Man X3 was eventually re-released as part of Sony's "The Best for Family" line of budget titles. The PlayStation version of Mega Man X3 was included in Mega Man X Collection, released for the PlayStation 2 and GameCube in North America in early 2006. Mega Man X3 was released on EZweb-compatible mobile phones in Japan on July 1, 2010. The SNES version of Mega Man X3 was released on the Wii U Virtual Console in North America on August 28, 2014, in Japan on October 8, 2014, and the PAL regions on November 6, 2014. It was re-released for Nintendo Switch, PlayStation 4, Windows, and Xbox One as part of Mega Man X Legacy Collection which was released on July 24, 2018, worldwide and July 26, 2018, in Japan.

The game's soundtrack was composed by freelancer Kinuyo Yamashita. Although the Minakuchi Engineering Staff is credited in the game's soundtrack album, Yamashita worked for them in a freelance capacity rather than being an actual employee of the company. The Japanese 32-bit editions feature two J-pop vocal songs by Kotono Shibuya: the opening theme "One More Time" and the ending theme "I'm Believer". Both the SNES and 32-bit versions of the musical score were included on the second disc of Capcom Music Generation: Rockman X1 ~ X6 soundtrack released by Suleputer in 2003.

== Reception ==
Reception

Aggregate score
Aggregator	Score
GameRankings	70.77% (SNES)

Review scores
Publication	Score
AllGame	SNES: 4/5
Electronic Gaming Monthly	SNES: 8.5/10, 7.5/10, 7/10, 7/10
Famitsu	SNES: 7/10, 6/10, 7/10, 5/10; SAT: 7/10, 6/10, 6/10, 6/10; PS1: 7/10, 6/10, 6/10, 6/10
Game Players	SNES: 81/100
GameFan	SNES: 87 of 100; SAT: 71 of 100
GamePro	SNES: 4/5
Super Play	SNES: 70%
Dengeki PlayStation	60/100, 60/100
Saturn Power	SAT: 23%
Sega Saturn Magazine	SAT: 66%
Computer Games Magazine	PC: 1/5

Press reception for Mega Man X3 was mostly positive. Reviewers praised the game's tried-and-true gameplay, graphics, control, and the option to play as Zero. Mike Weigand of GamePro was generally pleased with the game, and, though he admitted it brought little new to the franchise, enjoyed the increased difficulty, tight controls, and new special effects. Weigand summarized, "It may be routine for experience players, but anyone who hasn't played a 16-bit game in the series will discover Mega magic." GameFan reviewer Dave Halverson was equally impressed by the "speed, diversity, special FX, and power up's," calling it "a fitting 16-bit finale to a great series". IGN similarly asserted Mega Man X3 as "a solid send-off for the 16-bit era", naming it the 67th-best SNES of all time on a 2011 list. Two of Electronic Gaming Monthly's reviewers considered the game an improvement over X2 with its larger levels and huge number of secrets, while the other two focused on its overt similarity to previous games in the series.

Some felt Mega Man X3 was too similar to past Mega Man games. Super Play writer Jonathan Davies found the game far too similar to Mega Man X2, questioning whether or not "Capcom are cashing in on their loyal fans". All but one of the four reviewers for Electronic Gaming Monthly complained that the game is too similar to other Mega Man games, with one writing: "I am so sick of Mega Man, that I have dreams at night of the blue-clothed hero showing up at my house and forcing me to play more of his redundant titles. This latest release is just like all the rest." Likewise, 1UP.com writer Jeremy Parish thought that the game differed little from past releases, complaining that it was "more of the same, but with a kitchen-sink design philosophy that made every single level feel like a sluggish, ill-designed mess." GameSpot editors Christian Nutt and Justin Speer specifically felt the number of power-ups and bonuses overshadowed the gameplay, barely benefiting from the addition of Zero as a limited playable character.

The port versions of the game suffered more negative criticism than their SNES counterpart. The level designs and overall gameplay were highly criticized by Computer Games Magazine contributor Nathan Smith, who reviewed the late Windows release of the game. "Packing more cliché console conventions than you can shake a gamepad at," Smith opined, "you'll need the patience of Job, the manual dexterity of a nine-year-old, and the intelligence of Forrest Gump to really enjoy this one." Saturn Power denoted Mega Man X3 the worst Saturn title in the console's available game library. Matt Yeo of Sega Saturn Magazine had fair comments about Mega Man X3 as an SNES game, but labeled the UK Saturn version "a bit of a travesty" due to its lack of innovation and a "dubious" quality of the anime cutscenes. Halverson enjoyed the use of redbook audio in the 32-bit conversion despite not finding the music particularly memorable. Both Yeo and Halverson were dismayed by the use of letterbox borders in the Saturn version, which horizontally reduces the screen size. In 2018, Complex listed the game #73 on its "The Best Super Nintendo Games of All Time".

The North American and the European SNES version of Mega Man X3 are very rare due to their limited run and the fact that they were released during declining support of the console. Despite higher-than-expected retail orders for their SNES products, Capcom had lowered its shipping of 16-bit titles during the fall 1995 release quarter due to supply and demand. To give the game a chance of turning a profit in spite of its limited production run, Capcom had to price it higher than any previous Mega Man title. In more recent times, Mega Man X3 cartridges fetch very large sums of money on collector and auction websites such as eBay. Despite game's innovation over including Zero as a playable character, the team noted that there were little differences between him and X which led to a redesign in the next sequel, Mega Man X4, as a swordsman rather than a gunner like the other protagonist.
