= Mega Man Xtreme =

2000 video game

- North American cover art
- Developer: Capcom
- Publisher: Capcom
- Director: Koji Okohara
- Producer: Tatsuya Minami
- Designer: Shino Okamura
- Artist: Haruki Suetsugu
- Composers: Toshio Kajino; Saori Utsumi
- Series: Mega Man X
- Platform: Game Boy Color
- Release: JP: October 20, 2000; NA: January 10, 2001; EU: August 24, 2001
- Genre: Platform
- Mode: Single-player

Mega Man Xtreme (Note: Known in Japan as Rockman X: Cyber Mission (Japanese: ロックマンX サイバーミッション)) is a 2000 platform game developed and published by Capcom for the Game Boy Color. It is a spin-off title in the Mega Man X series of video games that originated on the Super Nintendo Entertainment System. Mega Man Xtreme takes place within the series timeline during the 22nd century, in which a group of "Maverick" androids called the "Shadow Hunters" hack into the world's "Mother Computer" system, destabilize all of the networks, and allow other Mavericks to cause rampant destruction all over the world. The heroic "Maverick Hunter" X is tasked with going into cyberspace to relive his past missions and put a stop to the group's plans.

Mega Man Xtreme contains the same gameplay as its home console counterparts. An action-platform game, the player must attempt a series of stages, gain various power-ups such as armor parts, and defeat each stage's boss, assimilating its signature weapon. The game features stages, enemies, and bosses from both Mega Man X and Mega Man X2 for the Super Nintendo Entertainment System (SNES). Mega Man Xtreme was met with a mixed critical response. Reviewers enjoyed its familiar gameplay, but were disappointed by graphical issues and a high difficulty level. The game was followed by a sequel, Mega Man Xtreme 2, also for the Game Boy Color. In 2013, Mega Man Xtreme was made available on the Virtual Console of Japan's Nintendo eShop for the Nintendo 3DS. It was later released in the North American eShop the following year in 2014.

== Plot ==
Mega Man Xtreme takes place within the Mega Man X series timeline, during the 22nd century in which humans and intelligent androids called "Reploids" coexist. Daily life is under constant threat by "Mavericks", Reploids that have gone dangerously rogue. The series follows the exploits of X and his partner Zero, a pair of "Maverick Hunters" led by the benevolent Dr. Cain. These hunters have been responsible for suppressing the threat of reploid uprising, particularly that of a dangerous Maverick leader named Sigma. At the opening of the normal difficulty mode of Mega Man Xtreme, a hacker named Techno from a band called the "Shadow Hunters" breaks into the world's Mother Computer, destabilizing all of the networks and allowing Mavericks wreak havoc everywhere. X awakens to find himself on the highway from his first adventure to stop Sigma. Realizing it is merely a simulated replication, the protagonist is greeted by Zero, who informs X that the Maverick Hunters have partnered with a computer genius named Middy to stop the current crisis.

With Middy's help, X dives into cyberspace to erase the battle data of four Maverick bosses from his previous missions. Once they are beaten, X makes his way to Mother Computer core and defeats the Shadow Hunter Zain, only to see Zain's companions Techno and Geemel retreat and Sigma unveils himself as the mastermind behind the hack. Dr. Cain manages to find Sigma's base, and X warps there via the Mother Computer core. At the hideout, X confronts Techno, firing his buster at the computer used to hack into the Mother Computer. Techno reveals that in order to hack into the Mother Computer he had to upload his own CPU into the computer X destroyed. Middy arrives, revealing that Techno is his twin brother. Having been controlled by Sigma, Techno comes to his senses and dies. X continues on, finds Sigma, and defeats him. The computer core begins to detonate, but as X escapes, Middy chooses to stay, stating that he and his twin brother share a CPU and perishes alongside Techno. The hard mode of Mega Man Xtreme partially extends the storyline, where Zero informs X that someone else has illegally accessed records from the Mother Computer and reproduced more Maverick data. The heroes soon learn that Geemel and Sigma are again responsible and dispatch both villains in a similar fashion.

== Gameplay ==
The player character X approaches an enemy in the opening stage.

Mega Man Xtreme is an action-platform game that features the same gameplay as the Mega Man X games on non-handheld game consoles. As the titular protagonist, the player is tasked with completing a series of selectable, side-scrolling stages in any order desired. X has the ability to run, jump, scale walls, and fire his chargeable "X-Buster" arm cannon to overcome enemies in each stage. These stages consist of various obstacles, enemies, and a boss at the end. As the player progresses, helpful power-ups such as health, weapon energy and extra lives can be found or dropped from slain foes. Permanent power-ups include special tanks that extend the player's life bar, storage units that allow for surplus health energy to be saved for later use and armor parts that grant X new abilities such as improved damage resistance and ability to dash-jump off walls. Fully depleting the health of the end-stage boss will clear the stage and allow X to add the boss' weapon to his arsenal. As each boss is weak to another's weapon, the player can defeat the bosses more easily by choosing to complete the stages in a specific order.

Like the portable incarnations of the original Mega Man series, Mega Man Xtreme borrows content from its home console counterparts released on the Super Nintendo. The game is composed mostly of elements from Mega Man X and X2, as well as new content made specifically for the game. Mega Man Xtreme contains three difficulty levels with Normal and Hard mode making up the game's main narrative and featuring only four of the eight main bosses in each, while Xtreme mode acts as a bonus scenario with all eight bosses available to fight from the beginning.

== Development and release ==
Mega Man Xtreme was developed and published by Capcom. The Japanese version of the game was initially debuted as a playable demo at the Electronic Entertainment Expo in May 2000. The game was shown at the Tokyo Game Show the following fall. Haruki Suetsugu was the sole artist responsible for the game's character designs and cover art, just as he had been for both Mega Man X4 and Mega Man X5. He designed the twins Middy and Techno so that if one's helmet is turned 90 degrees, it is shaped like the other's helmet. Additionally, Middy was illustrated with soft, round lines and Techno was given sharper, pointed angles, each to reflect their personalities. Going by his instructions, Suetsugu designed Zain and Geemel in contrast to one another by giving them heavy and light armor plating respectively. He felt his illustrations may be too complex for the Game Boy Color's hardware, but he was greatly satisfied with the outcome by graphics designers. Mega Man Xtreme was released in Japan on October 20, 2000, and in North America on January 10, 2001.

== Reception and legacy ==
Reception

Review scores
Publication	Score
AllGame	3.5/5
Electronic Gaming Monthly	6/10
Famitsu	24 /40
Game Informer	7.75/10
GameSpot	6.4/10
IGN	8/10
Nintendo Power	3.5/5

Mega Man Xtreme has an aggregate score of 79% on GameRankings. Opinions on the presentation of Mega Man Xtreme have somewhat varied, though all agreed the game appears as a compact version of the SNES titles. Allgame contributor Jon Thompson justified the game's graphical inferiority to the SNES titles. "While obviously some graphic cutbacks have been made, due to the limitations of the system, the levels are still colorful and vibrant," he explained, "And the enemies, while many have been scaled down from their original sizes, are still clear and visually pleasing as ever." Frank Provo of GameSpot and Marc Nix of IGN both noted the animation of the protagonist to stand out among the other sprites. Provo overall called the backgrounds "neither garish nor ugly", but complained about the frame rate, control, and collision detection in certain areas and an apparent flicker throughout the game. Nix only noticed these irritations when playing Mega Man Xtreme on an original Game Boy or Game Boy Pocket, and that they can be alleviated by using a Game Boy Color. Associated Press writer William Schiffman found the controls relatively easy, even for younger gamers. Thompson and Provo were each satisfied with the "catchy" background music, though the latter reviewer believed the sound instrumentals to be "laughably tinny".

In terms of gameplay, critics saw Mega Man Xtreme as a competent entry among home console titles in the franchise. Thompson and Nix pointed out that like other Mega Man X games and unlike the classic Mega Man series, Mega Man Xtreme focused more on the end-stage boss battles than the stages themselves. A universal complaint about the game was its high difficulty. Provo largely traced this to the graphical issues and hard bosses. However, though he suggested that the player can overcome the challenge of earlier bosses with practice and patience, the final few battles become "an exercise in frustration", particularly in Xtreme mode. Nix attributed the difficulty to the player's need for Sub-Tanks and armor upgrades hidden in very remote locations. "Since there's no indicator to let players know when they've finished a stage 100%, most won't know that these bonuses are even there, and there's so few of them hidden that some gamers may never even guess that hidden stuff is even part of the gameplay," he concluded. "Without those obscure items, even the best gamers would find the further battles of this game a nightmare." 1UP.com editor Jeremy Parish was less specific about his objections with the game, but nonetheless called it a "rough transition" from SNES to Game Boy Color, "bordering on unplayable".

Mega Man Xtreme was the fourth best-selling video game in Japan during its week of release at 15,312 copies. The game dropped to the eighth slot the next week, selling an additional 11,279 copies. Media Create sales information shows that Mega Man Xtreme was the 182nd best-selling game in Japan in 2000 at 64,011 copies sold. Mega Man Xtreme was followed by a sequel, Mega Man Xtreme 2, released for the Game Boy Color in 2001. In 2012, IGN listed both games among titles they wished to see downloadable from the Nintendo eShop for Nintendo 3DS. On July 18, 2013, Capcom confirmed that Mega Man Xtreme was planned for release on the 3DS Virtual Console. It was released on the platform in Japan on December 4, 2013, and in North America on May 1, 2014.
