= Paws. =

Studio album by Pull Tiger Tail
- Released: 17 August 2009 (digital); 14 September 2009 (physical)
- Recorded: 2006–2007
- Genre: Indie rock
- Length: 41:22
- Labels: New Art, Please

Pull Tiger Tail chronology
Paws. (2009)	The Lost World (2009)

Professional ratings
Review scores
Source	Rating
The Fly	4/5 stars
Gigwise	6/10 stars
Rock Sound	8/10

Paws. is the only studio album by the British indie band Pull Tiger Tail. The album was completed in February 2007 but management difficulties and trouble with B-Unique, the band's record label at the time, meant that it remained legally in the hands of the label even after the band was no longer signed to them. In 2009, the album was in the hands of the band and was physically released on 14 September 2009 on CD and vinyl formats, with the latter being a limited edition of 250. A digital download of the album was made available from 17 August 2009.

== Track listing ==
All tracks are written by Pull Tiger Tail.

No.	Title	Length
1.	"...For No One"	3:54
2.	"Mr 100%"	2:48
3.	"Loki"	3:52
4.	"Let's Lightning"	3:35
5.	"Hurricanes"	4:00
6.	"Animator"	3:31
7.	"Even Good Kids Make Bad Sports"	4:10
8.	"Eugene"	3:47
9.	"I Call It It"	2:59
10.	"Air Born"	4:32
11.	"It's About Destruction..."	4:19
12.	"Pixel Thing (Pre-order bonus track)"	3:22

Tracks 2, 4, 5, 6 and 7 have all been previously released as singles or B-sides, although the versions of "Animator" and "Even Good Kids Make Bad Sports" on the album are different to those previously released.
