= X (Mega Man) =

Main character of Capcom's Mega Man X series

- Mega Man character
- Concept art of X as seen in Maverick Hunter X by Tatsuya Yoshikawa
- First game: Mega Man X (1993)
- Created by: Keiji Inafune; Hayato Kaji
- Voiced by: English: Philip Maurice Hayes (MM 1994 TV series); Ruth Marie Jarman (X4); Peter von Gomm (X7); Mark Gatha (2004–2006); Iain Gibb (Mega Man ZX Advent); Zach LeBlanc (Puzzle Fighter); Ted Sroka (2017–present); Japanese: Megumi Ogata (X1); Kentaro Ito (X4); Showtaro Morikubo (2000–2003); Takahiro Sakurai (2004–present); Takahiro Mizushima (Mega Man Zero series)

In-universe information
- Species: Reploid

X (Japanese: エックス, Hepburn: Ekkusu) (Note: Sometimes referred to as "Mega Man X" or "Rockman X" (Japanese: ロックマンX, Hepburn: Rokkuman Ekkusu) in Japan (see Original concept).) is a fictional character and the main protagonist of Capcom's Mega Man X video game series. First introduced in the 1993 Super NES video game Mega Man X, X is a highly advanced Robot, an anthropomorphic android, and member of the Maverick Hunters, a special police force tasked with defending humans and Reploids from criminal Reploids known as Mavericks. X has made additional appearances in the Mega Man franchise, including printed adaptations of the series, the original video animation (OVA) The Day of Sigma, which explores his early days as a Hunter, as a supporting character in the Mega Man Zero and Mega Man ZX video game series, which star his Hunter comrade Zero. Outside of the franchise, X has also appeared in multiple crossover video game series.

Keiji Inafune and artist Hayato Kaji created X as a contrasting successor to the original Mega Man, wielding a similar weapon called the "X-Buster" (エックスバスター, Ekkusu Basutā) and possessing the ability to take enemies' weapons. However, he was given darker characterization and multiple sets of armor that enhance his abilities, as well as the alternative "Ultimate Armor" (アルティメットアーマー, Arutimetto Āmā) which enhances all his powers, also retaining it in crossover games as part of his strongest techniques. X has been voiced by multiple actors in the Japanese and English versions of the franchise.

Critics have generally praised X, with game journalists often finding him a worthy successor to Mega Man because of his unique traits and complex characterization as a tragic hero who hates violence. His partnership with Zero was also praised due to their different yet complementary skills. However, X was noted as being less popular than Zero, and his English voice actors have often been criticized as not fitting his characterization.

== Appearances ==
=== In the Mega Man X series ===
In the original Mega Man X, X was created by Dr. Light in the year 20XX and was the template on which all non-Light-model androids, known as Reploids, were based. Light named him X after the variable "x" which, in algebraic terms, represents limitless possibility, similar to X's advanced systems. Light died before X's diagnostics were complete; 100 years later, X was discovered in his capsule by another scientist, Dr. Cain, who attempted to emulate X's technology and created the first mass-produced Reploids based on his design. Sigma, the leader of the Maverick Hunters, enlisted X to combat the Reploids, but he later became a Maverick himself and led a revolt. In order to stop Sigma, X teamed up with Zero, one of the last remaining Hunters. In the remake Mega Man Maverick Hunter X, an original video animation (OVA) titled The Day of Sigma retells these events before the game begins. In the game, X is defeated by the Maverick Vile but is rescued by Zero. X then faces multiple Mavericks and reaches Sigma after finally defeating Vile with Zero's aid. After defeating Sigma, X continues searching for Mavericks to maintain peace.

X appears as a boss in Maverick Hunter X if the player unlocks Vile, which ends with Zero rescuing him. In their next encounter, X once again appears as a boss alongside Zero, which ends with the former incapacitating Vile, forcing him to flee.

X becomes a high ranking Hunter in the sequels Mega Man X2, where he continues his search for Mavericks; and in Mega Man X3, where a virus created by Sigma infects Reploids. In his ending from Mega Man X4, after a battle with the Repliforce military, X's constant struggles in defeating new Mavericks cause him to fear that he himself may be becoming a Maverick. In Mega Man X5, X can appear as a boss in the final stages if the player uses Zero, believing that he might be turning into a Maverick due to Sigma's virus. In Mega Man X6, X continues facing Reploids that have become Mavericks as a result of a virus. In Mega Man X7, he becomes reluctant to continue his missions until he realizes that allowing Red Alert's forces to continue unchecked will result in more casualties. In Mega Man X8, X is playable alongside Zero and Axl, who are shocked to discover that all Reploids will become copies of Sigma in the future, leading to fear that the war will never end.

X also appears in the spin-offs Mega Man Xtreme, where he fights Mavericks alongside the computer genius Middy, and Mega Man Xtreme 2, where he fights against the "Soul Eraser" Berkana, who plans to resurrect a growing army of undead Mavericks from the past. In Mega Man X: Command Mission, X leads a resistance team to defeat the minions of the Rebellion Army. The mobile game Mega Man X Dive also features X as a playable character.

X reprises his role from the first game in three manga by Iwamoto Yoshihiro and the prequel Irregular Hunter Rockman X by Ikehara Shigeto. Yoshihiro wrote an alternative ending to Mega Man X5 where the now awakened Maverick Zero kills X; however, a guilt-driven Zero revives X with his own remains to continue their mission to kill Sigma. A Brazilian comic was also written where the cast often breaks the fourth wall. Although X's characterization in Yoshihiro's manga is commonly sensitive, in the adaptation of Mega Man X4, he awakens a sadistic side when wearing the Ultimate Armor.

=== Other appearances ===
X appears in the sequel series Mega Man Zero. In the first game, the scientist Ciel creates an X replica that goes out of control and tries to kill Zero. In the game's ending, the real X appears and, weary of fighting, asks Zero to take his place on the battlefield. In Mega Man Zero 2, X's body is destroyed by the antagonistic Elpizo, but his mind remains active until he fades away in Mega Man Zero 3 after protecting Zero from Omega. In the final sequel, Mega Man ZX, X appears as a biometal called Model X created by Ciel, which the protagonists can use to obtain the Reploid's power.

X appeared in the Mega Man episode "Mega X", where he follows the Mavericks Vile and Spark Mandrill, who ally with Dr. Wily, through time to the present and teams up with Mega Man to stop them from obtaining Lightanium for Sigma. In Dead Rising, Frank West can unlock and wear an X outfit, and can use it as part of his hyper combo in Tatsunoko vs. Capcom: Ultimate All-Stars. In Ultimate Marvel vs. Capcom 3, X appears as a DLC costume for Frank and Zero and makes a cameo appearance in Zero's ending. X appears in Super Smash Bros. for Nintendo 3DS/Wii U and Super Smash Bros. Ultimate as part of Mega Man's Final Smash, and Mii Gunners can access X's armor through paid DLC in both games. X appears with Zero in Project X Zone and its sequel. X is a playable character in Marvel vs. Capcom: Infinite and Puzzle Fighter with his Command Mission design as an alternate skin. X also appears in the digital card game Teppen.

X makes guest appearances in the Mega Man comic series in stories set shortly before the events of Mega Man X and as part of the "Worlds Unite" crossover event. Writers noted that, prior to his introduction, many fans sent them messages expressing a desire to see X portrayed as a darker character. They decided not to start with the Command Mission incarnation, which depicted X as more of a leader.

== Creation and development ==
=== Original concept ===
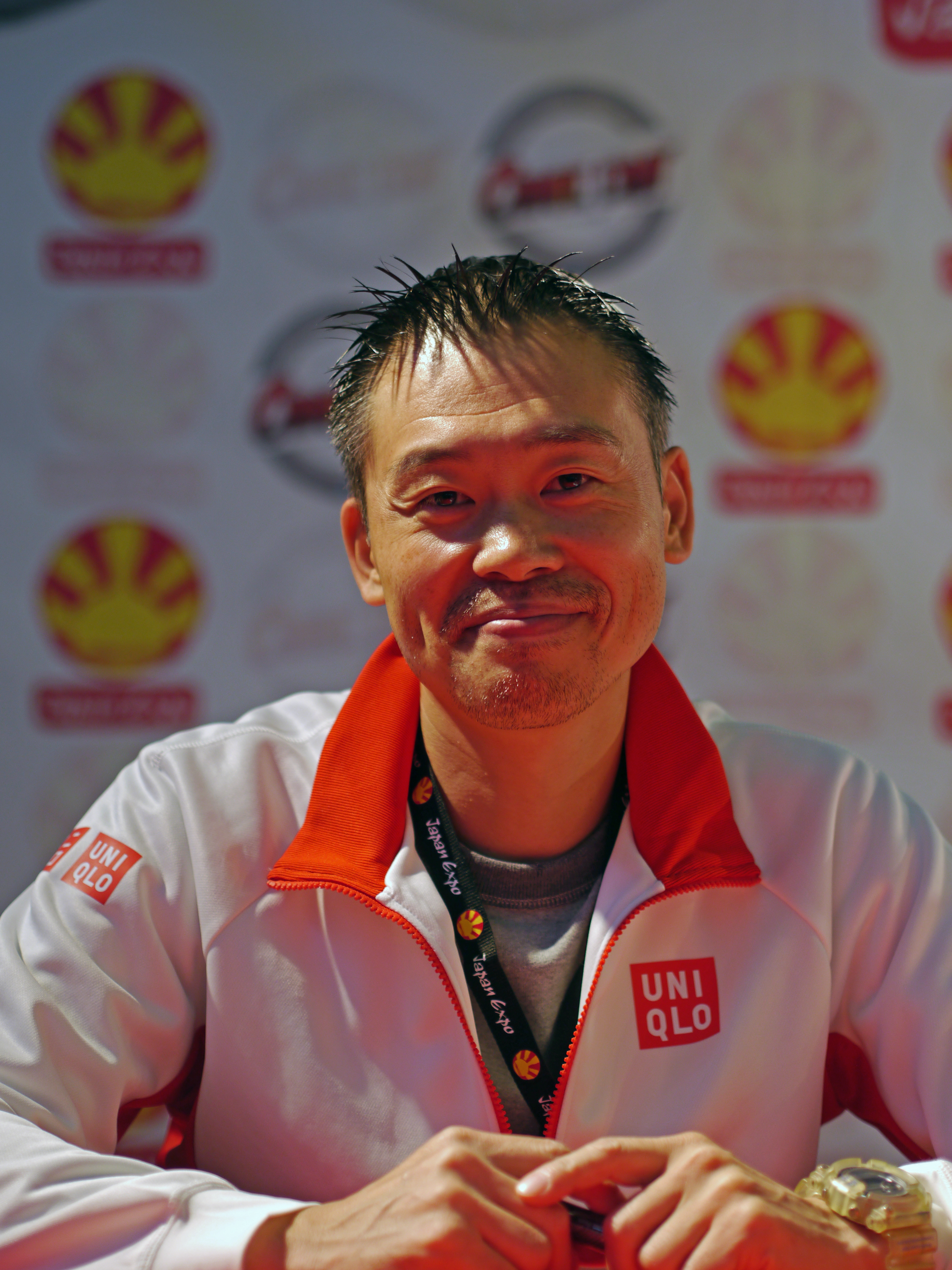
Inspired by role-playing games, Keiji Inafune (pictured) created armors for X to wear and come up with new special moves.

When the NES began to be overshadowed by its successor, the Super NES, Capcom designer Keiji Inafune embraced the improved graphics engine and developed a darker plot and character design compared to the original Mega Man franchise. Inafune felt that the original title character was too wholesome and that his successor should have an "edge". To this end, he created two new characters for the new "X" series being developed: the main character, X, and his partner, Zero. Inafune's protégé, Hayato Kaji, credited as "Rippa H.K", illustrated the protagonist X, but struggled with the initial design. It had a wider palette of colors available on the Super NES as compared to the NES.

Inafune originally created the character Zero to be the game's main, playable protagonist. Fearing a negative reaction from fans, Zero was ultimately reduced to a role secondary to X. Inafune noted that in early sketches, X and Zero were too similar, so Capcom aimed to make their silhouettes contrast one another in order to make the merchandise easier to distinguish. Early illustrations of X made him look like a "cold-blooded killer", which led artists to soften his features in later games. Although there is some misconception regarding X's name since he is referred to as "Mega Man X" or "Rockman X" in some sources released before 2001, Inafune claimed that "X" is his true name.

Inafune and Kaji worked simultaneously on various designs for X with different pieces of armor attached. The ideas for the armor parts arose in conjunction with the rise in popularity of role-playing video games. Inafune felt that Mega Man had always represented a classic action game formula where the hero earns his defeated enemies' abilities, and the armor parts were added to supplement this concept. Although X initially wields only one weapon, the X-Buster (エックスバスター, Ekkusu Basutā), each armor upgrade in subsequent games enhances its power. In regards to his personality, artist Keisuke Mizuno found him complex and challenging, as the first game emphasizes the fact that X was created by Dr. Light to form peace between Reploids and humans, which puts pressure on him.

Since the series' beginning, Capcom artist Haruki Suetsugu had been impressed by the handling of the relationship between X and Zero. From his point of view, X was a character who often made mistakes in combat and constantly tried to improve. As a result, Suetsugu felt that he could relate with X, who was written to be a "B class" Hunter in contrast to Zero being the superior "Special A" rank. Suetsugu replaced Inafune as designer starting with the fourth game; nevertheless, he regretted some of his illustrations, as X lacked the appeal that Zero originally had.

=== Development and designs ===
Capcom's Ryuji Higurashi designed X for the spin-off Command Mission due to criticism of the original work looking too simple.

Hitoshi Ariga designed X's secret "Ultimate Armor" (アルティメットアーマー, Arutimetto Āmā) for the fourth title of the game, available only after inputting a cheat code, and for a corresponding Japanese Bandai action figure under the term "Mega Armor". He was given four days to complete the design, and after finishing the design for the in-game parts, his supervisor told him to start over. After tinkering with the X3 Mega Armor parts, he noticed that attaching them in specific ways made them look like an airplane, which gave him the ideas he needed to complete the project, resulting in a special technique called Nova Strike (ノヴァ・ストライク, Nova Sutoraiku) where X dashes like a plane. Ariga recalled creating the armor as a difficult yet fun task, and he revealed that Zero was intended to have a similar set of armor which did not get released at the time. Artist Ryuji Higurashi designed X's new Falcon Armor (ファルコンアーマー, Farukon Āmā) for X5, wanting it to resemble a bird with a beak-shaped chest piece, wings coming out of the back, and a talon-like arm cannon. Suetsugu designed the Gaea Armor, which was meant to resemble Sanagiman from the Inazuman manga series. In Mega Man X6, Suetsugu aimed to make the Blade and Shadow Armors look stylish. Another armor based on the Ultimate's design was made for X to wear in Mega Man X Legacy Collection's "X Challenges" mode. The three main characters were revised for Mega Man X8 as Yoshikawa wanted to give them more unique features to contrast their personalities.

For Mega Man X: Command Mission, Capcom felt that X looked too simple and wanted to alter his design. Higurashi was originally skeptical about the changes requested, but assistant producer Tatsuya Kitabayashi came to favor the reworked design, as it reflected how X had matured after facing several hardships. The staff noted X's overall characterization as conflicted, having a pacifist nature while also killing enemies. As a result, they decided to make a strong yet kind character in order to appeal to fans, turning him "into a full-fledged hero". Based on his points of view from the original Mega Man X, Higurashi wanted fans to see X and Zero as dark archetypes of heroes rather than typical ones. Nevertheless, the developers were afraid of a negative backlash if the fans found X and Zero to be too different from their original personas. The character redesign involved a "beam scarf" that could be produced whenever X performed a dash. By the time the remake was made, the team decided to stick to Suetsugu's style rather than Yoshikawa's revision from Mega Man X8.

For Mega Man Zero, Yoshihisa Tsuda jokingly suggested making the original X the final boss, an idea that was accepted at first. According to director Ryota Ito, Inti Creates realized that it "wouldn't sit so well with the young boys and girls that really do see [X] as a hero", so they replaced him with Copy X one month before release. Although Mega Man X8 was released before the first remake, Capcom chose to go with X's previous design, as it was more well-known. The original X was meant to interact with the Zero from Mega Man Zero in the video game Rockman XZ: Time Rift before its cancellation.

X and Zero were to appear in the cancelled game Maverick Hunter alongside a new human sidekick, who would be a "Bruce Willis-like police officer." and part of the game's "man versus machine contrast". Maverick Hunter was intended as the first of a trilogy of games; players would play as X in the first two games, switching to Zero in the third game to destroy X, who had become "incredibly powerful and infinitely intelligent over the course of two games".

In the spin-off Mega Man X Dive, X was given a new armor, Dive Armor X, by Keisuke Mizuno based on his own proposal. In making it, he adjusted some parts of the original design of the icon size equipment picture when he graphed it as the armor. In addition, according to the character's setting, he added in eye-catching elements that had not been seen in the series before, such as floating wings and the inner armor and joints glowing. The idea to give X wings was supported by the hardware the mobile game was on. Mizuno expressed the original Ultimate Armor and the Mega Man X8 armors as his favorites and expressed a desire to draw them himself. For the game, X was given his own rival, χ-kai-, as an April Fool's Day joke. However, popular response to it led to the inclusion of the character.

=== Voice actors ===
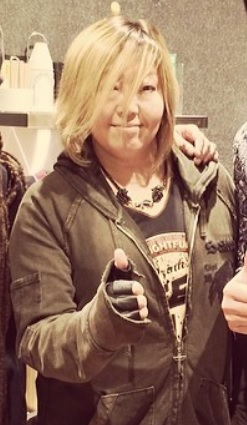
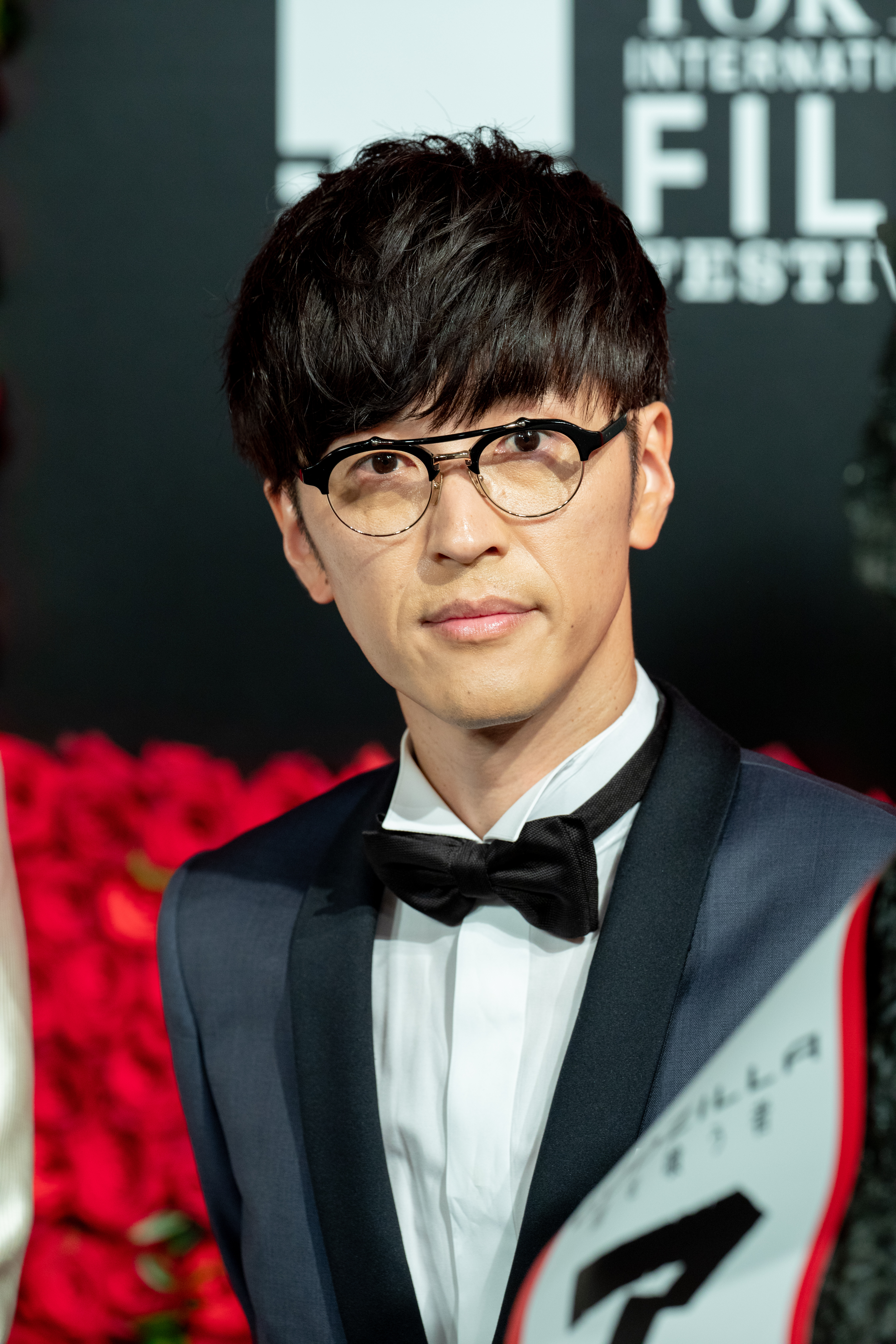
Megumi Ogata (left) was X's first Japanese voice actress, while Takahiro Sakurai has held the role since Mega Man X: Command Mission.

Megumi Ogata was the first to voice X, with the role being listed on her website. Setsuo Yamamoto got Ogata to voice X's yell when performing the Hadoken special move in the first game. She considered the role to be a "first generation part" of her career, alongside other series such as Yu-Gi-Oh!, as she voiced X and Yugi Mutou in their debuts and was later replaced. In Mega Man X4, X was voiced by Kentarō Itō, later replaced by Showtaro Morikubo in subsequent works. Morikubo found the role to be challenging, as he was also debuting as a musician during the release of Mega Man X5.

Since Mega Man X: Command Mission, Takahiro Sakurai has been the fourth actor to voice X. He enjoyed voicing X in the crossover Project X Zone. Sakurai described X as a serious character who "hesitates and agonizes, but always keeps fighting. I still recall those feelings when acting as X. He is always fighting, not just against Mavericks but also something inside himself that he can't avoid. ... Anyway, as a gamer going all the way back to the NES, it'll be a bit like a dream world having this great variety of characters joining in." In X8, Sakurai befriended Rumi Kasahara, the voice actress for Alia, who offered to help him. Sakurai wished to sound like Kentarō Itō during the recordings. For Maverick Hunter X and its OVA, Sakurai decided to portray X as a more human-like character as he still did obtain the motivation to fight.

In the Zero series, Takahiro Mizushima voiced X in the drama part of its remastered tracks, also voicing Model X in the ZX series.

In English-language productions, X has had multiple voice actors. Ruth Shiraishi, who voiced Mega Man in Mega Man 8, voiced X in Mega Man X4. Mega Man 8 and X4 were recorded in the same session, and Shiraishi did not know her session was for two separate games. For X, Shiraishi believes that they altered her voice somewhat to sound older the Mega Man. Peter von Gomm voiced him in Mega Man X7, while Mark Gatha replaced him in the next game, as well as the first game's remake and the original video animation The Day of Sigma. Gatha was hired by Ocean Studios in Vancouver starting with Command Mission and became known for voicing X, as he owns merchandise from X he got in Japan and one of his colleagues asked him to sign his PlayStation Portable for Maverick Hunter X. Ted Sroka voiced X in the fighting game Marvel vs. Capcom Infinite, expressing joy when his role was revealed.

Reactions to X's voice-acting have been mostly negative. Sushi-X of Electronic Gaming Monthly and Hilliard criticized his child-like voice in Mega Man X4 as a poor fit for his character. Mike Wilson of RPGFan likened Mark Gatha's performance in Command Mission to that of a boy scout, while Parish, writing for 1Up.com, remarked that his performance in Mega Man Maverick Hunter X "sounds frothingly pissed-off all the time and feels the need to shout the name of his special weapons every single time he uses them".

== Reception ==
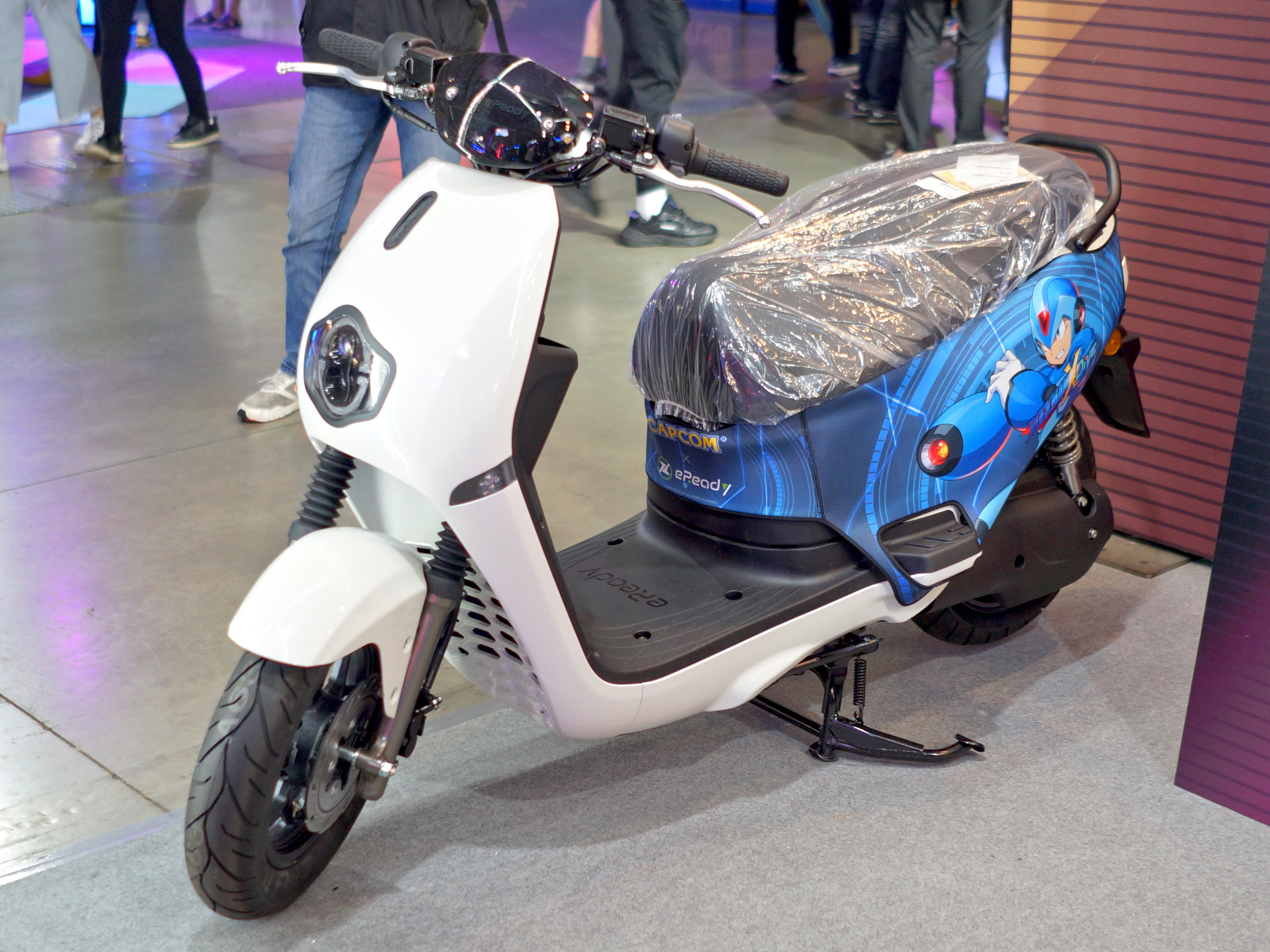
Taipei Game Show 2022 bike featuring artwork of X.

Critical reactions to X have been positive, with reviewers considering him a worthy successor to the original Mega Man and praising his skills, design, and connection to a more significant storyline. Push Square regarded X as a more anime-like and serious take on his predecessor, designed to appeal to a wider demographic. The fact that X can wear various suits of armor that make him stronger received multiple responses from the media regarding which was the best based on looks and abilities. Justin Koreis of Eurogamer considered X one of the most tragic heroes in gaming history, citing his melancholic outlook on fighting in contrast to the gamer's personal satisfaction; despite knowing the brutality of war, he is willing to fight and kill Reploids, even if it costs him his humanity. He also noted that X's portrayal is different from other video game mascots like Mario or Sonic the Hedgehog, who are portrayed in a more lighthearted way. X's relationship with Zero was noted as standing out in the first game, as Zero suffers serious damage fighting Vile and Sigma is revealed to have survived. While the consumer would enjoy playing the game and its sequels, in the story these actions would have lasting consequences, as X is forced to continue fighting despite his regrets. Marshall Honorof of The Escapist attributed the series' success to X's easily recognizable design and his connection to an elaborate storyline with several chaotic yet bloodless situations. Capcom producer Kazuhiro Tsuchiya played the first Mega Man X in his youth, enjoying X due to his new skills helping to popularize the "golden age of action games". In a 2024 Capcom popularity poll, X was voted as the third best character in the male category.

Heather Alexander of Kotaku compared X's lamentation of his actions to similar soldiers such as 2B from Nier Automata, who finds herself in a endless cycle of violence, and Raiden from Metal Gear, who questions the nature of his missions. Alexander expressed feeling guilty upon completing the game, as the final narration highlighted X's depression over the chaos of war. Michael McWhertor of Polygon pointed out the heavier themes of the Mega Man X series, specifically X's struggle with the morality of fighting other Reploids, and said that his empathy for humanity made him unique. MagMix noted that X stands out within the franchise for his sensitive personality despite his skill, to the point that the manga based on the series shows him crying, as well as his design being more elaborate than previous heroes and contrasting with Zero and Sigma. X was also noted as being a more innovative character for his skills in the games. The manga series by Iwamoto Yoshihiro helped enrich X's character through his interactions with fellow Maverick Hunters and the notable violence. Rosângela Fachel de Medeiros of Universidade Regional Integrada do Alto Uruguai e das Missões observed that in Mega Man Maverick Hunter X, while X is portrayed as a weakling due to being the only Reploid in the world capable of expressing human emotions due to his potential to develop as he fights for society. The writer noted that the original video animation The Day of Sigma places great emphasis on X's desire to avoid violence despite his strength to fight for others. X's lack of early inclusion in Mega Man X7 led to negative response.

There was also commentary about X's Command Mission persona by Anthony Hubeny from Stockholm University, who stated that, though Z initially comes across as a stereotypical hero written for a young audience due to the lighthearted premise, the plot takes a dark turn on several occasions when harm befalls X or his allies, resulting in X taking on a more realistic persona where the group is more serious. As a result, Hubeny viewed X as a knight holding virtues, who tries to talk to the enemy before resorting to violence and often displaying noteworthy chivalry. MagMix was drawn into Command Mission thanks to X's new design and the bonds formed between him and his allies as the story progresses until its ending, which would surprise the audience.

Other comments focused on the character outside the franchise. Regarding Mega Man Zero, Jeremy Parish of US Gamer and Patrick Lee of The A.V. Club pointed out that the original plan to make X become a villain marked a dark turn in Capcom's games because it involved Zero working to kill X, the former protagonist of the series, and the eventual revelation that the original X had seemingly already died. Tom Goulter of GamesRadar referred to both X and Zero as "crossover veterans" and looked forward to their role in Project X Zone. Kyle Hilliard of Game Informer stated that X and Zero were among his favorite characters in gaming and expressed his desire to play as them in the sequel, Project X Zone 2. Magmix noted X had the funniest interactions with fellow character Phoenix Wright from Ace Attorney such as the former asking the latter if can create firepower out of his attorney badge. The cancelled X was compared by Destructoid to Bomberman in Bomberman: Act Zero and Metroid Prime's design, noting that the art style did not change much, while X's redesign was "virtually unrecognizable."

In a comparison of the three main characters from Mega Man X8, Luthfie Arguby Purnomo from Studies on Shift noted that X's weapons symbolized his status as a cultural hybrid in contrast to the Western Axl and the Eastern Zero. When compared with Zero in general, X was often seen as the less compelling character. This was reflected in the decision to have Zero represent the Mega Man franchise in Marvel vs. Capcom 3 instead of the original Mega Man or X, with director Ryota Niitsuma citing Zero's moves as more interesting. For the fighting game Marvel vs. Capcom Infinite, X was included due to his significant popularity with Western audiences. Allegra Frank of Polygon noted that this was well-received by fans, though many were displeased with his early defeat in a preview. While acknowledging X's fame, Game Informer wanted the protagonist to be in a crossover with the series Metroid due to their similarities in game design and creatures.
