= Thumpers =

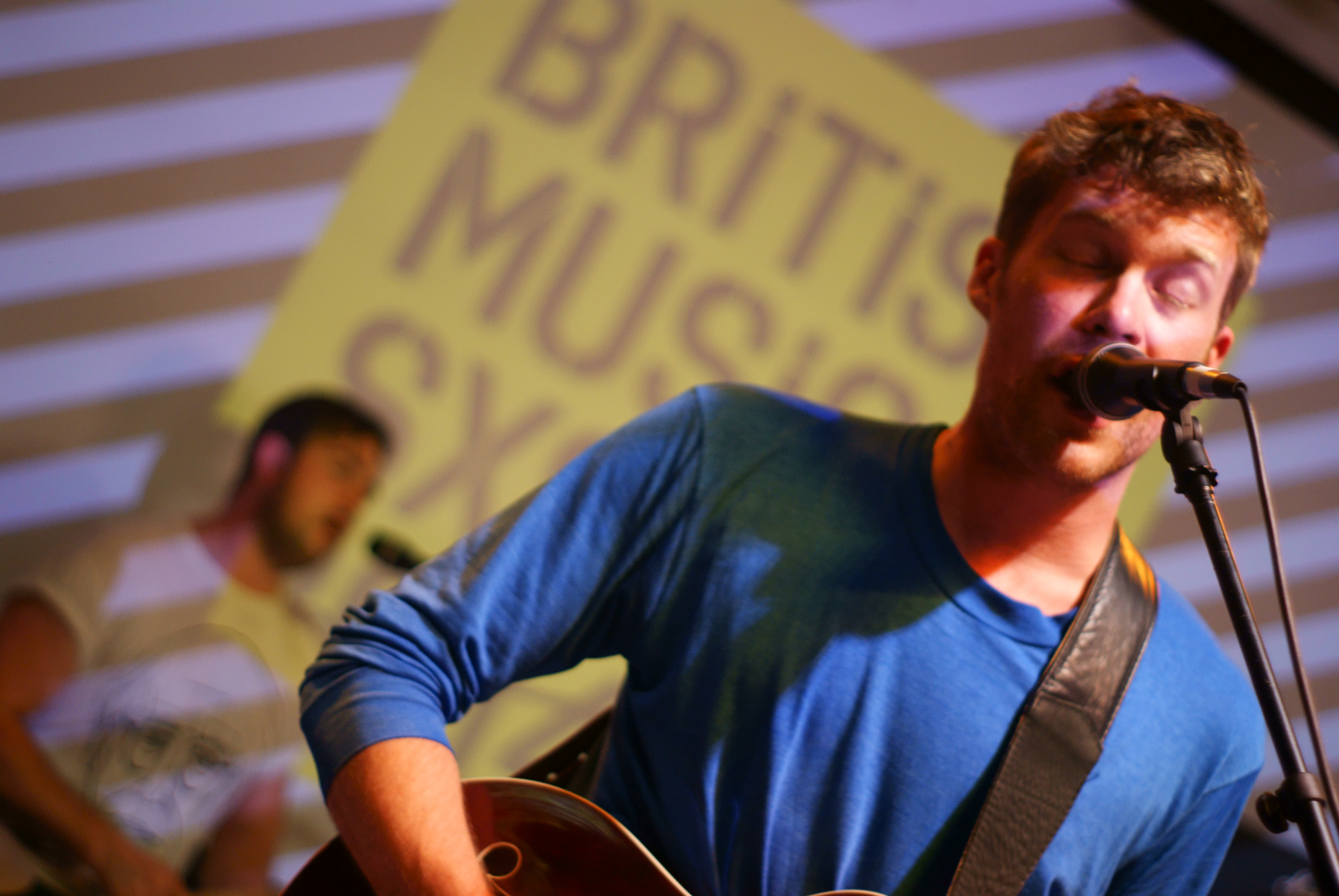
- Thumpers at Latitude 2014

Background information
- Origin: London, England, United Kingdom
- Genres: Indie pop, synthpop
- Years active: 2012–2018
- Labels: Sub Pop Records, Transgressive, Paradyse, Kissability
- Members: Marcus Pepperell; John Hamson, Jr.
- Website: thumpers.co

Thumpers were an indie pop duo based in London and formed in late 2011. Their first track, "Sound of Screams", appeared online in April 2012 and their debut, sold out show followed in September 2012 at the Sebright Arms in Hackney.

== History ==
Childhood friends Marcus Pepperell and John Hamson Jr., who were previously in alt indie bands Antihero and Pull Tiger Tail, regrouped in 2012 after their previous band fell apart due to unsolvable issues with their management and label. After Pull Tiger Tail's split, Hamson went on to play drums with Noah and the Whale before playing bass and percussion with Friendly Fires on their Pala world tour. During this time the two began writing music that would become the first Thumpers songs via email.

Thumpers' first single was "Dancing's Done" which was released on limited edition rose-tinted vinyl and cassette tape through Transgressive Records imprints Paradyse Records and Kissability Records in February 2013. The track achieved B-list status on the BBC 6 Music playlist, as well as strong support on BBC Radio 1, Xfm and Amazing Radio. Pepperell's sisters sing on all recordings to date.

On 28 October 2014, the band released the track "Devotee" featuring vocals from actress Jena Malone; which was featured alongside 2 more new tracks on an EP titled "Together", released on 9 November of the same year.

On 23 November 2016, the band released new material for the first time in just over 2 years, a track titled "Gargantua", and also announced plans to release a second LP in 2017.

The band announced on 15 February 2018 that they were splitting up, with their show at The Lexington in London on the 23 February being their last. An EP, titled "Life All In", was also released on the same day.

== Live performances ==
Live the duo are joined by an interchanging cast of friends and musicians to bring their collective sound to the stage. The band have shared stages with the likes of Slow Club, Two Door Cinema Club, Chvrches, Kwes., MS MR, and July Talk.

== Discography ==
- "Dancing's Done EP", Paradyse Records/Kissability Records (4 February 2013)
- "Unkinder EP", Transgressive Records (3 June 2013)
- Galore, Sub Pop (US)/True Say! Recordings (UK) (2014)
- "Together EP", (9 November 2014)
- Whipped & Glazed, True Say! Recordings (1 September 2017)
- "Life All In EP", True Say! Recordings (23 February 2018)
