= Whipped & Glazed =

Studio album by Thumpers
- Released: 1 September 2017
- Genre: Indie pop, synth-pop
- Length: 39:52
- Label: True Say! Recordings
- Producer: John Hamson Jr.; Marcus Pepperell

Thumpers album chronology
Galore (2014)	Whipped & Glazed (2017)

Singles from Whipped & Glazed
- 1. "Gargantua" Released: 25 November 2016; 2. "Boundary Loves" Released: 15 June 2017; 3. "Caramel" Released: 12 July 2017; 4. "'99'" Released: 17 August 2017; 5. "Life All In" Released: 15 February 2018

Professional ratings
Review scores
Source	Rating
DIY	3/5 stars
The Line of Best Fit	7/10

Whipped & Glazed is the second and final studio album by British duo Thumpers. It was released on 1 September 2017 under True Say! Recordings.

== Track listing ==
No.	Title	Length
1.	"World Removed"	5:38
2.	"Gargantua"	3:41
3.	"'99'"	3:16
4.	"Wolf Ways"	3:10
5.	"Caramel"	3:34
6.	"That Waterfall"	4:44
7.	"Life All In"	3:27
8.	"Bray"	4:33
9.	"Boundary Loves"	4:51
10.	"Shot Through"	4:58
Total length:		39:52

Bonus cassette tape tracks
No.	Title	Length
11.	"Tenor"	3:40
12.	"Still Life"	2:48
13.	"Monolith"	3:59
14.	"World Removed (Reprise)"	3:09
Total length:		52:08
