= Galore (Thumpers album) =

Studio album by Thumpers
- Released: 11 February 2014
- Genre: Indie rock, indie pop, synth-pop
- Length: 44:16
- Label: Sub Pop
- Producer: David Kosten

Thumpers chronology
Galore (2014)	Whipped & Glazed (2017)

Singles from Galore
- 1. "Unkinder (A Tougher Love)" Released: 24 September 2013

Professional ratings
Aggregate scores
Source	Rating
Metacritic	71/100
Review scores
Source	Rating
AllMusic	3.5/5 stars
Drowned in Sound	7/10
Exclaim!	5/10
The Line of Best Fit	9/10
musicOMH	2.5/5 stars
NME	2.5/5 stars
Pitchfork	6.0/10
Under the Radar	8/10 stars

Galore is the debut studio album by English duo Thumpers. It was released in February 2014 under Sub Pop Records.

The US release of this album does not contain the title track, having eleven tracks total.

== Track listing ==
No.	Title	Length
1.	"Marvel"	2:38
2.	"Dancing's Done"	3:17
3.	"Sound of Screams"	3:45
4.	"Unkinder (A Tougher Love)"	3:42
5.	"Come on Strong"	4:07
6.	"Now We Are Sixteen"	4:31
7.	"Tame"	4:11
8.	"Galore"	3:56
9.	"The Wilder Wise"	4:37
10.	"Roller"	3:27
11.	"Running Rope"	4:39
12.	"Together Now"	5:22
