= Mega Man X (video game) =

1993 video game

- North American SNES box art
- Developer: Capcom (Note: MS-DOS version developed by Rozner Labs.)
- Publishers: JP/NA: Capcom; EU: Nintendo
- Producer: Tokuro Fujiwara
- Designers: Yoshinori Takenaka; Keiji Inafune; Sho Tsuge; Masahiko Kurokawa
- Programmers: Keiji Kubori; Kouichiro Nakamura
- Artists: Keiji Inafune; Hayato Kaji; Kazunori Tazaki; Tatsuya Yoshikawa
- Writers: Keiji Inafune; Sho Tsuge
- Composers: Setsuo Yamamoto; Makoto Tomozawa; Yuki Iwai; Yuko Takehara; Toshihiko Horiyama
- Series: Mega Man X
- Platforms: Super NES, MS-DOS, Windows, mobile phone, Android, iOS
- Release: December 17, 1993: Super NES; JP: December 17, 1993; NA: January 1994; EU: May 1, 1994 MS-DOS; NA: March 10, 1995 Windows; JP: May 25, 1996 Mobile; JP: March 1, 2007 Android; JP: November 18, 2011 iOS; WW: December 21, 2011
- Genre: Platform
- Mode: Single-player

Mega Man X (Note: Known in Japan as Rockman X (ロックマンX, Rokkuman Ekkusu)) is a 1993 platform game developed and published by Capcom for the Super Nintendo Entertainment System. It was the first Mega Man game for the 16-bit console and the first game in the Mega Man X series, a spin-off of the original Mega Man series that began on the Super NES's predecessor, the Nintendo Entertainment System. The game takes place a century after the original Mega Man series, and is set in a futuristic world populated by both humans and "Reploids", robots capable of thinking, feeling, and growing like their human creators. Because of these complex attributes, many Reploids are prone to destructive, renegade activity and are thereafter referred to as "Mavericks". The plot of the game follows the protagonist X, the last creation of Dr. Light and an android member of a military task force called the "Maverick Hunters". With the help of his partner Zero, the last creation of Dr. Wily, X must stop Sigma, a powerful Maverick leader, from taking over Earth and committing genocide against humanity.

With the transition to more advanced gaming hardware, series artist Keiji Inafune explained that the development of Mega Man X involved reinventing Mega Man through gameplay expansion and a more mature storyline while still maintaining the basic concepts on which the franchise was built. Much like the NES Mega Man games that came before it, Mega Man X is a platform game where the player takes control of the eponymous character and must complete a set of eight, initial stages in any order desired. Defeating the boss character at the end of each stage grants the player one new weapon that can then be toggled and used at will for the remainder of the game. However, Mega Man X adds a number of new features and makes radical changes to the original gameplay mechanics of previous releases in the series. These include allowing the player to dash along the ground, scale walls, and obtain armor attachments which grant special abilities.

Mega Man X has met with positive reviews for its gameplay, sound, and graphics, as well as its attempt to augment the aging Mega Man franchise. Some critics have listed it as one of the greatest video games ever made. A longterm commercial success on the SNES, Mega Man X has since been ported to personal computers (PCs) and mobile devices, included in the North American Mega Man X Collection for the GameCube and PlayStation 2 (PS2), and released on the Virtual Console download service for the Wii, the Wii U, and the New Nintendo 3DS. The game also received a remake on the PlayStation Portable (PSP) titled Mega Man Maverick Hunter X. Nintendo re-released Mega Man X in September 2017 as part of the company's Super NES Classic Edition, and iam8bit re-released the physical SNES version in September 2018 in celebration of Mega Man's 30th anniversary. The game is also included in the Mega Man X Legacy Collection for the PlayStation 4, Xbox One, Nintendo Switch, and Windows. A sequel, Mega Man X2, was released in 1994.

== Plot ==
Mega Man X takes place in an unspecified time during the 22nd century (21XX) and approximately 100 years after the original Mega Man series. A human scientist named Dr. Cain discovers the ruins of a robotics research facility that had once been operated by the legendary robot designer Dr. Thomas Light. Among the ruins, Cain finds a large capsule which contains a highly advanced robot with human-level intelligence and emotions, and even free will, the likes of which the world has never seen before. Light had wished to instill within his creation reasonable sanity, good nature, and an understanding of the more controversial aspects of human morality. The robot was buried while running a 30-year diagnostic program to ensure these features. However, because of his old age, Dr. Light died before these 30 years ended, and his final creation ended up sealed for 100 years instead of 30. Cain spends the next several months studying the robot, who is named "X". Cain decides to duplicate X and, within several months, completes the first "replicate android" or "Reploid", a robot who can think, feel, learn, and grow exactly like a human. Within the year, the design is standardized and Reploids are mass-produced. However, with the free will given to a Reploid comes the possibility of criminal activity; such rogue Reploids are branded as "Mavericks" by law-abiding citizens.

As the public outcry against the few Maverick incidents becomes too great to deny, the government steps in, and under the advice of Dr. Cain, forms an elite military police organization called the "Maverick Hunters". The Hunters are to capture or disable any Reploids that pose a threat to humans, provide damage control at Maverick uprisings, help with disaster recovery, and perform other tasks as needed. To lead this group, Cain designs a very advanced Reploid, thought to be immune to whatever defect causes Mavericks. This robot, named Sigma, heads the Hunters for some time before ultimately becoming a Maverick himself, alongside the vast majority of the other Hunters, most of whom join him out of loyalty. Sigma seizes control of a small island, driving out all human occupants. Claiming that the humans are inferior and that they are limiting the growth and potential of Reploids, he calls for his followers to begin a massive extinction effort. X, guilt-ridden at having helped design such a dangerous race, joins forces with the only other remaining Hunter, Zero, to stop Sigma at any cost.

While on a mission involving a Maverick attack on a highway, X encounters Vile, a mercenary Maverick working for Sigma who pilots a mechanized tank called "Ride Armor". Unable to defeat Vile, X is saved at a critical moment by Zero, forcing Vile to retreat. Zero then offers encouragement to the less combat-savvy X after the battle. X proceeds to track down and exterminate eight of Sigma's most powerful Mavericks, then rendezvous with Zero outside Sigma's stronghold. Inside the compound, X finds that Zero has been captured by Vile. Another battle ensues, ending similar to their first meeting with X at Vile's mercy. Zero suddenly breaks free of his restraints, latches onto Vile, and self-detonates, destroying his own body and the Maverick's Ride Armor. Shocked over Zero's sacrifice, X regains his strength and finishes off Vile. Zero encourages his comrade once again, and succumbs to his damage. Now more determined than ever, X fights his way to Sigma, destroys the Maverick leader, and escapes the island fortress as it explodes and sinks. As he returns to base, X reflects on the events that have unfolded, questioning Zero's sacrifice, his own decision to fight, and the ongoing war with the Mavericks. After the credits, a message from Sigma reveals that X merely destroyed a temporary body and that Sigma's spirit lives on. Sigma then says that he would gather new, stronger bodies to do his bidding, and he would see X soon.

== Gameplay ==
The player character X evades enemies in Armored Armadillo's stage.

The original Mega Man series on the NES consisted of 2D platform games that focus on run-and-gun gameplay. Mega Man X uses the same basic principles as its precursors but with many added options. The player takes control of the protagonist X, and, after completing an introductory stage, is presented with a stage selection screen that depicts eight boss characters. Each stage is littered with various enemies and hazards and ends with a boss battle against its respective Maverick. Defeating a Maverick allows X to use that Maverick's signature weapon. The player may attempt these eight levels in any order, using weapons gained in one level to overcome challenges in the others, although some bosses will be much easier if challenged after having beat another boss and obtaining their signature weapon. There are certain orders to challenge the eight levels that make it easier for the player. For example, clearing Storm Eagle's aircraft carrier stage will cause electrical outages in Spark Mandrill's power plant stage which removes several hazards throughout the stage. The player can return to the game at a later point using a password system; the password will retain any number of the eight stages cleared and most power-ups. In certain stages, X can hop inside Ride Armors to fight enemies; ride Armors are bipedal tanks capable of powerful punches.

X's abilities are similar to those in previous Mega Man games, such as running, jumping, and a chargeable arm cannon named the "X-Buster". However, Mega Man X introduces a number of elements not present in the original Mega Man titles. One prominent feature is the ability to scale, slide down, or jump off nearly any wall. Certain stages contain Armor Part Capsules, which display a holographic message from Dr. Light when approached. Each capsule upgrades one of X's body parts—his legs, armor, or helmet, granting the player improved defense (armor), as well as new abilities, like a dash upgrade (legs) and the ability to smash blocks (head). The player can also collect hidden "Heart Tanks" that extend X's maximum life energy and "Sub-Tanks" that can store extra energy for later use. When certain conditions are met, a secret capsule can be unlocked which gives X the ability to perform the "Hadouken", an attack used by characters (Ryu, Ken, Akuma, Sakura, Gouken) from Capcom's Street Fighter series.

== Development ==
Mega Man X was developed by a team at Capcom which had worked on the long-running Mega Man series for the NES. Lead artist Keiji Inafune (credited as a planner as Inemuryar) recounted that the development of Mega Man X required a lot of brainstorming for its storyline and content where the team's goal was to branch out from original Mega Man games while still maintaining their fundamentals. In the original Mega Man series, Inafune typically designed the protagonist while his protégé Hayato Kaji handled the supporting characters. However, their roles were reversed for Mega Man X. Kaji (credited as Rippa H.K) illustrated the protagonist X, but had a difficult time with the initial design. He was presented with much more freedom than he was accustomed with the SNES's larger palette of colors when compared to the NES. Inafune and Kaji worked simultaneously on the various designs for X with different pieces of armor attached. The idea for the armor parts came about because the game was planned during a time when role-playing video games were becoming extremely popular. Inafune felt that Mega Man had always represented a classic action game formula in which the hero earns his defeated enemies' abilities; the armor parts were added to supplement this concept.

Inafune created the character Zero, whom he originally intended to be the game's main, playable protagonist. "When the X series came out, I really wanted to redesign Mega Man," Inafune explained. "I wanted a totally different Mega Man. I'm a designer, a creator; I wanted something new. I didn't want to use the same old Mega Man." Fearing a negative reaction from fans, Zero was ultimately reduced to a role secondary to X. The development team additionally wanted the world of Mega Man X to be much more sophisticated than in the first Mega Man series. They wanted to accomplish this with Zero's "hardcore" personality and the game's antagonist Sigma. As stated by Inafune, the original series' villain Dr. Wily had "a side to him you couldn't really hate". Sigma, however, was written as a once-good character suffering an "unforeseen error" that leads him to be completely evil. The game's story went through several changes during development. Two allies of X, named RX and RY, appeared in previews for the game, but were later taken out. Mega Man X altered the franchise tradition of having themed boss characters with a "Man" moniker by replacing them with anthropomorphic animal-like androids. The art and pixelization for these eight bosses were divided among three illustrators: Inafune did Storm Eagle and Chill Penguin; Kaji did Spark Mandrill, Launch Octopus, and Sting Chameleon; and Kazunori Tazaki (credited as Ikki) did Flame Mammoth, Armored Armadillo, and Boomer Kuwanger. The team was careful in making the bosses distinct from one another in both stature and coloring. Tatsuya Yoshikawa (credited as Tatsunoko), a fourth artist who had recently been hired by Capcom, was given the task of assisting the rest of the team by designing, illustrating, and creating the sprites for the game's minor enemies.

The musical score for Mega Man X was composed by Capcom's Alph Lyla group. Setsuo Yamamoto (credited as Setsuo) was initially the sole composer assigned to the game, and contributed the vast majority of the soundtrack, but four other composers, Yuki Iwai (credited as Sato), Toshihiko Horiyama (credited as Kirry), Yuko Takehara (credited as Yuko) and Makoto Tomozawa (credited as Tomozou), were brought in late in production to help finish the soundtrack. The first three were responsible for one track each. These tracks were Chill Penguin, Password Screen, and Boomer Kuwanger, respectively. Tomozawa wrote two songs, these being Storm Eagle and Spark Mandrill. Iwai and Horiyama would later compose the soundtracks for Mega Man X2 and X4 respectively. The Japanese division of Sony Records published an arranged album featuring ten songs on March 9, 1994. Music using the SNES instrumentals was included as part of the Capcom Music Generation: Rockman X1 ~ X6 soundtrack released by Suleputer in 2003.

The success of the Mega Man series allowed Capcom to continue releasing NES titles well into the 16-bit era. A teaser for an SNES incarnation of the Mega Man series first made its way into a preview of Mega Man 6 in the spring 1993 issue of the Japanese Club Capcom fan magazine. Mega Man X was announced in North America in a March 1993 Game Players magazine interview with Capcom's Senior Vice President Joseph Morici. The tentatively titled "Super Mega Man" was originally to have a "fairly large memory configuration and a battery backup". The autumn 1993 issue of Club Capcom announced Rockman X for a December 1993 release in Japan, divulged several plot and gameplay details, and showed Zero as a silhouetted "Blues-like character". Leading up to its release, the game was covered by the North American press surrounding the summer 1993 and winter 1994 Consumer Electronics Shows.

== Reception and legacy ==
Reception

Aggregate scores
Aggregator	Score
GameRankings	SNES: 88.50%
Metacritic	iOS: 55/100

Review scores
Publication	Score
Electronic Gaming Monthly	9/10, 9/10, 9/10, 9/10
Famitsu	7/10, 6/10, 6/10, 7/10
GameFan	89%, 82%, 89%, 87%
IGN	9 out of 10
Nintendo Life	9 out of 10
Game Players	95/100
Super Play	88%
M! Games	76/100

Mega Man X has been widely acclaimed by critics since its release. Gaming magazines in the United States and Europe including Electronic Gaming Monthly (EGM), GamePro, Game Players, Nintendo Power, Super Play, and the German version of Total! consistently lauded the game's visuals, audio, control, and overall gameplay. Game Players summarized Mega Man X as "a near-perfect cart with classic gameplay, excellent graphics and sound and tons of hidden items and power-ups". Nintendo Power stated that the game had "great control and fun" along with "challenging play". In Japan, the four reviewers in Weekly Famitsu commented on the games difficulty. Three found it less difficult than earlier Mega Man games, but still very high with one reviewer saying "The tension of being close to death was good...to a point." while another only recommended the game fans of the earlier games.

Websites such as IGN, GameSpot, GamesRadar, and 1UP.com retrospectively held Mega Man X as a successful milestone in transitioning the Mega Man series from its increasingly stale existence on the NES to the SNES. Brett Elston of GamesRadar stated, "X was a total reinvention of the series, a perfectly executed update that had fans anticipating its release with a fervor the franchise hadn't seen since the Mega Man 2 and 3 days."

Mega Man X received criticism from some publications as well. Ed Semrad, Danyon Carpenter, and Al Manuel of the EGM review panel all noted that the game may have too low a difficulty level; Semrad disliked the introductory stage and felt that the game was too short as well. Super Play editor Zy Nicholson lowered his review score of the game because he found the levels were neither large nor challenging. "A few elementary tricks like repeating easy sections to recoup energy and weapon power will see you through the harder bits," Nicholson explained. "Within the level you'll also find restart points, extra lives, and no harsh time limit to put pressure on your performance. Couple this with a password system that records your level completion, status and weapon accumulation and you'll see we're not looking at a lasting challenge for the experienced player." Nintendo Power criticized how little the game had changed stating that "the theme remains the same as the Game Boy and NES Mega Man titles."

The game's title initially proved a source of some confusion; the gaming media reported that many gamers mistook the "X" for the roman numeral 10.

Mega Man X was ranked number 58 in Nintendo Power's "100 Best Nintendo Games of All Time" in its 100th issue in September 1997, number 103 in the publication's "Top 200 Games" list for its 200th issue in February 2006, and the 11th best SNES game of all time in its August 2008 issue. Both GamesRadar and ScrewAttack listed Mega Man X as the eighth best game in the SNES library. GamePro similarly listed it as the eighth greatest 16-bit video game. Game Informer considered it the 120th best game of all time in its own 200th issue in December 2009. IGN named it the twelfth-best on its own top 100 SNES games list in 2011. In 2018, Complex listed the game 15th on their "The best Super Nintendo Games of All Time." They felt the game was one of the best games in the Mega Man X series. In 1995, Total! rated the game 28th on its Top 100 SNES Games.

Mega Man X was a commercial success. The SNES version sold 1.165 million copies worldwide as of 2001, making it the 41st best-selling Capcom game of all time. IGN's Jeremy Dunham speculated that the game's more mature storyline and its inclusion of numerous gameplay extensions over the original Mega Man series helped create a "unique cadre of fans". The game was followed by seven direct sequels and three related titles: Mega Man Xtreme, Mega Man Xtreme 2, and Mega Man X Command Mission. Another video game spin-off series, Mega Man Zero, began in 2002 on the Game Boy Advance handheld as a result of the immense popularity of the character Zero.

== Re-releases and remakes ==
After the SNES version debuted, Mega Man X was ported by Rozner Labs to the IBM PC for MS-DOS in 1995 and was packaged with a six-button game controller. Mega Man X received a separate PC release for Windows in Japan in 1996, based on the North American MS-DOS version. Majesco republished the SNES version of the game in 1997. Nintendo also republished the game in Japan on its Nintendo Power cartridge service in 1998. Mega Man X, alongside its next five direct sequels and Mega Man: Battle & Chase, was compiled and made available on the Mega Man X Collection in North America for the GameCube and PS2 in 2006. An enhanced remake titled Mega Man Maverick Hunter X, or Irregular Hunter X (イレギュラーハンターX) in Japan, was released worldwide for the PSP between 2005 and 2008. With the launch of the PSP, Keiji Inafune and his team debated on whether or not to create a Mega Man X9. "So, we decided that instead of going the X9 route, let's go back to the series' roots and rediscover what makes the X series so classic," Inafune concluded. "We felt that the best way to do that would be to make an X remake." Although the remake stays true to the original game in both gameplay and basic storyline, Maverick Hunter X features a total graphical overhaul with 3D character models and backgrounds, a remixed soundtrack, voice acting, and anime cutscenes. According to Yoshikawa, the character illustrations were updated to resemble both toys and the designs of Mega Man X8.

In addition to these changes, many power-ups in Maverick Hunter X, such as the armor capsules, are relocated to different levels. The remake also has a few extras including an original video animation titled "The Day of Sigma" (which serves as a storyline prequel) and an unlockable mode to play through the game as the character Vile. Inafune implemented this mode to offer players a new perspective on the game through the eyes of a villain, feeling it would be "too obvious and boring" given an option to play as Zero.

Like the original game, Maverick Hunter X has received very positive reviews from critics, accumulating aggregate scores of 82% on GameRankings and 79 out of 100 on Metacritic. Although the game did not meet sales expectations, it was later made available as a download from the PlayStation Network. The Japanese and North American versions were also bundled in a special compilation with Mega Man: Powered Up, a remake of the original Mega Man.

Capcom released a port of Mega Man X onto FOMA and i-mode compatible mobile phones in Japan in 2007. Mega Man X has also been made available for purchase on the Virtual Console service in Japan and North America in 2011 for the Wii, and later in Europe in 2012, as well as for the Wii U in 2013 and the New Nintendo 3DS in 2016. The game was ported to the Android operating system in Japan as a free download on November 18, 2011. Another remake of Mega Man X was released on the Apple iOS (iPhone and iPod Touch) on December 21, 2011. This version is based on the mobile phone version of the game and features touch controls, Game Center support, and a challenge mode with 80 levels. However, this version removed extra life power-ups, and separated the levels into chunks by black screen transitions, as opposed to the continuous scrolling of the original. Weapon and armor upgrades could also be purchased with actual money to ease the game's difficulty. It also features a purchasable option to switch to the Maverick Hunter X soundtrack, composed by Kento Hasegawa, Seiko Kobuchi and Shinya Okada.

Nintendo re-released Mega Man X in September 2017 as part of the company's Super NES Classic Edition.

Mega Man X was announced for PC, PlayStation 4, Xbox One, and Nintendo Switch as part of Mega Man X Legacy Collection (Rockman X Anniversary Collection in Japan) which was released on July 24, 2018, worldwide and July 26, 2018, in Japan and also possesses an optional high-resolution filter to create higher-resolution graphics for this game. In addition, the Day of Sigma OVA from Maverick Hunter X is available as part of this release, which is also available on Mega Man X Legacy Collection 2 as well.

In May 2018, iam8bit announced it would re-release the original SNES cartridge version in September in celebration of Mega Man's 30th Anniversary. The release was limited to 8,500 copies, with 7,500 produced in opaque light blue cartridges and 1,000 in glow-in-the-dark translucent blue, and each color in a random box. The instruction booklet of the re-release features a foreword by Jirard "Dragonrider / The Completionist" Khalil and packaging restoration by Jango Snow Art & Design.
