= Zero (Mega Man) =

Fictional character in Mega Man

- Mega Man character
- Zero as he appears in Mega Man X5
- First game: Mega Man X (1993)
- Created by: Keiji Inafune
- Designed by: Keiji Inafune; Toru Nakayama (Zero series)
- Voiced by: English: Wayne Doster (Mega Man X4); Jack Merluzzi (Mega Man X7); Lucas Gilbertson (2004–2006); Jamie West (Mega Man ZX Advent); Johnny Yong Bosch (2011–present); Japanese: Ryōtarō Okiayu (1997–present); Yūto Kazama (Mega Man Zero series, SvC Chaos)

In-universe information
- Species: Android
- Weapon: Z-Saber

Zero (Japanese: ゼロ) is a fictional character present throughout much of Capcom's Mega Man franchise. He is an android and the final creation of the original series' main antagonist, Dr. Wily. Zero debuts in the Mega Man X series as an elite member of the Maverick Hunters, an organization dedicated to defending humanity and good Reploids from evil Reploids known as Mavericks. Zero also acts as a mentor and longtime friend to X, the main protagonist of the X series. He is also the titular main protagonist of the Mega Man Zero series, and has a supporting role in other series in the franchise, such as the Mega Man ZX series. He has also appeared in crossover video games as a guest character.

First developed by Keiji Inafune when he was attempting to create a new design for the X series, Zero was instead used as a secondary character. In the Zero series (developed by Inti Creates), he was the protagonist and had a change in his design that was meant to impart a more "human feel" to him. He also has a minor role in the ZX series as Model Z.

His inclusion in the Mega Man X series has generally received positive critical response from reviewers for his role as a mentor and colleague to X and further development of his character arc. His story within the Mega Man Zero series received similar response, partly because he became darker and more mature compared to previous Mega Man characters.

== Appearances ==
=== In Mega Man video game series ===
Zero debuted in Mega Man X in 1993 and as a cameo appearance in Mega Man 2: The Power Fighters. In the latter, he was revealed to have been originally created by Dr. Wily sometime during the Mega Man series. In the X series, Zero works as a Maverick Hunter, a soldier in charge of defeating Mavericks, robots who turned against humanity. He is X's comrade and best friend in the X series, and the two, later accompanied by Axl, fight Sigma, Vile, and other enemies. In the first two titles, he assists X during gameplay, but becomes a playable character in X3, albeit limited in gameplay.

Zero debuts as a fully playable character in Mega Man X4, where he fights the rebellious Repliforce and is forced to kill an old friend in the process, Iris. In his scenario, Zero is haunted by nightmares of a shadowy figure awakening him and giving him orders to destroy an unknown individual, and visions of ensuing carnage. Additionally, during his scenario, Sigma reminds him of when he led the Maverick Hunters and the encounter between the two that led to a vicious battle. In this battle, Sigma punched out the crystal on Zero's helmet, which later on caused Sigma to become infected with the Maverick Virus. In Mega Man X5, Sigma, implied to be acting on information from Dr. Wily, damages the planet with a massive quantity of the Sigma Virus in a bid to re-awaken Zero's original malicious nature. Depending on the story development, Zero can be fought as a boss character. In Mega Man X6, he is not initially present due to being presumed dead at the end of Mega Man X5 after the battle with Sigma. However, he can be found alive and obtained as an optional character depending on how the story develops throughout the game. He is one of the two initial playable characters in Mega Man X7, along with Axl, and also appears in Mega Man X8 as a playable character along with X and Axl. In the spin-off title Mega Man Xtreme, he is an assistant character but becomes playable in the sequel, Mega Man Xtreme 2. He is also playable during the prologue and the last chapters from the role-playing video game Mega Man X: Command Mission. A mobile phone game, Mega Man X DiVE, also features Zero as a playable character.

The Mega Man Zero series features Zero as the title character. Set around 100 years after the X series, an amnesiac Zero awakens from stasis and helps a scientist named Ciel fight the human city of Neo Arcadia, which is persecuting the Reploid race over an energy crisis. Zero eventually convenes with the spirit of X, now a Cyber-Elf, and fights the latter's doppelgänger Copy X, the Four Guardians of Neo Arcadia, and ultimately Dr. Weil and his companion Omega. Zero learns that Weil was responsible for initiating the Elf Wars that led to the world's current dystopian state, and that Omega is his original body, stolen by Weil. Zero ultimately sacrifices himself to destroy Weil, ending the conflict between Reploids and humans. He is later reincarnated as a Biometal, Model Z, who plays a minor supporting role in the plot in the first ZX game. As well, he appears in ZX Advent, but has an even smaller role, only having a few lines of dialogue. Zero's Mega Man Battle Network counterpart, Zero.EXE appears in Mega Man Network Transmission as the antagonist of the first half of the game. He later aids Mega Man against the true villain, The "Professor".

Zero also reprises his role from the first game in three mangas by Iwamoto Yoshihiro, and the prequel Irregular Maverick Hunter X by Ikehara Shigeto. This version in the former is depicted as having full hair and is constantly taking off his helmet compared to the original games.

=== Other appearances ===
The Mega Man Zero version of Zero appears as a sub-boss in SNK's crossover fighting game SNK vs. Capcom: SVC Chaos and as a hidden character in Onimusha Blade Warriors. The Mega Man X version of Zero appears as a hidden character in Tatsunoko vs. Capcom: Ultimate All-Stars and as a playable character in Marvel vs. Capcom 3: Fate of Two Worlds, Ultimate Marvel vs. Capcom 3, Marvel vs. Capcom: Infinite, and Teppen. and as a pair unit with X in Project X Zone and its sequel Project X Zone 2. In the Marvel vs. Capcom 3 titles, Zero was chosen to represent the "Mega Man" franchise over Mega Man himself, as director Ryota Niitsuma thought he had more variation in his moves. Zero also appears as a collectable trophy in Super Smash Bros. for Wii U, and as an Assist Trophy in Super Smash Bros. Ultimate. Both games feature a Mii Fighter costume based on Zero as downloadable content.

Zero's appearances in the two manga series based on the Mega Man X series resemble his video game portrayal. However, in the Mega Man Zero manga, Zero is depicted as a Reploid having two personalities depending on his usage of a helmet: without his helmet he is portrayed as cowardly, whereas the other one resembles his video game counterpart. Zero also makes guest appearances in the Mega Man comic series by Archie Comics, appearing in stories set shortly before the events of Mega Man X and as part of the "Worlds Unite" crossover event.

== Conception and creation ==
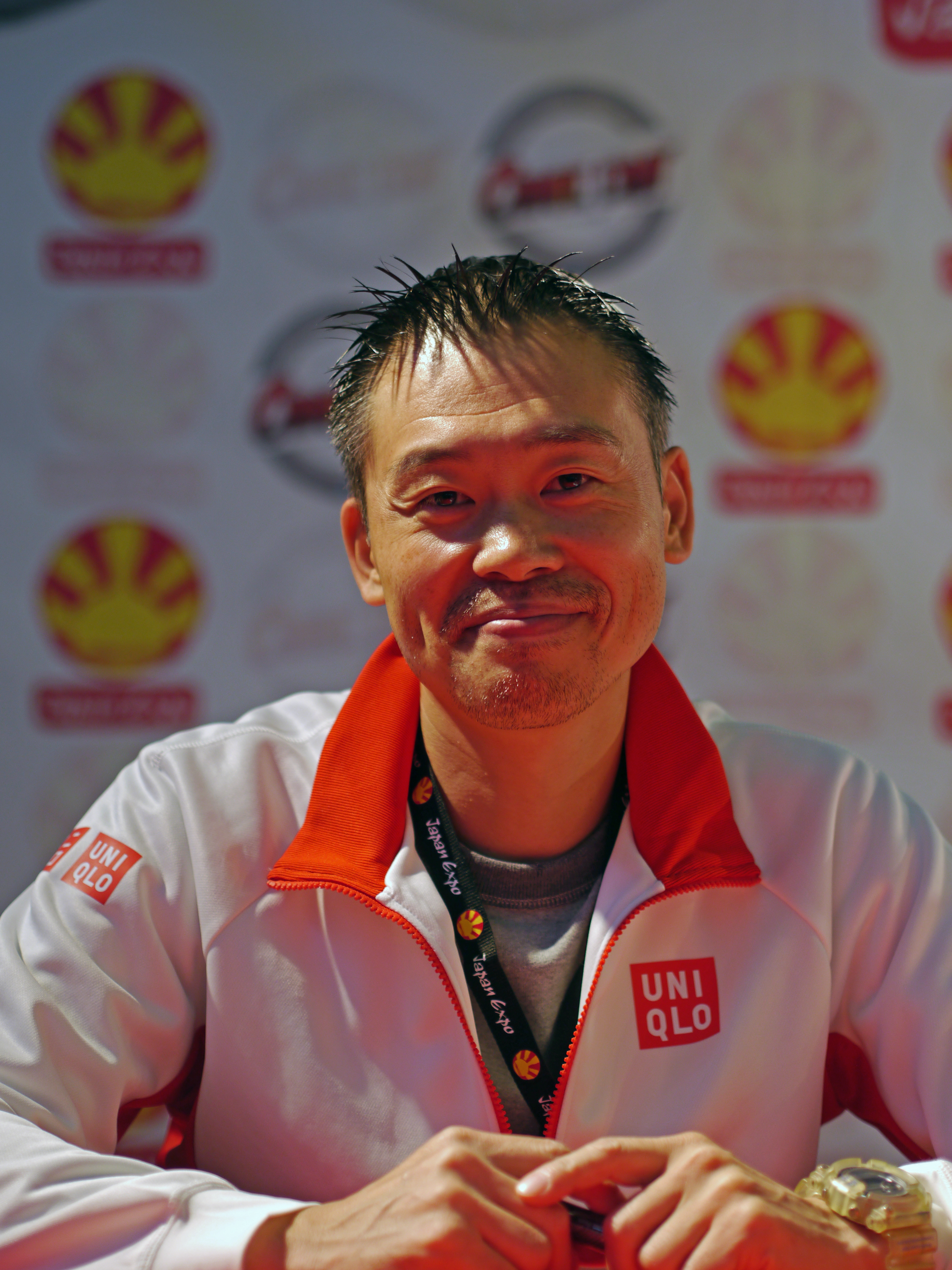
Keiji Inafune, creator of Zero.

Zero was created by designer Keiji Inafune when he was told to recreate Mega Man for a new series on the Super NES, Mega Man X. He wanted to design a Mega Man different from the original one. However, Inafune realized afterwards that the character he created was too different from Mega Man's old appearance to be viewed positively by fans. Deciding to let another designer work on the character that eventually became X while he developed Zero, Inafune created the character intending him to be "the 'other main character' that would "steal all the good scenes". He further described Zero as representing the idea that "nothing is absolute", and circumstances can change anything. When asked if Zero had killed the cast of the original Mega Man titles, suspected due to their absence in the X series, he replied no, adding that given how he had designed the character, "Zero is not such a person--it is not in his profile."

Believing they were too similar in Mega Man X3 (in which Zero could only be played as for part of each level), Capcom wanted Zero to be further distinguished from X for his first appearance as a fully playable character in Mega Man X4. This resulted in the removal of his Z-Buster (his equivalent of X's X-Buster), leaving only his lightsaber-esque Z-Saber. This close-range combat weapon stood in stark contrast to X's projectile weapons. Due to the difficulty of playing as Zero, the vast majority of the developers were against that decision at first during Mega Man X4. As a result, Zero was given special techniques (some of which hailed from the Street Fighter franchise) by defeating each boss, which resulted in the approval from the developers. In order to make Zero's story more engaging, Capcom created Iris, a female Reploid, believing it was a fresh idea not used in previous games in the series. Ever since the series started, Inafune wanted to add Dr. Wily to the story leading to the twist of Mega Man X4 that reveals he created Zero to set the climax of the series.

The concept of Zero starring in his own series was proposed by Inafune. Inafune proposed that Zero star in his own series, and planned to go forward with the idea at the end of Mega Man X5. However, he was unable to after Capcom announced another Mega Man title without his involvement. Designed by Toru Nakayama of Inti Creates, Zero was meant to have a more "human feel" rather than the complete "mechanical feel" of the X series. Nakayama wanted the public to recognize that this series was different from the X series. Since Capcom wanted Zero's general structure to be the same, Inti-Creates concentrated on how different they could make him, rather than how similar. Zero's depiction in the series was intended to be morally ambiguous and depend on the perspective, appearing as a hero from one point of view and a terrorist from another.

Ever since the series' beginning, Haruki Suetsugu was impressed by the handling of the relationship X and Zero had. From his point of view, X was a character who often makes mistakes in combat yet tries again in order to improve. As a result, the artist felt he could relate with X. X was written to be a "B class" Hunter in contrast to Zero being "Special A" rank. This allowed him the draw more frequently across the series. Nevertheless, he regretted some of his illustrations as X lacked the cool appeal Zero originally had. Based on his points of view from the original Mega Man X, Higurashi wanted fans to see X and Zero as dark archetypes of heroes rather than typical ones. Nevertheless, the developers were afraid of a negative backlash if the fans found X and Zero to be too different from their original personas.

Inafune drew inspiration for Zero from the arcade game, Strider, a previous Capcom game. Inafune has stated that he has always liked the "world view" of Strider and modeled the name of Zero after one of its characters (reportedly, Solo).

Yoshihisa Tsuda discussed in interviewed that one of the floating ideas, there was a concept where Zero could have originally been Roll, who was kidnapped and modified by Dr. Wily to become the foundation for his creation. This concept never finalized became Zero was officially established as his own independent character, and the idea that he could be Roll was considered "too hardcore" and ultimately discarded. Tsuda confirmed that it was an exploratory idea during the chaotic and experimental development phase of X2.

=== Design ===
In the Zero series, Zero was redesigned to look both sleeker and more human.

Designed to be "harder and wilder" than the original Mega Man, Zero's design ultimately resembled X in several ways due to his initial character concept, Inafune's insistence on drawing the character, and input from other project artists. In the X series, Zero has red and white armor with twin "horns" on his helmet. This was found challenging to animate in Mega Man X4 as the pixels are meant to be divided between his red armor and long blond hair. Zero also has his signature long blonde hair. Starting with Mega Man X2, Zero received a slight redesign. His shoulders were given plating with a "Z" symbol on his left shoulder, his armor was made to be slightly bulkier, and his chest and foot parts got additional gold plating. Zero also started wielding his signature weapon, the Z-Saber, an energy-based sword that introduced melee combat to the Mega Man games. His original, now secondary weapon is the Z-Buster, a cannon mounted at the end of his right arm, similar to X's X-Buster. A tertiary weapon that would orbit around Zero was also considered, but left uncompleted. Unlike the original Mega Man, who had a full head of hair under his helmet, Zero has a smooth secondary helmet, intended to imply the characters were older. In Mega Man X4, Zero was going to receive his own enhanced armor in the same way X does, but the development team decided not to finish it.

In the Zero series, Zero sported a much more humanized and sleeker redesign. His mecha-inspired armor was eschewed for a red uniform consisting of a vest, gloves, and boots, while his arms and legs were more anatomically detailed. His Z-buster was no longer fused inside his hand, instead it was a handgun, Buster Shot, that fired energy bullets. The Z-Saber also became a triangular holographic blade, rather than a lightsaber-like weapon. Early concept art featured Zero with solid-black, pupil-less eyes, though this changed to a normal set of eyes as development progressed.

Keisuke Mizuno designed Zero's Dive Armor for Mega Man X Dive. It was designed based on the in-game armors and fused together. Mizuno thought it turned out to be quite innovative because the previous Zero looks did not have horns. Unlike the several armors X always wears, the ones from Zero proved to be challenging to design since Zero's regular form was made to be more complex than X's. As a result, Mizuno thought about the iconic parts of Zero, which parts symbolize Zero, and which parts are the most important and must be kept when the shape of his body changes. The head and the silhouette were the most important ones to create while also retaining the common colors. In order to make Zero Dive Armor more appealing, Mizuno made the character a dual-wielding fighter in the process.

=== Casting ===
Ryōtarō Okiayu has been Zero's voice actor in the Mega Man X series since its fourth installment. He was grateful for the role he was given to do mostly in the crossover Project X Zone. Lucas Gilbertson stated that he did not think of Zero as a robot but instead as a swordsman, making his work enjoyable. While finding it challenging, Gilbertson liked yelling during recordings, something that was common in Zero's character. Another aspect the actor enjoyed was the staff member he worked with and thus expected to voice Zero in the future.

== Critical reception ==
Zero's character was met with positive critical response by publications for video games. Game Revolution called him "mysterious, androgynous" and compared him to Proto Man "with a ponytail". In retrospect, DenfamincoGamer said the most likely explanation behind Zero's inclusion in the series his popular characters in the Mega Man X series. In particular, Mega Man X4, in which he was promoted to the second protagonist, delved into his past and inner struggles, and, coupled with the passionate performance of Okiayu, who solidified his popularity. Zero's differences with the original Mega Man and X helped making his character more unique leading to the creation of his own series.

Jeese Scheeden from IGN enjoyed his sword-wielding characters in the video games, describing him as an answer to the question of how Mega Man would fight if armed with a sword, and noted his fighting style as popular with gamers. GameZone writer Michael Knutson praised the inclusion of Zero in the Mega Man X series, citing his playability as popular amongst series fans as it expanded the gameplay. GameSpot editors Christian Nutt and Justin Speer stated that X3 benefited from the addition of Zero as a limited playable character as previous games from the franchise only used both Mega Man and X. In regards to Zero's powers, Game Informer claimed Zero had the best weaponry in X6 based on the multiple extra abilities he had before defeating any boss character. Jeremy Parish from 1UP.com stated that his appearance as a playable character with his own story in Mega Man X4 by itself made it the best game in the X series. GameSpot noted the contrast in his gameplay to that of X in Mega Man X4 increased the difficulty of using him in the title. Additionally, Brett Elston from GamesRadar credited Zero as one of the reasons the X series became so popular and that his own popularity within gamers earned him his own video game series. GamesRadar also cited Zero's actors across the X series, finding the first from X4, Wayne Doster, unappealing due to his infamous scene where he yells in front of the dead Iris. On the other hand, the site praised Yong Bosch's take on the character, believing it was likable. The fandom in general found the scene where he yells "What am I fighting for?!" as one of the worst parts in voice acting in Mega Man history alongside some cutscenes from Mega Man 8 to the point of calling it a "horror". While reviewing Mega Man X: Command Mission, 1UP.com criticized that his English voice acting makes him "sound like a surfer" and lamented his poor screentime. By the time of Mega Man X6, Destructoid criticized Zero's role in the story as he had been killed twice ever since his debut and once again is revived. His closer relationship with X was also the subject of negative responses, comparing them to fanfictions.

IGN repeated their positive sentiments about Zero in their list of characters they wished to see appear in a future Marvel vs. Capcom title, describing him as "arguably cooler than Mega Man", regardless of version in comparison. PSM praised the character as well, stating "[he] might wear some funky shoes, but that doesn't stop him from kicking some robot butt". When compared with Zero, X was often seen as the less compelling character, with Zero being the more memorable of the two. His relationship with Iris has been regarded as that of a star-crossed due to the tragic story of Mega Man X4.

In regards to his Mega Man Zero incarnation, GameSpot believed the character's redesign was well employed based on his presentation. IGN considered Zero's retake be like a breakout character due to how he develops his own skills unlike previous versions of the Mega Man cast. Destructoid simply described Zero as "a red death machine who uses pistols, lightsabers, shields, and multiple other melee weapons..." due to his dark characterization when compared with previous main characters. Nevertheless, Nintendo Life noticed that across Zero's spin-off, the title Reploid continuously showed a character arc that would make him more likable to gamers, earning the spotlight for the first time based on how he was originally a side character. Similarly, US Gamer referred to Zero to have one of the more elaborated story arcs in the Mega Man franchise in general due to how he changes between the X series and the Mega Man Zero. The writer further added that the apparent misrelationship between Zero and X before the revelation that the latter was a clone gone corrupted was one of the darkest things seen in Capcom's games due to the idea of Zero working to kill X, the former protagonist of the series. Joel Couture from DeadXP said that while Mega Man X offered a far darker narrative than original Capcom franchise, Mega Man Zero tests the player's morale by giving them power ups to Zero but in the form of Cyber-Elves composed of child-like robots rather than X's armors that show no life.

Zero's connections with the original Mega Man characters have been the subject of speculations within fans. As it is believed that Dr. Wily created Zero in the image of Protoman or the possibility that he was responsible for multiple deaths offscreen as it is unknown what happened to the original Mega Man cast, explaining their absence in the X storyline. In 2018, Capcom left clues about how Wily dies when creating Zero but the idea of Zero killing the Mega Man characters was negated. GamesRadar regarded both X and Zero "crossover veterans" based on their multiple appearances and looked forward to their team up in Project X Zone where the duo teamed up for the first time in a crossover. Game Informer considered X and Zero as one of his favorite characters in gaming, and thus wanted to play as them in Project X Zone 2. In a comparison of the three main characters from Mega Man X8, Luthfie Arguby Purnomo from Studies on Shift noted that X's weapons symbolized his status as a cultural hybrid in contrast to the Western Axl and the Eastern Zero.
