= Mega Man X4 =

1997 video game

- North American cover art
- Developer: Capcom
- Publishers: WW: Capcom; EU: Virgin Interactive Entertainment
- Producers: Keiji Inafune; Yoshinori Takenaka
- Designers: Koji Okohara; Mitsuru Endo; Hiroyuki Yamato
- Artists: Masako Honma; Haruki Suetsugu
- Composer: Toshihiko Horiyama
- Series: Mega Man X
- Platforms: PlayStation; Sega Saturn; Windows; Mobile phone
- Release: August 1, 1997: PlayStation; JP: August 1, 1997; NA: September 25, 1997; EU: October 13, 1997 Saturn; JP: August 1, 1997; NA: October 1, 1997 Windows; JP: December 3, 1998; NA: 1998 Mobile phone; JP: December 1, 2011
- Genre: Platform
- Mode: Single-player

Mega Man X4 (Note: Known in Japan as Rockman X4 (ロックマンX4, Rokkuman Ekkusufō)) is a 1997 platform game developed and published by Capcom. It is the fourth game in the Mega Man X series and the first game in the series to be released on the Sega Saturn and PlayStation. The two versions were released simultaneously in Japan in 1997. A North America release followed sometime thereafter, while Europe received only the PlayStation version in 1997. Mega Man X4 allows the player to choose between the two protagonists at the beginning of the game: X, who uses an arm cannon; or Zero, who wields an energy blade.

Taking place in the 22nd century, the Mega Man X series is set in a society populated by humans and intelligent robots called "Reploids," which are branded "Mavericks" if they commit crimes. Two Maverick Hunters, X and Zero, fight against a Reploid army called the "Repliforce" who are waging war against humanity to earn their independence. Development of the game started due to Capcom's desire to explore the franchise in a new hardware which proved to be difficult as they aimed to make the two protagonists unique when playing. Xebec produced the animated cutscenes.

Critical reception for Mega Man X4 has been generally positive. Critics praised the ability to play as either X or Zero, a concept many found to expand upon the then perceived exhausted gameplay formula of the Mega Man X sub-franchise during the 1990s. However, it was criticized for its lack of innovation and the notoriously poor quality of its English voice acting. In addition to its console versions, the game was released on Windows worldwide in 1998 and 1999 and on Japanese mobile phones in 2011 and 2012. It was in compilations for the PlayStation 2 and GameCube in 2006, the PlayStation Network in 2014, and the Nintendo Switch, PlayStation 4, Windows, and Xbox One, as part of Mega Man X Legacy Collection released in 2018.

== Gameplay ==
The player character X moves through the military train that makes up Slash Beast's level. The player's energy and remaining lives are displayed at the top left.

The gameplay in Mega Man X4 is similar to the previous installments of the Mega Man X series. The player is presented with a series of action-platforming stages that can be cleared in any order desired. In these stages, the player must avoid obstacles like falling debris and spikes, and destroy enemy robots to reach the end of the stages. Some levels contain ridable vehicles such as hover bikes called Ride Chasers and mechs called Ride Armors. The player character's maximum health can be extended by obtaining a "Heart Tank" in each of the eight stages. Two "Sub Tanks" can also be found, which can be filled with life energy and then be used to replenish the player's health at any time.

New to Mega Man X4 is the ability to play through the game either as X or Zero fully, (while Zero was playable in Mega Man X3, he acted only as a backup for X). The two characters cannot be switched during a playthrough. Though both of them go through the same stages, they operate differently and are challenged differently from the terrain. X wields the "X-Buster", a plasma cannon on his arm that he uses to attack foes from a distance. It can be charged to fire stronger shots. A new weapon is given to the player with each boss defeated while playing as X. These weapons have limited ammunition. In some stages, the player can find hidden capsules that contain armor upgrades that greatly enhance X's capabilities. Zero is more melee-oriented than X by using a "Z-Saber" sword. Rather than acquiring weapons from the bosses (with the exception of his Giga Attack), Zero learns special techniques that do not require ammo such as the "Hienkyaku" air-dash and "Kuuenbu" double-jump. However, Zero cannot upgrade any of his body parts in this game.

== Plot ==
Mega Man X4 takes place in an ambiguous year in the 22nd century (21XX), where humans coexist with intelligent androids called "Reploids". A second Maverick-hunting group has been formed to supplement the Maverick Hunters, though its relationship with the humans is tenuous. The army, called the "Repliforce", is a military regime led by the giant Reploid General and his second-in-command, Colonel. The storyline differs slightly depending on whether the player chooses X or Zero.

In the game's introduction, the Sky Lagoon, a massive floating city, is attacked by a Maverick and sent crashing down onto the city below it, killing countless humans and Reploids. At the crash site, Zero rescues Iris, Colonel's kind-hearted sister, who was caught in the mayhem but is unharmed. X and Zero then encounter Colonel, suspicious of his presence, and attempt to bring him back to Maverick Hunter HQ for questioning. Colonel denies Repliforce's involvement in the Sky Lagoon destruction, and refuses to disarm out of pride. The Repliforce thus begins a movement to claim independence from the human government and create a nation for Reploids only.

Back at headquarters, X is greeted by a rookie Hunter named Double, while Zero rendezvouses with Iris. Eight Mavericks who have sworn allegiance to Repliforce are outlined for X and Zero to eliminate. One of them, ex-Hunter Magma Dragoon, reveals that he caused the Sky Lagoon incident for a chance at fighting X and Zero, but hints that he was working for someone other than Repliforce. Once all eight Mavericks are beaten, X and Zero are sent to a space port where Colonel guards Repliforce's launch into outer space; Colonel dies in the ensuing battle. X and Zero infiltrate the Repliforce's space station, known as the Final Weapon. X must fight Double, who is revealed to be a double agent sent to gain information from the Hunters, while Zero is forced to battle Iris, who is torn between her brother's dream and love for Zero. Zero kills Iris in the confrontation, which causes him to break down in an existential crisis. The genocidal Maverick Sigma then reveals he orchestrated the Sky Lagoon crash and sent Dragoon and Double to instigate the conflict between the Maverick Hunters and Repliforce. Additionally in Zero's scenario, Sigma reminds him of the time that Sigma led the Maverick Hunters, and of Zero's origin as a Maverick that led to vicious battle between the two where the Maverick Virus passed from Zero to Sigma. In the end, Sigma is destroyed, but reveals he already activated the Final Weapon. General then appears and sacrifices himself to destroy the Final Weapon, allowing X and Zero to escape and return to Earth. As they escape, X begs Zero to promise to kill him should he become a Maverick, but he does not answer. Meanwhile, Zero is wrought with pain and guilt for being unable to save any of the Repliforce members, most notably Iris.

== Development and release ==
Originally, the Mega Man X3 team had no plans to provide a sequel until their superiors from Capcom aimed to try the X series on new hardware. The team aimed to make Zero different from X, he was remade as a proper samurai-like warrior who wields a Z-Saber instead of shooting like X. In order to get the approval to make Zero playable, the developers gave him special moves based on the Street Fighter fighting game series to compensate for lacking X's powers. In particular, Capcom struggled in the beginning with the number of backgrounds they had to draw, but were pleased with results. There were twice as many sprite animation patterns to create. Since there was too much data creating the player characters, they had to employ a compression routine to store it all, and divide the stages into two sections. Designing X's armors proved difficult since the character looks different depending on which parts the player obtains first.

Instead of designing the game's various pieces of artwork as he had done in the past, Keiji Inafune focused his attention on being a producer. He was also involved in creating the game's storyline, a role he described as "only slightly less than it was for X1". Instead of presenting Repliforce as blatantly evil villains like Sigma, the writing staff decided to leave them some "moral leeway". They did not want the ideals of Repliforce and the Maverick Hunters to be so black-and-white. Since the main theme involved Reploids fighting each other, Capcom decided to avoid featuring human characters, calling it "Robots and The Future". Inafune left his former design responsibilities up to other artists that had previously worked on the Mega Man X series. Artist Haruki Suetsugu did not design its characters as he would do for later games in the series, but was given drafts in order to draw illustrations for promotional purposes. An unknown author was responsible for designing X's secret "Ultimate Armor" featured in both the game after inputting a cheat code and as a Japanese Bandai action figure. In regards to Zero, Suetsugu noted that while he looked appealing, his drawings overshadowed X. Meanwhile, he lamented how brutal was the story of the heroine Iris. Suetsugu spent four days coming up with the initial blueprint. After tinkering with the Mega Man X3 armor parts, he noticed that attaching them in specific ways made it look like an airplane. He recounted creating the armor as an extremely difficult yet fun task. Zero was intended to have his own Ultimate Armor, but the development team chose to not finalize it.

The FMV cutscenes in Mega Man X4 were produced by IG Port's subsidiary Xebec. The game's musical score was composed by Toshihiko Horiyama. The score features the opening theme "Makenai Ai ga Kitto aru" (負けない愛がきっとある; lit. "Unbeatable Love I Surely Have") and the closing theme "One More Chance", both sung by Yukie Nakama. All of the game's instrumental and vocal music was compiled on the Capcom Music Generation: Rockman X1 ~ X6 soundtrack released by Suleputer in 2003. The theme songs were also included on the Rockman Theme Song Collection, published by Suleputer in 2002.

Mega Man X4 was initially developed as a Sega Saturn exclusive and slated for a June 1997 release, but it was delayed and made multi-platform. Both console versions of Mega Man X4 were released in Japan on August 1, 1997. The cover art for the Japanese Saturn version depicts Zero standing alone in a dark setting. Inafune stated this idea was weird, there was a still a group of hardcore fans wanting this. A "Special Limited Pack" edition of the game included the Ultimate Armor X action figure.

The American localization of the Mega Man X4 PlayStation version was originally put on hold after Sony Computer Entertainment America denied Capcom permission to release it in the United States, reportedly due to their policy against 2D games. However, after persistent talks with the company, Capcom finally convinced Sony to allow the game a release. According to a Capcom spokesperson, the reasoning behind the delay was that Mega Man X4 "had just gotten lost in Sony's back log of games waiting for approval". The PlayStation version was released on August 1, 1997 in North America, while the Saturn version came out in the early part of the following week. Customers who preordered either version of the game through Capcom's online store were given a Mega Man X4-themed T-shirt. Capcom's designated European distributor, Virgin Interactive Entertainment, opted not to release the Saturn version in Europe, though the PlayStation port was released in that region on October 13, 1997. It was later ported to Windows in 1998 in Japan. A Japan-exclusive Windows reissue by MediaKite Distribution in 1999. A mobile port focused on X was released on December 1, 2011, while the Zero version on January 5, 2012.

== Reception and legacy ==
Reception

Review scores
Publication	Score
Computer Gaming World	2/5 (PC)
Electronic Gaming Monthly	8/10, 8/10, 8/10, 9/10 (PS); 9/10, 8/10, 8/10, 8/10 (SAT)
Famitsu	25/40
GameFan	88/100 (SAT)
GamePro	19/20 (PS); 15.5/20 (SAT)
GameSpot	7.0/10 (PS); 6.8/10 (SAT)
IGN	7/10 (PS)
Next Generation	3/5 (PS)
PlayStation: The Official Magazine	4/5 (PS)
Dengeki PlayStation	60/100, 90/100
Saturn Power	80% (SAT)
Sega Saturn Magazine	91% (SAT)
Computer Games Magazine	1.5/5 (PC)

Reviews for the PlayStation and Saturn versions of Mega Man X4 have been generally positive. Critics praised the added option to play through the game as either X or Zero, noting that the drastic differences in the way the characters played the same levels added to the game's replay value. However, most of the same critics concurred that Mega Man X4's 2D side-scrolling gameplay was tired and overdone well before the game was released. In particular, GamePro and Next Generation both gave it mixed reviews on the sole basis of its perceived lack of series innovation; GamePro asserted that "the gameplay's none removed from Mega Man for the NES - things are just a little bigger and a little louder," while Next Generation suggested that those interested in the game should instead "pick up Mega Man X3 in the used bin for a third of the price, since you won't miss much." However, a different GamePro critic reviewed the PlayStation version and gave it a resoundingly positive review, calling it "an impressive 32-bit debut" and "a definite must-have for any action gamer's library." GameSpot took more of a middle ground, concluding that "All in all, a few more 3D effects would have been nice, but the decision to stick with a true 2D environment is bold, if somewhat outmoded. Aesthetically, Mega Man X4 is a sizeable improvement over its predecessors, but you must remember that it's only a side scroller."

A number of critics also praised the intuitive and responsive controls, gigantic bosses, and solid challenge. John Ricciardi of Electronic Gaming Monthly differed on the last point, saying that the stages are too easy, but added that "the overall experience is definitely a positive one." Electronic Gaming Monthly listed the console versions at number 78 on its "100 Best Games of All Time" in the 100th issue of the magazine in 1997, the same issue in which they reviewed the PlayStation version, citing its "significant improvement over X3, with amazingly detailed 2-D graphics, well-balanced (although slightly easy) gameplay and an awesome story with very well-acted animated cut scenes." They also listed Mega Man X4 as a runner-up for "Side-Scrolling Game of the Year" (behind Castlevania: Symphony of the Night) in its 1997 Editors' Choice Awards.

The Windows version of the game was met with much lower review scores. Tom Price of Computer Gaming World felt appeal of the game itself is limited to Mega Man and platformer fans, who likely already own at least one of the console versions of Mega Man X4. Computer Games Magazine found it superior to Mega Man X3 but without any sense of the sequel having noticeable improvements.

When it came to the story, IGN and GameSpot praised how different was X's story from Zero's as it gave the game replay value. Reactions to X's voice-acting have been mostly negative. Sushi-X of Electronic Gaming Monthly and Hilliard criticized his child-like voice as a poor fit for his character. Critics said the scene in which Zero yells "What am I fighting for?!" while holding Iris' dead body is some of the worst voice acting in the Mega Man franchise.

According to Famitsu sales information, the PlayStation version of the game sold 197,385 copies in Japan alone in 1997, making it the 61st best-selling game in the region for that year. In 2002, Capcom re-released the PlayStation version of the game as part of the North American Greatest Hits range, confirming that it had sold at least 350,000 units. Mega Man X4 has also been re-released in multiple budget versions in Japan including PlayStation the Best, PSone Books, and Sega Saturn Collection.

Despite the derision for retaining the same gameplay formula that the Mega Man franchise had been using for a decade, Capcom continued to use 2D side-scrolling for another two installments of the series, Mega Man X5 and Mega Man X6. These three games, as well as the three installments that precede them, were included on the North American Mega Man X Collection for the GameCube and PlayStation 2 in 2006. A mobile edition of Mega Man X4 for au and DoCoMo customers was made available for purchase in Japan. A version featuring X as a playable character was released in 2011; a version with Zero in 2012. Mega Man X4 was also released on the PlayStation Network for PlayStation 3, PlayStation Vita, and PlayStation Portable as part of the PSOne Classics line in 2014. Finally, Mega Man X4 was included in the Mega Man X Legacy Collection, a compilation released for Nintendo Switch, PlayStation 4, Windows, and Xbox One.
