= List of cancelled Nintendo 3DS games =

The Nintendo 3DS is a handheld game console released by Nintendo in 2011. While the platform eventually went on to be seen as a success that sold over 75 million units, its launch and early years saw the platform struggle commercially, with many third-party games being cancelled during this period. Similarly, the wild success of the Nintendo Switch's launch in 2017 led companies to abandon the 3DS in favor of pursuing Switch development. This list documents games that were confirmed for the 3DS at some point, but did not end up being released for it in any capacity.

== Games ==
There are currently 28 games on this list. (Note: This number is always up to date by this script.)

List of cancelled Nintendo 3DS games
| Title(s) | Notes/Reasons | Developer | Publisher |
|---|---|---|---|
| 140 | In June 2016, it was announced that Abstraction Games and Double Fine Productions would be porting the rhythm game 140 (2013) to PlayStation 4, PlayStation Vita, Xbox One, Wii U, and Nintendo 3DS, with the ports scheduled for release later that year. However, the Vita and 3DS ports were never released. | Abstraction Games | Double Fine Productions |
| AeternoBlade II | The game was originally announced in October 2015 for the 3DS and PlayStation Vita. In early 2017, a number of members of the development team resigned, forcing the developers to restart development, and causing them to cancel the handheld versions in favor of developing and releasing PlayStation 4, Xbox One, and Nintendo Switch versions in 2019 instead. | Corecell Technology | Corecell Technology |
| Assassin's Creed: Lost Legacy | Originally announced at the 3DS's public reveal at E3 2010, the game was cancelled internally in September 2010, and publicly announced as cancelled a year later. Ubisoft explained that it was not due to the platform's initial sluggish sales, but rather, that they felt that the 3DS's launch lineup was already crowded. The game's premise was later reworked into Assassin's Creed Revelations (2011) for the PlayStation 3, Xbox 360, and Windows, while the 3DS would never receive an entry in the series. | Ubisoft | Ubisoft |
| The Binding of Isaac | Originally released on PC platforms in 2011, a planned 3DS release was cancelled in 2012 due to Nintendo objecting to the game's "questionable religious content". After Nintendo loosened their standards in the subsequent years, the game's remake, The Binding of Isaac: Rebirth, eventually released for the New Nintendo 3DS and Wii U in 2015. | Edmund McMillen | Edmund McMillen |
| BloodRayne: The Shroud | Originally announced at the 3DS's public reveal at E3 2010, its publisher Majesco announced that development was put "on-hold" in April 2011. The game never resumed development; while no official reason was given for cancellation, publications noted that it may have been due to the poor performance of the films and deciding to focus on releasing BloodRayne: Betrayal (2011) instead. | WayForward | Majesco |
| Bomberman 3DS | An entry in the Bomberman series was originally announced at the 3DS's public reveal at E3 2010, but the title was one of a number of then-upcoming games in development by Hudson Soft that were cancelled over the course of their acquisition by Konami. | Hudson Soft | Hudson Soft |
| Bonk: Brink of Extinction | An entry in the Bonk series was originally announced at the 3DS's public reveal at E3 2010, but the title was one of a number of then-upcoming games in development by Hudson Soft that were cancelled over the course of their acquisition by Konami. | Pi Studios | Hudson Soft |
| C-Wars | While the game's Kickstarter stretch-goal for releases on 3DS, PlayStation Vita, Wii U, Linux, and Android, only the Windows and macOS versions ever released, in 2015. | Onipunks Studio | Onipunks Studio |
| Chocobo Racing 3D | A sequel to Chocobo Racing (1999) was announced for the 3DS at E3 2010. Square Enix showed little of it beyond its initial demonstration in the following years, and in 2013, announced it had been cancelled. A year later, Shinji Hashimoto stated the game had been cancelled due to quality concerns. A separate sequel was not developed until Chocobo GP for the Nintendo Switch in 2022. | Square Enix | Square Enix |
| Cult County | A multi-platform horror game announced by Renegade Kid that was to be a mix between The Walking Dead and Silent Hill 2. A combination of the game failing by a wide margin to meet its ambitious Kickstarter goal in 2014, followed by two years of financial difficulty, lead to the company's closure in 2016, and the game never materialized for any platforms. | Renegade Kid | Renegade Kid |
| DJ Hero 3D | A third entry of Activision's DJ Hero series, a spinoff of the Guitar Hero series, was announced for the 3DS at E3 2010. The game was far along in development, with a build of the game playable at E3. However, declining sales of rhythm-based music games in the late 2000s led Activision to cancel all their music based games scheduled for release in 2011, which included DJ Hero 3D'. | Vicarious Visions | Activision |
| Untitled Fire Emblem remake | Publications reported that another remake in the vein of Fire Emblem Echoes: Shadows of Valentia (2017) had been in development for the 3DS, but was one of a few games cancelled after the sales of Mario & Luigi: Bowser's Inside Story + Bowser Jr.'s Journey (2018) were so poor they caused the closure of its developer AlphaDream. While the reports noted the game could be moved to the Nintendo Switch, no Fire Emblem remakes have been released on that platform to-date. | Intelligent Systems | Nintendo |
| Gunlord | In September 2013, Gunlord (2012) developer NG:Dev.Team attempted to raise €40,000 via Indiegogo to crowdfund ports of the game to Nintendo 3DS and Wii U. However, the campaign was prematurely cancelled later that month due to slow funding progress. | NG:Dev.Team | NG:Dev.Team |
| Kaio: King of Pirates | Announced in 2012 as a project helmed by developer Keiji Inafune and his newly formed Comcept development company, the game underwent a troubled development period that lost publisher Marvelous 3.8 million dollars prior to its cancellation in 2015. | Level-5 Comcept | Marvelous |
| Kororinpa | A version of the Wii game Kororinpa was announced for the 3DS in 2010, but was one of a number of then-upcoming games in development by Hudson Soft that were cancelled over the course of their acquisition by Konami. | Hudson Soft | Hudson Soft |
| Legend of Raven (Yatagarasu) | Originally released on PC platforms in 2011 under the name Yatagarasu, game publisher Nicalis announced plans to release the game under the title Legend of Raven across multiple platforms. Initially, a 3DS version was planned, but Nicalis later reported this version was cancelled in favor of a PlayStation Vita version due to fan feedback. Plans expanded beyond just a Vita version to PlayStation 4 and Xbox One versions as well, though no versions have materialized beyond its original PC release. | Circle Edge | Nicalis |
| Mega Man Legends 3 | A third entry in the Mega Man Legends series was announced in 2010, but it was cancelled the following year. Later retrospectives from Capcom would indicate that there were internal concerns about the profitability of the game, as the prior entries did not have outstanding sales numbers, it had been a decade since the last entry in the series, and the 3DS was an uncertain new platform. | Capcom | Capcom |
| Mighty No. 9 | A high-profile spiritual successor to the Mega Man series by longtime series producer Kenji Inafune successfully raised funding for a wide variety of platforms in 2013. While announced console and PC versions released across mid-2016 to a tepid response, the versions for the 3DS and PlayStation Vita never materialized. | Comcept, Inti Creates | Deep Silver |
| Monster Tale Ultimate | In March 2015, DreamRift announced they would be releasing a remake of Monster Tale (2011) via the 3DS eShop. The remake, titled Monster Tale Ultimate, was said to feature updated graphics, sound, and gameplay. However, the remake never materialized. | DreamRift | |
| My Garden | First announced at Tokyo Game Show 2010, the game involved planting and tending to a virtual garden that could be viewed with the 3DS's stereoscopic 3D effect. The game was far enough along for publications to receive hands-on builds to play, but the game was cancelled just a month prior to the launch of the 3DS. Developer Electronic Arts cited that they "didn't feel the title would attract a large audience on that platform" as the reason for its cancellation. | Electronic Arts | Electronic Arts |
| Obscure 3 / Obscure D | A third entry in the Obscure series of survival horror video games was announced for the 3DS, among other platforms, in 2011. However, developer Hydravision Entertainment closed the following year. While a group of developers formed a new company, Mighty Rocket Studio, and decided to continue work on the game, the change of direction to more non-horror action-oriented gameplay caused them rename the game to Final Exam (2013), which did not see release on 3DS. | Hydravision Entertainment | |
| Omega Five | A horizontally scrolling shooter originally released on Xbox 360 in 2008. A 3DS version was announced in 2010, but was later one of a number of then-upcoming games in development by Hudson Soft that were cancelled over the course of their acquisition by Konami. | Natsume Co., Ltd. | Hudson Soft |
| Omori | After achieving its Kickstarter goal in 2014, its protracted development extended beyond the lifespan of the 3DS, cancelling that version of the game. It later released across many platforms, including the Nintendo Switch, between 2020 and 2022. | Omocat | Omocat |
| Retro Mystery Club Vol.1: The Ise-Shima Case | The game was initially developed for digital distribution for the 3DS and was shown for the console at the 2017 Tokyo Game Show. It was subsequently released in Japan for the Nintendo Switch, PlayStation 4, and PC in 2019 and was not released for the 3DS prior to the closure of the Japanese eShop in March 2023. | Happy Meal | Flyhigh Works |
| Saints Row: Drive-By | A smaller-scale entry in the Saints Row series was announced as a download-only title for PlayStation 3, Xbox 360, and 3DS at E3 2010. After rumors of its cancellation arose, publisher THQ confirmed its cancellation for all platforms in May 2011, without citing any reasons. | Volition | THQ |
| Seaman | A version of Seaman was long-rumored to be in development for the 3DS. After the passing of Nintendo President Satoru Iwata, Seaman creator Yoot Saito, in his memorial comments for him, revealed that Iwata had asked him to create a Seaman title for the 3DS, and that Saito had started work on it, but undisclosed "complications" led to its cancellation. | Vivarium Inc. | Nintendo |
| Wonder Flick R | A cross-platform JRPG announced for iOS, Android, Nintendo 3DS, Xbox One, PlayStation 3, PlayStation 4, PlayStation Vita, and Wii U. The game was intended to support cross-saving, allowing the player to save progress on one platform and pick up where they left off on another. Gameplay also occurred on two separate screens, whether it be on dual screen platforms like Wii U and 3DS, or through other means like remote play. While the mobile versions released in early 2014 in Japan, it suffered from a troubled launch and short lifespan, being shut down just a year later, leading to the cancellation of all console versions. | Level-5 | Level-5 |
| WWE Brawl | A new WWE wrestling game, WWE Brawl, was announced in 2011 for release on PlayStation 3, Xbox 360, and Wii. Unlike THQ's annual WWE releases, Brawl was a spin-off intended to be a more fast paced party fighting game akin to Super Smash Bros. or Power Stone. However, the game was never released, presumably due to THQ's financial difficulties at the time. In 2024, a prototype of a previously-unknown Nintendo 3DS version was found and shared online. | THQ | THQ |
