= Yaiba: Ninja Gaiden Z =

2014 video game

- European box art
- Developer: Spark Unlimited (Note: Additional work by Team Ninja and Comcept.)
- Publisher: Koei Tecmo
- Directors: Toby Gard; Masahiro Yasuma
- Producers: John Garcia-Shelton; Shinsaku Ohara; Kohei Shibata
- Designer: Cory Davis
- Artists: Richard Smith; Shinsuke Komaki; Hirohisa Kaneko
- Writer: Bryan Keithley
- Composer: Grant Kirkhope
- Series: Ninja Gaiden
- Engine: Unreal Engine 3
- Platforms: PlayStation 3 Xbox 360; Microsoft Windows
- Release: PlayStation 3, Xbox 360: NA: March 18, 2014; EU: March 21, 2014; AU: March 25, 2014; JP: March 27, 2014; Windows; March 21, 2014
- Genres: Action-adventure, hack and slash
- Mode: Single-player

Yaiba: Ninja Gaiden Z is a 2014 action-adventure game and a spin-off of the Ninja Gaiden franchise. It was published by Tecmo Koei and developed by Spark Unlimited. Comcept's Keiji Inafune conceptualized the game, providing character designs and creating the character of Yaiba. The game was released for the PlayStation 3, Xbox 360, and Microsoft Windows worldwide in March 2014.

== Gameplay ==
Yaiba: Ninja Gaiden Z is a third-person hack and slash video game that features elements similar to previous titles in the series. Players can run, jump, block and attack enemies using Yaiba's blade. A score multiplier on the right-hand of the screen accumulates the player's hit-count on the enemy. The "Ultimate Technique" mode seen in other titles has been replaced by a mode called "Bloodlust" which, when activated, allows Yaiba to destroy multiple enemies around him in quick succession.

== Plot ==
The game follows the exploits of the powerful ninja Yaiba Kamikaze. Yaiba was once part of a clan that tested the abilities of its ninja by putting them up against a highly skilled member; in this case it was Yaiba they had to face. However, after growing weary of his work, Yaiba eventually decides to massacre his own clan and leave the survivors to their deaths. At one point he meets with the franchise mainstay Ryu Hayabusa and decides to challenge him, claiming that he is the weakest foe Yaiba has encountered thus far. During the battle he discovers otherwise as Ryu slices Yaiba's left arm and eye, killing him.

Later, Yaiba is discovered by a mysterious organization known as Forge Industries, led by Alrico del Gonzo, brings him back to life and restores his lost body parts with mechanized duplicates, thus turning him into a cyborg, with a female scientist named Miss Monday as his navigator. Yaiba learns that a zombie outbreak has begun and that Ryu has been searching for the source of the infection. He decides to work with the Forge Industries that resurrected him in order to exact his revenge against Ryu, agreeing to help put a stop to the spread of zombie infection.

Upon finally encountering Hayabusa again one last time, Yaiba finds out that Forge Industries has been manipulating every event, such as unleashing the zombie outbreaks and using him as a tool and self-destruct bomb to kill him and Hayabusa to further the organization's plan. Yaiba decides instead to sacrifice himself to destroy the bomb and spare Hayabusa's life in order for him to save his disciple, Momiji. Upon his revival by Miss Monday for the third time (as Hayabusa had killed him during their battle a second time), she too defects Forge Industries due to Del Gonzo's attitudes and manipulative nature, having unleashed the zombies for his own purposes of seeking immortality.

Once Yaiba landed in an abandoned, yet zombie infested Forge Industries building, Yaiba finds a portal to what appears to be an Aztec-themed alternate dimension and found the real Del Gonzo, who seems to be in a dying state inside a tube. Though unable to stop Del Gonzo from transforming into the embodiment of the Aztec god of the underworld, Yaiba manages to find a weak spot to make him mortal again. While Del Gonzo tries to escape from Yaiba's wrath, Miss Monday appears in person and kills Del Gonzo for good. With the portal to the real world closing, Yaiba and Miss Monday barely escape. In the end, Yaiba and Miss Monday decide sell the data of curing zombification. Unknown to them, Hayabusa is observing them.

== Development ==
Yaiba: Ninja Gaiden Z was unveiled on September 19, 2012. It was revealed that, along with Team Ninja, Keiji Inafune would be involved as the director of this new Ninja Gaiden title. On June 6, a new trailer appeared on GT.TV that featured a full motion video sequence, along with a short snippet of real-time gameplay. On October 8, it was announced that Ninja Gaiden Z would be released on Microsoft Windows through the Steam platform. This would make it the first time that a Ninja Gaiden title was released on the platform in the history of the franchise.

Canadian comic book artist James Stokoe created several art pieces for the game, displaying them at the New York Comic Con. The game is also complemented by a tie-in webcomic, published by Dark Horse Comics. It was drafted by writers Tim Seeley and Josh Eamons, and illustrated by Rafael Ortiz. The comic was released as a free download on Dark Horse's website on January 23, 2014. The first issue, part one of three, is available to download free on Dark Horse's site.

On December 13, 2013, it was announced that Beck from Mighty No. 9 would become a bonus playable character in Ninja Gaiden Z in the form of downloadable content. This was a deal struck between Comcept and Tecmo Koei, as Keiji Inafune is spearheading both titles.

== Reception ==
Reception

Aggregate score
Aggregator	Score		
Aggregator	PC	PS3	Xbox 360
Metacritic	49/100	43/100	50/100

Review scores
Publication	Score		
Publication	PC	PS3	Xbox 360
Destructoid	N/A	N/A	6/10
Eurogamer	N/A	2/10	N/A
Famitsu	N/A	36/40	36/40
Game Informer	6.5/10	6.5/10	6.5/10
GameRevolution	N/A	5/10	N/A
GameSpot	N/A	4/10	4/10
GameTrailers	N/A	5/10	N/A
IGN	N/A	5.6/10	5.6/10
Joystiq	N/A	3.5/5	N/A
PlayStation Official Magazine – UK	N/A	3/10	N/A
Official Xbox Magazine (US)	N/A	N/A	4/10
Polygon	3/10	N/A	N/A
Push Square	N/A	5/10	N/A
USgamer	N/A	N/A	1.5/5
The Escapist	N/A	0.5/5	N/A
Slant Magazine	N/A	2/5	N/A

The Xbox 360 version received "mixed" reviews, while the PC and PlayStation 3 versions received "generally unfavorable reviews", according to the review aggregation website Metacritic. Most of the criticism was focused on the repetitive gameplay, the difficulty and the level design. EGMNow gave the Xbox 360 version 5.5 out of 10, saying, "As a side project to the main series, Yaiba: Ninja Gaiden Z offers an interesting shift in tone and a main character with a lot of promise, but the combat and puzzles feel too rote and unpolished to deliver on the strong potential of the concept." GameZone gave the game 3.5 out of 10, saying, "For those that had hoped for a true Ninja Gaiden experience with Yaiba: Ninja Gaiden Z, you definitely got something with the challenge to match the old games. The problem is that this isn't the right kind of challenge. It isn't rewarding or fun, it's just annoying. For those that thought this would be a chance to play a Ninja Gaiden that wasn't too hard, stay a[s] far away as possible. Yaiba isn't worth losing a controller or your sanity over." Edge gave PlayStation 3 version a score of two out of ten, saying, "Basic combat is dismal, turgid stuff, yet accounts for almost all the action." In Japan, however, Famitsu gave the PS3 and Xbox 360 versions a score of all four nines each for a total of 36 out of 40.

Slant Magazine gave the PS3 version two stars out of five, calling it "A clueless game that has lost sight of what made its digital ancestors genre classics, cheapening itself by unwisely choosing style over substance." The Escapist gave it a half-star out of five, calling it "a dismal waste of a good idea. Painfully unfunny, graphically abhorrent, and straight-up disheveled in the combat department, this manages to be one of the worst games of the last generation, right at the very end of it." Metro gave it a score of one out of ten, saying that it was "Not just the worst game of the year but such a wretched failure of an action game that it's in the running for the worst of the generation."

It was ranked at #46 on the list of the 50 worst games of all time by GamesRadar+ in 2017.
