= Soul Sacrifice =

Soul Sacrifice may refer to:

- "Soul Sacrifice" (song), a 1969 instrumental by Santana
- Soul Sacrifice (video game), a 2013 video game
