= Kaio: King of Pirates =

- Developers: Comcept; Intercept
- Publisher: Marvelous
- Platform: Nintendo 3DS
- Genre: Action-adventure

Kaio: King of Pirates (海王, Kaiō) is a cancelled video game that was in development for the Nintendo 3DS handheld video game console. Announced in 2011, it featured over three years of development before being officially cancelled on March 13, 2015. The game was being developed by Keiji Inafune through his development studios Comcept and Intercept, and was to be published by Marvelous.

== Story ==
The game was to be a retelling of the Romance of the Three Kingdoms story. While the premise had been covered by other Japanese video game series, like Dynasty Warriors, the twist with Kaio was that it would be told through anthropomorphic animal pirate characters, analogous to how Dragon Ball retold the story of Journey to the West in a cartoonish style. The game was to star main character Sangokushi, a penguin, and was to feature over 300 animal characters. Inafune referred to the setting as "the adventurous great ocean where heroes fight for their ambition, justice, and their lives" and described the game's thematically as being about "human appeal... beyond the 'right and wrong' or the 'good and bad'? What is waiting in the end?"

== Development ==
Game development was led by Keiji Inafune, who was an artist and then later producer at Capcom before leaving in 2010. After leaving he then formed his own companies Comcept and Intercept. Kaio was one of the first titles the companies would work on. He chose the Nintendo 3DS platform over mobile phones due to his confidence in the relevance of handheld video game consoles. He opted to create a game that would be conducive to playing for hours on end, something he felt wasn't right for mobile phones. The game was once envisioned as the first part of a trilogy of titles and a multi-media franchise. The game had not technically ever outright been announced for English language release, though journalists noted it to be likely due to trailers featuring English subtitles.

The game was first announced in 2011, around the time of launch of the Nintendo 3DS handheld video game console, and was planned to be the company's first game. The game was originally slated for release in 2012, but was later delayed into 2014. By March 2015, publisher Marvelous announced it had been cancelled. They cited "a shifting marketplace" as the reason, leaving the company with less incentive to push forward on development. They also revealed that, over the course of its four-year development, over 461 million yen had been lost, approximately the equivalent of 3.8 million dollars.
