= Mega Man 7 =

1995 video game

- North American box art
- Developer: Capcom
- Publisher: Capcom
- Director: Yoshihisa Tsuda
- Producer: Tokuro Fujiwara
- Designers: Yoshihisa Tsuda; Ryo Miyazaki; Masahiko Kurokawa
- Programmers: Shinya Ikuta; Keiji Kubori; Kazuhiro Tsuchiya
- Artists: Keiji Inafune; Hayato Kaji; Toshifumi Onishi; Kazunori Tazaki; Tatsuya Yoshikawa
- Composers: Toshihiko Horiyama; Yuko Takehara; Makoto Tomozawa
- Series: Mega Man
- Platform: Super Nintendo Entertainment System
- Release: JP: March 24, 1995; NA: September 1995; EU: 1995
- Genre: Action
- Modes: Single-player, multiplayer

Mega Man 7 (Note: Stylized as Mega Man VII on the game's title screen.) (Note: Known in Japan as Rockman 7: Showdown of Destiny! (ロックマン7 宿命の対決!, Rokkuman Sebun: Shukumei no Taiketsu!)) is a 1995 action game developed and published by Capcom for the Super Nintendo Entertainment System (SNES). It is the seventh game in the original Mega Man series. The game was released in Japan on March 24, 1995 and was localized later in the year in North America and Europe.

Picking up 6 months after the events of Mega Man 6, the plot involves the protagonist Mega Man once again attempting to stop the evil Dr. Wily, who uses a new set of Robot Masters to free himself from captivity and begin wreaking havoc on the world. Along with some help from his old friends, Mega Man finds potential allies in the mysterious robot pair Bass and Treble, who are later revealed to be in league with Wily. In terms of gameplay, Mega Man 7 follows the same play style introduced in the 8-bit NES titles, but updates the graphics and sound of the series for the more powerful SNES.

According to its creators, Mega Man 7 was only in development for a short time before its release. Keiji Inafune handed off his duties to Hayato Kaji for this installment. Mega Man 7 has received mixed-to-positive reviews from critics. Although many considered it a competent game by itself, many other reviewers thought that the series' formula had gone stale, as they criticized the game for not innovating enough from its predecessors and negatively compared it to the more inventive Mega Man X, released on the SNES over a year earlier, because of it. A sequel, Mega Man 8, was released in 1996.

== Gameplay ==
Mega Man fires a charged blast at an enemy in the game's first level.

Gameplay in Mega Man 7 is similar to the six previous games in the series. The player, as Mega Man, must complete a series of side-scrolling platform levels that typically end in a boss battle with a Robot Master. Destroying the Robot Master earns the player its special Master Weapon, which can be selected and used in all future levels. Each Robot Master is weak to a specific Master Weapon. Unlike the first six Mega Man games, only four new Robot Master stages (Freeze Man, Junk Man, Burst Man and Cloud Man) are selectable at a time. After beating them, access to the other four Robot Masters (Spring Man, Slash Man, Shade Man and Turbo Man) are unlocked.

Mega Man 7 uses many of the same conventions introduced in previous installments, such as sliding along the ground, being able to charge the Mega Buster for more powerful shots, and calling on the hero's dog Rush to perform various tasks. One unique feature is Rush Search, which causes Rush to dig up useful items wherever the player is standing. Certain levels contain the letters "R-U-S-H", which, when collected, will grant the player access to the "Rush Super Adaptor", a combination of the two enhancements introduced in Mega Man 6 with a powerful rocket-arm attack and jetpack for flying short distances. Defeated enemies found throughout each level can give the player extra lives, items which refill health and weapon power, and special bolts. The player can visit "Eddie's Cybernetic Support Shop" from the level select screen, which is run by Dr. Light's new lab assistant, Auto, and where these bolts can be spent on items and power-ups, a feature that originally debuted in the Game Boy Mega Man titles. The use of bolts and the purchase of items at a part shop would become a standard for the core titles starting with Mega Man 7. Other gameplay elements also exist, such as the player being able to obtain the robotic helper bird Beat and Proto Man's trademark shield.

If the player enters a certain password (which is listed in the ending) and presses the L and R buttons after entering, a secret fighting game mode is available to play, though it must be played with another player (single-player is not available in this mode). In the mode, two players can control Mega Man or Bass in a fighting arena, where the goal is to defeat one another, similar to Capcom’s Street Fighter franchise. Mega Man and Bass can use various special moves, some of which are not in the base game.

== Plot ==
Taking place in the 21st century (the ambiguous year 20XX), Mega Man 7 begins directly 6 months after the events of Mega Man 6. Thanks to the efforts of Mega Man and his friends, Dr. Wily was finally brought to justice. However, Wily had always known that he might be imprisoned one day, and so he had constructed four advanced models of Robot Masters as backups in a hidden laboratory: Burst Man, Cloud Man, Junk Man, and Freeze Man. If they did not receive any communication for six months, they would activate and begin searching for their master. 6 months later, the robots activate, round up an army, and go on a rampage throughout the city in which Dr. Wily is being held. Mega Man is called into action. Upon driving into the city with Roll and Auto, he sees that it is in ruins, and that he is too late to stop Wily's Robot Masters from liberating the evil scientist. Mega Man gives chase, but is stopped by Bass, a robot with capabilities much like Mega Man's own, and his robotic wolf Treble. After a brief skirmish, Mega Man is informed that the two of them are battling Wily as well. Bass and Treble then take off, leaving Mega Man confused, but convinced that he has new allies and determined to again stop Dr. Wily's plans.

After Wily's Robot Masters are defeated, he dispatches four more to combat the protagonist: Spring Man, Slash Man, Shade Man, and Turbo Man. In one of the locations, Mega Man encounters an injured Bass and sends him to Dr. Light's lab for repairs. Mega Man defeats the remaining Robot Masters and goes back home, learning upon arriving that Bass had betrayed him, as he had gone berserk and had torn up the lab, escaping with parts for new enhancements that Dr. Light was working on. Wily appears on the video monitor and mocks reveals that Bass and Treble are actually his own creations, and that they only gained his trust in order to steal the parts, mocking him for falling for it. Bass' apparent ambition is to best Mega Man in combat and prove himself as the strongest robot in existence. Enraged, Mega Man makes his way to Wily's fortress and defeats Bass and Treble, and then Dr. Wily himself. As usual, Wily begs for mercy, but after giving him six chances to change his ways, Mega Man is fed up, and threatens him with his Mega Buster with the temptation to kill him. Terrified, Wily explains that as a robot, Mega Man is prevented from harming humans; Mega Man counters that he is "more than a robot" (In the Japanese version, Mega Man stops and stands in silence). Before Mega Man could do anything, he is interrupted when the fortress begins to self-destruct, and Bass and Treble arrive to rescue their creator at the last moment. Before escaping, Bass taunts Mega Man for his hesitation ("He who hesitates is lost"), vowing that he, Wily, and Treble will return to get their revenge. Mega Man then escapes the collapsing castle, contemplating the events that transpired, and returns home to his family.

== Development ==
Prior to the release of Mega Man 7, numbered entries in the original Mega Man series were only on the NES. Mega Man 7 is the first and only numbered title in the original series released on the SNES. Capcom had begun its Mega Man X spin-off series on the console more than a year before. Due to bad timing, the development team had to work under a very tight, three month schedule to complete Mega Man 7. The franchise's primary artist Keiji Inafune felt that due to the team's high motivation during that time, it was a very fun experience for him personally. The new head illustrator Hayato Kaji concurred, stated that the team was very devoted to the project's completion despite having to rush its development. Designer Yoshihisa Tsuda recounted, "I remember it being quite fun, like a sports team camp or something. Still, there are so many things about this title that I have regrets about, and even at the time we all found ourselves wishing for another month or so to work on it." Inafune took credit for designing the character Auto, who is based on stereotypical "tin man" robots he remembered seeing as a child. Inafune also did the initial rough sketches of Bass and Treble, which bear the names "Baroque" and "Crush" in his sketchbook. The ideas for these two characters were ultimately handed off to Kaji for design. As with many other games in the series, the eight Robot Masters featured in Mega Man 7 are the product of design contests held for fans by Capcom in Japan. Capcom received around 220,000 character submissions.

One of the development team's goals was to add locations where the Master Weapons can be used to interact with the environment. In addition, Inafune wanted to include a hidden boss battle mode and recommended the idea to Tsuda, who discussed the matter privately with the game's playtester. Just one week before the game went into its beta stage, the team decided to include this mode on the conditions that Mega Man and Bass be the only playable characters and that it would have no bugs. It was completed and included within two days. However, Capcom only made this mode accessible via a secret password. The team also intentionally made the game's final boss "insanely hard" and "something that cannot be defeated without the use of an Energy Tank [health restore]". Beta testing for the original Japanese and overseas versions of Mega Man 7 occurred simultaneously. The translated localizations of the game contain less dialogue than their Japanese equivalent. When Mega Man gains a new weapon in the North American version, he speaks with Dr. Light; in the Japanese version, Mega Man may exchange banter with Roll or Auto as well as Dr. Light.

In the summer of 1995 Capcom announced that an English translation was finished, but they had decided not to release it. According to Capcom, the resulting negative reaction from gamers was what prompted the game's eventual release. Gregory Ballard, the president of Capcom's North American division, admitted the company was too conservative in shipping copies of Mega Man 7 when it launched in the region in September. The demand for Capcom's released titles apparently did not meet the supply the previous year, causing the company to scale back during that particular release quarter.

The music and sound composition of Mega Man 7 was a collaboration of ten people, including Ippo Yamada, who was pulled in to work on the game while he was working on another project. A CD soundtrack for Mega Man 7 containing 37 pieces of music was published for the first time in Japan by Team Entertainment on November 21, 2007 amidst the franchise's 20th anniversary.

== Reception and legacy ==
Reception

Aggregate score
Aggregator	Score
GameRankings	70.77%

Review scores
Publication	Score
Electronic Gaming Monthly	7/10, 7/10, 7/10, 8.5/10
Famitsu	7/10, 6/10, 6/10, 5/10
Game Informer	7/10
GamePro	3.75/5
Next Generation	3/5
Super Play	79/100
VG&CE	7/10

Critically, Mega Man 7 has received a moderately positive reception in both past reviews and more contemporary retrospectives. A large amount of criticism arose from the game's alleged failure to bring anything new to an already aging series, with some considering it inferior to Mega Man X, which Capcom had released on the SNES more than a year prior. Tony Mott of Super Play found the game to lack improvement over its 8-bit counterparts in gameplay, stating that the level layouts are "muted and appear regular when compared to the X series". Brett Elston of GamesRadar similarly noted Mega Man 7 as feeling far too similar to the earlier games and that it pales in comparison to the SNES's more relevant and inventive Mega Man X. GamePro simply called it "a nice holdover" for fans waiting for the next game in the X series. Next Generation rated it three stars out of five, and stated that "it's still the same game", noting that the audience has grown and has gotten tired of it.

The game has enjoyed some positive remarks for its colorful presentation, play control, and challenge. GameSpot contributors Christian Nutt and Justin Speer praised it even compared to its predecessors: "Finally, a real upgrade to the original series on the SNES, after so many years on the moribund NES crippled the series. Unfortunately, it was a bit late to recover the massive popularity that the series had once enjoyed, but this was definitely a solid game." In a retrospective review of the game, IGN's Levi Buchanan found the game to be one of the weaker installments in the franchise despite its attempt to add new gimmicks, some of which simply fall flat. "It's still worth a play to see the 16-bit jump," Buchanan summarized. "But expectations should be appropriately curtailed."

Lucas M. Thomas of IGN described the introduction of Mega Man's rival Bass as the seventh installment's most important contribution to the franchise. In spite of Mega Man 7 technologically moving the series from its NES roots to the next generation of consoles, it would eventually transition back to an NES visual and audio style similar to the first six titles many years later. Mega Man 7 has been officially re-released five separate times since its 1995 debut: first on the Nintendo Power cartridge service in Japan, second on the Mega Man Anniversary Collection in North America for the PlayStation 2 and GameCube in 2004 and the Xbox in 2005, third for the Wii U Virtual Console in 2014, fourth for the New Nintendo 3DS Virtual Console in 2016, and fifth for Mega Man Legacy Collection 2 in 2017, with a Nintendo Switch version released in May 2018.
