= Afrika (video game) =

2008 video game

- North American box art
- Developer: Rhino Studios (Note: Additional work by Japan Studio.)
- Publishers: JP: Sony Computer Entertainment; NA: Natsume Inc.
- Director: Katsumoto Tatsukawa
- Producer: Katsumoto Tatsukawa
- Programmer: Takehiro Urabe
- Artist: Shintaro Ito
- Composer: Wataru Hokoyama
- Platform: PlayStation 3
- Release: JP: August 28, 2008; NA: October 6, 2009
- Genres: Life simulation Photography game
- Mode: Single-player

Afrika (Note: Japanese: アフリカ, Hepburn: Afurika) (known as Hakuna Matata in Hong Kong, South Korea, Taiwan and Southeast Asia) is a photography and safari simulation video game developed by Rhino Studios and published by Sony Computer Entertainment for the PlayStation 3. The game was first announced in a promotional video during the Sony press conference at E3 2006. Afrika has been referred to as being similar to the Nintendo 64 title Pokémon Snap. Natsume Inc. released the game in North America.

== Gameplay ==
In Afrika, the player assumes the role of a photojournalist hired to take images of various animals in Africa, as the name indicates. Gameplay is mission-driven; players receive emails at the base camp instructing them to which animals they must photograph. Players may then travel by foot, car, or hot air balloon to the areas where the requested animals are found in order to photograph them. The in-game camera is controlled by the Sixaxis. Depending on the quality of the photograph taken, the player will earn in-game money. The money can then be spent on new supplies, such as an upgraded camera. Real-life photos and footage of the animals can be unlocked. When unlocked, the content is stored in the "Animal Library".

The soundtrack for the game was composed, orchestrated, and conducted by Wataru Hokoyama.

== Development ==
Sony first showed a trailer for Afrika at E3 2006. This generated buzz, however, other than the title, little was actually known about the project.

In 2008, Sony put up an official website for the game. Soon after, a game description was posted on the Japanese retailer Gamestar's website with a trailer indicating the game was about a photojournalist.

The U.S. version of Afrika was announced at E3 2009, to be released on October 6, 2009. The North American release of the game is the only version that supports the trophy system.

== Reception ==
Reception

Aggregate scores
Aggregator	Score
GameRankings	58%
Metacritic	63/100

Review scores
Publication	Score
1Up.com	B−
Eurogamer	7/10
Famitsu	29/40
IGN	3.5/10

The game received mostly mixed reviews. Famitsu scored the game 29/40.

According to Media Create sales data, Afrika debuted in second place during its release week in Japan, selling 38,423 units.

The game's soundtrack was awarded "Best Original Video Game Score" by The Hollywood Music Awards 2008. Movie Music UK has the only review of the soundtrack and gave it 4.5/5.0, saying "Hokoyama has left a strong impression with the wonderful music he has composed. This is a soundtrack you cannot pass up".

== See also ==
- Aquanaut's Holiday: Hidden Memories
