= Wataru Hokoyama =

Japanese composer, conductor, and orchestrator

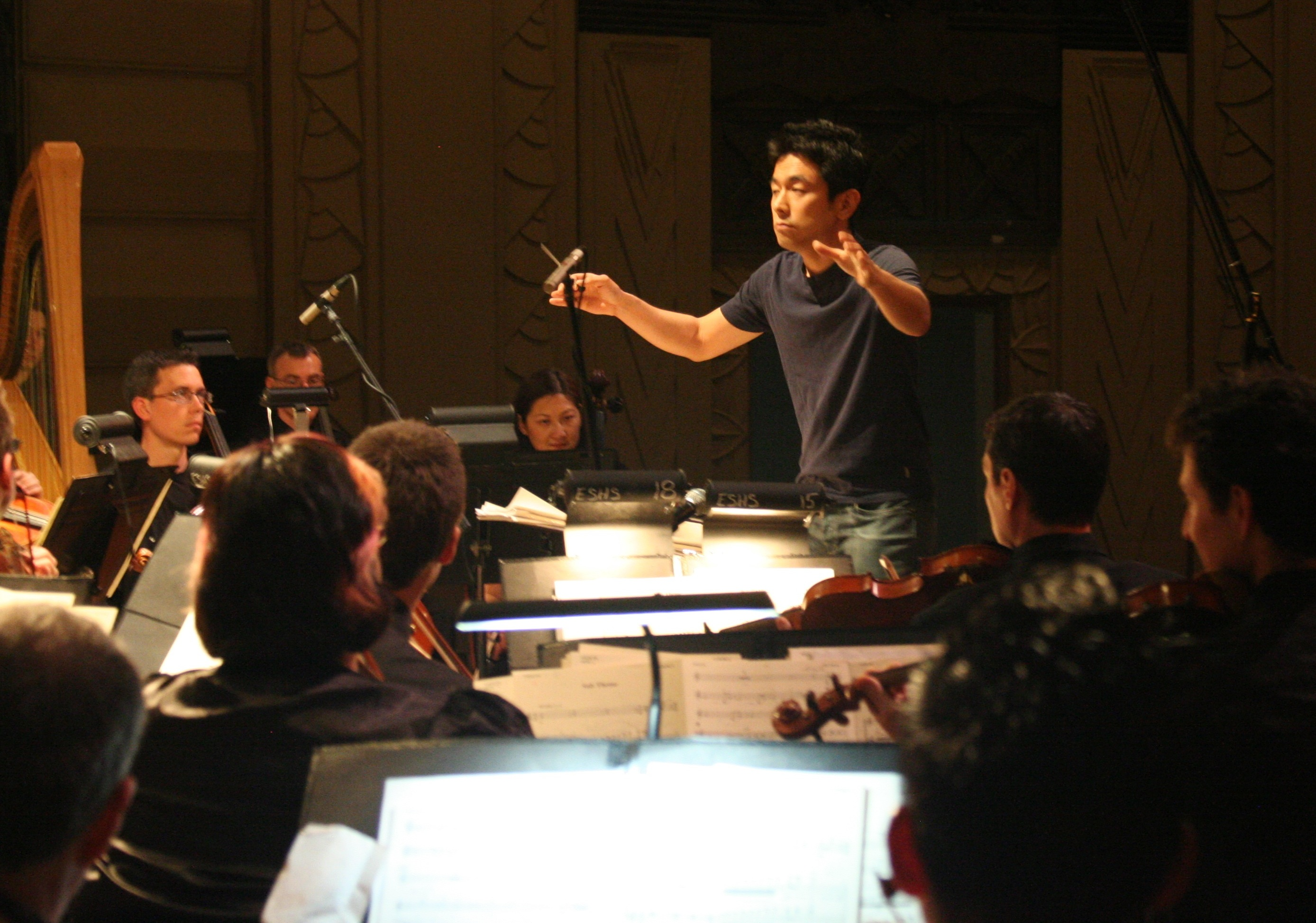
- Hokoyama conducting in 2009

Background information
- Born: August 24, 1974 (age 51); Aizu, Fukushima, Japan
- Occupations: Composer; conductor; orchestrator
- Years active: 2000–present

Wataru Hokoyama (鋒山 亘, Hokoyama Wataru; born August 24, 1974) is a Japanese composer, conductor, and orchestrator based in Hollywood, California. He left his birth nation of Japan at the age of 16 for arts school. He later attended the Cleveland Institute of Music and the USC Thornton School of Music. His works include the original scores for Bean Cake, Ocha Cups for Christmas, One, Afrika, and Soul Sacrifice.

In 2008, Hokoyama composed, orchestrated, and conducted all the music for the video game Afrika. The soundtrack was released in Japan. The music was awarded Best Original Video Game Score by The Hollywood Music Awards 2008. Movie Music UK has the only review of the soundtrack and gave it 4.5/5.0, saying "Hokoyama has left a strong impression with the wonderful music he has composed. This is a soundtrack you cannot pass up."

In 2009, Hokoyama provided a few orchestral cues for cutscenes in Resident Evil 5. Following that, Hokoyama then co-composed, orchestrated, and conducted the music for the 2013 PlayStation Vita game, Soul Sacrifice. He was assisted on the project by Yasunori Mitsuda. He would later rejoin Mitsuda to help compose new music for the sequel, Soul Sacrifice Delta. Also in 2013, he contributed some music and co-orchestrated the soundtrack to the PlayStation 4 game, Knack.

== Works ==
=== Television ===
- Buffy the Vampire Slayer (2002) - orchestration of the song "Mrs." in "Selfless"
- Miracle Planet (2005) - orchestration of an unknown episode

=== Films and TV ===
- Dungeons & Dragons (2000) - orchestration (with Paul S. Henning)
- Bean Cake (2001) - composition
- The Best Picture Show (2001) - composition
- One (2001) - composition
- Me and My Old Man (2001) - conducting
- Ocha Cups for Christmas (2002) - composition
- The Kabuki Joint (2003) - composition
- The Document of ‘God’s Left Hand, Devil’s Right Hand’ (2006) - composition
- Kami no hidarite akuma no migite (2006) - composition
- Chiyo (2006) - composition
- The Making of Dark Fantasy (2007) - composition
- 2095 (2007) - composition and orchestration (with Christopher Farrell)
- HOP (2011) - orchestration
- Gyo: Tokyo Fish Attack (2012) - composition and orchestration (with Go Shiina)
- Puppy! (2017) - music arranger
- Brad's Status (2017) - additional music (with Mark Mothersbaugh)
- The Lego Ninjago Movie (2017) - orchestral arrangements and additional music (with Mark Mothersbaugh)
- Thor: Ragnarok (2017) - additional music (with Mark Mothersbaugh)
- Pandas (2018) - additional music (with John Enroth, Albert Fox, Ethan Obbema, Mark Mothersbaugh and Ray Plaza)
- Hotel Transylvania 3: Summer Vacation (2018) - additional music (with Ray Plaza, Peter Seibert, and Mark Mothersbaugh)
- Holmes & Watson (2018) - additional music (with Mark Mothersbaugh, Ray Plaza, Tim Jones, Peter Seibert and Sunna Wehrmeijer)
- The Lego Movie 2: The Second Part (2019) - additional music (with Tim Jones, Peter Seibert, Ray Plaza, Mark Mothersbaugh and Alan Tyler)
- The Willoughbys (2020) - additional music and arrangements (with Mark Mothersbaugh, John Enroth, Albert Fox, Tim Jones and Pete Seibert)
- The Croods: A New Age (2020) - additional music (with Mark Mothersbaugh, Peter Seibert, Ethan Obbema and Brian Byrne)
- The Mitchells vs The Machines (2021) - score wrangler
- Monster Pets: A Hotel Transylvania (2021) - additional music (with Mark Mothersbaugh)
- Rugrats (2021 TV series) (2021) - additional music (with Robert Mothersbaugh)

=== Video games ===
- Afrika (2008) - composition, orchestration, and conducting
- Resident Evil 5 (2009) - composition, orchestration, and conducting
- Ace Combat: Joint Assault (2010) - orchestration and conducting
- Kinect Disneyland Adventures (2011) - composition and conducting (with Mark Griskey, Laura Karpman, Paul Lipson, Peter McConnell, and Lennie Moore)
- Ace Combat 3D: Cross Rumble (2012) - composition and orchestration (with many others)
- The Grinns Tale (2012) - composition
- Soul Sacrifice (2013) - composition, orchestration, and conducting (with Yasunori Mitsuda)
- Knack (2013) - composition and orchestration (with Matthew Margeson)
- Soul Sacrifice Delta (2014) - composition and orchestration (with Yasunori Mitsuda)
- Halo 2: Anniversary (2014) - orchestration (with Lennie Moore, Tom Salta, Brian Trifon, and Brian Lee White)
- Halo Wars 2 (2017) - conducting
- Volta-X (2020) - composer
- Ratchet & Clank: Rift Apart (2021) - composer (with Mark Mothersbaugh)
- Monster Hunter Rise (2021) - conductor (Los Angeles Recording Session)
- Ghost of Yotei (2025) - composer (accredited as Toma Otowa)

=== Other ===
- Music for NPR's All Things Considered.
- String arrangements on the Thirty Seconds to Mars album A Beautiful Lie.
- In 2007, he was commissioned by the United States Air Force Band to premiere a new piece for the 400th Anniversary of Jamestown's settlement and the 60th anniversary of US Air Force.
- Conducted Video Games Live with the New Jersey Symphony Orchestra in Newark, NJ on December 29–30, 2010, with the National Philharmonic Orchestra & Chorale in Bethesda, MD on February 26, 2011, and with the Mesa Symphony Orchestra and Vocal Exchange Choir in Mesa, AZ on April 7, 2011.
- Composed the piece Animas Luminis, written as a memorial and requiem to the 2011 Tōhoku earthquake and tsunami victims.
