= Bugs vs. Tanks! =

2013 video game

- Developer: Natsume Atari
- Publisher: Level-5
- Designer: Keiji Inafune
- Series: Guild
- Platform: Nintendo 3DS (3DS eShop)
- Release: JP: March 19, 2013; WW: June 20, 2013
- Genre: Shooter
- Mode: Single-player

Bugs vs. Tanks! (虫けら戦車, Mushikera Sensha) is a tank action game designed by Keiji Inafune. The game sees players take the role of various World War II tanks piloted by Nazi soldiers that have been shrunk down to miniature size in order to fight against various bugs and insects. It is part of the Guild02 series, released for the 3DS eShop in 2013.

== Reception ==
Reception

Aggregate score
Aggregator	Score
Metacritic	50/100

Review scores
Publication	Score
Destructoid	7.5/10
Edge	3/10
GamesMaster	60%
Hardcore Gamer	2/5
Nintendo Life	5/10
Nintendo World Report	8/10
Official Nintendo Magazine	60%

The game received "mixed" reviews according to the review aggregation website Metacritic.
