= Sweet Fuse: At Your Side =

2012 video game

Sweet Fuse : At Your Side
- North American cover art
- Developer: Comcept
- Publishers: JP: Idea Factory; WW: Aksys Games
- Platform: PlayStation Portable
- Release: JP: June 14, 2012; NA: August 27, 2013; PAL: August 28, 2013
- Genre: Visual novel
- Mode: Single-player

Sweet Fuse: At Your Side, released in Japan as Bomb Decision (バクダン★ハンダン, Bakudan Handan), is an otome visual novel for the PlayStation Portable. The game can also be played on the PlayStation Vita by being downloaded from the PlayStation Store. It was released in the PAL region and North America in August 2013 by Aksys Games.

== Gameplay ==
Sweet Fuse is a mystery and romance visual novel in which the player assumes the role of Saki Inafune, as she plays through seven days of death games. Much of its gameplay is spent on reading the story's narrative and dialogue. The player will be prompted on occasion to pick what to make Saki say. Picking the correct responses will sometimes give the player an "affection point" for a particular character which raises that character's affection level. There are moments during which Saki will become irate, indicated by the screen shaking and turning red, and the player will have to choose between having her restrain her anger or letting it out.

"Explosive Insight" sections take place when Saki must find a solution or an answer to a problem. Saki recalls the situation to herself, with a number of keywords and phrases in her thoughts highlighted. The player can pick up to three highlighted words or phrases to select, and the player prompts Saki's epiphany if one of their selections is correct. If the player does not select the correct phrases, a bad ending will usually occur and they are prompted to try again.

The game follows a branching plot line with multiple endings; depending on the decisions that the player makes during the game, the plot will progress in a specific direction.

== Characters ==
Saki Inafune (稲船 沙希, Inafune Saki)
Voiced by: Maki Kobayashi
The protagonist, who is a high-school girl and niece to Keiji Inafune. Her first and last name can be changed by the player. She has excellent intuition, making her great at spotting lies.

Subaru Shidou (士道 昴流, Shidou Subaru)
Voiced by: Kenichi Suzumura
A police inspector who was in charge of security for the opening ceremony. He is calm, collected, and rational, although slightly uptight.

Towa Wakasa (若狭 永遠, Wakasa Towa)
Voiced by: Yūki Kaji
A member of the famous pop group, Junior Jr. Boys. He is cheerful and energetic on stage, but when things go wrong he is easily scared.

Kouta Meoshi (芽御師 航太, Meoshi Kouta)
Voiced by: Masakazu Morita
A gloomy, asocial shut-in obsessed with video games. He is an online legend nicknamed "Ares" by fellow gaming fans for his gaming prowess.

Ayumu Shirabe (調辺 歩, Shirabe Ayumu)
Voiced by: Ken Narita
A freelance journalist who always looks like he needs a good night's sleep. He is obsessed with the truth, and will do anything to get to it.

Kimimaru Urabe (卜部 君麻呂, Urabe Kimimaro)
Voiced by: Junichi Suwabe
A young fortune teller known as the "Oracle of Shinjuku". He has a calming and gentle disposition.

Ryuusei Mitarashi (御手洗 流星, Mitarashi Ryuusei)
Voiced by: Satoshi Hino
An escort at a club called "Ulysses" in Ginza. Has a short fuse and is quick with his fists, but maintains a professional demeanor.

Makoto Mikami (魅神 真, Mikami Makoto)
Voiced by: Chihiro Suzuki
An upbeat, friendly college student who was attacked by piglets right before the opening ceremony.

Keiji Inafune (稲船 敬二, Inafune Keiji)
Voiced by: Norio Kobayashi
The heroine's uncle, who is also well-known as a legendary video game designer. During the game, he is held hostage somewhere in the park.

Count Hogstein (ワルドブー, Warudobū)
Voiced by: Tanoshingo
A mysterious person in a pig-suit who has taken over the park by taking the management hostage.

== Reception ==
Reception

Review scores
Publication	Score
GameZone	7.5/10
Hardcore Gamer	4/5
USgamer	4/5

== In other media ==
Serialization of a shōjo manga by Kyōnosuke Yamaguchi began in 2012 in Kadokawa Shoten's magazines Altima A, then Monthly Asuka. It was released as a tankōbon on February 21, 2013, under the imprint Asuka Comics DX.
