= Retro Mystery Club Vol.1: The Ise-Shima Case =

2019 video game

- Nintendo Switch promo art
- Developer: Happy Meal
- Publishers: JP: Flyhigh Works; WW: Shinyuden
- Producer: Junji Seki
- Series: Retro Mystery Club
- Platforms: Nintendo Switch, PlayStation 4, Windows
- Release: Nintendo Switch: JP: January 24, 2019; WW: September 14, 2023; PlayStation 4: JP: June 20, 2019; Windows: JP: July 23, 2019; WW: August 24, 2023
- Genre: Adventure
- Mode: Single-player

Retro Mystery Club Vol.1: The Ise-Shima Case (Note: Japanese: 伊勢志摩ミステリー案内 偽りの黒真珠, Hepburn: Ise Shima Misuterī Annai Itsuwari No Kuro Shinju; lit. 'Ise-Shima Mystery Guide: The False Black Pearl') is a 2019 adventure game. It is a mystery-themed game set in modern-day Tokyo where the player takes the role of a detective along with their partner Ken. After the discovery of the death of a homeless man, various clues are left behind, leaving to an incident that involves black pearls.

The game began development in 2010 when the game's producer Junji Seki met with manga artist Arai Kiyokazu to collaborate on developing an adventure game. While initially planning a game for feature phones, they found the market for such products failing and put the project on hold for a few years. Seki went independent in 2012 and founded the company Happy Meal, in which he was the only employee. The producer said the project got back into development around 2017 originally for the Nintendo 3DS before moving the project to the Nintendo Switch at the behest of the publisher. The game is purposely done in a retro-style of Family Computer, or Famicom adventure games, in terms of graphics and gameplay.

It was released in Japan on January 24, 2019. It received a positive review from the four critics in Famitsu. A crowdfunding campaign was made for the sequel, which reached its goal in two days, leading to the sequel Retro Mystery Club Vol.2: The Beppu Case (2022).

== Plot ==
The game is set in modern-day Tokyo. After the discovery of the death of a homeless man in Ueno, Tokyo, various clues are left behind, leaving the detective and his assistant Ken to Ise-Shima, where an incident involving black pearls unfolds.

== Gameplay ==
Gameplay of talking with Ken in The Ise-Shima Case. The game features a menu select to interact with the scene on the left.

Retro Mystery Club Vol.1: The Ise-Shima Case is an adventure game where the player selects commands such as "Talk", "Investigate", and "Show" and gives instructions to Ken. Other commands can be done, such as using a smartphone to take photos of evidence and search for information on the internet. The smartphone can also be used to play a vertically scrolling action mini-game. There game is linear, and there are no game-over scenarios in the game.

The setting is still modern-day, and smartphone commands can be used to take photos of evidence and search for information on the internet. These commands will likely prove useful in solving the case. We also confirmed that smartphone commands can be used to play a mini-game, a vertically scrolling action game where players aim for a high score.

== Development ==
=== Early 2010s staging ===
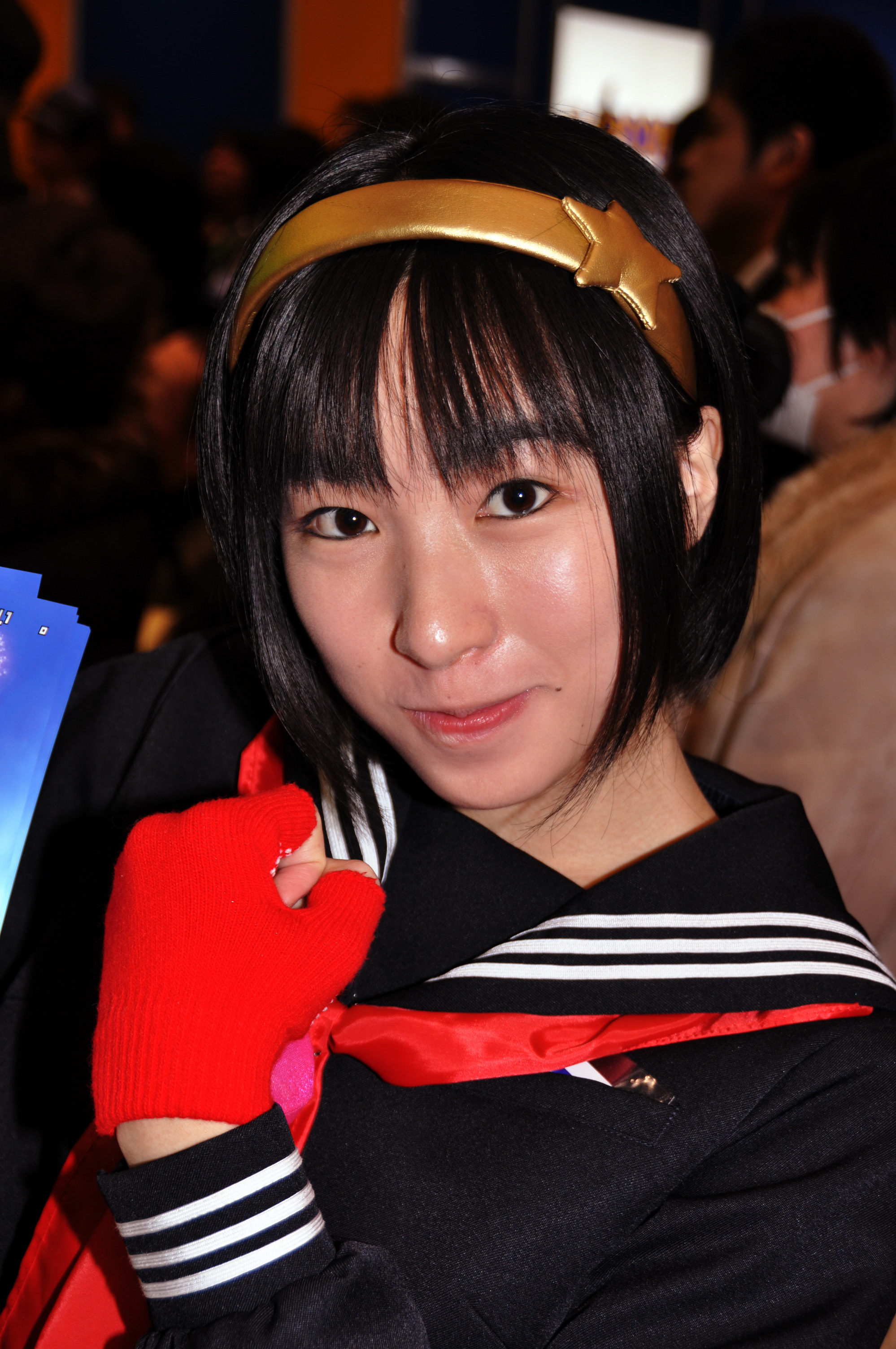
Idol Haruna Anno in 2009. She was initially involved on with Seki and Kiyokazu on an early game project which later became The Ise-Shima Case.

Retro Mystery Club Vol.1: The Ise-Shima Case's producer was Junji Seki. Seki entered the video game business in 1994, working for ADK Corporation for two years. Planning for The Ise-Shima Case began in 2010, when Seki was approached by an illustrator and manga artist Arai Kiyokazu who wanted to make an adventure game with him. Kiyokazu is known for serializing their comic Basikkun that appeared in Login and for over 10 years in Famicom Tsūshin (now Famitsu) as well as the caricatures of reviewers in the same magazine.

At the time, Seki was working at Cave, making games that were distributed on feature phones. After which, he developed his own company called OneUpGames, where he created software that made games in the style of the Famicom for feature phones. One game was to involve idol Haruna Anno and have art by Kiyokazu which was showcased at the Tokyo Game Show in September 2011. It was originally going to titled Higo Renkan Satsujin Meikyū No Burōdowei (Note: 肥後連環殺人 迷宮のブロードウェイ; lit. Higo Serial Murders: Broadway in the Labyrinth). This game was initially set to be about a murder that took place at Nakano Broadway. Development was halted after a trial version of the game for the Android OS was released. Seki explained that it took time to develop as the market for these mobile games with one-time or monthly pay formats vanished when smartphones appeared with their free-to-play format. This put the project on hold for about four years. Seki said that on displaying his games at the Tokyo Game Show, he expected children would find it too old-fashioned, but when he saw their positive response, it gave him confidence in presuming a new game with pixel art.

=== Production ===
Seki went independent in 2012 and founded the company Happy Meal, in which he was the only employee. Seki said that Kiyokazu regretted not being able to complete their original collaboration, which led to Seki approaching Nintendo about a Nintendo 3DS version of the game. He said that talking to Nintendo for the project made him nervous, but found that the company had a proactive stance to develop digital download titles for the system, which he presumed played a big role in them accepting the project idea. He said that restarting the project in earnest only began in 2017. During the production, Seki said his team members had other high-priority projects, which led to the game being developed in their spare time. Huang Zhengkai, the president of Flyhigh Works approached Seki in 2018, asking about the status of the game and suggested that they move the project to the Nintendo Switch and would support them as their publisher.

By September 2017, the game's scenario and programming were complete, with the only final script to be completed. The rough outline of the plot was created by Seki, and put more into form by Yasuyuki Omi. Seki had locals supervise the dialect in the game, and asked to avoid translating it into standard Japanese to retain the flavor of dialects that aren't used much anymore. He said that the aim was to create a traditional adventure games command-based adventure, as well as a sound novel. This was done for a more modern audience, who would be more familiar with the latter's style and tried to find a balance between both for pacing of the game. He recalled Derby Stallion creator Hiroyuki Sonobe purposely had non-playing characters (NPCs) in his games whose text-speed reflecting of their personality, such as an older woman having animated text enter the screen slower. He adapted this for this game. He experimented with the idea of each character having their own sound effects for when talking, but opted against this as he felt it was against the Famicom aesthetic.

Seki went to various locations to research locations for three days and mark the distance between the locations in the game as being within a reasonable distance from each other. For the art, Seki said they did not have to give him major direction, but said to prioritize what Kiyokazu had in mind based on the character and settings. He said that they did have frequent meetings to solidify the image of the game together. When asked if there would be any erotic scenes in the game, Seki said there was some sex appeal, but as it was being made for the Switch, it was kept to a minimum. Seki also said he felt he made the game too much and cut it shorter than he had originally planned.

== Release and sequels ==
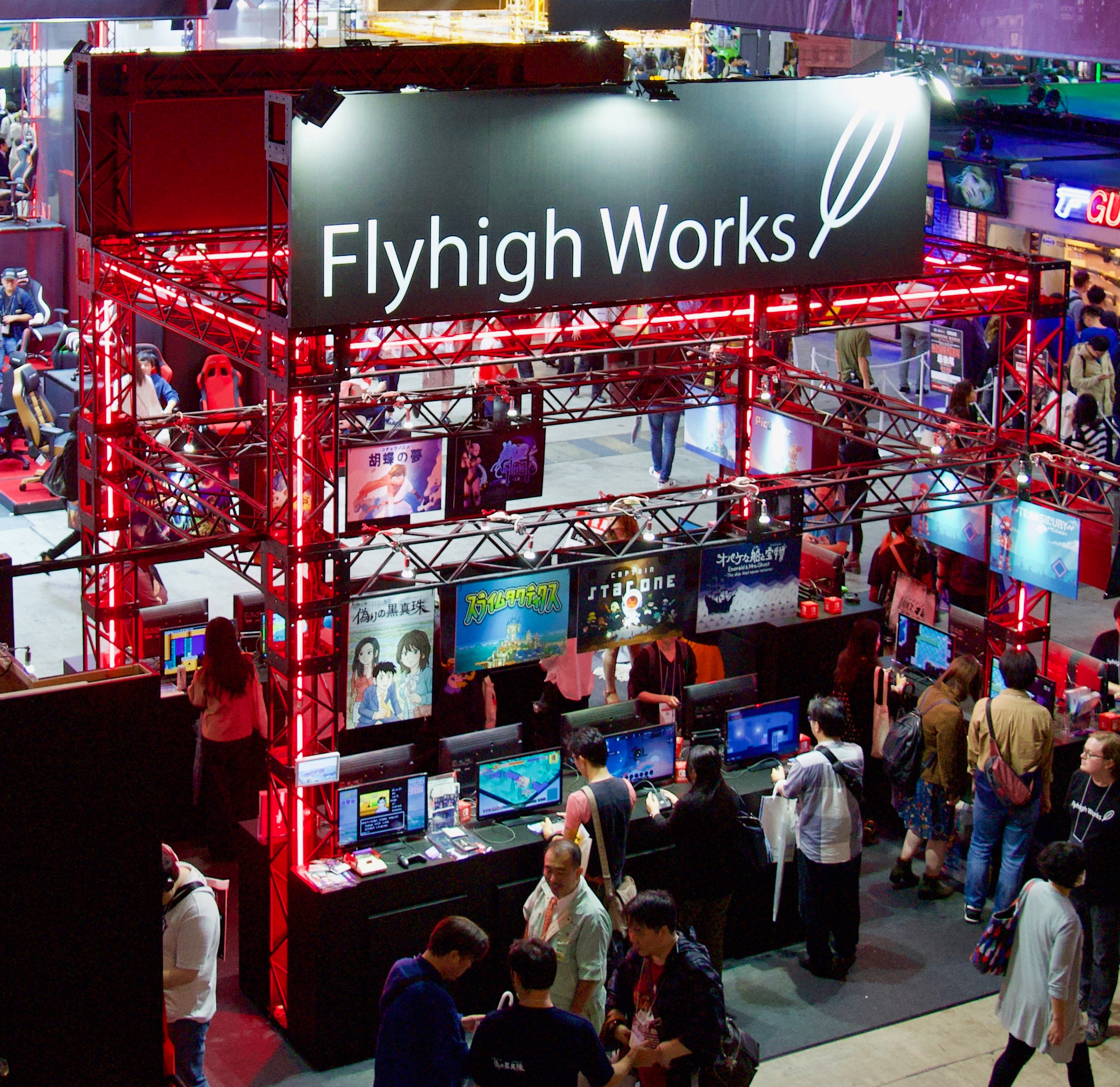
Flyhigh Works's booth at the 2018 Tokyo Game Show with The Ise-Shima Case on display.

The Nintendo 3DS version Retro Mystery Club Vol.1: The Ise-Shima Case was showcased at the Tokyo Game Show in 2017. It was playable at the Flyhigh Works booth at the Tokyo Game Show in 2018. The game was published by Flyhigh Works in Japan. It was first released on January 24 for the Nintendo Switch, followed by June 20 for the PlayStation 4 and through Steam for Windows on July 23, 2019. The Nintendo eShop, the original distribution point for the 3DS version, closed in Japan on March 28, 2023.

The Nintendo Switch version of the game received downloadable content (DLC) on July 4, which included a sound test mode to listen to the music in the game, and a karaoke mode, featuring songs from the game in a karaoke format. The soundtrack of the game was also released on compact disc on the same day. The game was published in English by the Tokyo-based publisher Shinyuden on August 24 for Windows and on September 14, 2023, for the Switch.

Seki said that a sequel was planned for two reasons: the first was a response to the positive reception on the games announcement and release. The second was that at selling the game for 1,000 Japanese yen, led to the difficulties in the breaking even on it. To solve this, they went towards a crowdfunding campaign to gauge how strong a demand for a sequel was. The campaign for a sequel began on June 7, 2019, through Campfire, a Japanese crowdfunding website. It reached their target amount of 3 million Japanese yen in two days and achieved their stretch goal of 5 million yen by July 4. A sequel, titled Retro Mystery Club Vol.2: The Beppu Case (Note: 秋田・男鹿ミステリー案内 凍える銀鈴花, Akita Oga Misuterī Annai Kogoeru Ggin Suzuhana; lit. 'Akita Oga Mystery Guide: The Frozen Silver Bell Flower') was released on December 24, 2020. It was released in English for the Nintendo Switch and Windows in 2024 by Shinyuden.

== Reception ==
Reception

Review score
Publication	Score
Famitsu	8/10, 8/10, 7/10, 8/10

Among the four reviewers in the Japanese magazine Famitsu, one commented on its retro aesthetic in terms of gameplay, music, and graphics. One reviewer complimented Kiyokazu's character design and pixel art, saying it was rare to enjoy a game that's much in the same style as Hokkaido Rensa Satsujin: Ohotsuku ni Kiyu. Another said that as an older gamer, it had just the right amount of retro atmosphere to reaffirm the quality of the source material. A reviewer in Dengeki Online said the game established a compelling story and felt modern. Other Famitsu reviewers said that the commitment to older gameplay aesthetics may frustrate some players. While one said the game had enough hints and challenges that it gave you a sense of accomplishment when solving a problem, it could add some more contemporary conveniences, like a backlog of text.

Seki said that he was initially worried about how fans of older adventure games would find The Ise-Shima Case, but was glad to find that their reactions were similar to his own. He added that despite trying to consciously lower the difficulty of the game, he found still found comments from players finding the game too difficult.

Writing for IGN, video game critic Koji Fukuyama included the game in his top ten of 2019. He wrote that the secret to the game's success was Kiyokazu's pixel art and Seki's dedication to the form through its low price-point and lack of cost-cutting features such as re-using backgrounds and characters even for the most brief scenes. He said that it shows that the classic style of adventure game remained far from obsolete.

== See also ==
- Adventure game#History of Japanese adventure games
- Japanese detective fiction
