= Level-5 Osaka Office =

Japanese video game developer

- Native name: 株式会社レベルファイブ 大阪オフィス
- Romanized name: Kabushiki gaisha reberufaibu Ōsaka ofisu
- Type: Division
- Industry: Video games
- Predecessor: Level-5 Comcept
- Founded: December 1, 2010 (Comcept, Inc.); March 3, 2025 (Level-5 Osaka Office)
- Founder: Keiji Inafune
- Defunct: April 30, 2025 (Level-5 Comcept)
- Fate: Merged (Level-5 Comcept)
- Headquarters: Umeda, Kita-ku, Osaka, Japan
- Products: Mighty No. 9; ReCore
- Number of employees: 15 (as of June 2017)
- Parent: Level-5
- Website: www.level5.co.jp/level5comcept/

Level-5 Osaka Office is a Japanese video game developer and division of Level-5 based in Osaka. It is the successor to Level-5 Comcept, originally founded as Comcept, Inc. by former Capcom designer Keiji Inafune on December 1, 2010 as an independent company. As Comcept, their works included Soul Sacrifice, Mighty No. 9, ReCore and Red Ash: The Indelible Legend. In addition to games on handheld and home consoles, Comcept (and Level-5 Comcept) also developed multiple mobile games. The company was acquired by Level-5 in 2017 and became a subsidiary.

Inafune left Level-5 in 2024. Several months later, on March 3, 2025, the company created the Osaka Office in the Level-5 Comcept office. Level-5 Comcept was officially dissolved by a shareholders' resolution on January 13, 2026. Its assets will be transferred to Level 5 and Comcept will be shuttered.

== History ==
=== Founding ===
Logo as Comcept

Keiji Inafune founded Comcept after his departure from Capcom in December 2010. After the cancellation of Mega Man Legends 3, which he mentioned as a "long-time held dream", he thought that "not only had he abandoned himself, but the fans too".

Comcept functioned as a design and production studio which paired up with other studios to develop games. This often included working on multiple games at once, and doing a variety of genres instead of being narrowly focused.

Comcept's first game was the free to play smartphone title The Island of Dr. Momo. The game had micro-transactions, and was released through the GREE platform. They also developed another mobile game, J.J. Rockets.

=== Yaiba: Ninja Gaiden Z ===
In September 2012, the team's next project was revealed as a new Ninja Gaiden title, named Yaiba: Ninja Gaiden Z. The game is a collaboration between Comcept, Team Ninja, and American developer Spark Unlimited. When announcing the game, Inafune said: "I'm very happy to stand here next to Mr. [Yosuke] Hayashi today, and we'll prove to you that we are going to survive and make good games that will lead the Japanese game industry."

The game was released in March 2014 to a largely negative reception, with Metacritic giving it a score of 43. GamesRadar included it in their list of "the 50 worst games of all time".

=== Kaio: King of Pirates ===
In 2012, Comcept and Intercept (a game developer also founded by Inafune) began work on Kaio: King of Pirates (海王, Kaiō), which was to be published by Marvelous. It was set for release on the Nintendo 3DS. Using a pirate setting, the plot was a retelling of the Chinese story Romance of the Three Kingdoms. Marvelous cancelled the game in 2015, and reported a loss of ¥461 million (roughly $3.8 million USD) on the project.

=== Soul Sacrifice ===
In 2013, Comcept assisted Sony Computer Entertainment and its Japan Studio in designing the PlayStation Vita game Soul Sacrifice and the expansion, Soul Sacrifice Delta.

=== Mighty No. 9 ===
At PAX Prime 2013, Inafune held a special panel in order to reveal a brand new project called Mighty No. 9, a spiritual successor to the Mega Man series. At the end of the panel, Inafune officially launched the game's Kickstarter campaign. He thought that Kickstarter would be "a great way to make dreams a reality". The game was developed jointly with Inti Creates (another studio founded by Capcom staff). After several delays, the game was released in 2016. It was met with a mixed critical reception for its level of quality and gameplay.

Following the release of the game, Inafune stated: "You know, I want to word this in a way to explain some of the issues that come with trying to make a game of this size on multiple platforms." adding "I'm kind of loath to say this because it's going to sound like an excuse and I don't want to make any excuses. I own all the problems that came with this game and if you want to hurl insults at me, it's totally my fault. I'm the key creator. I will own that responsibility." His translator, Ben Judd, followed up these remarks by giving his assessment of the project: "In this case, it was do the base game and do all the ports all at the same time. And it ended up being a huge amount of work, more than they actually estimated. Definitely, when they looked at the project, they were wrong about a lot of things. They underestimated how much work, time and money was going to be necessary. All of those things create a huge amount of pressure." Later Judd added “But, again, we can hope that if things go well, there'll be sequels. Because I'll tell you what, I'm not getting my 2D side-scrolling fill. And at the end of the day, even if it's not perfect, it's better than nothing. At least, that's my opinion.”

In 2017, Comcept licensed the Mighty No. 9 characters to Inti Creates, allowing them to feature the characters however they wished, free of charge, in their Nintendo Switch game Mighty Gunvolt Burst.

=== Red Ash ===
The logo of Red Ash: The Indelible Legend

Red Ash: The Indelible Legend (Note: Known in Japanese as Red Ash: The Witch of Mech-Armor Castle CalCannon (RED ASH機鎧城カルカノンの魔女, Reddo Asshu Kiganjō KaruKanon no Majo)) was announced as a spiritual successor to the Mega Man Legends series. Also funded via Kickstarter, the campaign ended with $519,999, well short of its $800,000 goal. It was later announced on July 30, 2015 that Chinese publisher Fuze would finance the game.

The campaign for Red Ash was heavily criticized by game journalists and fans alike, describing it as rushed and poorly planned.

A CGI short titled Red Ash: -Gearworld-, originally known as Red Ash: -Magicicada-, was funded by a separate Kickstarter campaign handled by Studio 4°C, that was released to coincide with the game. The short was released in March 2017 as part of the Young Animator Training Project's Anime Mirai 2017 project.

Red Ash was ultimately never released before Comcept's closure; its status is unknown.

=== Level-5 era ===
Logo as Level-5 Comcept

In 2017, Comcept was acquired by Level-5 and became Level-5 Comcept. The Tokyo office was closed, leaving the Osaka location as the sole base of operations. Their first game under Level-5 was the mobile game Dragon & Colonies, launched in June 2019. The game was shut down on February 17, 2020. It later provided development assistance for various later Level-5 games, such as Yo-kai Watch Jam: Yo-kai Academy Y – Waiwai Gakuen Seikatsu and Megaton Musashi. On February 8, 2023, it was revealed Level-5 Comcept would handle the development of Fantasy Life i: The Girl Who Steals Time.

On March 3, 2025, Level-5 revealed on a blog post that Keiji Inafune had left the company in mid-2024, and Fantasy Life i would be undergoing a major overhaul to development following unfavorable feedback from playtesters. In the same post, the company also announced the creation of the new Osaka Office, based in Level-5 Comcept's offices, in order to take over the game's development.

Level-5 Comcept was officially disbanded on April 30, 2025 and merged into Level-5 Osaka Office, following a shareholders meeting that day. The news was publicly revealed on May 15. At a shareholder meeting, Keiji Inafune announced a resolution to formally end Comcept on January 13, 2026. Comcept was a separate legal entity than Level-5 Comcept.

== Games developed ==
Year	Title	Co-developer	Platform(s)	Note(s)	Ref.
2011	The Island of Dr. Momo		Android, iOS	Published via GREE	
2011	JJ Rockets	Marvelous AQL	Android, iOS		
2012	Sweet Fuse: At Your Side	Idea Factory	PlayStation Portable		
2013	Soul Sacrifice	Marvelous AQL, Japan Studio	PlayStation Vita		
2013	Guild02 – Bugs vs. Tanks!	Level-5	Nintendo 3DS		
2014	Yaiba: Ninja Gaiden Z	Team Ninja, Spark Unlimited	Windows, PlayStation 3, Xbox 360		
2014	Soul Sacrifice Delta	Marvelous AQL, Japan Studio	PlayStation Vita		
2016	Mighty No. 9	Inti Creates	Windows, OS X, Linux, PlayStation 3, PlayStation 4, PlayStation Vita, Wii U, Nintendo 3DS, Xbox 360, Xbox One	Kickstarter; Vita and 3DS versions never completed	
2016	ReCore	Armature Studio	Windows, Xbox One		
2018	Fantasy Life Online	Level-5	Mobile phones		
2019	Dragons & Colonies		Mobile phones	Launched in June 2019, temporarily taken offline from August to October and relaunched, shut down completely in February 2020	
2020	Yo-kai Watch Jam: Yo-kai Academy Y	Level-5	Nintendo Switch, PlayStation 4		
2021	Megaton Musashi	Level-5	Nintendo Switch, PlayStation 4		
2025	Fantasy Life i: The Girl Who Steals Time		Nintendo Switch, Nintendo Switch 2, PlayStation 4, PlayStation 5, Xbox Series X/S, Windows		
2025	Inazuma Eleven: Victory Road	Level-5 And Animation By Mappa	Nintendo Switch, Nintendo Switch 2, PlayStation 4, PlayStation 5, Xbox Series X/S, Windows		
