= Mighty No. 9 =

2016 video game

- Developers: Comcept; Inti Creates
- Publisher: Deep Silver: JP: Spike Chunsoft
- Directors: Koji Imaeda; Kinshi Ikegami
- Producers: Nick Yu; Takuya Aizu; Yukimasa Tamura
- Designers: Yoichi Ono; Tobuto Dezaki
- Artists: Shinsuke Komaki; Yuji Natsume
- Writer: Keiji Inafune
- Composers: Manami Matsumae; Ippo Yamada
- Engine: Unreal Engine 3
- Platforms: PlayStation 3; PlayStation 4; Wii U; Windows; Xbox 360; Xbox One; OS X; Linux
- Release: PS3, PS4, Wii U, Windows, Xbox 360, Xbox One: JP/NA: June 21, 2016; PAL: June 24, 2016; OS X, Linux: WW: August 25, 2016
- Genres: Action, platform
- Modes: Single-player, multiplayer

Mighty No. 9 is a 2016 action platform video game developed by Comcept, in conjunction with Inti Creates, and published by Deep Silver. The game was crowdfunded through Kickstarter and incorporated heavy input from the public. Mighty No. 9 closely resembles the early Mega Man series in both gameplay and character design, on which project lead Keiji Inafune worked, and is considered a spiritual successor.

The minimum Kickstarter goal for Mighty No. 9 was successfully funded after two days of the launch of the campaign in September 2013. However, several other features including additional stages, special modes and ports to other platforms were announced after additional "stretch goals" related to it were achieved, increasing the total funds obtained to over 400% of the original goal. The game was originally scheduled to be released in April 2015, but was delayed multiple times until it was eventually released for PlayStation 3, PlayStation 4, Wii U, Windows, Xbox 360, and Xbox One in June 2016, with Linux and OS X ports released in August 2016, with planned versions for the PlayStation Vita and Nintendo 3DS never surfacing.

Mighty No. 9 was highly anticipated after it was announced, but lengthy delays and Comcept's decision to fund another project, Red Ash: The Indelible Legend, through Kickstarter were met with accusations of mismanagement. The game received mixed to negative reviews from critics upon launch, with criticism being directed towards the game's design, graphics, lack of content, voice acting, story, and technical performance on home console platforms.

== Gameplay ==
Mighty No. 9 is focused on 2D platforming with a blend of 2D and 3D artwork and animation. Players control a robot named Beck (Mighty No. 9), who is able to run, jump, and shoot projectiles at enemies he encounters. Furthermore, the player is able to acquire both weapons and abilities from enemies they defeat. The game features an intro level followed by the eight main levels, which are freely chosen in any order by the player. At the end of each stage, Beck must face one of the other eight "Mighty" units in a boss battle. A final set of levels are unlocked at the end of the game, leading up to the final showdown. An additional level starring Beck's partner, Call, is also available at some point.

In addition to jumping and shooting, Beck's main ability is what the game calls "AcXelerate" (pronounced like "accelerate"), which can be used to move quickly and cross large gaps. Upon weakening enemies by shooting them, Beck can AcXelerate through them in order to absorb a substance known as Xel (pronounced "Cel"). Absorbing Xel from enemies grants Beck temporary enhancements, which are increased power for his attacks and the ability to shoot through walls (red), increased speed that allows Beck to run faster (green), and increased resistance to damage (yellow). There are also enemies that when weakened, turn blue. These enemies will refill the player's AcXel Recover 1 (AcXel Recover 2 is filled only at "Patch" checkpoints), which can be used to heal Beck. By defeating bosses, Beck can obtain new transformation forms, giving him new abilities such as magnetic limbs that can be used in various ways to deal with the enemies as well as traversing the levels. Conversely, Call can't absorb Xel but can boost further than Beck and can use "Patch service bot" that can activate a shield that reflects projectiles and slows her fall.

Raychel's (DLC) gameplay is also largely similar to Beck's gameplay, but with a few notable differences. Her default attack is a melee attack. She will instantly absorb any enemy whose health becomes too low (even if it isn't destabilized) to finish it off. Her counterpart to Beck's AcXelerate doubles as an attack and bounces off an enemy if they are not absorbed. Her health operates similarly to the way boss health works. She also earns different powers than Beck called "Variation Codes" from the bosses she defeats. The layouts of certain stages are altered to reflect this.

== Plot ==
Mighty No. 9 centers around an android named Beck (Yuri Lowenthal / Ayumu Murase), the ninth unit in a set of advanced combat and utility robots called the Mighty Numbers. A computer virus unleashed by a mysterious hacker suddenly corrupts the programming of the eight previous Mighty Numbers and hundreds of other machines across the world, causing them to turn on their human creators. The player, as Beck, must eliminate the other Mighty Numbers and uncover the identity of the villain who threatens the fate of the planet. Alongside Beck is his partner, Call (Julie Nathanson / M.A.O).

The game begins with a sudden massive countrywide robot uprising. Mighty No. 9, Beck, is one of the few robots unaffected. He is reluctantly tasked by the chief creator of the Mighty Numbers, Dr. White, to hunt down his siblings. Beck possesses a unique ability that allows him to assimilate the "Xels" of other robots when they have sustained sufficient damage. By assimilating the Xels of the Mighty Numbers, Beck is able to restore their original personalities. Assimilation also allows Beck to send data to Dr. White, who tries to find the cause of the robots' violent behavior. He also solicits the aid of White's bumbling colleague Dr. Sanda and his unaffected creation Call. Gregory Graham (Scott Whyte / Takehito Koyasu), president of Cherry Dynamics (the world's largest supplier of robots, also called "CherryDyn"), publicly denies responsibility for the current disaster and blames White's estranged mentor, Dr. Blackwell, despite the latter being in a maximum-security prison.

As Beck saves more of his siblings, White finds among the affected Xels traces of code from his abandoned project, "Trinity", a robot that can learn and grow infinitely by assimilating other robots. As Trinity was funded by CherryDyn, White decides to visit Graham while Call and Sanda go to Blackwell for a direct explanation. While infiltrating the prison, Call questions why White would make Beck a battle robot when he was primarily designed as a symbol of peace. Upon meeting Blackwell, Call and Sanda learn that the real cause of the countrywide uprising is Graham's failed attempt to reverse-engineer Trinity's design for military applications. Trinity can reprogram, rewrite, and assimilate other robots effortlessly; thus, she posed an incalculable danger to all of humanity and Blackwell, recognizing this, forced White to shut down the project. He was subsequently framed for terrorism and imprisoned, enabling Graham to bring White under his complete control.

Meanwhile, White confronts Graham about the latter's decision to restart Trinity, for which he again tries to deny responsibility. White mulls over how, despite Trinity being his greatest failure, he had taken what he had learned from her creation to perfect Beck, implying that Beck's aversion to combat is the only difference separating his fate from Trinity's. Graham then realizes that White is actually Blackwell's illegitimate son, Bill.

Just as Beck foils Trinity's plot to launch a massive war against humanity, the robot grows to the point where she begins to assimilate even non-robotic objects, and Beck, being the only one immune to her rewrite ability (though not immune to her assimilation), moves out alone to stop her. Beck successfully assimilates Trinity like he does with his siblings and eliminates her influence on all other robots. With the help of the other Mighty Numbers, Beck and Trinity (restored to her true, humanoid form) manage to escape.

Photos shown before the credits give an epilogue to the game, with Trinity befriending the other Mighty Numbers, White completing Trinity and giving her a proper body, and Beck, having accepted that peace can only be achieved through strength, taking part in a fighting tournament to hone his skills.

In a post-credits scene, White visits Blackwell in his cell to inform him of Trinity's change of heart and pitches the idea of a new symphonic heart routine that will help robots grow more responsibly. However, Blackwell scoffs that he got lucky and remains unconvinced (calling White "Bill" in the process); White, feeling unappreciated, vows to prove Blackwell and everyone who doubted him wrong. As the screen fades to black, Blackwell states that only time will tell if Beck is a blessing or a curse.

== Development ==
Mighty No. 9 was announced in a conference at the 2013 Penny Arcade Expo by Inafune and his team. The Kickstarter campaign for the project launched on August 31, 2013 and met its US$900,000 target only two days later, on September 2. 8-4, a localization company, handled the Japanese-to-English translation work for the project in addition to consulting and PR work. 2 Player Productions produced a four-part documentary series during the game's development, detailing every aspect that has gone into the creation of the game as well as providing developer commentary from Inafune and his team.

Mighty No. 9's concept was initially widely acclaimed for its return to the genre of Mega Man-styled games, going against the alleged neglect of the franchise by series owner Capcom. The game has been noted as one of the first crowd-funded video game projects launched in Japan.

Inafune had promised to provide "unprecedented access to seeing [his] team at work" over the development cycle of Mighty No. 9. In the video promoting the Kickstarter, Inafune stated that he wanted to make the project one where he could get the fans involved, following the cancellation of Mega Man Legends 3 which similarly sought to get fans involved with the game's development process. On September 4, 2013, it was announced that the two mystery stretch goals that were previously announced were to be pushed back in favor of attempting to release the game on consoles quickly. The mystery goals were still retained, and later revealed once funding reached the $2,200,000 goal and beyond. As each particular stretch goal was attained during the month of September, additional stretch goals were announced, pushing the final goal to the $4,000,000 mark. The first of the documentary series by 2 Player Productions was released on September 26.

The nine designs of Call used for the poll

An opinion poll was launched on September 27 to choose the design of Call, Beck's partner. The poll asks voters to choose among nine design choices labelled from A to I, all drawn by members of both Inti Creates and Comcept. The poll was closed and the result was posted on the evening of October 1, with designs E, F and H winning out. The game's soundtrack was composed primarily by Manami Matsumae, of Mega Man fame, with sound direction and additional compositions by Ippo Yamada. A single track each was also contributed by Takashi Tateishi of Mega Man 2 fame, and Masahiro Aoki.

On September 30, 2013, the game's use of Unreal Engine 3 was confirmed. The pledging campaign ended on October 1, 2013, raising $3,845,170 in total, and becoming the then sixth most funded project in Kickstarter history. An additional $201,409 obtained via PayPal increased the total money collected to $4,046,579, contributing to the achievement of all the stretch goals announced. In an interview published in an issue of Game Informer in October 2013, Inafune revealed he would not have ruled out Capcom, his former employer, as a potential publisher for the game, even if it meant re-skinning Mighty No. 9 as an actual Mega Man game. However, he added that he would only negotiate with Capcom if "they had the best terms". An official website for the game was launched on November 21, 2013, alongside a backer exclusive forum. On March 19, 2014, a development trailer was shown at the Game Developers Conference in San Francisco, California.

In an interview with Polygon in February 2014, Inafune expressed his interest in developing a larger meta-franchise for Mighty No. 9 beyond the release of the game, including a possible live action movie. Other adaptions included a "comic book, manga, anime, movie, TV drama series" among others. In discussion with Polygon, he stated that "it's not actually a 100 percent set deal yet," and that "it is something we are looking forward to and considering the possibilities of". In regards to a production company for the movie, he mentioned collaboration with Contradiction Studios as a possibility. Tim Carter, a Contradictions film writer and producer, revealed that his company was working on the film adaptation and that he had been in talks with Inafune.

On July 6, 2014, there was another crowd funding campaign for bonus content. The first stretch goal was to raise $200,000 for full English voice acting in the game. On October 30, 2014, Comcept asked via their Kickstarter page for an additional $198,000 to complete a DLC stage introducing Beck's rival: Ray.

At Anime Expo 2014, an animated series based on the game was announced by Keiji Inafune, with animations created by Tokyo-based Digital Frontier. The series was originally set to air in early 2016, but failed to do so without any official reasoning.

On July 7, 2015, it was announced that Legendary Pictures and Comcept would collaborate to make a Mighty No. 9 feature film.

Inafune had recently revealed new plans for a game, Red Ash: The Indelible Legend, that shared many similarities with Mighty No. 9, including the characters Beck and Call. The Kickstarter, unlike Mighty No. 9's, fell quite short of its US$800,000 goal, making only US$519,999. Despite the failed campaign, it was announced on July 30, 2015, that Chinese game company Fuze would finance the game.

Various delays and the announcement and subsequent failure of Inafune's other Kickstarter project, Red Ash: The Indelible Legend, were met with accusations of mismanagement and poor communication on part of the developers. In an interview, producer Nick Yu expressed apologies for the last delay, saying they were due to the multiplayer mode being still in development, while the solo campaign was already "100% done". Explaining why they didn't choose separate releases for the solo campaign and the multiplayer, Yu argued that it would necessitate two approvals and quality controls, which they simply couldn't afford. As for the Red Ash debacle, he explained that they needed to launch a new project as some of the company's employees who were not needed anymore on Mighty No. 9's development were jobless while the game was being finished, but also acknowledged that the issue was not communicated correctly to the public.

After the game was delayed for a third time in early 2016, Inafune expressed that the development staff had "no excuse" for disappointing fans and backers several times. Commentators claimed that the series of delays, combined with the promise at one point that there wouldn't be further delays, voided faith in the project, and hurt the image of Inafune and Comcept. They also claimed that future crowdfunding projects would need to take Mighty No. 9 as an example of a project going wrong, suffering from over-promising and failing to deliver. On May 25, 2016, Deep Silver published a new trailer for the game called "Masterclass", which went on to receive very negative feedback from the fans and the media. This includes the CEO of Inti Creates, Takuya Aizu, publicly criticising it on his Twitter, calling it "unforgivable" and scolding Deep Silver for it. The criticism for the trailer mostly centered around the poor narration script; a line reading "make the bad guys cry like an anime fan on prom night" was heavily ridiculed by many considering the game's target audience, its art style and the fact that Comcept's other project, Red Ash, had a planned anime.

In June 2017, Comcept reaffirmed to their backers that the portable Nintendo 3DS and PlayStation Vita versions were still due to be released by the end of 2017, and suggested the ports were delayed due to a "recent adjustment", likely referencing Level-5's acquisition of Comcept. Despite this claim, neither platform received the game by the end of 2017. After more than a year since the claimed reaffirmation, Destructoid attempted to contact both developer Comcept and Western publisher Deep Silver to ask regarding the status of the portable versions of Mighty No. 9, only to receive no response on the matter from either party. Comcept itself shut down in 2026.

Due to Comcept's decision to credit 67,226 eligible (out of 71,493 total) Kickstarter backers, the closing credits sequence is just under three hours and forty-eight minutes long, the longest in any media.

== Release ==
Digital copies of the game were guaranteed on release to those who pledged $20 on Kickstarter. An additional game manual, artbook/strategy guide, and the original soundtrack were guaranteed on release to those who pledged $40. Physical copies of the aforementioned rewards packaged inside a box adorned with art of the backer's choosing, alongside a playable golden version of Beck, were available to those who pledged $60. Further donations were given access to special items like extra bonus content or exclusive merchandise along access to beta versions and other collaborations with the game's development. Backers who donated at least US$10,000 earned the right to attend a dinner with Keiji Inafune.

The game originally was in development exclusively for Windows, but ports for Linux, OS X, PlayStation 3, PlayStation 4, Wii U, Xbox 360, Xbox One, Nintendo 3DS and PlayStation Vita were confirmed after the funding reached previously established stretch goals. In regards to the Nintendo 3DS release, the co-founder and director of Renegade Kid, Jools Watsham, publicly offered to assist in development. However, Comcept confirmed that it officially arranged to work with Abstraction Games on both portable versions of Mighty No. 9. In an unannounced move, the studio left the project in 2015, as development duties on the handheld builds quietly shifted to Engine Software. Abstraction would later say they got "involved very late" and exited "due to the risk involved."

An additional copy of Mighty No. 9 was made available to purchase as physical distribution, along with a backer's digital version. The physical copy was manifested in one of two forms of the backer's choice. The first was a DVD-ROM adorned with the game's illustration, available after the addition of $26 to the minimum pledge. The second was a USB flash drive also carrying the game's illustration, but molded in the appearance of either a Nintendo Entertainment System or Family Computer cartridge, available after the addition of $36 to the minimum pledge.

The game was originally scheduled to be released in April 2015. However, on April 28, 2015, Comcept announced that the PlayStation 4, Xbox One, PlayStation 3, Xbox 360, Wii U and Windows versions of the game would be released on September 15, 2015 in the Americas and September 18 worldwide, for both public retail and download (Xbox 360 and PlayStation 3 versions do not have a physical release however), so as to allow the company to take further time and resources to polish the game and to add Japanese and French voice-overs. The Vita version would be released at a later date. They also announced that they had partnered with Deep Silver to distribute the retail version of the game.

In August 2015, it was announced on the Comcept forums that the game was delayed once again to the first quarter of 2016, citing unresolved bugs and issues with the online feature. To make it up to backers of the game, Comcept gave Kickstarter backers access to a four-stage exclusive demo. In addition, they offered Steam codes of Mighty Gunvolt to backers on September 29. The demo was also delayed due to distribution issues, with some backers receiving it before the initial release. After previously promising no more delays of Mighty No. 9's release, on January 25, 2016, Inafune announced the game would be delayed a third time due to more bugs found. The final release date was later announced to be in Japan and North America on June 21, 2016, and in PAL regions on June 24, 2016, with even further delays on certain platforms, like Xbox 360, which launched a day later due to technical issues.

During a Twitch livestream of the game for the release of the game, Inafune, through translator Ben Judd stated "You know, I want to word this in a way to explain some of the issues that come with trying to make a game of this size on multiple platforms." adding "I'm kind of loath to say this because it's going to sound like an excuse and I don't want to make any excuses. I own all the problems that came with this game and if you want to hurl insults at me, it's totally my fault. I'm the key creator. I will own that responsibility." Ben Judd added his own thoughts, saying "In this case, it was do the base game and do all the ports all at the same time. And it ended up being a huge amount of work, more than they actually estimated. Definitely, when they looked at the project, they were wrong about a lot of things. They underestimated how much work, time and money was going to be necessary. All of those things create a huge amount of pressure." Later Ben Judd himself added “But, again, we can hope that if things go well, there'll be sequels. Because I'll tell you what, I'm not getting my 2D side-scrolling fill. And at the end of the day, even if it's not perfect, it's better than nothing. At least, that's my opinion.”

Despite an update to the game's Steam app data entry on July 21, 2016 concerning Mac and Linux development, the game's SteamOS and Mac icons were removed as of July 28, 2016 and no update was given until those versions launched on August 25, 2016.

Fangamer, the company who were contracted by Comcept to fulfill their Kickstarter physical rewards, announced in January 2017 that they were unable to ship all of the material to backers due to Comcept not giving them all the required assets.

On January 5th, 2025, Amazon cancelled pre-orders for the 3DS release ordered on the platform, nine years after the planned release.

== Reception ==
Reception

Aggregate score
Aggregator	Score			
Aggregator	PC	PS4	Wii U	Xbox One
Metacritic	52/100	52/100	48/100	55/100

Review scores
Publication	Score			
Publication	PC	PS4	Wii U	Xbox One
Destructoid	N/A	6.5/10	N/A	N/A
Electronic Gaming Monthly	N/A	N/A	N/A	7.5/10
Famitsu	N/A	30/40	30/40	30/40
Game Informer	N/A	N/A	N/A	6/10
GameRevolution	N/A	1.5/5	N/A	N/A
GameSpot	N/A	5/10	N/A	5/10
GamesRadar+	N/A	2.5/5	N/A	N/A
IGN	N/A	5.6/10	N/A	N/A
Nintendo Life	N/A	N/A	5/10	N/A
Nintendo World Report	N/A	N/A	5/10	N/A
PC Gamer (US)	54/100	N/A	N/A	N/A
Polygon	5/10	5/10	N/A	5/10
VideoGamer.com	N/A	5/10	N/A	N/A
Hardcore Gamer	2.5/5	N/A	N/A	N/A
NF Magazine	N/A	N/A	6/10	N/A

The PlayStation 4, Windows, and Xbox One versions of Mighty No. 9 received "mixed or average" reviews, while the Wii U version received "generally unfavorable" reviews, according to review aggregator website Metacritic. After the game's launch, the Kickstarter backers reportedly received broken codes and mismatched rewards. Due to the game's multiple delays, mediocre reception and an array of communication problems, many backers expressed their disappointment with the final game.

GameSpot awarded it a score of 5 out of 10, saying "Mighty No. 9 is an inoffensively average game sprung from the memories of the past, with little to show for its position in the present." IGN awarded it a score of 5.6 out of 10, saying "Charmless and full of poorly-executed ideas, Mighty No. 9 fails to entertain despite its legendary pedigree." Game Informer reviewer Andrew Reiner gave it a score of 6 out of 10, stating that "Too much of the content feels recycled, from enemies with shields to weapon designs coming close to being copied wholesale" and that "Unfortunately, none of the familiar content is as stylistic or lively as it once was. Mega Man's characters and artwork were consistent and unified; Comcept's take is largely pedestrian." The Wii U version also suffered from different technical issues. Polygon awarded it a score of 5 out of 10, stating that "This feels like an answer to why Capcom isn't making Mega Man games anymore."

Japanese gaming magazine Famitsu gave a more favorable view, awarding the game a score of 30 out of 40.
