= Soul Sacrifice (video game) =

2013 video game

- North American cover art
- Developers: Marvelous AQL; Japan Studio
- Publisher: Sony Computer Entertainment
- Director: Teruhiro Shimokawa
- Producers: Kentarou Motomura; Teruyuki Toriyama
- Designer: Keiji Inafune
- Composers: Yasunori Mitsuda; Wataru Hokoyama
- Platform: PlayStation Vita
- Release: Soul Sacrifice: JP: March 7, 2013; NA: April 30, 2013; AU: May 2, 2013; EU: May 3, 2013; Soul Sacrifice Delta: JP: March 6, 2014; NA: May 13, 2014; PAL: May 14, 2014
- Genre: Action role-playing
- Modes: Single-player, multiplayer

Soul Sacrifice (Note: Soul Sacrifice (ソウル・サクリファイス, Souru Sakurifaisu)) is a 2013 action role-playing video game developed by Marvelous AQL and Japan Studio and published by Sony Computer Entertainment for the PlayStation Vita.

The core mechanic of the game is the ability to sacrifice parts of the character's body or items to create devastating attacks. These sacrifices will be permanently marked on the player character's body, meaning that they are not an infinite resource that can be tapped into. The concept was created by Keiji Inafune. An expanded version of the game, Soul Sacrifice Delta, was released in 2014.

== Plot ==
The main protagonist of Soul Sacrifice is one of the innocent bystanders that has been enslaved by a powerful and cruel sorcerer known as Magusar, who absorbs human sacrifices to remain immortal. Just before the protagonist is going to be sacrificed, a talking book appears before them. The book, named Librom, is a collection of stories that describe past fights between monsters and the powerful sorcerer. The player character is able to enter the book's world and experience the fights in events known as Phantom Quests, thereby gaining the experience and power needed to defeat Magusar. The game has two endings depending on whether the player saves or sacrifices Magusar after his defeat. There is also a third ending that occurs if the player defeats Magusar before completing all of the main stories in Librom.

== Gameplay ==
Soul Sacrifice is played in the third-person perspective. The player character is a sorcerer who relives another sorcerer's memories through a journal. The character can be customized in various options and can change throughout the game. The abilities ("sacrifices") are part of this customization, which allows the game to have roles such as tank, ranged caster or melee DPS. The game features four-player cooperative play and the ability to sacrifice party members to destroy powerful foes. The slain party members are not given the usual recognition in a game, such as experience points. However, the player does gain bonus points for being sacrificed. Four-player cooperative play is only available on some quests, such as Inside Avalon (a portion of the journal).

=== Combat ===
Central to the combat system is the saving and sacrificing mechanics. When an enemy or ally is defeated, they collapse to the ground and you are given the choice to either save or sacrifice them. Saving an enemy restores a small portion of health, while saving an ally consumes 1/2 your current health but restores that ally back to the fight. Players can also choose to sacrifice their allies to create a powerful map wide damaging spell. However, sacrificed players can no longer be healed and enter a spectator type mode in which they can continue to watch the fight. Sacrificed players have the benefit of being able to see numerical damage figures and exact health bars. They are also able to tap the screen to either boost allies or weaken enemies. Sacrificed allies do not gain any additional experience from the fight, but do still gain mission rewards if the stage is cleared. Sacrificing an enemy restores charges to items known as offerings which are required for the casting of magic. Each offering has a set number of times it can be used without being recharged before it breaks. If all the charges on the offering are used, the offering will break and cannot be recharged in the normal fashion. Instead, broken offerings need to be repaired using Lacrima (Librom's tears), a type of in game currency which is awarded for clearing stages.

Players are also given the option to sacrifice a part of their own body when they receive enough damage. When a player chooses to sacrifice a part of themselves, they cast a powerful spell, known as black rites, which differs depending on what part of the body is being sacrificed but also suffer a semi-permanent status effect. For example, the player's defense is reduced by 50% for sacrificing their skin or their field of vision is reduced for sacrificing their eyes. This status effect remains active until players use Librom's Lacrima from the game menu to restore their broken bodies similar to restoring broken offerings.

=== Reward system ===
Soul Sacrifice uses a point/objective system to calculate mission rewards. Rewards come in the form of spell offerings. Each mission has at least three different offerings you can obtain from that mission, more if that mission has bosses in it. In addition to mission specific bonuses, performing certain tasks such as sacrificing an ally, being sacrificed, or using a forbidden spell will also grant players an additional offering as a reward. The normal mission rewards are broken into four ranks. Ranks are obtained by completing certain tasks for points. For example, successfully performing a counterattack is worth 10 points, while completing a stage without getting hit is worth 100 points. Because of this point system, being sacrificed by an ally after dying can be beneficial. Being sacrificed rewards both the player being sacrificed and the one performing the sacrifice with 100 points . The exact number of points for each rank changes depending on the mission. If the mission contains a boss, players can receive additional spells by "breaking" weak points on the boss. Each boss has a single break reward and that reward can be earned as many times as the boss has weak points (usually 2 or 3).

=== Multiplayer ===
Soul Sacrifice uses the PlayStation Network to allow up to three additional players to join the player in "Avalon Quests" which are side missions to the main storyline. The online component requires an online pass which is bundled with new copies of the program as well as obtainable through the PlayStation Store. Any progress made through the multiplayer is also added to their single player campaign. The game also allows for Ad-Hoc connections for local players to enjoy the game without using the PlayStation Network.

== Release ==
Soul Sacrifice was released worldwide throughout 2013 on March 7 in Japan, April 30 in North America, May 2 in Australia, and May 3 in Europe. In Japan, it was launched with a PlayStation Vita bundle that includes a cosmic-red-colored PS Vita system with a custom design on the back, red earphones, a 4GB memory card, a pouch, a strap, and a cloth. On April 12, 2013, Sony announced that the game demo would be released on April 17, 2013.

=== Soul Sacrifice Delta ===
In a conversation with IGN, Keiji Inafune has expressed his interest in making a sequel to Soul Sacrifice; "...To drive Vita sales even more, I have an idea for a Soul Sacrifice sequel. I'm actually approaching Sony Computer Entertainment regarding this project." He later went on to say; "Let's say the talks are ongoing and I'd love to make it happen." At SCEJA's 9\9 event, an expansion of the original game titled Soul Sacrifice Delta was announced. The game includes new bosses, a third faction called 'Grimm', co-op attacks and more. The game was released in Asian markets on March 6, 2014, in North America on May 13, 2014 and in the PAL region on May 14, 2014.

== Reception ==
Soul Sacrifice

Aggregate score
Aggregator	Score
Metacritic	77/100

Review scores
Publication	Score
Destructoid	8/10
Electronic Gaming Monthly	6/10
Eurogamer	7/10
Famitsu	37/40
Game Informer	7.25/10
GameRevolution	4/5
GameSpot	7.5/10
GamesTM	6/10
GameTrailers	7.6/10
GameZone	9.5/10
IGN	7.7/10
Joystiq	3.5/5
PlayStation Official Magazine – UK	8/10
Polygon	6.5/10
Digital Spy	4/5
The Escapist	4/5

Soul Sacrifice received "generally favorable reviews" according to the review aggregation website Metacritic. Most reviewers concurred that the game has addictive gameplay and a very detailed combat system, but lamented the poorly-programmed AI allies and repetitive level designs and enemies. Japanese reviewers gave the game favorable scores; most notably, Famitsu gave Soul Sacrifice a score of one ten and three nines for a total of 37 out of 40.

Forbes gave it a score of 8.5 out of 10, saying, "It's fun enough to make its shortcomings less important, though certainly not to overlook them entirely." Toronto Sun gave it a favorable review and called it "a must-buy if you already own a Vita, and with its release there's never been a better moment to pick one up." Digital Spy similarly gave it four stars out of five and called it "one of the deepest and most interesting games available for Sony's handheld. The dark fantasy style and slightly repetitive missions might put some people off, but if you're looking to invest a lot of time into a game and don't mind sacrificing your social life, Keiji Inafune's latest is just the game for you." The Escapist likewise gave it four stars out of five and stated, "While the game is a little limited by the platform, the underlying mechanics will capture a certain style of player." However, 411Mania gave it a score of 7.4 out of 10, saying, "Repetitive missions aside, Soul Sacrifice is a worthwhile experience on the Vita. I find myself coming back to the game to get new weapons and run bosses with friends. It's an enjoyable experience that gets better as you get stronger, and may be a good title for a lot of Vita owners to get back into the handheld." Slant Magazine gave it three-and-a-half stars out of five and called it "a game that's most arresting when experienced alone, its grim story one of intensifying emptiness and detachment. Regardless of its irregular pratfalls, there's something to be said for a title this dark that excels primarily in short bursts rather than prolonged, daylight-avoiding tests of mental pertinacity." The Digital Fix likewise gave it seven out of ten and said that the game "can stand on its own feet proudly, but it's the potential of the birth of a franchise that should get gamers everywhere smiling into their Mountain Dew." Edge gave it a score of six out of ten and called it "a brave game that dares to weaken players in one way as it empowers them in another. Concept may be wrong in thinking Monster Hunter would be better if it was just about hunting monsters, but Soul Sacrifice is courageous and thematically bold enough to distinguish itself from the clones that have followed in the wake of Capcom's phenomenon."

Soul Sacrifice was a breakout hit in Japan, and one of the most successful debuts for a new intellectual property from Japan Studio on a handheld system. The game sold 92,396 copies of the standard physical retail version and 22,050 copies of the special Double Pack within the first week of release in Japan. Sales reached almost 200,000 copies in the second week. Soul Sacrifice was the fifth most purchased digital Vita game on the Japanese PlayStation Network in 2013.

=== Soul Sacrifice Delta ===
Soul Sacrifice Delta

Aggregate score
Aggregator	Score
Metacritic	82/100

Review scores
Publication	Score
Famitsu	37/40
GameRevolution	4/5
GamesTM	8/10
GameZone	10/10

The enhanced Soul Sacrifice Delta received a bit more favorable reviews than the original according to Metacritic. In Japan, Famitsu also gave it a score of one ten and three nines for a total of 37 out of 40.

Soul Sacrifice Delta sold 48,786 physical retail copies during its first week of release in Japan, topping the software sales charts for that particular week.
