= Mega Man Star Force 2 =

2007 video game

- North American cover art of the two different versions
- Developer: Capcom Production Studio 2
- Publisher: Capcom
- Director: Masakazu Eguchi
- Producer: Takeshi Horinouchi
- Designers: Masahiro Yasuma; Yusuke Tokita; Yutaka Utsugi; Kohei Ozaki
- Artist: Yuji Ishihara
- Writers: Teruhiro Shimogawa; Shinsuke Kodama; Shin Kurosawa; Hiroshi Yamashita; Kosuke Nasu
- Composers: Marika Suzuki; Yoshino Aoki
- Series: Mega Man Star Force
- Platform: Nintendo DS
- Release: JP: November 22, 2007; NA: June 24, 2008; PAL: October 31, 2008
- Genre: Action role-playing
- Modes: Single-player, multiplayer

Mega Man Star Force 2: Zerker × Ninja and Mega Man Star Force 2: Zerker × Saurian are action role-playing games developed by Capcom for the Nintendo DS. It is the sequel to Mega Man Star Force and the second game in the Mega Man Star Force trilogy. The game was first confirmed on April 12, 2007 in an issue of CoroCoro Comic. The same issue also revealed that a boss design contest would be held exclusively in Japan much like the same contests held for the Battle Network games. A sequel, Mega Man Star Force 3, was released on November 13, 2008 in Japan.

In a similar format to Mega Man Battle Network 5: Double Team DS, each game card contains two versions of the game, available as Zerker × Ninja (ベルセルク×シノビ, Berserk × Shinobi) and Zerker × Saurian (ベルセルク×ダイナソー, Berserk × Dinosaur). Both versions were later compiled in Mega Man Star Force Legacy Collection (2026).

== Gameplay ==
=== Battle system ===
Mega Man Star Force 2 is an action RPG much in the same vein as the first game. It is rendered in an isometric style (sprites, views, etc.) during field gameplay, but its battle system is three-dimensional, with the battles being viewed from behind Mega Man, and movement restricted to only left and right. Since enemies have a much larger playing field, battle evasion seems limited, but the player is given a choice of techniques like shielding and homing attacks to keep battles balanced. Mega Man's life is a simple "Hit point" (HP) numerical system. When he takes damage, the number lowers, and when it reaches "zero," the game is over and the player must restart from their last save point. HP can be recovered in a number of ways, both in and out of battle. The player can also use their standard Mega Buster at any time to combat with, and upgrade items for Omega-Xis can be collected throughout the game to increase the Mega Buster's rate, power, and charge speed. The Mega Buster is constantly charging to release a single powerful shot, but the player can hold the button down to fire rapidly.

Battle Cards are collected in a number of ways throughout the game, and the player must organize them into a folder to use for battles. Every time the "Custom Gauge" fills during battle, Cards are called up at random and are selected to use against the enemies. There are three different classes of Cards ranked by their power and rarity; Standard, Mega, and Giga with being able to choose a number of favorite cards to send over Nintendo Wi-fi Connection. Favorite cards were reduced in number from 6 to 4.One notable difference in folder building is the addition of Star cards and the reduction of favorite cards. Star Cards are won from Giant Viruses, bigger forms of normal viruses. They will have 1-6 stars, and increase the attack power of regular cards with the same name. While they do not count towards the 3 same-card limit, players can only have one copy of a particular star card in a folder at a time, and may only have three in their folders at once. The four elements include heat, aqua, elec, and wood. Elements are attached to certain attacks and to enemies defenses. When an element is hit with an element that it is weak to, double-damage is dealt. Heat is weak against aqua but strong against wood, aqua is weak against elec but strong against heat, elec is weak against wood but strong against aqua, and wood is weak against heat but strong against elec.

A screenshot depicting a battle sequence against EM Wave Viruses using the Wood Ninja (or "Green Shinobi") form.

=== Transformations ===
Tribe On

Three transformations exist in Star Force 2. These transformations consist of "Thunder Zerker" ("Thunder Berserk" in Japan), "Wood Ninja" ("Green Shinobi" in Japan), and "Fire Saurian" ("Fire Dinosaur" in Japan), and are activated by using a technique called "Tribe On", which can be used once Geo and Omega-Xis find a special artifact (identified in-game as an "OOPArt"). Players who get all the OOPArts go into Tribe King form. Players do this by using OOPArt cards, or Brotherband cards to transform. The transformation feature has been implemented differently in the U.S. release. The "OOPArt cards" have been removed, and as a result, transforming is only possible with brother cards or automatically with certain abilities mentioned in a later paragraph.

Using a technique called "Double Tribe," two of the three transformations can be combined to create one of six possible combinations. Double Tribe is achieved by using a brother card from a different tribe while in Tribe On mode. If a brother card from the same tribe is used, the roulette of the brother's favorites will occur instead. A final transformation - Tribe King - is also possible by activating a third tribe transformation when in a Double Tribe form; However, the Tribe King effect only lasts for three turns.

In addition to tribes, if the player is hit by an attack of the element that the current player's tribe is weak to (e.g. the player is using Wood Ninja and is hit by a fire attack), the transformation will be lost and they will return to their original state. With the Double Tribe state, players take on the element of the second transformation. Also, although there are three tribes, six Double Tribe combinations, and one triple tribe, only four transformations are possible in any version of the game (a players tribe, a players tribe x the two other tribes, and tribe king) as the players will always transform to the version they are playing first regardless of the Brother's tribe, although Wave cards allow player to transform to any form.

Rogue

A player who does not take advantage of the "Brotherband" system can take on forms based on Rogue, the rival character in this and the following game. Each tribe has a Rogue transformation. There are two ways to utilize Rogue Form. The first and normally legitimate way is to equip the six Indie Proofs on a Brotherband. Once the proofs are equipped the player gets a card which allows them to transform into the player's tribe, specific to the version. The second way to use Rogue form is to use a special "Wave Command". Rogue Form players suffer from a lack of LP, having a maximum of 400 LP (From maximized In-game brothers) instead of the absolute Maximum of 1300 LP that regular players can reach (400+150x6) thanks to Brotherbands. However Giga cards can still be used in Rogue form.

In this stage the player can not use any mega cards, but still gain skills such as a barrier that generates every turn. The Rogue Form also has no element, meaning it cannot be lost due to element advantages. Boosts from the tribe on form are also lost, instead, cards that deal 'sword' damage get a +50 attack Boost. The wave command way has the advantages over the original version as it gets certain bonuses, such as a large HP boost, Max Buster stats, Giga+1, and the Auto-ability waves First Barrier, Float Shoes, and Undershirt. Player also get to keep their Brotherbands. However, their power-ups are disabled as if players are in Rogue form, but turning off the ability gives them back. When players are in rogue form, Brotherbands with their friends will end. The main difference between the two versions is the Indie Frag Rogue Form can be activated on a player's will, using it as a strategic advantage (such as burning mega cards). The Wave command starts off a player in Rogue Tribe, meaning Mega cards aren't usable no matter what (as the form cannot be lost prematurely in battle)

New to this game are abilities, which is similar in concept to the Navi Customizer from the Battle Network series, and Link Power which is obtained by forming a Brotherband with both the four in-game brothers and with the player's real life friends, as well as an "auto-brother" which is named by the player. Abilities are equipped using Link Power, and the player can only equip as many abilities as there is link power. Link Power also has other uses in the game, such as acquiring new items. Certain amounts of Link Power are also required to take on some side-quests. In addition, if a certain ability is equipped, Mega Man can automatically start a battle in his "Tribe On" state. The player's Link Power that they give is determined to their accomplishments in the game.

=== Wave Command Cards ===
The game also makes use of 279 Wave Command Cards, actual physical cards with numbered holes on them that players can lay on the touch screen of the DS. By touching the numbers in order on certain in-game screens, the cards unlock special items, combos, bosses and cards in the game. These cards were only released in Japan but Capcom licensed Prima Publishing to print the Wave Command Card Perfect File as the "Wave Command Card Kit" in the US. This book shows all the cards and the numbers on them so US players can use all the cards. However, the instructions in the book suffer from poor translation and as a result, either make no sense at all or are simply wrong. There are three cards (specifically three of the "Mega Man Data Cards": Zerker, Ninja, and Saurian) that were misprinted with no numbers on them making them impossible to use. Additionally, while explanations of these cards are listed in the Table of Contents as being on page 9, the explanations do not appear at all. It was unknown whether or not this was intentional (i.e., in order to get the players to figure them out for themselves), or if the book had simply gone through a rushed print. Prima has recently released an update fixing the missing number issue, indicating the latter.

One special thing to note is that if the player takes all 3 Auto Tribe cards (Zerker, Ninja and Saurian), and layers them on top of each other, 6 slots will be left. If they press them in order from left to right, then top to bottom, The character will activate Auto-Tribe King, which will allow the player to use Tribe King for the next battles. All Auto-tribes will last until the game is reset or turned off.

Due to the inclusion of these Auto Forms, most specifically, Auto Tribe King, expert players are often given a hard time by unprofessional using Tribe King (as the WCCs are still active on Wifi), which has a mostly unavoidable charge attack and multiplies all card damage by 2.

The Wave command cards are actually not necessary to activate them. Simply pressing the corresponding spots in order activates them, thus removing the necessity of buying the cards if the player knows where to look.

The European version does not have Wave command cards.

== Plot ==
The game stars a fifth-grade student named Geo Stelar, and his AM-ian partner, Omega-Xis. Set approximately two months after the events of Mega Man Star Force, Geo has adjusted to life with Omega-Xis, and has made many new friends. At the beginning of the game, Geo is eager to receive a new transfer known as a Star Carrier that he has waited two months for.

One day, Geo and his friends decide to travel to the technological hub of Wilshire Hills in IFL City, where they witness a new device known as the Star Carrier at work. The Star Carrier is able to take radio waves and transform them into material objects, known as Matter Waves. While watching a movie, Geo and his friends witness an attack by a mysterious man named Hyde, who partners with an Unidentified Mysterious Animal, or UMA, named Phantom in order to wreak havoc. After fusing with Phantom, Hyde becomes Dark Phantom. When Dark Phantom is defeated by Mega Man, he flees, and from that point forward becomes one of the game's antagonists.

Hyde is later revealed to work for Dr. Vega, a mad scientist who is obsessed with reviving the lost continent of Mu. She has allied herself with Solo who can wave change into his alter ego Rogue, the last survivor of Mu, and the UMAs to achieve this goal.

The game is from this point forward presented episodically, following a basic formula: Hyde and his UMA allies target humans that are unsatisfied with their lives, promising them power and influence. However, unlike the merge between Geo and Omega-Xis, these humans merge somewhat involuntarily and lose control of their bodies during the conversion. Mega Man has to defeat them in order to rescue the human from the enemy UMA's control.

After a few days, Geo goes on a date with Sonia Strumm to the museum. There, Solo appears and tries to steal the OOPArt, a device of incredible power which Vega seeks. After Omega-Xis accidentally eats the OOPArt, Geo and Mega start to have weird dreams where the OOPArt is trying to take over their body. Days later, Solo goes to Echo Ridge to recover the OOPArt from Geo. During the process, Geo and Solo have a Wave Battle in their both forms of Mega Man and Rogue. After the battle, Solo is convinced that in order to make Geo more powerful, he first must destroy his bonds, using a machine that makes a Black Hole; causing Sonia, Bud and Zack to disappear. Luna was rescued by Geo before she was taken away like the others. Geo tormented himself about this event, believing that he was not powerful enough to rescue the others. When Hyde kidnaps Luna, Mega Man has to use the OOPArt's power. Before he was eaten away by the OOPArt, Luna's voice gives him the Link Power to take control of the OOPArt. Afterwards the power of the OOPArt is his to use the Tribe On.

Many events later, the OOPArt is taken from Mega Man by Hyde and its power is used by Vega to revive Mu. The OOPArt has left some of its power inside Omega-Xis so he is still able to use the Tribe On. Megaman finds Mu in the Bermuda Maze and defeats the enemies inside (with some help from Rogue) and finds Vega. After Mega Man defeats Le Mu, Vega reveals her true motive. When her lover Altair (the only person she ever formed a Brotherband with) died after being sent to war, she became bitter, and began to blame the world for taking Altair from her. To this end, she became a scientist, with her research leading to the invention of matter waves (and by extension, the Star Carrier). Using this technology, she was able to recreate a holographic image of Altair. However, he did not have Altair's memories; he was merely a hollow shell who nonetheless served Vega faithfully (hence the name "Hollow"). After learning about the lost continent of Mu, she began to make plans to revive it in the hopes that Mu's "advanced technology" would be able to revive Altair, leading to the events of the game. She asks Le Mu to use the last of his powers to drop Mu from the sky and crush the Earth below. Just then, Le Mu lets off an explosion that blows Mega Man and Vega away. Hollow saves Vega, but dies in the progress. His prayers reach Altair who tells Vega to not seek revenge on the world and instead lead a happy life. Mega Man goes up to Le Mu and destroys him with the support of the voices of his friends. Just then, he collapses from full exhaustion as Mu falls into the ocean with the OOPArt. Geo wakes up to find out that Solo had saved him. However, he insists he didn't do it out of charity, saying "Your body got in my way, so I carried it here". Solo wishes to challenge Geo again one day and leaves as Geo reunites with his friends.

== Development ==
About two months following the CoroCoro Comic announcement, the Shooting Star Rockman Ultimate Navigation Legend Guidebook was released in Japan. Inside of it, the first details about the game were revealed through an interview with series director Masahiro Yasuma. Along with the interview was a silhouette of a new sword-themed transformation set to appear in the sequel (later revealed to be the Thunder Zerker form). Many elements from the original game remain intact including the roles of Geo Stelar (Subaru Hoshikawa in Japan) and Omega-Xis (Warrock) as the protagonists and the prominence of the Brotherband System. However, the interview made mention of more advanced transformations, freer movement in battle, a strong rival character for Geo (revealed to be Rogue, a wave human who gets his strength from loneliness, the alter ego of Solo, his human form), and online battles using the Nintendo Wi-Fi Connection.

The interview also noted that the game's production was roughly 30% complete at the time and was expected to be released winter 2007 in Japan.

== Audio ==
In the Japanese version, voice acting is featured in this title similarly to the DS version of Mega Man Battle Network 5, with Fuyuka Oura—the voice actress for Geo in the Japanese anime—reprising her role in the game. Unlike the US/PAL version of Mega Man Battle Network 5: Double Team DS, there is no voice acting in the US/PAL version.

Music

The game's music was composed by Yoshino Aoki and Mitsuhiko Takano and released as the second disc of the Ryūsei no Rockman 1 & 2 Original Soundtrack (流星のロックマン１＆２オリジナル・サウンドトラック, Ryūsei no Rokkuman wan ando tsū orijinaru saundotorakku; Shooting Star Rockman 1 & 2 Original Soundtrack) compilation.

Track listing
1. "Shooting Star (Ver. RR2)"
2. "Hometown" (ホームタウン, Hōmutaun)
3. "Roppondō Hills" (ロッポンドーヒルズ, Roppondō Hiruzu; Wilshire Hills)
4. "Yaeba Resort" (ヤエバリゾート, Yaeba Rizōto; Grizzly Peak Resort)
5. "Donburā-ko" (ドンブラー湖, Donburā-ko; Loch Mess)
6. "Nansuka-mura" (ナンスカ村, Nansuka-mura; Whazzup Village)
7. "Wave Square"
8. "Wave World"
9. "Sky Wave" (スカイウェーブ, Sukai wēbu)
10. "Warning Bell!!"
11. "Obake kyōsōkyoku" (オバケ狂想曲, Obake kyōsōkyoku; Ghosts' Rhapsody)
12. "Snowstorm"
13. "Kotei tansa" (湖底探査, Kotei tansa; Investigation of the Lakebottom)
14. "Araburu chijō-e" (荒ぶる地上絵, Araburu chijō-e; Ruined Picture on the Ground)
15. "Bermuda rabirinsu" (バミューダラビリンス, Bamyūda rabirinsu; Bermuda Maze)
16. "Mū-tairiku" (ムー大陸, Mū-tairiku; The Continent of Mu)
17. "Horobi no Requiem" (滅びのレクイエム, Horobi no rekuiemu; Destruction's Requiem)
18. "Orihime no tēma" (オリヒメのテーマ, Orihime no tēma; Vega's Theme)
19. "Kokō no senritsu" (孤高の旋律, Kokō no senritsu; Aloof Melody)
20. "Jiken hassei!!" (事件発生！！, Jiken hassei!!; Occurrence of an Incident!!)
21. "Fuon na kūki" (不穏な空気, Fuon na kūki; Turbulent Atmosphere)
22. "My Friends"
23. "Sentimental" (センチメンタル, Senchimentaru)
24. "Denpa henkan!!" (電波変換！！, Denpa henkan!!; Electromagnetic Wave Change!!)
25. "Tatakai no jokyoku" (戦いの序曲, Tatakai no jokyoku; Prelude to Battle)
26. "Ride On"
27. "Wave Battle"
28. "Kami to no taiji" (神との対峙, Kami to no taiji; Confrontation with a God)
29. "Network" (ネットワーク, Nettowāku)
30. "Road To Victory"
31. "Skyhigh Colosseum" (スカイハイコロシアム, Sukaihai Koroshiamu)
32. "Winner Of Skyhigh"
33. "Kizamareta kioku-tachi" (刻まれた記憶たち, Kizamareta kioku-tachi; Engraved Memories)

== Reception ==
Reception

Aggregate scores
Aggregator	Score
GameRankings	59% (Zerker x Ninja); 57% (Zerker x Saurian)
Metacritic	55/100 (Zerker x Ninja); 55/100 (Zerker x Saurian)

Review scores
Publication	Score
1Up.com	D+
Famitsu	32/40
GamePro	6.5/10
GameSpot	5.5/10
GameSpy	2.5/5
IGN	5/10
Nintendo Power	7/10

The two versions of Mega Man Star Force 2 were the eighth and ninth best-selling video games in Japan during their week of release, each selling 37,000 units. Both versions combined sold approximately 225,221 units in Japan by the end of 2007 and a total of 291,962 units in the region by the end of 2008.

As for critical reception, the game fared poorly. Common phrases used were "more of the same" and "unchanged." Likely referring to the lack of advancement in graphics or game play. The third game toted similar reviews, with below average scoring and the same complaints.

Sales continued to decline with the third entry, making the second entry the highest selling as well as the lowest review scoring. Mega Man Star Force 2 saw heavy competition in the RPG genre with the likes of Pokémon Platinum and Monster Hunter.
