= Mega Man Battle Network 4 =

- North American Red Sun version box art
- Developer: Capcom Production Studio 2
- Publisher: Capcom
- Producer: Keiji Inafune
- Designer: Masahiro Yasuma
- Artists: Yuji Ishihara; Kyoko Arima; Hayato Kaji
- Writers: Masakazu Eguchi; Hiroshi Yamashita
- Composer: Toshihiko Horiyama
- Series: Mega Man Battle Network
- Platform: Game Boy Advance
- Release: JP: December 12, 2003; NA: June 29, 2004; PAL: September 3, 2004
- Genre: Real-time tactical role-playing
- Modes: Single-player, multiplayer

Mega Man Battle Network 4 (Note: Known in Japan as Rockman EXE 4 (Japanese: ロックマンエグゼ4, Hepburn: Rokkuman Eguze 4)) is a 2004 tactical role-playing game developed by Capcom for the Game Boy Advance (GBA) handheld game console. It is the fourth game in the Mega Man Battle Network series. The European version featured a completely different logo, which was also used on other Mega Man titles. Like Battle Network 3 before it, Battle Network 4 has two different versions, Red Sun (Note: Known in Japan as Tournament Red Sun) and Blue Moon, (Note: Known in Japan as Tournament Blue Moon) that differ in story and gameplay details. Battle Network 4 is compatible with the e-Reader, and can be linked up with Rockman EXE 4.5 Real Operation and the Battle Chip Gate for NetBattles. It is able to link with Mega Man Zero 3, and contains references to Konami's Boktai series. The game was re-released via the Wii U Virtual Console in 2015, and as part of the Mega Man Battle Network Legacy Collection compilation in 2023.

== Plot ==
At a space research center known as NAXA, scientists discover a massive asteroid speeding toward the Earth that would cause the extinction of all life. After a call is put out to the world's greatest scientists, including the father of the main protagonists Yuichiro Hikari and a man known as Dr. Regal, they decide to direct the asteroid off-course with a laser. When that plan fails, Regal suggests searching for a world-class Net Operator and NetNavi.

Meanwhile, main protagonists Lan Hikari and MegaMan.EXE experience trouble both in and around their hometown of ACDC and on the Net. After fighting ShadeMan.EXE, he drops unknown data which is later revealed to be a DarkChip, a program described as unleashing great power at the cost of a Navi's "soul." The duo are warned to never use it under any circumstances.

With no leads to go on, the duo decide to participate in the local Den Battle Tournament. After becoming the champions, they return home to find it burglarized by someone connected to the DarkChip. Upon investigation, they discover that the DarkChip Syndicate Nebula was behind the attack of their home, looking for the DarkChip in their possession. The pair again fight ShadeMan and decide that they have no other option to defeat him than to use the DarkChip. After entering and becoming champions of the Eagle or Hawk Tournament (depending on the game version), Lan and MegaMan encounter LaserMan.EXE, another Nebula Navi, who shows MegaMan the DarkSoul within him as a result of using the DarkChip.

Following Regal's suggestion to search for a world class Operator and Navi, Lan and MegaMan are invited to the Red Sun/Blue Moon Tournament in the country of Netopia. After winning the tourney, the duo travel to NAXA and are briefed on the situation and learn that the asteroid headed for Earth has a computer in it and can be steered away with a Navi. Regal then reveals himself as the leader of Nebula and announces that the asteroid was a part of his plan all along. In the asteroid computer, MegaMan again fights LaserMan (now revealed as Regal's Navi), as well as Duo.EXE, the operating system of the asteroid who thinks Earth is "evil" and must be cleansed. MegaMan defeats both of them and convinces Duo that the planet is worthy of avoiding destruction. Duo and the asteroid leave and Regal jumps off of the NAXA tower to avoid prosecution.

== Gameplay ==
Battle Network 4 differs from Battle Network 3 in many ways, the most notable of which is the concept of DoubleSoul (Soul Unison in the original). DoubleSoul is similar to how the classic-style Mega Man could acquire the weapons of the Robot Masters that he has defeated: by using DoubleSoul, Mega Man.EXE could use the powers of other NetNavis in the same manner as how classic Mega Man could use the powers of the Robot Masters through their weapons. To perform a DoubleSoul, which lasts for a temporary amount of time (three turns), however, a chip must be sacrificed for the battle.

Some Double Soul examples and their abilities are:

- Roll Soul:
  Obtained from Roll after defeating her in the second tournament. Requires a Healing chip as a sacrifice. Only available in Red Sun version.
  Each chip used will heal 10 HP, and the Charge Shot becomes Roll Arrow, which causes 20 HP of damage.
- Proto Soul:
  Obtained from Protoman after defeating him in the fourth tournament. Requires a Sword chip as a sacrifice. Only available in Blue Moon version.
  Each Sword chip will get a boost of damage. The Charge Shot turns into Long Sword, which causes 60 HP of damage and goes through 2 panels in straight path.

Another key feature is that it takes a minimum of three playthroughs of the game's main story mode in order to uncover all of its secrets - although many criticize the game for the same reason. After each playthrough, a player is permitted to either continue with their existing game or to start a new game at a higher level of difficulty, although any save at a higher level of difficulty will overwrite a save of the lower level. Thus, it is important for players who want to collect all chips and power-ups to be sure that all blue/purple mystery data and all V1 virus' chips and program advances have been collected before starting Level 2. The same is true for going on to Level 3.

DarkChips, which are powerful chips resulting in a host of negative side-effects, make their debut in this game: a mood indicator in the corner of the screen shows MegaMan's emotional state during the battle. Normally, he's calm, but if he gets hit too often, he will get anxious and two random DarkChips from a list of eight will appear in Mega Man's Custom Screen. Each DarkChip will have many negative (and notable permanent) side-effects and can taint MegaMan's own soul with darkness. Should the darkness overwhelm MegaMan, he will find a different selection of chips are made available to use, with a different selection of Program Advances (like the infamous "DarkNeo" Program Advance, which involves the Bass GigaChip) therein. Also, when a DarkChip is used (aside from the battle with Shade Man in the ToyRobo and in free tournaments at Higsby's shop), MegaMan permanently loses 1 HP for each and cannot regain all HP lost, even if purified, and also MegaMan will lose the Charge Shot as well. There are also special chips (like the 5 evil chips) that can only be used if MegaMan is completely consumed by dark power, but the main drawback by using is that Double Soul will no longer be available to use unless the player gets in Full Synchro several times, removing the Dark Soul corruption from MegaMan little by little. Conversely, if MegaMan does enough battles without ever using a Dark Chip, he will turn brighter in color and allow him to more easily achieve Full Synchro mode.

=== Emotion Window ===
The Emotion Window is a mood indicator that lets the operator know MegaMan's current state based on fighting performance. The window also changes whenever DoubleSoul is used, to a mugshot of the corresponding Soul used. Normally, MegaMan is calm, but different circumstances can alter his emotional state in battle.

Full Synchro is a heightened state of focus gained by performing a counter-attack against a virus (I.e. attacking the virus with a chip just before it attacks). In this state, Battlechip attacks are doubled in strength. It is possible to consecutively achieve Full Synchro by continuously counter-attacking and thus doubling effectiveness in battle. Full Synchro expires when the player fails to counter-attack a virus, when MegaMan suffers damage or after ten seconds without using and attack chip.

Conversely, when a fight is not playing in MegaMan's favor, unless in a DoubleSoul, he becomes anxious, and following this, two Darkchips begin to display themselves in the Custom Screen. Also during this emotional state, DoubleSoul transformations are disabled. The player can return to a normal, calm state by successfully counter-attacking a virus, restoring HP, scoring hits on the enemy, or winning the battle.

If, during battle, MegaMan suffers huge damage in one second, or if he is stunned or in a state of knockback for a period of time, he goes into a state of rage which is similar to Full Synchro in the way that it doubles Battlechip attack power, but instead of a focused expression in the emotion window, Mega Man has an angry expression and in the battle screen he glows orange. As such, it can be considered a desperation state which gives the player a chance to turn the battle towards their favor. Rage will expire when the player attacks and damages a virus, or if the player successfully counter-attacks, at which point the player will instead go into Full Synchro. It also expires after a while if no chip is used. Unlike Full Synchro, if Mega Man is hit while in rage, he will not revert to his normal emotion. During "Full Synchro" and "Rage" Mega Man's attacks double, giving him an extra advantage.

The Emotion Window is a feature that has lived on in the Battle Network 5 and 6 games. The basic functions of the Emotion Window stated above (Full Synchro, Anxiety, and Rage) have not changed since, though the Evil emotion has been removed in Battle Network 6, replaced with Tired and Very Tired status.

=== Battle Chips ===
"Battle Network 4" brings out many new chips, with standard chips weighing in with 150 unique attacks. Mega Chips fell in number from the previous game, only having 60 different chips. Instead of V1, V2, V3, V4, and V5 chips (previously found in Battle Network 1 and 2 with V4 and V5 chips found only in 3) are now (Navi), (Navi)SP, (Navi)DS. Five version-exclusive Giga Chips appear in each version. There are 56 new kinds of chips, called, Secret Chips. Most of these are obtained by winning Higsby's "Free Tournaments", though there are a few exceptions. For example, the player may obtain the "Z-Saber" chip by linking their game with a copy of Mega Man Zero 3. There are eight DarkChips in this game with bad effects to your Navi's soul and emotions. (See above section for information on DarkChips.)

=== Title Screen Badges ===
In the previous two games, players earned different colored stars on the title screen for completing certain tasks. Battle Network 4 replaces these with badges (sometimes called icons or marks instead) on the top of the title screen, and continues these for the remainder of the series. Battle Network 4 includes seven icons, one for defeating the final boss Duo, one for getting all Soul Unisons, one for collecting all Standard-level battlechips, one for all Mega-level chips, one for all Giga-level chips, one for completing all Program Advances, and the last for defeating Bass (Forte in Japanese) in his Omega form.

=== Operation Battle Mode ===
Linking any edition of Mega Man Battle Network 4 with the Battle Chip Gate expansion for Game Boy Advance (sold in Japan only) would allow to play as a Navi, depending on what Navi chip the player owns. Instead of selecting chips like in normal gameplay, the custom gauge at the top would fill up and change to four different colors as it filled up, white, yellow, and blue, and red. When the bar is yellow, a regular chip can be used. When it is blue, a mega chip can be used, and at red a giga chip. Shooting fills the gauge up faster.

== Development ==
This game is known to become unplayable on original Nintendo DS systems. If the player leaves, and then returns to, the map while in Park Area during WoodMan's scenario, the game will hang indefinitely. This incompatibility was officially acknowledged by Nintendo. It does not occur on any other Nintendo DS family system or on any Game Boy Advance family systems.

Capcom of Japan gathered together their surplus of Rock Man EXE 4: Tournament Red Sun and Rock Man EXE 4: Tournament Blue Moon games and put them in a special edition box that was released in Japan only on December 31, 2004, along with a special E-Card for the E-Reader.

== Reception ==
Reception

Aggregate scores
Aggregator	Score
GameRankings	69% (Blue Moon); 71% (Red Sun)
Metacritic	67/100 (Blue Moon); 68/100 (Red Sun)

Review scores
Publication	Score
1Up.com	B−
Famitsu	34/40
Game Informer	7/10
GamePro	2.5/5
GameSpot	6.8/10
GameSpy	3/5
IGN	6.5/10
Nintendo Power	3.7/5

The two versions of Mega Man Battle Network 4 entered Japanese sales charts as the second and fourth best-selling games of their release week and continued to appear on the top 10 best-sellers list for the following six weeks. The game sold 535,836 copies combined by the end of 2003 and an additional 393,014 copies by the end of 2004. Mega Man Battle Network 4 has sold 1.35 million copies worldwide as of December 31, 2008, becoming the best-selling game in the Battle Network series.
