= Mega Man Battle Network 5 =

- North American Mega Man Battle Network 5: Double Team DS box art
- Developer: Capcom Production Studio 2
- Publisher: Capcom
- Director: Masahiro Yasuma
- Producer: Keiji Inafune
- Designers: Masahiro Yasuma; Kohei Ozaki; Teruhiro Shimogawa
- Artists: Yuji Ishihara; Tokiko Nakashima; Hayato Kaji
- Writers: Masakazu Eguchi; Tsukasa Takenaka
- Composers: Akari Kaida (GBA); Mitsuhiko Takano (DS)
- Series: Mega Man Battle Network
- Platforms: Game Boy Advance, Nintendo DS
- Release: Game Boy Advance: JP: December 9, 2004; EU: June 10, 2005; NA: June 21, 2005; Nintendo DS: JP: July 21, 2005; NA: November 1, 2005; EU: April 14, 2006 (Note: Although some sources lists its European release as April 14, other websites indicate certain regions got it on April 13.); AU: April 12, 2007
- Genre: Real-time tactical role-playing
- Modes: Single-player, multiplayer

Mega Man Battle Network 5: Team ProtoMan (Note: Japanese: ロックマンエグゼ５チーム オブ ブルース, Hepburn: Rokkuman Eguze 5 Chīmu Obu Burūsu; lit. 'Rockman.EXE 5: Team of Blues') and Mega Man Battle Network 5: Team Colonel (Note: Japanese: ロックマンエグゼ５チーム オブ カーネル, Hepburn: Rokkuman Eguze 5 Chīmu Obu Kāneru; lit. 'Rockman.EXE 5: Team of Colonel') are 2004 tactical role-playing games developed and published by Capcom for the Game Boy Advance (GBA) handheld game console. Combined, they make up the fifth mainline installment in the Mega Man Battle Network series, and follows Lan Hikari and his NetNavi MegaMan.EXE as they attempt to take down Nebula once again, who have kidnapped Lan's father Yuichiro Hikari and taken over the internet, with an anti-Nebula task force.

Development on the game started during the localization of Battle Network 4, and alongside the development of 4.5: Real Operation. It was announced in CoroCoro Comics in August 2004, with both versions releasing simultaneously in December 2004 in Japan and in June 2005 in Western territories. Battle Network 5 retains the same gameplay as its predecessor, but with the addition of "Liberation Missions" where the player must liberate squares with limited time to defeat the boss. The game also includes crossover content with the Boktai series by Konami.

Mega Man Battle Network 5 received a generally tepid reception from critics, with many finding it too similar to previous entries, and criticizing the aging presentation; in mid-2005, both versions were combined and re-released for the Nintendo DS as Mega Man Battle Network 5: Double Team DS (Note: Japanese: ロックマン エグゼ５ＤＳ ツインリーダーズ, Hepburn: Rokkuman Eguze 5 DS Tsuin Rīdāzu; lit. 'Rockman.EXE 5 DS: Twin Leaders'), which has updated sound and additional content not found in the GBA versions. The GBA versions were re-released through the Wii U Virtual Console in 2015, and as part of the Mega Man Battle Network Legacy Collection compilation in 2023. It was followed up by Mega Man Battle Network 6 in 2005, which acted as the finale of the series.

== Gameplay ==
MegaMan.EXE battles viruses in Double Team DS.

The gameplay of Mega Man Battle Network 5 is largely similar to that of its predecessors. The player explores the real world through Lan Hikari and the Net through MegaMan.EXE. When Lan plugs his PET, a handheld computer, into a computer with an interface jack, he can upload MegaMan.EXE to the cyber network, allowing him to explore and fight viruses as random encounters.

When MegaMan.EXE encounters viruses, the screen shifts to a battle screen set on a six by three square grid. On the left half of the grid is MegaMan.EXE, and on the other half are his opponents. MegaMan.EXE has a relatively weak arm cannon, the Mega Buster, but his main weapon is Lan's library of battle chips, one-use-per-battle special attacks which grant various abilities, including simple attacks, attack enhancements, defensive effects, terrain transmogrification, or assistance from other NetNavis. Before battle, the player can construct a folder consisted of thirty battle chips, and each turn of a battle (measured by a timer bar at the top of the screen), the player is presented with a random selection of these chips. The player can send MegaMan.EXE up to five battle chips, after which the battle takes place in real time, with MegaMan.EXE, controlled by the player, attacking with his Mega Buster, dodging attacks, or activating battle chips from his queue.

MegaMan.EXE joins a team led by either Lan's and MegaMan.EXE's rivals Chaud and ProtoMan.EXE or new characters Baryl and Colonel.EXE, and the members of this team assist MegaMan in various ways. MegaMan.EXE can take on the attributes of one of his teammates with a Soul Unison. The team plays its largest role in Liberation Missions, wherein MegaMan.EXE and the rest of his team enter a part of the Nebula-controlled Internet to free the area via a time-limited battle with a group of viruses. The Dark Chip system from the previous game was also reworked, with them now having to be obtained; it is also possible to use them to activate a "Chaos Unison", which resembles a normal Soul Unison with the main difference being that the Mega Buster is replaced with the effects of the Dark Chip he used for the Chaos Unison. While using this effect doesn't cause HP loss, it has to be done with careful timing, as charging with poor timing will end the Chaos Unison and cause an invincible, evil version of MegaMan.EXE to join the viruses and attack him for a short period of time using random battle chips.

Much like previous games in the series, Game Boy Advance copies of Mega Man Battle Network 5 can connect using the Game Boy Advance link cable to battle head-to-head or to trade battle chips. Battle Network 5 also includes content referencing the Boktai series by Konami, such as a crossover battle feature unlocked by combining both Battle Network 5 and Boktai 2: Solar Boy Django.

== Plot ==
Lan explores an abandoned mine in Team ProtoMan.

The main protagonists Lan Hikari, MegaMan.EXE, and their friends are called to the SciLab headquarters at the request of Lan's father, Yuichiro Hikari. While at SciLab, mysterious agents invade, subduing everyone with sleeping gas, kidnapping Yuichiro, and stealing the friends' PETs and NetNavis. The agents turn out to work for Dr. Regal and his crime syndicate Nebula, which has survived from the fall after being defeated in Mega Man Battle Network 4. Nebula subsequently takes over the Net with an army of viruses and Darkloids: powerful Navis that use DarkChips.

While investigating another disturbance at SciLab, Lan meets either Chaud (in Team ProtoMan) or newcomer Baryl (in Team Colonel), who recruit him to begin forming an elite team of NetNavis to liberate the Net from Nebula's control. In a series of almost identical scenarios between games, Lan meets other powerful NetNavi operators and recruits them. Through the team's efforts, the Net is liberated and peace is restored. However, the occupation of the Net is revealed to be a diversion by Nebula while searching for "The Hikari Report," a research project by Lan's late grandfather, Tadashi Hikari.

The Hikari Report is explained as a research project by Dr. Hikari and Dr. Wily to create SoulNet, a network connecting the minds and souls of humans and NetNavis across the world. The two believed that SoulNet could bring peace and unity to the world, but were unable to finish their research. Upon obtaining the report and completing SoulNet, Regal intends to unleash Nebula Grey, a program of pure hatred and darkness, upon it, corrupting all humans and NetNavis in the world and the Net. Lan and MegaMan also discover that Regal is Dr. Wily's son.

The liberation team storms Nebula's base and confronts Regal in the SoulNet server room. After defeating Nebula Grey, MegaMan destroys all the Dark Power and the room begins to self-destruct. While the heroes evacuate, Yuichiro stays behind to speak to Regal about their fathers' research while a mysterious voice causes the SoulServer to overload. In Team ProtoMan the speaker is unseen, while in Team Colonel it is revealed to be Dr. Wily, who also commands Baryl to rescue Regal and Yuichiro. Because of the SoulServer overload, Regal has many of his memories erased by Dr. Wily and is now a peaceful scientist. With their NetNavis back, Lan and MegaMan joins their friends on the Net.

== Development and release ==
Development of the game started during the localization of Mega Man Battle Network 4, and during the development of Rockman.EXE 4.5: Real Operation (2004). The developers described this period at Capcom as a difficult time. The game was first advertised in the Japanese magazine CoroCoro Comics in August 2004.

Both versions of Battle Network 5 were released in Japan on December 9, 2004. Viewers of the anime film Rockman.EXE the Movie: Program of Light and Darkness would also receive a special copy of Team Colonel with an e-Reader card for the transformation "BassCross MegaMan". Both versions of Battle Network 5 were later released simultaneously on June 10, 2005, in Europe, and June 21, 2005, in North America.

The Game Boy Advance versions were re-released onto the Wii U Virtual Console in Japan on September 9, 2015, and in North America on December 12, 2015. The games are also included in the Mega Man Battle Network Legacy Collection for PlayStation 4, Nintendo Switch and PC via Steam, released in 2023.

=== Double Team DS ===
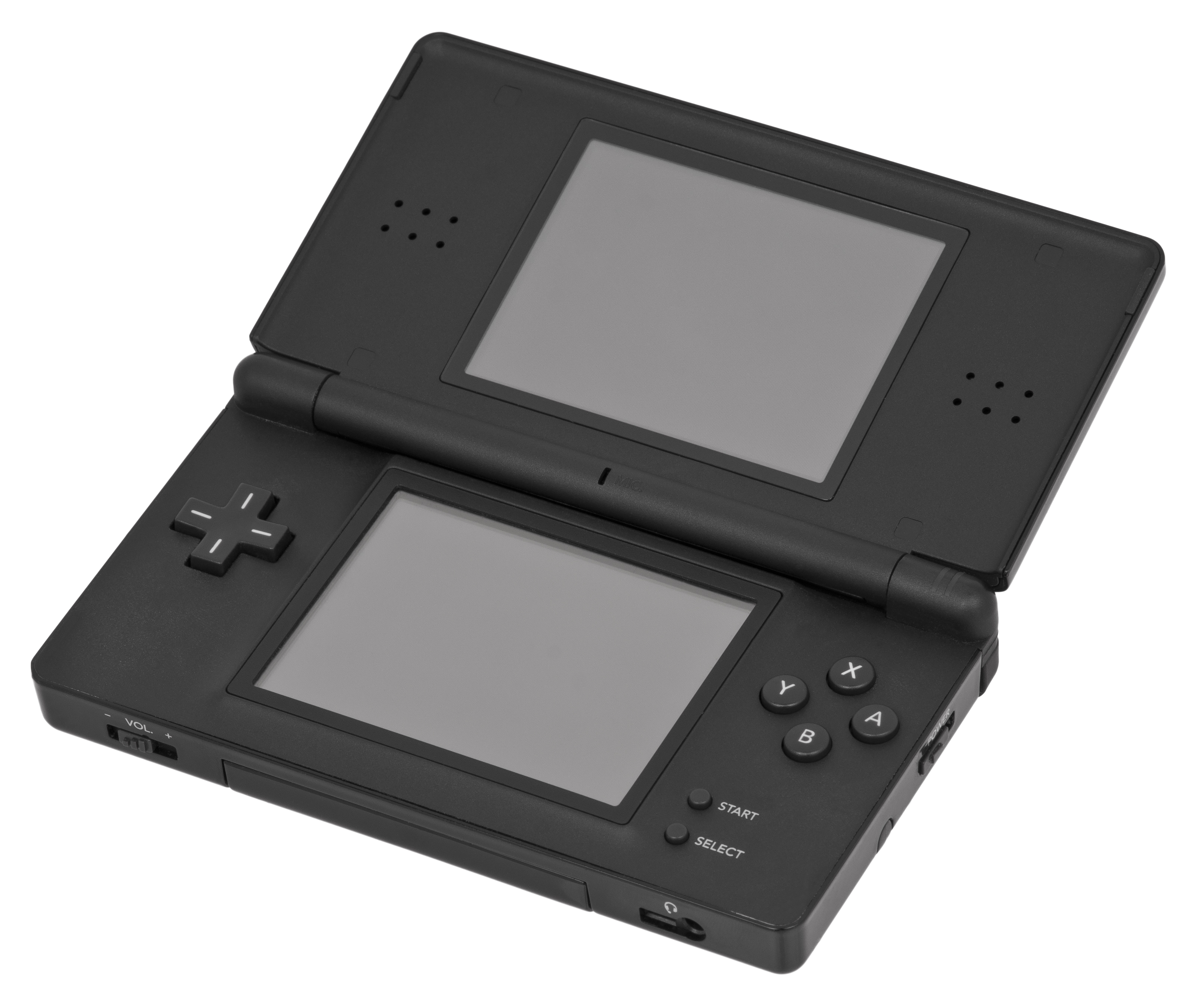
The updated version, titled Mega Man Battle Network 5: Double Team DS released for the Nintendo DS console.

In May 2005, it was officially announced that both games would be coming to the Nintendo DS as Mega Man Battle Network 5: Double Team DS, although its existence was previously hinted at when Nintendo Power added an untitled Battle Network game to its release schedule. It was released in Japan on July 21, 2005, and in North America on November 1, 2005. Its European release was announced on February 7, 2006, and released there on April 13 of the same year, while its Australian release was delayed to April 2007.

The port was led by main planner and writer Tsukana Takenaka, who stated that the port was requested by the producer with the initial goal of combining both GBA versions into one game, and including an opening movie. The DS version was also handled by 14 other people. The DS version added additional content, including a new transformation for MegaMan called SolCross, unlocked by putting a copy of Boktai 2 into the GBA cartridge slot, (Note: In the Japanese version, this requires Shin Bokura no Taiyō: Gyakushū no Sabata, which didn't release for Western territories.) and being able to swap between Navis during fights.

The developers had also experimented with fully 3D graphics early on, as 3D models of several areas and characters were found within the data of Mega Man Star Force, although Christian Svennson, who served as Capcom's Vice President of Strategic Planning & Business Development, theorized in 2009 that the assets may have been made as a test of the DS' capabilities.

== Reception ==
Reception

Aggregate scores
Aggregator	Score
GameRankings	69% (ProtoMan); 66% (Colonel); 70% (Double Team)
Metacritic	67/100 (ProtoMan); 66/100 (Colonel); 68/100 (Double Team)

Review scores
Publication	Score
Eurogamer	6/10 (DS)
Famitsu	36/40 (GBA); 31/40 (DS)
Game Informer	7/10 (GBA); 7.8/10 (DS)
GameSpot	7.1/10 (GBA); 7.5/10 (DS)
GameSpy	3.5/5 (GBA); 3.5/5 (DS)
IGN	6.5/10 (GBA); 6.5/10 (DS)
Nintendo Power	6.5/10 (GBA); 7/10 (DS)

=== Sales ===
Mega Man Battle Network 5: Team ProtoMan was the 48th best-selling game in Japan in 2004 at 255,061 copies. This version was also the 55th best-selling game in the country in 2005 at 211,099 copies. Mega Man Battle Network 5: Team Colonel placed at number 65 with 194,472 copies sold that year. Mega Man Battle Network 5: Double Team DS was the 52nd best-selling Nintendo DS game in Japan in 2005 at 106,526 copies.

In North America, Team ProtoMan was the tenth best-selling handheld game in July 2005.

=== Critical response ===
In North America, both the Game Boy Advance and Nintendo DS versions of Mega Man Battle Network 5 met with fairly tepid critical reception, with Metacritic and GameRankings aggregate scores ranging from 66% to 70% across the different versions. Reviewers often highlighted the reuse of aging art and sound assets from previous games, comparing them unfavorably with contemporary Game Boy Advance games, as well as the lack of changes from its predecessors. Craig Harris said in his review for IGN: "Even though this sequel can be considered "the best in the series so far," Battle Network 5 doesn't add all that much to the series."

The Liberation Missions were also poorly received by reviews, with the general consensus being that they only slowed down the game; GameSpy wrote that "Perhaps if the concept was fleshed out in a spin-off title, the experience would feel more complete than the "Final Fantasy Tactics for Dummies" vibe that it has now." Reviewers praised the DS version for including both games, as well as a new map system, but felt that it hadn't utilize the system's features to their full extent.

Reviews weren't entirely unfavorable, especially when the topic of Battle Network 5's predecessor was concerned. GameSpot, in particular, compared it favorably with Battle Network 4. Japanese reviews were also more positive, with Famitsu scoring the GBA and DS versions 36/40 and 31/40 respectively.
