= Mega Man Battle Network 2 =

2001 video game

- North American cover art
- Developer: Capcom Production Studio 2
- Publishers: JP/NA: Capcom; EU: Ubi Soft
- Producer: Keiji Inafune
- Designer: Masahiro Yasuma
- Programmers: Koetsu Matsuda; Hidekazu Shingaki; Michinori Kataoka; Mitsunori Sakano
- Artists: Yuji Ishihara; Hayato Kaji
- Writers: Shin Kurosawa; Masakazu Eguchi
- Composer: Yoshino Aoki
- Series: Mega Man Battle Network
- Platform: Game Boy Advance
- Release: JP: December 14, 2001; NA: June 11, 2002; PAL: October 18, 2002
- Genre: Real-time tactical role-playing
- Modes: Single-player, multiplayer

Mega Man Battle Network 2 (Note: Japanese: バトルネットワーク ロックマンエグゼ2, Hepburn: Batoru Nettowāku Rokkuman Eguze 2; lit. 'Battle Network Rockman.EXE 2') is a 2001 tactical role-playing game developed by Capcom for the Game Boy Advance (GBA) handheld game console. It is the second game in the Mega Man Battle Network series, and a sequel to the first game; (Note: Retroactively, the game is also considered a sequel to Mega Man Network Transmission (2003).) it follows Lan Hikari and his NetNavi, MegaMan.EXE, as they attempt to take down the new NetCrime syndicate Gospel.

Mega Man Battle Network 2 received generally positive reviews, with many praising it for improving upon the gameplay of the first entry; it has been re-released multiple times, including via the Wii U Virtual Console in 2014, and as part of the Mega Man Battle Network Legacy Collection compilation in 2023. It was followed up by Mega Man Battle Network 3 in 2002.

== Gameplay ==
The general gameplay is essentially identical to that of the original Mega Man Battle Network game; indeed, the two games utilize a significant amount of the same graphics. However, Battle Network 2 introduces several new concepts that augment the system established by the original game.

In terms of health, MegaMan.EXE no longer heals fully and automatically after each battle. Furthermore, the game introduces the SubChip, a device similar in basic concept to a Battle Chip but one that can only be activated outside of battle.

In the original game, a player had only one Battle Chip folder, whereas Battle Network 2 introduces the possibility of alternate active folders, allowing players to easily customize their range of possible attacks to conform to multiple situations. Notably, Chips used in one active folder are not available for the construction of a second, even though only one folder may be used at any given time. Up to three folders can be found in this game, and all are fully customizable. As in the previous game, folders may have up to five Navi Chips each and only five of the same kind of any Chip (the first game allowed up to ten of the same non-Navi Chip).

Aside from the addition of new Battle Chips in general, Battle Network 2 expanded the old Chip code system, which had previously been limited only to the alphabet. Some Chips could occur with an asterisk (*) as their code letter, a wild card symbol meaning the Chip can be used with any other Chip. This game is the only Battle Network game (besides Mega Man Battle Network 6) where it is possible (from one Chip trader only) to get * coded Navi Chips. There are now 250 Battle Chips possible in single player mode, with chips 251-260 possible only via NetBattling, and chip #261 (Sanctuary) earned when the player completes Hard Mode. Players can also now earn up to five stars on the title screen by completing major tasks in the game.

Additionally, players may access NetSquares in the game. These places serve as a sort of Town Square for NetNavis and their operators to relax, buy supplies, and exchange information.

One final change was the replacement of the old armor system, which only affected damage received, with a style system that affects damage received, attack damage, physical appearance, among other benefits. During the course of the game, MegaMan may take on one of five Styles (Guts, Team, Custom, Shield, and Hub), each of which will also be aligned with one of four elements (Heat, Wood, Elec, and Aqua). He can store up to two styles in his memory at once and change out when not battling.

Starting with Battle Network 2, anytime a Chip trader is used, the game will automatically save when the player receives their new Chip. This is to prevent the player from cheating by simply soft resetting without saving until the Chip trader gives out a desirable Chip, which was possible in the first game. Another Chip trader tradition that starts with this game (and continues on for the remainder of the series) is that there is one ten Chip trader that will appear only upon completing Story Mode (yellow star), and gives out the best Chips of all the Chip traders.

== Plot ==
Three months following the events of the first game, and two months following the events of Mega Man Network Transmission, the world is in a time of peace following the defeat of the organization known as WWW (World Three). However, NetCrime, perpetrated by a new NetMafia organization known as Gospel, is on the rise. Once again, Lan Hikari and his digital NetNavi, MegaMan.EXE, become involved and work to defeat Gospel's plot to destroy society.

NetNavi Operators are given the chance to become City NetBattlers, a lesser form of an Official NetBattler, which Lan does, allowing him to travel around the world, both in cyberspace and in real life. In doing so, Lan stops Gospel's attempts to collect four particularly powerful computer programs, called SuperPrograms, on numerous occasions. However, Gospel is eventually successful and uses these programs, in combination with computer bugs, to construct a SuperNavi of immense power. This Navi is a duplication of Bass.EXE, who appeared in the original game as a hidden boss and who plays a larger role in later games. However, after fighting MegaMan, the Bass copy destabilizes and transforms into a gigantic, wolf-shaped super multibug organism.

The energy needed to create this Navi causes unusual radiation, blending the Net and the real world together. This radiation eventually paralyzes Lan, effectively making him incapable of operating MegaMan; however the latter puts the two into Full-Synchro so that Lan may control MegaMan by thought and emotion, similar in concept to the final confrontation of the original game. During the final battle, it is revealed that the leader of Gospel is Sean Obihiro, a child who felt neglected by and resentful of society after his parents died in a plane crash. After defeating the Multibug Organism, Lan promises to be the boy's friend after he has paid for his crimes. After the credits, the real Bass is seen destroying copies of himself, and shows anger toward the human that made them. He swears to exact his revenge on the humans and then disappears.

== Development and release ==
Development on Mega Man Battle Network 2 started shortly after completion of the first game; programmer Koetsu Matsuda stated that when making the first game, there were several things the development staff had wanted to do different, but couldn't due to time constraints, specifically citing the escape system. The game was first announced at the Japan World Hobby Fair in June 2001, prior to the release of the first game in international territories; during the event, Capcom held a contest to design a boss character for the game, similar to previous games in the Mega Man franchise. The winner was eventually announced to be Shoichiro Satokawa, and his character GateMan.EXE.

The game was officially released in Japan on December 14, 2001; Japanese television advertisements for the game featured the song "feel the wind" by Janne Da Arc; the Japanese version came with a bug that would cause the save data to corrupt if the LockEnemy Sub Chip was used, which was acknowledged on Capcom's official website. It was later released in North America on June 11, 2002, while Ubisoft would publish the game in Europe on October 18, 2002.

The game was re-released for the Wii U Virtual Console in Japan on November 12, 2014, and in North America on January 8, 2015. Due to the Virtual Console not emulating the Link Feature, accessing the multiplayer menu will give the player all multiplayer and event-exclusive chips. In 2023, the game was included in the Mega Man Battle Network Legacy Collection compilation for PlayStation 4, Nintendo Switch, and PC via Steam.

== Reception ==
Reception

Aggregate scores
Aggregator	Score
GameRankings	81.40%
Metacritic	81/100

Review scores
Publication	Score
Electronic Gaming Monthly	7.5/10
Famitsu	35/40
Game Informer	8.8/10
GamePro	3.5/5
GameSpot	8.5/10
GameSpy	3/5
GameZone	8.6/10
IGN	8.5/10

Mega Man Battle Network 2 sold 124,349 units in Japan during 2001 and has been listed by Dengeki Online as the 91st best-selling video game in the region for that year. Famitsu sales data showed that the game was the 30th best-selling game of 2002 with a total of 344,230 units sold by the end of year. The magazine showed a total of 446,938 units sold in the country at that point.

Battle Network 2 was a runner-up for GameSpot's annual "Best Role-Playing Game on Game Boy Advance" award, which went to Tactics Ogre: The Knight of Lodis.
