= Mega Man Star Force Legacy Collection =

- Developer: Capcom
- Publisher: Capcom
- Director: Koji Oda
- Producers: Shingo Izumi; So Asada
- Designer: Yusuke Tokita
- Programmer: Naoki Kusumoto
- Artist: Yusuke Yamamoto
- Composers: Hana Kimura; Shigeyuki Kameda; Yuna Hiranuma
- Series: Mega Man Star Force
- Engine: RE Engine
- Platforms: Nintendo Switch; PlayStation 4; PlayStation 5; Windows; Xbox One; Xbox Series X/S
- Release: WW: March 27, 2026
- Genre: Action role-playing
- Modes: Single-player, Multiplayer

Mega Man Star Force Legacy Collection (Note: Japanese: 流星のロックマン パーフェクトコレクション, Hepburn: Ryūsei no Rokkuman Pāfekuto Korekushon; lit. Shooting Star Rockman Perfect Collection) is a video game compilation based on Capcom's Mega Man series. It compiles the Mega Man Star Force trilogy, originally released for the Nintendo DS between 2006 and 2008. Like other Mega Man Legacy Collection entries, it also includes various enhancements and behind-the-scenes materials. The compilation was released on March 27, 2026, on Nintendo Switch, PlayStation 4, PlayStation 5, Windows, Xbox One, and Xbox Series X/S.

== Overview ==
Star Force Legacy Collection contains all three entries in the Mega Man Star Force series: Mega Man Star Force (Note: Includes Pegasus, Leo, and Dragon versions) (2006), Mega Man Star Force 2 (Note: Includes Zerker × Ninja and Zerker × Saurian versions) (2007), and Mega Man Star Force 3 (Note: Includes Black Ace and Red Joker versions) (2008). Each of the games were originally released in multiple versions, all of which are included in the collection for a total of seven games. The Star Force games' original dual-screen format has been adapted for single-screen gameplay, with the game transitioning between the two displays automatically at predetermined moments or manually by pressing a button. Players are able to adjust the screen layout and toggle a smoothing filter.

New difficulty and assist options have been added to aid players, such as an auto-save function, adjustable enemy encounter rates, and the ability to multiply Mega Man's defense and damage output. Players can trade cards online and battle one another in ranked or casual matches, though cross-platform play is not supported. Up to 100 players per game can be registered to an in-game friends list, based on the series' "Brother Band" system. In addition, players can access "bonus cards" which could only be obtained through special means in the original games, such as events and toys. This includes crossover content based on Konami's Lunar Knights, which was previously omitted from the English release of the first Star Force game.

Bonus features include an art gallery and a music player.. Players can toggle between the games' original soundtracks and new re-arrangements of every track, enabling them in gameplay or listening to them in the music player. The collection adds new voiceovers to each game in Japanese and English, with the cast of the anime series reprising their roles. Like Battle Network Legacy Collection, Star Force Mega Man appears as an interactive navigator character on the main menu.

== Release ==
Capcom first announced Star Force Legacy Collection on September 12, 2025, during a Japanese Nintendo Direct broadcast. The collection was released on March 27, 2026, for Nintendo Switch, PlayStation 4, Xbox One, Windows, PlayStation 5 and Xbox Series X/S, making it the first Legacy Collection to be ported to the latter two consoles. To promote the collection, Capcom briefly re-released the Mega Man Star Force anime through their video streaming channels.

Players who pre-ordered the game received free downloadable content (DLC) that adds four additional music arrangements to the music player, as well as Geo Stelar and Omega-Xis as alternate menu navigators; the pack was later released for general purchase on June 26. Additional paid DLC that adds Sonia Strumm and Luna Platz as navigators was made available at launch. A free DLC pack was released on April 23, which adds 43 music tracks from the Mega Man Battle Network series to the music player.

== Reception ==
Reception

Aggregate scores
| Aggregator | Score |
|---|---|
| Metacritic | (NS) 79/100 (PC) 77/100 (PS5) 75/100 |
| OpenCritic | 70% recommend |

Review scores
| Publication | Score |
|---|---|
| Hardcore Gamer | 4.5/5 |
| IGN | 8/10 |
| Nintendo Life | 8/10 |
| Nintendo World Report | 7/10 |
| Push Square | 7/10 |
| RPGFan | 50/100 |

Mega Man Star Force Legacy Collection received "generally favorable" reviews according to review aggregator website Metacritic. Fellow review aggregator OpenCritic assessed that the game received strong approval, being recommended by 70% of critics.
