= Mega Man Network Transmission =

2003 video game

- North American cover art
- Developer: Arika
- Publisher: Capcom
- Director: Akira Kurabayashi
- Producers: Keiji Inafune; Ichiro Mihara
- Designer: Hiroshi Okuda
- Artist: Motokazu Sakai
- Composers: Shinji Hosoe; Ayako Saso; Yousuke Yasui
- Series: Mega Man Battle Network
- Platform: GameCube
- Release: JP: March 6, 2003; NA: June 17, 2003; PAL: June 27, 2003
- Genres: Action role-playing, platform
- Mode: Single-player

Mega Man Network Transmission (Note: Japanese: ロックマン エグゼ トランスミッション, Hepburn: Rokkuman Eguze Toransumisshon; lit. 'Rockman.EXE: Transmission') is a 2003 action-platform video game developed by Arika and published by Capcom for the GameCube video game console. The game was first released in Japan on March 6, 2003, and in North America and PAL regions the following June as Arika's only GameCube game. Network Transmission is part of the Mega Man Battle Network series, which originated on the Game Boy Advance (GBA) handheld game console and takes place in an alternate timeline to the main Mega Man series.

Taking place one month after the events of the first Mega Man Battle Network game, the plot follows the human protagonist Lan Hikari and his online avatar MegaMan.EXE in their fight against the "WWW (World Three)" organization and its attempt to unleash and spread the infectious "Zero Virus" into cyberspace. The player controls MegaMan through a set of levels that require actions such as jumping, sliding, and shooting, as well as the use of special "Battle Chips" that grant the player various combat and movement abilities. Network Transmission combines action and platforming gameplay elements from previous Mega Man games with the strategy and role-playing elements defined by the Battle Network series.

The development team's intent was to meld these attributes into a home console title that would appeal to the young gamer audience that they found with the GBA series. Critical reception for Network Transmission has been mostly average reviews. Although it received some positive remarks for its Battle Chip gameplay, many critics have complained that the game features a high or unbalanced difficulty level. The game's sound and its combination of 2D and 3D cel-shaded graphics have been met with varied opinions.

== Gameplay ==
The player selects and uses a LongSwrd Battle Chip from the HUD at the bottom of the screen. The Custom Bar extends across the top.

Mega Man Network Transmission incorporates aspects of action and platforming games similar to other Mega Man series, while retaining the strategy and role-playing elements of the Battle Network series. The player takes control of the protagonist Lan within the game's real world and his NetNavi MegaMan.EXE within its Internet world. Unlike previous games in this series, Lan is restricted from moving location to location. Instead, the player uses a map screen with points of interest to travel to different levels. Levels are opened up as the player progresses through the game, with a slight emphasis on linear progression, although MegaMan can move off-path at times. Levels typically end in a boss battle with another NetNavi. Combat takes place in real-time, with MegaMan given the ability to jump, slide, fire his Mega Buster arm cannon, and dodge enemy attacks on a two-dimensional plane.

Special abilities called "Battle Chips" are provided through a "Custom Bar" that slowly fills at the top of the screen. When the bar is full, the player can select up to five Battle Chips, which are provided from a folder of player-selected chips. Ten random chips are available when the bar is full; a total of twenty can be used for each level excursion. Battle Chips are used for dealing large amounts of damage to enemies, protecting and restoring MegaMan's health, summoning other Navi's to MegaMan's aid, and for some platforming abilities. Certain chips can even be combined to be more effective. Although Battle Chips are limited in quantity, they can be picked up from deleted enemies or can be purchased at shops when not exploring the Internet. As in previous Battle Network games, items that upgrade MegaMan's maximum health, firing power, and other attributes can also be accessed.

== Plot ==
The storyline of Mega Man Network Transmission takes place during the first decade of the 21st century ("200X"), one month after the original Mega Man Battle Network. Following the defeat of the "Life Virus", the ultimate weapon of Dr. Wily and the "WWW (World Three)" criminal organization, Lan Hikari and his network navigator (NetNavi) MegaMan.EXE return to a life of ease. However, not long after Lan begins to relax, he soon learns of a mysterious and destructive computer virus called the "Zero Virus" that infects Navis and causes mayhem via his "PErsonal information Terminal (PET)" email. Lan has other qualms to deal with however, as he receives an email which reveals that fellow NetNavi Roll.EXE is trapped in the Internet. MegaMan goes to save her, finding an infected FireMan.EXE as the cause of trouble. Defeating him, the duo talk to FireMan's operator and former member of the WWW, Mr. Match, and learn that the vaccine being distributed to amend the Zero Virus is actually doing just the opposite, having caused FireMan to go berserk.

Confirming this with Lan's father, Dr. Yuichiro Hikari, the two set out to search for the cure of the problem, finding many situations of pragmatic Navis infected and causing mayhem. Stopping all of them and returning them to their respective operators, the two eventually discover more clues leading to the remnants of the WWW. It is revealed that a powerful Navi called StarMan.EXE has been distributing the virus. After defeating StarMan, Lan and MegaMan engage in a climactic battle against the powerful super virus Zero himself. However, at the conclusion of the battle, just as the finishing blow is about to be delivered to Zero, the heroes discover he is not evil. Yuichiro then transforms him into a full-fledged Navi. However, their happiness is short-lived as a former member of the WWW, simply called "Professor", reveals this was all part of his scheme to revive the dreaded Life Virus. Analyzing clues, Lan and MegaMan engage and defeat the newly upgraded Life Virus R and use Zero's observation powers to eventually bring the Professor to justice. There is dialogue at the end of the game between ShadowMan.EXE and his operator Mr. Dark, leading the plot into the next chronological installment, Mega Man Battle Network 2.

== Development ==
Mega Man Network Transmission was developed by Arika, who had previously worked on the Street Fighter EX series, a 3D-rendered, polygon-based rendition of publisher Capcom's traditionally 2D fighting series. Producer Keiji Inafune revealed in an interview with Dengeki that after a string of PlayStation releases, the team chose to focus their development efforts of the Mega Man franchise for Nintendo consoles with the Battle Network series. They felt that children who played the GBA handheld were beginning to show interest in the GameCube, and that the character was more suitable to a console related to the Nintendo Family Computer (Famicom), where the franchise originated. Inafune stated that the developer wanted to "preserve the core of Rockman" by transcending the traditional action elements (i.e. running and jumping) for the current gaming hardware from the perspective of the role-playing series.

Network Transmission uses a cel-shaded animation style to match the MegaMan NT Warrior anime series that was airing in Japan during the game's development. Inafune explained that the team opted for an anime style with "eye-catching effects" in place of a more realistic look because he felt it the former would be more enjoyable. Yuji Ishihara, the primary character artist for the Battle Network series, used many of his previous character designs for Network Transmission. One new contribution was updating his illustration for the revived Life Virus by giving it two fists per arm, among other details. "I thought it would be both an effective look," Ishihara elaborated, "as well as make for a reasonably mobile character for a polygon-based action game." The musical score for Network Transmission was co-composed by Shinji Hosoe, Ayako Saso, and Yousuke Yasui. Hosoe's company Super Sweep Records has recently been given the rights to produce the soundtrack, and it was released as a part of Mega Man's 25th anniversary on November 2, 2012.

Network Transmission was announced and on display for the first time at the Tokyo Game Show in September 2002. The game was showcased at the Mega Man series' 15th anniversary celebration event at the Makuhari Messe in Chiba Prefecture that December. A playable version made appearances in January 2003 at the World Hobby Fair in Osaka and at the Capcom Gamer's Day event in Las Vegas. Finally, the game was displayed at the Electronic Entertainment Expo in Los Angeles during the summer between its Japanese and North American releases.

Mega Man Network Transmission is the only Arika game released for the GameCube, as the company did not develop any further games for that console.

== Reception ==
Reception

Aggregate scores
Aggregator	Score
GameRankings	66.12%
Metacritic	65/100

Review scores
Publication	Score
Electronic Gaming Monthly	6/10
Eurogamer	6/10
Famitsu	28/40
G4	2/5
GamePro	3.5/5
GameSpot	6.7/10
GameSpy	4/5
IGN	6.7/10
Nintendo Power	7.2/10

Media Create sales data for Japan shows that Mega Man Network Transmission sold 23,147 copies during its first week on sale, 9,041 copies during its second week, 7,859 copies during its third week, and 4,679 copies during its fifth week. A total of 79,360 copies were sold in the country by the end of 2003. A bargain-priced version of the game was released in Japan on March 18, 2004. According to NPD Group, Network Transmission sold 30,224 copies in North America, making it the eighth best-selling GameCube game in the region for the month of June 2003.

Mega Man Network Transmission has been met with mixed critical reception. The game currently holds scores of 67% on GameRankings and 65 out of 100 on Metacritic. A point of contention for many critics was the game's difficulty level. Skyler Miller of G4 summarized, "Network Transmission is painfully difficult not because of any genuine challenge, but because of its cheap enemies, frustrating weapons setup, and unnecessary complications. For example, you can only save after beating a boss, which is common in the Mega Man series. It's tedious to have to wade your way through the relatively straightforward levels time and time again only to meet instant death against a boss." GameSpy's Benjamin Turner felt that the difficulty level was unbalanced rather than too steep, and that once a player gains a foothold on the gameplay and collects enough Battle Chips and power-ups, the challenge subsides. Reviewers for Eurogamer, IGN, and GameSpot all similarly agreed that the greatest difficulty is presented toward the game's start, particularly with its first few boss battles.

Opinions on the visuals and audio in Network Transmission have been decidedly split. Turner found the music perfectly fitting, but stated, "You may also be disappointed that the graphics don't quite push the GameCube. They're generally okay, and even pretty a few times, but overall the visuals are a bit spartan." Jeff Gerstmann of GameSpot described the backgrounds and animation as appropriate, that the Japanese voice acting matched the characters, and that the music was upbeat. However, he found the art style lacking in personality, the weapon effects and summons "understated", and the sound effects "underdeveloped". IGN's Matt Casamassina was conversely impressed by the art style, backgrounds, and frame rate, but disliked the graphics as a whole, proclaiming, "It's a brand new product, but it looks like it could have been released on PlayStation 1, or perhaps even on Super Nintendo." Miller found the game's use of cel-shading useless and the titular protagonist "the weakest link of all, looking undefined, vague, and more than a little awkward".

The game's integration of Battle Chips into the side-scroller genre was admired by some reviewers. Casamassina was entertained by discovering and capitalizing on which chips are useful against which enemies. Turner was impressed by the random shuffling of chips in one's inventory and the instances of forced improvisation on the player's part. Tom Bramwell of Eurogamer expressed satisfaction with having the needed chips at the right times, but admitted frustration with having to disarm oneself to organize them. He asserted, "Even glancing at what you might move to the top of the list involves sending the blue bomber's current chips back to the 'Folder', leaving you with a choice between edging forward with the paltry chargeable beam weapon and standing around waiting for your Custom bar to fill up again."
