= Mega Man Star Force 3 =

2008 video game

- North American cover art showing the Black Ace and Red Joker versions.
- Developer: Capcom
- Publisher: Capcom
- Director: Masahiro Yasuma
- Producer: Takeshi Horinouchi
- Artist: Yuji Ishihara
- Writers: Shin Kurosawa; Hiroshi Yamashita; Kosuke Nasu; Shinsuke Kodama
- Composers: Yoshino Aoki; Akari Kaida
- Series: Mega Man Star Force
- Platform: Nintendo DS
- Release: JP: November 13, 2008; NA: June 30, 2009
- Genre: Action role-playing
- Modes: Single-player, multiplayer

Mega Man Star Force 3: Black Ace and Mega Man Star Force 3: Red Joker are 2008 action role-playing games developed and published by Capcom for the Nintendo DS. They are the third and final game in the Mega Man Star Force trilogy. They were released in Japan on November 13, 2008 and in United States on June 30, 2009. The game was released with two versions: Black Ace (ブラックエース) and Red Joker (レッドジョーカー). Each features a unique cover and unique character transformations, among other features. A sequel, Mega Man Star Force 4, was in development from between 2009 and 2010 when it was cancelled due to low sales of this game and Rockman EXE Operate Shooting Star. Both versions of the game were later compiled in Mega Man Star Force Legacy Collection (2026).

== Gameplay ==
=== Exploration ===
The core gameplay of Mega Man Star Force 3 is very similar to its predecessors. The player controls Geo Stelar, a 12-year-old boy now in the sixth-grade who is able to perform an electromagnetic wave change with his AM-ian partner Omega-Xis to transform into Mega Man, an entity able to traverse in both the real and wave worlds. Field gameplay takes place on isometric maps where Geo can interact with his environment and other NPCs. In his human form, he is only able to travel in the physical world, restricted to seeing the wave world through his Visualizer (a special type of eyeglasses). However, by transforming into Mega Man, he can traverse both the real world and wave world. Unlike the previous two games, the player can transform into Mega Man at any time they wish.

Replacing the character's fictional handheld device from the previous game is the Hunter-VG, a sort of personal digital assistant where players can access their Battle Cards, status, emails, and various other features. Hunter-VG's also house artificial intelligent EM wave beings known as Wizards (the spiritual successors to the Net Navis of Mega Man Battle Network).

The Hunter-VG affects gameplay with various pop-up messages that the player has to physically touch on the bottom screen in order to access. For example, when conversing with NPCs, the player can access personal information about them and their Wizards, or by selecting "ACCESS," the player can travel inside of "Cyber Cores" within various electronic devices. Key words such as locations and characters are also stored to give casual players background if they didn't play the previous two games.

By utilizing the bottom screen in this manner, the game helps simulate that the player is actually operating a real Hunter-VG and interacting with a real Wizard. Occasionally, the player is also given a different Wizard temporarily with unique abilities that can affect their environment.

=== Battle system ===
The Custom Screen demonstrating Battle Card selection during battles (Japanese version)

Above the real world are a series of roads consisting of radio waves. By transforming into Mega Man, Geo can run across the wave road where viruses can be battled via random encounters. The game then shifts to a three-dimensional grid, viewed from behind Mega Man. Mega Man is only able to move left or right while his enemies have a wider range of movement in front of him. However, Mega Man is given the ability to shield and temporarily jump into the enemies' side of the battlefield to compensate. HP represents the amount of life Mega Man has. Whenever he is hit by an attack the number decreases, and when it reaches "zero," the game is over. HP can be recovered in a number of ways, both in and out of battle.

The player can always use their standard Mega Buster at any time to combat with, and upgrade items for Omega-Xis can be collected throughout the game to increase the Mega Buster's firing rate, power, and charge speed. The Mega Buster is constantly charging to release a single powerful shot, but the player can hold the button down to fire rapidly.

However, the Mega Buster is fairly weak. Instead, combat revolves around Battle Cards, a library of trading cards that gives Mega Man a variety of unique abilities. Only a certain number of Battle Cards can be placed in the player's folder at a time, and six cards appear randomly every time the player pulls up the Custom Screen. Although cards normally can only be used once per battle, they are all refreshed afterward, so the player is encouraged to use them as the primary means of combat. How many cards can be selected in a hand depends on their placement on the screen and their color.

Battle Cards come in a wide variety such as attack-type, defense-type, cards that enhance other cards, or "dimming" cards. There are three different classes of cards ranked by their power and rarity, and only a certain number of cards from each class, or a certain number of a specific card, can be placed into a folder.

A new feature in Star Force 3 is the placement of cards on the Custom Screen. Occasionally, cards will appear behind others and cannot be selected normally. By selecting these darkened cards, the player can choose to either use that card by itself without the option of pairing with others, or select an alternate use dictated by the element of the card. When selected in this manner, they can be paired with any card, regardless of placement. Another feature is the addition of Galaxy Advances, similar to Program Advances in the Battle Network series. Players choose three cards in a certain order, causing the cards to combine and make a stronger card.

The primary new battle feature in Star Force 3 is the introduction of "Noise" later in the game. Depending on how the player defeats enemies, a Noise percentage will increase—the higher the percentage, the more abilities become available to Mega Man. For example, exceeding 50% will allow Mega Man to access the power of one of 10 unique transformations based on FM-ian foes from previous games. These forms give Mega Man new charged Mega Buster shots, elemental armor, unique super-attacks (activated by successfully countering an enemy attack), and other special attributes.

The player is also given other special rewards for maintaining 100% or more of Noise rating, such as completely random Battle Cards at the end of the battle, and by achieving a 200% or plus Noise rating, access to the Meteor Server is granted. This option becomes available on the Custom Screen, giving Mega Man an exceptionally powerful folder to use for the next three rounds of the battle, as well as transforming into a unique finalized form stronger than any other Noise forms (Black Ace in the Black Ace version and Red Joker in the Red Joker version). The finalized form has no elemental weakness and each form has certain status bonuses that is different from each transformation. However, like the Tribe King form from Star Force 2, both transformations last only for three turns. Additionally, locking-on cards will grant twice the damage upon use. After three turns, Mega Man will revert to his normal form with 0% Noise.

Noise is increased in one of two ways. Against viruses, by defeating them with a non-elemental, non-dimming card that exceeds the remaining HP of the viruses, the "overkill" amount of the attack will contribute to the Noise rating. However, against boss characters, half the attack power of a non-elemental and non-dimming card will contribute to the Noise rating, allowing for much more frantic boss battles thanks to the benefits of Noise. In addition, In a multiplayer vs. match, Noise is gained by adding half of the damage done with a Mega (Lock-on) Attack, and giga cards give 30% Noise and mega cards give 20% Noise as well (regardless of actually damaging the enemy).

Star Force continues the same elemental properties that previous Star Force titles have used. The four elements include: Heat, Aqua, Elec, and Wood. Elements are attached to certain attacks and to enemies' defenses. When an element is hit with an element that it is weak to, double-damage is dealt. Heat is weak against Aqua but strong against Wood, Aqua is weak against Elec but strong against Heat, Elec is weak against Wood but strong against Aqua, and Wood is weak against Heat but strong against Elec. However, in a Person VS. Person match, attacking the other player with an element that they are weak to does not deal double damage. Instead, it makes their Noise go down to 0%, and reverts them back to normal.

=== Other features ===
Like the previous game, Mega Man Star Force 3 is available in two different retail versions: Black Ace and Red Joker. The storyline and events are identical between the two games, and it is not necessary to play through both for the full experience. However, specific Battle Cards and transformations are unique between each version, specifically the finalized forms of Black Ace and Red Joker (as displayed on the box of each version).

Each version has five specific Noise forms that are more easily gained than the other version. For example, the player has a 15% chance of getting Gemini Noise in Black Ace, but only a 3% chance in Red Joker. Likewise, the player has a 15% chance of getting Crown Noise in Red Joker, but only 3% in Black Ace. However, players are able to use the Nintendo Wi-Fi Connection to become "Brothers" with other players. By doing this, they can perform Multi-Noise transformations by combining the player's Noise form with one of their Brothers', creating 100 unique combinations of abilities. The player can also be rewarded by not having any real-world Brothers by being given Rogue Noise, a special transformation that draws power from loneliness. Rogue Noise has a 10% chance of being achieved in both games.

Aside from becoming Brothers with real players around the world, the player is given various in-game Brothership with NPCs that will increase the player's Link Power. Special abilities can be equipped to Mega Man much like the Navi Customizer of Mega Man Battle Network 3, but how many abilities can be equipped at once is dependent on the amount of Link Power the player has.

Returning from Star Force 2, the player is also able to battle with other players through use of Wi-Fi. However, the custom portrait creation from the first two titles has been replaced with a team logo creation function, and Brothers are now represented by their currently-equipped Noise form.

Wave Command Cards from Star Force 2 also make a return in the form of White Cards that are distributed on Capcom's official website. These are physical cards that are printed out and laid atop the bottom screen. The player then taps a sequence of codes indicated on the card to activate them. When activated, the White Cards grant the player a set of 4 special Battle Cards in addition to the 30 already placed in their Folder.

In Japan, the same type of cards were also available as Noise Kaizou and Rezon Cards, which could alter special attributes about Mega Man; however according to Capcom-Unity representative Seth Killian, these cards were not distributed in North America due to licensing issues. Despite this, the official website was updated on July 15 to display Noise Cards and Purpose Cards alongside White Cards, insinuating they may be released in the near future. However, these sections were removed a few days later.

== Plot ==
With the onset of Wizards, humans find themselves at a new level of convenience. However, after further research, scientists have made a startling discovery that Wizards are emitting Noise waves that are causing disruption in the wave world, some Wizards have lost control and gone on rampages due to overexposure to Noise.

A crime syndicate known as Dealer begins manipulating and collecting the Noise for their leader named Mr. King who poses as a charitable businessman for the public eye. Dealer has a playing card motif and uses Noise cards to transform Wizards into powerful EM beings in order to heighten surrounding Noise levels. (For example, a Wizard known as Magnes is given the Spade card to transform into the vicious Spade Magnes) Dealer's true intentions involve manipulating a powerful mass of Noise called Meteor G that is on a crash-course for Earth, and using it to take the world hostage.

Geo Stelar (with Wizard Omega-Xis) find themselves in the middle of various Dealer attacks and begin thwarting their plans as Mega Man. A young Satella Police member named A.C. Eos (A.C.E or simply Ace) takes notice and decides to enlist Geo as a commando in the fight against Dealer, especially since Mega Man is able to utilize Noise positively with Noise Control Program gaved by Ace. Geo's friends Bud Bison (with Wizard Taurus) and teen pop sensation Sonia Strumm (with Wizard Lyra) also join in the struggle against Dealer. Solo, Geo's arch-rival from Star Force 2, also makes a return, this time battling against Dealer for personal reasons, as Dealer is abusing the power of Mu.

After defeating the Kelvin Stelar-infused Crimson Dragon controlled by the Dealer leader Mr. King and destroying Meteor G, Geo returns to Earth, followed by Omega-Xis and Kelvin, 2 weeks after, The Stelar family and Omega-Xis finally happily reunites, as seen in the last picture of the game.

== Reception ==
Reception

Aggregate scores
Aggregator	Score
GameRankings	60% (Black Ace); 62% (Red Joker)
Metacritic	58/100 (Black Ace); 59/100 (Red Joker)

Review scores
Publication	Score
1Up.com	C+
Famitsu	8/10, 8/10, 8/10, 8/10
GameSpot	5.5/10
IGN	6/10
Nintendo Power	6/10

The reviews of Mega Man Star Force 3 have been rather mixed, with most review sites giving it an average, or slightly above rating. Mark Bozon of IGN gave the game 6/10, calling the gameplay strong, but repetitive and essentially the same as the previous games.

=== Sales ===
The Black Ace version of Mega Man Star Force 3 was the 7th best-selling game in Japan during the week ending November 20, 2008, while the Red Joker version charted at number 13 the same week. Combined, the two versions sold 174,426 copies by the end of 2008.
