= Mega Man Battle Network =

- Genre: Real-time tactical role-playing
- Developers: Capcom; Inti Creates; Arika; Tose
- Publisher: Capcom
- Platforms: Game Boy Advance; WonderSwan Color; GameCube; Arcade; Mobile phones Nintendo DS; Wii U PlayStation 4 Nintendo Switch; Windows
- First release: Mega Man Battle Network; March 21, 2001
- Latest release: Mega Man Battle Network Legacy Collection; April 14, 2023
- Parent series: Mega Man

Mega Man Battle Network (Note: Japanese: ロックマンエグゼ, Hepburn: Rokkuman Eguze; lit. 'Rockman.EXE') is a tactical role-playing video game series created by Masahiro Yasuma and developed and published by Capcom as a spin-off of the Mega Man series. First released in 2001 for the Game Boy Advance (GBA) handheld game console, the series takes place in an alternate Mega Man continuity where computers and networking technology became the main focus of scientific advancement, rather than robotics. There are a total of six mainline games (four of which have two different versions), alongside several spin-offs.

Created amidst the success of Nintendo and Game Freak's Pokémon series, alongside the rise of collectible card games, Mega Man Battle Network has players control MegaMan.EXE, a NetNavi operated by Lan Hikari as they attempt to stop the schemes of a net-crime organization called WWW (called "World Three"), headed by the universe's interpretation of Dr. Wily. Players battle enemies on a 6x3 grid, selecting "Battle Chips" which allow for more powerful attacks.

The series has been met with positive reviews from critics, although later games, particularly Mega Man Battle Network 5 and Mega Man Battle Network 6, have been criticized for a perceived lack of innovation; the series was followed-up by a sequel series titled Mega Man Star Force, which is set 200 years after Battle Network and focuses on EM waves. A compilation of all six mainline entries, Mega Man Battle Network Legacy Collection, was released in April 2023 for Nintendo Switch, PlayStation 4, and Windows.

== Plot ==
Mega Man Battle Network is set in an ambiguous year in the 21st century ("20XX AD") in an alternate reality from the original Mega Man series. Within the world of Battle Network, the Net has become humanity's primary means of communication, commerce, and even crime. Users are able to "jack in" to the Net and other computerized devices, and explore their various aspects using digital people called "NetNavis (Network Navigators)" as if they were physical locations. The Net and the inner workings of computers are displayed as a virtual world with which computer programs of all varieties, as personified in a humanoid form, can interact. Users often do so by accessing their NetNavis via a "PET (PErsonal information Terminal)" device.

The plot of Mega Man Battle Network follows one such pair, Lan Hikari and his NetNavi MegaMan.EXE. Lan is a eleven-year-old fifth-grader in the town of ACDC. His father, Dr. Yuichiro Hikari, is one of the world's top scientists and NetNavi researchers. Most of the series (barring spin-offs) involve Lan Hikari and MegaMan.EXE stopping an evil crime syndicate from taking over the world and the Net; "WWW" (said out loud as "World Three") in the first, third, and sixth games, Gospel in the second game, (Note: In Battle Network 3, it is revealed that the head of Gospel, Sean Obihiro, was being manipulated behind the scenes by Dr. Wily.) and Nebula in the fourth and fifth games.

== Characters ==
=== Main ===
==== Lan Hikari and MegaMan.EXE ====
Lan Hikari (光 熱斗, Hikari Netto), is the main human protagonist of the Battle Network series. He is a fifth-grade student who has a strong bond with his fellow NetNavi, the titular character and main protagonist MegaMan.EXE (ロックマン.EXE, Rokkuman.Eguze; Rockman.EXE in Japanese). Lan is the son of Yuichiro Hikari and Haruka Hikari and the grandson of Tadashi Hikari.

Lan is a carefree boy who seeks adventure and fun and can be rash at times, but is also quick to notice small details and think calmly during situations. He frequently NetBattles, and is known to be dense about things unrelated to the Net. Despite his seemingly care-free attitude, Lan is always quick to do the right thing. He is talented on inline skates and commonly decorates his room with soccer-related things.

Lan is voiced by Alex Doduk in earlier parts of the anime's English dub and by Brad Swaile in later parts of the anime's English dub.

MegaMan.EXE is voiced by Andrew Francis in the English dub.

==== Mayl Sakurai and Roll.EXE ====
Mayl Sakurai (桜井 メイル, Sakurai Meiru), known as Maylu Sakurai in the English anime and manga, Lan's classmate and close friend and the operator of Roll.EXE (ロール, Rōru). They are next-door neighbors and often seen as a couple, though Lan is clueless towards her affections.

In Mega Man Battle Network 5, it is revealed in a Visionburst 11 years in the past that Mayl's father is Netopian, making her at least half Netopian.

Mega Man Battle Network 6's post-credits scene reveals that Lan and Mayl eventually married and had a child they named "Patch" ("Raito"). Mayl, being the more mature and intelligent of the two, often beats some sense into Lan when he gets himself into trouble.

She is voiced by Kaori Mizuhashi in the original Japanese version and by Brittney Wilson in the English dub.

Roll.EXE is voiced by Masako Jō in Japanese and by Lenore Zann in the English dub of MegaMan NT Warrior.

==== Dex Oyama and GutsMan.EXE ====
Dex Oyama (大山 デカオ, Ōyama Dekao), known as Dex Ogreon in the English anime and manga, is Lan's classmate and friend and the operator of GutsMan.EXE (ガッツマン, Gattsuman), who is often portrayed as a bully with a soft spot. He has a younger brother named Chisao, who is seen infrequently in Battle Network, and a recurring character in the anime. In the anime, Dex later gives up NetBattling to focus on his new career as a curry chef.

Dex is voiced by Numata Yuusuke in the original Japanese version and by Tony Sampson in the English dub.

GutsMan.EXE is voiced by Yoshimitsu Shimoyama in the original Japanese version and by Scott McNeil in the English dub.

==== Yai Ayanokoji and Glide.EXE ====
Yai Ayanokoji (綾小路 やいと, Ayanokōji Yaito). known as Yai Ayano in the English anime and manga, is Lan's classmate and friend and the operator of Glide.EXE (グライド, Guraido). In the first game only, her Navi's name is spelt Glyde.EXE instead. She is younger than the other main characters, as she skipped grades due to her intelligence, and, in the anime, operates out of her father's company, AyanoTech (Gabcom). In the anime, and sometimes the games, she secretly adores Chaud after he helped guide her out of a stuck elevator.

Yai is voiced by Kanamaru Hinako in the original Japanese version and by Jocelyne Loewen in the English dub.

Glide.EXE is voiced by Yasuhiko Kawazu in the original Japanese version and by Ted Cole in the English dub.

==== Eugene Chaud and ProtoMan.EXE ====
Eugene Chaud (伊集院 炎山, Ijūin Enzan), known as Chaud Blaze in the English anime and manga, is the operator and creator of ProtoMan.EXE (ブルース.ＥＸＥ, Blues.EXE). He is the son of the president of IPC, which was renamed BlazeQuest in the English anime and manga. Aside from the introduction he gives in the first game, he is exclusively referred to by his surname, Chaud. His mother died when he was young, and he was forced into becoming the vice-president of his father's corporation, a position which contributed to his initial cold attitude towards Lan. Over time, he gains more respect for Lan and begins to open up to others, but maintains his serious outlook during battle. In the games, he is an Official NetBattler who meets Lan while investigating a water shortage that WWW caused. He is introduced as a ruthless operator who takes his job seriously and will delete any Navis who get in the way, and despite originally seeing Lan as a pest, they slowly became friends.

In Battle Network 6, Chaud posed as the bodyguard of Mayor Cain. During Lan's confrontation with Cain, Chaud sheds his disguise and leads the arrest on Cain and Blackbeard.

Eugene Chaud is voiced by Mitsuki Saiga in the original Japanese version. In the English dub, he is voiced by Bill Switzer in season one and by Scott Perrie in AXESS.

ProtoMan.EXE is voiced by Masaya Matsukaze in the original Japanese version and by David Kaye in the English dub.

=== Villains ===
==== WWW ====
An organization formed by the main antagonist of the game, Lord Wily, formed to take over the real world and cyberworld out of jealousy that Tadashi Hikari caused his robotics research to be pushed aside in favor of network technology. Initially trying to conquer the internet through the Life Virus (Dream Virus), Wily is forced to disband WWW's members and go into hiding after Lan and MegaMan.EXE foil his plans. Throughout the series, he recruits multiple human members to operate various NetNavis.

===== Lord Wily =====
Lord Wily is the primary antagonist of the Battle Network franchise. He was a scientist who became jealous after his robotics research was pushed aside in favor of Tadashi Hikari's breakthroughs in network technology, and devoted his life to destroying network society. Wily appears as the main villain of Mega Man Battle Network, Mega Man Battle Network 3 and Mega Man Battle Network 6. He manipulates Sean Obihiro into leading the NetMafia Gospel in Mega Man Battle Network 2, and his son Dr. Regal is the main villain of Mega Man Battle Network 4 and Mega Man Battle Network 5.

Battle Network 6 reveals that, for a time, he had put aside his thirst for revenge, but the death of Baryl's father caused him to reconsider. When it came to a falling out with Mayor Cain, Joe Mach and Baryl remained by Wily's side while Captain Blackbeard, Yuita, Vic, and Prosecutor Ito sided with Cain. Wily later puts his anger aside and helps Lan to save the world while also recreating Colonel.EXE and Iris.EXE.

He is voiced by Katsumi Chō in the original Japanese version and by Paul Dobson in the English dub.

===== Mr. Match =====
Ken'ichi Hino (火野 ケンイチ, Hino Ken'ichi), known as Mr. Match in English, is the operator of FireMan.EXE, HeatMan.EXE, and FlameMan.EXE, who appears in every game except for Battle Network 5.

In Battle Network, he operates FireMan.EXE and fills the Hikari family's oven with viruses when posing as a repairman.

In Battle Network 2, Match is unaffiliated with Gospel, but lets Lan battle HeatMan.EXE at any time.

In Battle Network 3, Match rejoins WWW and operates FlameMan.EXE. He tricks Lan into installing several programs that raise SciLab's temperature to extreme levels.

Mr. Match is voiced by Katsuyuki Konishi in the original Japanese version and by Trevor Devall in the English dub.

TorchMan.EXE is voiced by Satoshi Katōgi in the original Japanese version and by Ross Douglas in the English dub.

HeatMan.EXE is voiced by Issei Futamata in the original Japanese version and by Brian Drummond in the English dub.

===== Mr. Higsby =====
Yamitarō Higure (日暮 闇太郎, Higure Yamitarō), known as Mr. Higsby in English, is a collector of rare Battle Chips who owns the chip shop "Higsby's" (Higure-ya (日暮屋)). His NetNavi, NumberMan.EXE (ナンバーマン Nanbāman), operates a similar chip shop from the cyberworld in the anime.

In the anime, Mr. Higsby and NumberMan.EXE are unconnected to WWW.

Mr. Higsby is voiced by Yūji Ueda in the original Japanese version and by Lee Tockar in the English dub.

NumberMan.EXE is voiced by Yūji Ueda in the original Japanese version and by Samuel Vincent in the English dub.

===== Maddy =====
Madoi Iroaya (色綾 まどい, Iroaya Madoi), inconsistently known as Ms. Madd, Maddy, and Madoi in English media, is an agent of WWW and the operator of the clown-like ColorMan.EXE, known as ColoredMan.EXE in Japanese, who has a launchable large ball as his mode of transportation. She was the mastermind behind altering the traffic signals in the city to cause accidents.

In the anime, she is named Maddy in English while ColorMan.EXE is renamed WackoMan.EXE in English. She has a brief stint with Gospel, but finds friendship with her fellow WWW operators. WackoMan.EXE was found in the TV series. WackoMan.EXE duplicates himself and tries to act strong, while he is a coward.

Maddy is voiced by Junko Noda in the original Japanese version and by Tabitha St. Germain in the English dub.

WackoMan.EXE is voiced by Andrew Toth in English.

===== Count Jack Zap =====
Jack Electel (ジャック・エレキテル, Jakku Erekiteru), also known as Count Elec (エレキ伯爵, Elekki Hakushaku), and Count Jack Zap in English, is an agent of WWW and the operator of ElecMan.EXE.

In the anime, he is the brother of Gauss Magnus and fosters a rivalry with him due to their mother's preference of one over the other.

In Beast+, his wife Ann confronts him over inheriting the assets of his estate.

Count Zap is voiced by Kenta Miyake in the original Japanese version and by Colin Murdock in the English dub.

ElecMan.EXE is voiced by Suzuki Chihiro in original Japanese version and by Kirby Morrow in the English dub.

===== Yahoot =====
Maha Jarma (マハ・ジャラマ, Maha Jarama), known as Yahoot in English, is an agent of WWW and Lord Wily's right-hand man, as well as the operator of MagicMan.EXE. His fate is revealed in Battle Chip Challenge where he quits his life of crime to help support his village in the nation of Edina.

In the anime, Yahoot is the host of a yoga television show. He is considered to be the world's foremost authority on curry and uses the profits from his curry shop, which Lan frequents, to fund the WWW's operations. Later on, he trains Dex to be a curry chef.

Yahoot is voiced by Keiichi Sonobe in original Japanese version and by Ron Halder in the English dub.

MagicMan.EXE is voiced by Katsuyuki Konishi in the original Japanese version and by Paul Dobson in the English dub.

===== Professor =====
The Professor is the main antagonist of MegaMan Network Transmission. According to Higsby, he is a high-ranking member of WWW who was its acting leader when Lord Wily was in hiding. He is responsible for spreading the Zero Virus, as well as the Beast viruses in Beast+, to wreak havoc across the Net. He also owns a sushi factory that serves as a front for his secret laboratory beneath it. After Zero is converted into a NetNavi using the MystData, he helps to defeat the Professor and sacrifices himself to destroy his airship. The Professor escapes by parachute, only to be arrested by the NetPolice.

He is voiced by Takurō Kitagawa in the original Japanese version.

===== Takeo Inukai =====
Takeo Inukai (犬飼猛雄, Inukai Takeo) is a member of the WWW in the games and Neo WWW in the anime, and the operator of BeastMan.EXE, who is known as SavageMan.EXE in English and appears in AXESS as a Darkloid. He later gains Asteroid BeastMan.EXE from Slur.

In Battle Network 3, Takeo is a zookeeper who freed animals to scare people.

In Stream, Takeo is a former animal trainer who was fired due to his harsh treatment of animals and used Asteroid BeastMan.EXE to control them as vengeance. He has a pet lion named Manosuke.

Takeo is voiced by Kiyoyuki Yanada in the original Japanese version.

BeastMan.EXE is voiced by Dai Matsumoto in the original Japanese version and by Scott McNeil in the English dub.

===== Noboru Sunayama =====
Noboru Sunayama (砂山ノボル, Sunayama Noboru) is a member of the WWW in the games and Neo WWW in the anime, and the operator of DesertMan.EXE, who appears in AXESS as a Darkloid.

He was a television producer of DNN who, in Battle Network 3, created the N1 Grand Prix as a plot to defeat Chaud and ProtoMan on live TV to showcase the World Three's power.

In Stream, Noboru instead operates Astroid DesertMan.EXE. He works for DNN and steals Wily memorabilia for Tesla.

Noboro is voiced by Ken Narita in the original Japanese version.

DesertMan.EXE is voiced by Kiyoyuki Yanada in the original Japanese version and by Ward Perry in the English dub.

===== Rei Saiko =====
Rei Saiko (西古レイ, Saiko Rei), known as Ray Saiko in the English version of Battle Chip Challenge, is a WWW operator in the games and a member of Neo WWW in the anime, and the operator of FlashMan.EXE, who appears in AXESS as a Darkloid. In the video game, he was a hypnotist who was banned from the industry for using a NetNavi to help him in his hypnosis which led to Wily recruiting him.

In Stream, Rei gained Asteroid FlashMan.EXE. He is the least acknowledged of the Neo WWW and, other than his introductory episode, where he operated a Navi-driven race car, his plots involve assisting other members of the Neo WWW.

Rei is voiced by Nobuyuki Hiyama in the original Japanese version.

FlashMan.EXE is voiced by Makoto Yasumura in Japanese and by Clay St. Thomas in English.

===== Anetta =====
Anetta (アネッタ) is the operator of PlantMan.EXE, also known as VineMan.EXE in English, in the games and Silk.EXE in the anime.

In the games, she is a nature-loving WWW agent who is brainwashed by Wily into believing that the cyberworld is destroying nature, making her act like an eco-terrorist.

In the anime, she was plagued by illness for most of her life with Silk.EXE acting as her nurse. Silk was deleted trying to save her from a burning hospital, with Anetta harboring a grudge towards Chaud for her misconception of the situation. After discovering the truth, she becomes Yai's rival for Chaud's affections.

Anetta is voiced by Rie Kugimiya in Japanese and by Maryke Hendrikse in English.

PlantMan.EXE is voiced by Hiroyuki Yoshino in Japanese and by Scott Logie in English.

===== Mayor Cain =====
Mayor Cain (first name unknown) is the mayor of Cyber City, the principal of Cyber Academy, and the benefactor of WWW who later leads a split faction of the organization. When operating as mayor, he has the vice-principal run the school in his place. Cain's grandfather created Falzar to counter the threat of Gregar and it being powerful like Gregar caused much damage which led to events that make his grandfather being called a "devil scientist". During his confrontation with Lan alongside Blackbeard, Cain reveals his grandfather's history and his plans to get his hands on the Cybeasts and control him so that he can redeem his grandfather's name. It is revealed that Cain's bodyguard was Chaud in disguise as he leads the NetPolice's CopyBots in arresting Cain and Blackbeard.

===== Joe Mach =====
Gō Mahha (麻波 剛, Mahha Gō), known as Joe Mach in English, is Lan's teacher at Cyber Academy who is later revealed to be BlastMan.EXE's operator and a WWW agent. He has a history with Baryl who trained him karate. Joe joined WWW because Wily saved his daughter's life, but later betrays WWW to save Lan. Though having been arrested, Joe had cooperated with the authorities and got a lighter sentence. He was allowed to congratulate his students at their graduation.

===== Captain Blackbeard =====
Captain Kurohige (キャプテン・クロヒゲ, Kyaputan Kurohige), known as Captain Blackbeard in English, was an animal trainer at Seaside Town's aquarium who was fired for his cruelty to its animals and the operator of DiveMan.EXE. He is a member of the WWW in Battle Network 6, and works for Wily of Beyondard in Beast. Blackbeard was present when Lan confronts Mayor Cain. Chaud sheds his bodyguard disguise and leads the arrest of Cain and Blackbeard.

In Beast+, he and Yuika are stranded in the world opposite of their own and form an alliance with BubbleMan to commit crimes.

===== Yuika =====
Chirol (チロル, Chiroru), known as Yuika in English, is the operator of the clown-like CircusMan.EXE who possesses four disembodied hands. She is a member of the WWW in Battle Network 6, and works for Wily of Beyondard in Beast.

In Beast+, she and Blackbeard are stranded in the world opposite of their own and form an alliance with BubbleMan to commit crimes.

===== Vic =====
Tsuyuharu Nyūdo (入道 露晴, Nyūdo Tsuyuharu), known as Vic in English, is the operator of ElementMan.EXE. He is a member of the WWW in Battle Network 6 after he failed to get a job as Cyber City's weather forecaster which went to someone else.

In the anime, Vic is an incompetent weather forecaster who was fired from his job. After BubbleMan loans him a Miniroid, he has ElementMan hack the Marine Land pool system to get revenge on Lan and co. after they unknowingly make fun of him.

===== Prosecutor Ito =====
Satoru Roppō (六方悟, Roppō Satoru), known as Prosecutor Ito in English, is a court prosecutor and the operator of JudgeMan.EXE. He is a member of the WWW in Battle Network 6 where he is also the creator of the Judge Tree.

In the anime, Ito seeks to eliminate NetCrime by unilaterally convicting Navis before they are taken into custody.

===== Baryl =====
Barrel (バレル, Bareru), known as Baryl in English, is the operator of Colonel.EXE and an official NetBattler from Netopia, who seeks Lan and MegaMan to form Team Colonel. In Battle Network 6, he joins the WWW. As a child, he was placed in Lord Wily's care while his father went to war; after Wily learned that Baryl's father was killed in combat, he raised Baryl as his own son. In the anime, he is an old friend of Dr. Wily who lived twenty years before the start of Stream and died by the time of its events, leaving Colonel.EXE a solo Navi. However, using the Past Tunnel, he is able to communicate with the characters of the present time and travel between timeframes.

====== Colonel.EXE ======
Colonel.EXE (カーネル, Kāneru) is the head of an elite team of Navis who freed the net from Nebula's influence in Battle Network 5, and part of the WWW in Battle Network 6. He is cold and ruthless, which Battle Network 6 reveals to be a result of his emotion data being separated from him and used to create a new Navi named Iris.EXE. His signature attacks include Screen Divide, a series of sword slashes, and Aspire Break, a powerful finishing move.

===== WWW's Solo NetNavis =====
- BombMan.EXE, known as BlasterMan.EXE in English, is a solo NetNavi that works for Lord Wily. He is voiced by Hidenari Ugaki in the original Japanese version and by Nick Harrison in the English dub.
- StoneMan.EXE is a solo NetNavi that works for Lord Wily. He is voiced by Hiroaki Ishikawa in the original Japanese version and by Ward Perry in the English dub.
- PlanetMan.EXE is a planet-themed NetNavi and the acting leader of the WWW area in Mega Man Battle Network 2. In the anime, he takes over a moon base and traps Commander Beef outside when he is sent to investigate. MegaMan.EXE and GutsMan.EXE went to the Moon go to stop him, and while GutsMan.EXE is occupied with the viruses, MegaMan.EXE confronts PlanetMan. With Lan using an extra code given to him by Mr. Famous, MegaMan.EXE uses his AquaCustom form to delete PlanetMan.EXE and save Commander Beef. PlanetMan.EXE is voiced by Dave "Squatch" Ward in the English dub.
- NapalmMan.EXE, known as MoltanticMan.EXE in English, is a solo NetNavi that works for PlanetMan.EXE in Mega Man Battle Network 2. He guards the door in the WWW area, which opens if the player has the V3 Navi BattleChips.
- PharaohMan.EXE is a solo NetNavi that works for PlanetMan.EXE in Mega Man Battle Network 2. He appears as a secret boss in Battle Network and in Battle Network 2 in the WWW area, where he tries to prevent MegaMan.EXE from advancing. In Network Transmission, PharaohMan.EXE guards the legendary WWW area. PharaohMan.EXE is voiced by Keiji Fujiwara in the original Japanese version and by Michael Kopsa in the English dub.
- BubbleMan.EXE is a solo NetNavi that works for Lord Wily and is DrillMan's "cousin". In AXESS, BubbleMan.EXE is a Darkloid that is loyal to ShadeMan. He is voiced by Chiyako Shibahara in the original Japanese version and by Gabe Khouth in the English dub.
- DrillMan.EXE is a solo NetNavi that works for Lord Wily and is BubbleMan's "cousin". In the anime, he is owned by the assistant of a small company president and used to distract ProtoMan.EXE while he flees with a part needed for the new PET. He is voiced by Trevor Devall in the English dub.
- GravityMan.EXE is a solo NetNavi that works for the Professor and encounters MegaMan.EXE in the Strange Grav Center, where he acted as a sentry. He initiates his extermination sequence, only to be deleted by MegaMan.EXE. He also appears in AXESS as a Darkloid. GravityMan.EXE is voiced by Yoshimitsu Shimoyama in Japanese and by Robert O. Smith in English.
- StarMan.EXE, known as NovaMan.EXE in English, is a solo NetNavi that works for the Professor. He is distributing fake vaccines for the Zero Virus, but retreats when MegaMan.EXE confronts him. He later appears in the No Grav Zone, where he fights MegaMan.EXE but is deleted. He also appears in AXESS as a Darkloid. StarMan.EXE is voiced by Kumiko Yokote in the original Japanese version.
- SwordMan.EXE is a solo NetNavi that works for the Professor, with three swords that each give him a different personality. He appears as a boss guarding the path to the Life Virus, defeating ProtoMan.EXE before MegaMan.EXE defeats him. In the anime, he is a Darkloid. In the Japanese version, SwordMan.EXE's three heads are voiced by Tetsu Inada (red sword), Daisuke Kirii (blue sword), and Tsuguo Mogami (yellow sword). In the English dub, SwordMan.EXE is voiced by Paul Dobson.

==== NetMafia Gospel ====
Gospel (ゴスペル, Gosuperu) is a NetMafia organization led by the mysterious Boss Gospel (ゴスペル首領, Gosperu Shuryō) and a wolf-like monstrosity called Gospel which they unleashed. In the English, Boss Gospel is known as Kid Grave, the organization is known as Grave, and the beast is known as the Grave Virus Beast.

===== Sean Obihiro =====
Shun Obihiro (帯広 シュン, Obihiro Shun), known as Sean Obihiro in English, is the true identity of Shuryou Gospel and the crime boss of Gospel. When he was a child, his parents were killed in an airplane crash. Ostracized by his peers, he decided to strike back at society by forming Gospel while taking the alias of Lord Gospel, but was unaware that Wily was manipulating him. Sean eventually changes his ways after Lan offers to be his friends.

Battle Chip Challenge reveals that FreezeMan was his original NetNavi.

In the anime, his Lord Gospel form is a robot which Lord Wily controls and uses the alias of Kid Grave. After Gospel virus is destroyed, Bass takes over the robot's body. n the manga, he works undercover as Kei Yuki, a professor from Ameroupe.

Kid Grave is voiced by Noriko Hidaka in the original Japanese version of the first anime, Junko Minagawa in the original Japanese version of AXESS, and Cathy Weseluck in the English dub.

===== Gauss Magnus =====
Gauss Magnets (ガウス・マグネッツ, Gaussu Magunettsu), known as Gauss Magnus in English, is the CEO of Gauss Inc. and the original operator of MagnetMan.EXE as well as a high-ranking member of Gospel. In the games, he is arrested after attempting to hijack an airplane.

In the anime, Gauss is a cross-dresser with "Wily-mania" that was defeated by WWW. Gauss also reveals that Count Zap is his brother, something that was only strongly implied in the games.

In Stream, Gauss is sprung from prison and acts as Neo WWW's janitor for a short period of time before playing matchmaker for his daughter and Charlie Airstar.

Gauss is voiced by Hideyuki Umezu in original Japanese version and by Ron Halder in the English dub.

MagnetMan is voiced by Tomoyuki Komo in the original Japanese version and by Michael Dobson in the English dub.

===== Arashi Kazefuki =====
Arashi Kazefuki (風吹 アラシ, Kazefuki Arashi) is the operator of AirMan.EXE.

In Battle Network 2, Arashi poses as a mechanic and has AirMan hack into Yai's air conditioning system to infect it with gas. He is supposedly killed by a bomb hidden in a suitcase as punishment for his failure.

In the anime, Arashi is the head of a small company. He controls AirMan.EXE from a courtesy phone in the subway station as part of his revenge on AyanoTech for his company being outdone by them. The NetAgents arrest him upon AirMan.EXE's defeat.

Arashi is voiced by Susumu Chiba in the original Japanese version and by Brian Dobson in the English dub.

AirMan.EXE is voiced by Susumu Chiba in the original Japanese version and by Peter New in the English dub.

===== Speedy Dave =====
Daisuke Hayami (速見 ダイスケ, Hayami Daisuke), known as Speedy Dave in English, is the operator of QuickMan.EXE who sided with Gospel due to disliking littering and the destruction of nature.

In the games, he is a park ranger and attempts to destroy a dam, but is arrested after Lan defeats him.

In the anime, he is still a park ranger. While he has a connection with Sal, Dave pretends to side to with Gospel under the alias of Earth Avenger. He is not arrested in the end.

Speedy Dave is voiced by Kosuke Okano in the original Japanese version and by Kirby Morrow in the English dub.

QuickMan.EXE is voiced by Masaru Motegi in the original Japanese version and by Alistair Abell in the English dub.

===== Dusk =====
Dark Miyabi (ダーク・ミヤビ, Dāku Miyabi), known as Dusk in English, is a mysterious mercenary-for-hire and the operator of ShadowMan.EXE, who sides with Gospel in the second game and Team Colonel in the fifth, under the alias of Mr. Dark in English.

In the anime, only his Navi appeared in the second season of EXE and was mentioned in AXESS. He first appeared in Stream, and he becomes one of the Cross Fusion members marked by Duo. In both, he and ShadowMan.EXE set out to eliminate MegaMan until Lord Wily convinces him to put aside his work and join Lan.

Dusk is voiced by Kenichi Obo in the original Japanese version.

ShadowMan.EXE is voiced by Kentaro Ito in the original Japanese version and by Ron Halder in the English dub.

===== Princess Pride =====
Princess Pride (プリンセス・プライド, Purinsesu Puraido) is the princess of Creamland, which is known as Brightland in English, and the operator of KnightMan.EXE.

In Battle Network 2, she attempts to kill a group of Official NetBattlers using booby traps, but inadvertently falls into one herself. Chaud suspects that she joined Gospel to get revenge on the countries that abandoned Creamland.

In Battle Network 5: Team Colonel, she seeks to help Creamland by mining MagnoMetal, but in doing so accidentally puts Mayl, Dex, and Yai in danger. Soon after, she and KnightMan join Team Colonel.

In the anime, Princess Pride befriends Lan while disguised as a boy and has no connections with Gospel. Princess Pride reappears in Stream as one of the Cross Fusion members marked by Duo.

Princess Pride is voiced by Tomoko Kawakami in the original Japanese and by Jillian Michaels in English.

KnightMan.EXE is voiced by Jin Horikawa in Japanese and by Russell Roberts in English.

===== NetMafia Gospel's Solo NetNavis =====
- FreezeMan.EXE is a solo NetNavi that works for Gospel as their Supreme Commander and leads their attacks on the Net, taking control of environmental control systems to cause natural disasters. In the anime, FreezeMan.EXE is responsible for the near-deletion of FireMan.EXE, and later controls the robot penguins to freeze DenTech City. MegaMan.EXE struggles to fight him until HeatMan.EXE arrives to assist him. During the threat of the Gospel Virus, FreezeMan.EXE fights HeatMan.EXE again, and HeatMan.EXE manages to defeat him. When FreezeMan.EXE retreats to Gospel to have Lord Gospel heal him, ShadowMan.EXE arrives and deletes him, which is removed from the English dub and changed to make it look like HeatMan.EXE deleted him. FreezeMan.EXE is voiced by Soichiro Tanaka in original Japanese version and by Mark Oliver in the English dub.
- CutMan.EXE is a solo NetNavi that is the vice-commander of Yumland's Occupation force and is tasked with eliminating the survivors of the countries that ShadowMan.EXE attacks. In the anime, CutMan.EXE is briefly heard warning MegaMan.EXE and his allies about the threat of Grave. He later makes himself known to MegaMan.EXE following QuickMan.EXE's failure to destroy the dam. Combining with WoodMan.EXE's powers, MegaMan.EXE uses the Electro-Wood Tower to delete CutMan.EXE. It is later revealed that CutMan.EXE had five brothers named Jirō, Saburō, Shirō, Gorō, and Rokurō (Vinny, Sammy, Jerry, Joey, and Nicky in English), who attempted to take revenge on MegaMan.EXE for killing Tarō. In the Japanese version, CutMan.EXE Tarō and CutMan.EXE Jirō are voiced by Chiyako Shibahara, CutMan.EXE Saburō is voiced by Tomoko Ishimura, CutMan.EXE Shirō is voiced by Kei Kobayashi, CutMan.EXE Gorō is voiced by Kumiko Watanabe, CutMan.EXE Rokurō is voiced by Kaori Matoi, and CutMan.EXE Chōrō is voiced by Hiroshi Ito. In the English dub, the CutMan.EXE brothers are all voiced by Scott McNeil.

==== Bass.EXE ====
Bass, known as Forte (フォルテ, Forute) in Japan, was intended to be the first fully autonomous NetNavi, completely independent of an operator. Bass.EXE was falsely blamed for causing problems in the original internet, and the SciLab Elite Corps nearly killed him. Dr. Cossack, his creator and the only human he trusted, was arrested before he could get Bass.EXE to safety, leading Bass.EXE to believe he had betrayed him and causing him to harbor hatred toward humanity.

In Battle Network 2, Sean Obihiro of Gospel attempts to make an army of Bass.EXE copies, eventually leading to the accidental creation of the Gospel Megavirus. In the game's ending, Bass.EXE is shown deleting a clone while swearing revenge upon humanity.

Bass.EXE returns to fulfill this promise in Battle Network 3, where he assists Wily in using Alpha to destroy network society; however, he and Wily are later swallowed by Alpha. However, the remains of the Gospel Megavirus save him and fuse with him. Bass.EXE is later confronted by MegaMan.EXE in the secret area and defeated. It is revealed that Bass.EXE has amnesia, but MegaMan reminds him of his creator Cossack and he leaves in confusion.

In Battle Network 4, Bass.EXE is found deep in the Undernet hibernating as a statue, and reawakens upon meeting MegaMan.EXE. After being defeated, he retreats and vows to become stronger.

In Battle Network 5, a post-game boss created through dark power takes on his likeness, but he can also be fought. When defeated, he leaves of his own volition.

This trend continues until Battle Network 6. There, Bass is confronted in his gravestone in the Undernet and several times afterwards. The final confrontation with Bass is him at his most powerful, having absorbed the power of a Cybeast into his body. After being defeated, he drifts away into the net and is available as a random encounter in the Graveyard area.

Bass.EXE is voiced by Keiko Nemoto in the original Japanese version and by Matt Hill in the English dub.

===== Gospel =====
Gospel is a monstrous wolf-like virus who was accidentally created by Sean Obihiro when he was making clones of Bass.

In Battle Network 2, Gospel was created from a collection of bugs in various programs, while in the anime, Gospel and Bass were created from the remnants of PharaohMan. Gospel and the Cybeast Gregar are similar in appearance because they were both born from a fusion of bugs. Remnants of Gospel later saves Bass' life and fuses with him.

=== Other characters ===
==== Dr. Yuichiro Hikari ====
Yuichiro Hikari (光祐一朗, Hikari Yūichirō) is Lan's father and the creator of MegaMan. He followed in his father's footsteps, working as a scientist and a renowned authority on the net. As such, he is often away working on his latest projects at SciLab. In Axess, his focus shifts to merging operator and NetNavi in a process called Cross Fusion, which later inspired the "Double Soul" ("Soul Unison").

His father, Dr. Tadashi Hikari, is considered to be the founder of the computer networking system within the Battle Network series. As such, Yuichiro is regarded as an expert on the subject of networking. Although he is not seen with a NetNavi of his own, he is the creator of several NetNavis, including MegaMan.EXE. In the games, in an attempt to save his dying son, Hub, he creates MegaMan by placing his DNA into a Navi program.

In the anime, Yuichiro is often responsible for new designs and additions to existing PET models, and his research into the nature of Dimensional Areas leads to the creation of the "Synchro Chip" and Cross Fusion, an ability that allows an operator to merge with their NetNavi.

In the original Japanese version, he is voiced by Koichi Nagano and by Tokuyoshi Kawashima in Stream-Beast+. In the English dub, he is voiced by Michael Adamthwaite.

==== Haruka Hikari ====
Haruka Hikari (光はる香, Hikari Haruka) is Lan's mother, who works at home and prepares meals for her family. In the anime, she is portrayed as somewhat naïve, though wishing the best for her loved ones. In the fifth game, she ends up inviting Mayl over to teach her cooking, with Mayl teaching her to NetBattle.

Haruka Hikari is voiced by Masako Jo in original Japanese version and by Nicole Oliver in the English dub.

==== Ms. Mari ====
Mariko Ōzono (大園 まり子, Ōzono Mariko), known as Ms. Mari in English, is the teacher of class 5-A at the ACDC/DenTech school (Densan), which Lan, Mayl, Dex and Yai attend. She serves as the adult chaperon to many of Lan's activities. She does not have a NetNavi in the anime, and uses a generic one in the games.

She is voiced by Noriko Hidaka in original Japanese version and by Janyse Jaud in the English dub.

==== Sal ====
Saloma (サロマ, Saroma), known as Sal in English, is an environmentalist and the owner of a boxed lunch stand who is also the operator of WoodMan.EXE.

In the anime, Sal is a gardener who takes on the identity Black Rose (黒バラ仮面, Kurobara Kamen) as a Net Agent. She also has a crush on Speedy Dave.

Sal is voiced by Omi Minami in Japanese and by Kelly Sheridan in English.

WoodMan.EXE is voiced by Toshihide Tsuchiya in Japanese and by Lee Tockar in English.

==== Masa ====
Masa (マサ, Masa), known as Maysa in English, is the owner of a fish stand and the operator of SharkMan.EXE.

In the anime, he has a secret identity as Commander Beef (ビーフ司令, Bīfu Shirei), one of the Net Agents, and only uses SharkMan.EXE while costumed. By day, he often lectures the kids on the various merits of fish and calcium, and claims that he does not have a NetNavi. Masa has a crush on Ms. Mari, but Ms. Mari has fallen for Commander Beef. In Beyondard, Masa is the leader of the human resistance, operating under the name Masked Captain (覆面隊長, Fukumen Taichō). Although he thinks NetNavi's are lame in the anime, he has a NetNavi even in the first Battle Network game and doesn't disguse himself as Commander Beef.

Masa is voiced by Jin Horikawa in the original Japanese version and by Richard Newman in the English dub.

SharkMan is voiced by Takumi Suzuki in the original Japanese version and by Don Brown in the English dub.

==== Miyuki Kuroi ====
Miyuki Kuroi (黒井みゆき, Kuroi Miyuki), known as Miyu in English, is a fortune teller and the operator of SkullMan.EXE.

She is an antique shop proprietor and also a Net Agent in the anime, taking on the identity of Mysteriyu (みゆみゆ, Miyumiyu).

Miyu is voiced by Kumiko Yokote in Japanese and by Anna Cummer in English.

SkullMan.EXE is voiced by Riichi Nishimoto in Japanese and by Brian Drummond in English.

==== Ribbita ====
Kero Midorikawa (緑川ケロ, Midorikawa Kero), known as Ribitta in English, is often seen as a reporter or a Television presenter at DNN and the operator of ToadMan.EXE.

In Battle Network 5, she joins Team Colonel while trying to get an interview with the team.

In the anime, Ribbita is still a television personality. She and Higsby are later the commentators for the N1 Grand Prix.

Ribbita is voiced by Akiko Nakagawa in original Japanese version and by Sharon Alexander in the English dub.

ToadMan.EXE is voiced by Akiko Nakagawa in the original Japanese version and by Samuel Vincent in the English dub.

==== Mr. Famous ====
Eguchi-meijin (江口名人), known as Mr. Famous in English, is a scientist working with Yuichiro. In the games, he is the creator of several Navis, including GateMan.EXE, KendoMan.EXE., GridMan.EXE (known as FootMan.EXE in English), and Punk.EXE, although he does not have a NetNavi in the anime.

Mr. Famous is voiced by Keiji Fujiwara in the original Japanese version and by Jonathan Holmes in the English dub.

==== Ms. Yuri ====
Ms. Yuri (Yuriko Ōzono (大園 ゆり子, Ōzono Yuriko)) is the twin sister of Ms. Mari. In the first Battle Network, she was a WWW agent who left the organization to become a summer school teacher. She is a palette swap of Ms. Mari in the game, but is redesigned and given a much more significant role in the anime.

In the anime, she is the second-in-command of Nebula, and the operator of NeedleMan (NeedleMan was operated by Yai's unnamed gardener in Mega Man Network Transmission). She was separated from her twin sister fifteen years before the start of the series, and raised by Dr. Wily. At the end of Axess, she was faced with the choice of killing her own sister or betraying Nebula. In the end, she cuts ties with Nebula.

In Stream, Ms. Yuri becomes one of the Cross Fusion members marked by Duo.

== Gameplay ==
A typical battlefield. The player waits for their Custom Gauge to fill before selecting the Battle Chips to attack with for the turn.

Mega Man Battle Network is a real-time tactical RPG series. To progress through the games, the player must alternately navigate the outside world as Lan Hikari and the Net as MegaMan.EXE, each containing certain tasks that must be completed to allow advancement in the other. Controlling Lan, the player may travel around the world map, interact with non-player characters, check email, purchase items, initiate Net missions, or speak with MegaMan.EXE through his PET. In contrast with traditional Mega Man entries in which battle and movement through the levels happen in the same setting, Battle Network's combat occurs only through by battling computer viruses within the Net. This cyber world is represented by a series of branching pathways and nodes, where MegaMan.EXE can travel to both new and previously visited locations, find and purchase items, and fight viruses. Battles do not generally appear on the field screen of the Net but are usually set as random encounters.

The battlefield itself is made up of 18 tiles divided into two groups of nine, one group being space in which MegaMan.EXE may freely move and the other group being space inhabited by enemies. Akin to other Mega Man games, MegaMan.EXE possesses an arm cannon called the "Mega Buster". The player can transition among the nine provided tiles and fire the Mega Buster at enemies from across the screen. The objective of each battle is to delete all the viruses by reducing their hit points (HP) to zero. If MegaMan.EXE's own health depletes, a game over occurs. In order to attack without the Mega Buster, the player must utilize Battle Chips, which are placed into a "folder" before the battle starts, and are drawn at random. Starting with the third game, Battle Chips are organized into three primary categories which limits how many of the same chip can be used in the same folder: Standard (4 of the same, 30 in the folder), Mega (1 of the same, 5 in the folder), and Giga (only 1 per folder). Excluding the asterisk code, which was introduced in 2, the player can only use Battle Chips that have either the same name, or share the letter. Selecting a specific combination of Battle Chips results in Program Advances, which give the player either a strong attack, or continual use of the Battle Chip used for several seconds. Each Battle Chip also has an element assigned to it, and hitting an enemy with its weakness will result in them taking double damage.

The series also has multiplayer functionality where two players can either fight, or trade chips with each other using the Game Link Cable; trading the opposite version's Mega Chips in 4–6 will result in them appearing as "Secret Chips" in the Chip Library, however Giga Chips cannot be traded .

== Development ==
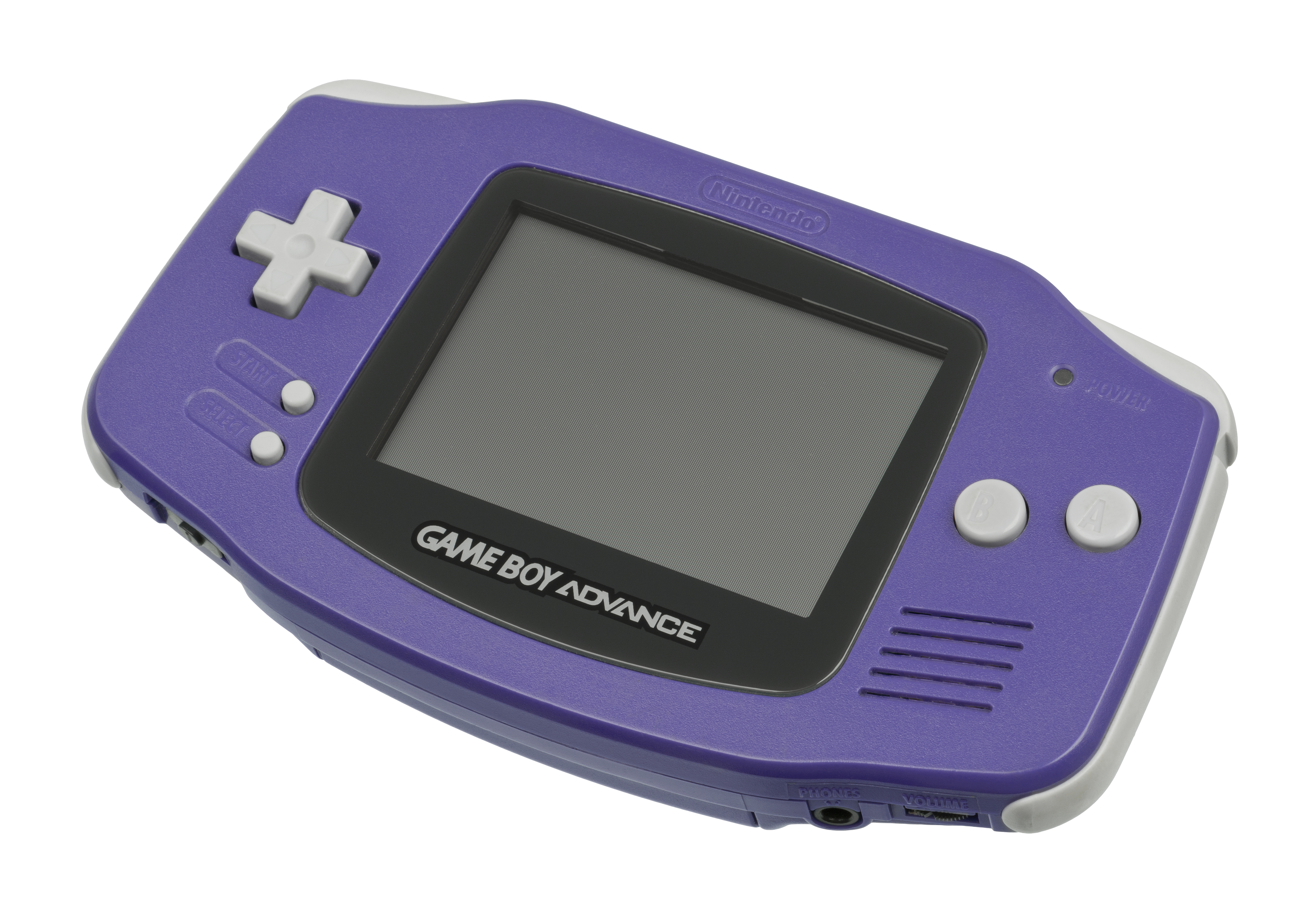
The original Mega Man Battle Network and its direct sequels were developed for the Game Boy Advance.

Resulting from a cancelled horror game, the original Mega Man Battle Network was developed by Capcom Production Studio 2 for the Game Boy Advance handheld video game console.

Battle Network 3 was intended as the finale of the series. However, development on the fourth game started a short while after its release. Writer Masakazu Eguchi wrote that for the last three mainline entries, the developers primarily focused on evolving the battle system from the third game. Later entries in the series also suffered from space limitations, as they still used the same ROM sizes as earlier entries, which lead to the overworld sprites being redrawn to be smaller and more cartoonish. The final game in the series, Battle Network 6, redid several of the sprites again and changed the environment, due to the developers wanting to make the game feel fresh.

Two players about to commence Crossover Battle 2 in a fan retranslation of Battle Network 6. Since the third Boktai game was not released outside of Japan, it was removed from international versions.

Starting with Battle Network 4, the series began including content from Hideo Kojima's series Boktai, which was developed and published by Konami; the crossover content mainly included Battle Chips, bosses, and entire areas themed around Boktai and vampires. However, content related to the third Boktai game would be removed in international versions of 5: Double Team DS and 6 since it was not released outside of Japan, as would Lunar Knights content in Star Force.

=== Music ===
The music of Mega Man Battle Network was primarily composed by Akari Kaida, Yoshino Aoki, and Toshihiko Horiyama. An extensive soundtrack album, collecting 281 music tracks from the six mainline games (in addition to Mega Man Battle Chip Challenge and the Japanese-only Rockman EXE 4.5 Real Operation), was officially released in 2021 on Spotify and iTunes to celebrate the series' 20th anniversary.

== Games ==
=== Mainline games ===
Mega Man Battle Network Mega Man Star Force
2001	Mega Man Battle Network
2001	Mega Man Battle Network 2
2002	Mega Man Battle Network 3
2003	Mega Man Network Transmission
2003	Rockman EXE WS
2003	Mega Man Battle Chip Challenge
2003	Mega Man Battle Network 4
2004	Rockman EXE 4.5 Real Operation
2004	Mega Man Battle Network 5
2005	Mega Man Battle Network 5: Double Team DS
2005	Mega Man Battle Network 6
2006	Mega Man Star Force
2007	Mega Man Star Force 2
2008	Mega Man Star Force 3
2009	Rockman EXE Operate Shooting Star
2010–2022
2023	Mega Man Battle Network Legacy Collection
2024–2025
2026	Mega Man Star Force Legacy Collection

==== Mega Man Battle Network ====
A terrorist organization called WWW (World Three) attempted to destroy the world with the use of a super virus known as the Life Virus. Despite interference by Lan and MegaMan, the members stole the four element programs they needed in order to make it and succeeded in its creation. The virus was as strong as predicted, but was destroyed by MegaMan. Its defeat forced WWW to retreat. This game received an averaged score of 80% score on GameRankings and 79% on Metacritic.

Mega Man Battle Network was later re-released for the Nintendo DS as Rockman.EXE: Operate Shooting Star, which serves both as an enhanced port of the original, as well as a crossover with the Star Force series. The NetNavi exclusive to Operate Shooting Star, ClockMan.EXE, was a winner from a CoroCoro Comics contest. Despite initial strong sales, it would only sell 60,000 copies by the end of 2009, which contributed to the cancellation of Star Force 4. Capcom's Vice President of Strategic Planning & Business Development at the time, Christian Svennson, stated the company had no plans to release the game for Western territories; however, an English fan translation released in 2018.

==== Mega Man Battle Network 2 ====
The following summer after WWW's defeat, a new terrorist group called Gospel emerges. Their tactics differed considerably compared to WWW, as they appeared to have no set goal. Gospel's plan had seemingly consisted of only causing random destruction with their navis. Lan and MegaMan battled every member and prevented the worst possible situations. However, Gospel's hidden plan was to re-create the ultimate net navi, Bass. Using bug fragments, they planned to make a large army of Bass navis to take over the world. Unknown to Gospel, their method of creating Bass was imperfect, and his abilities were vastly below predictions. In an attempt to make copies of Bass to create an army, the leader of Gospel overloaded energy to the bug fragments; but something went wrong and the concoction transformed into a giant wolf-like multi-bug organism. Although the bug beast was stronger than before, Lan and MegaMan managed to eliminate it. This game received an averaged score of 82% score on GameRankings and 81% on MetaCritic.

==== Mega Man Battle Network 3 ====
Mega Man Battle Network 3 was released in late-2002 in Japan, and mid-2003 internationally; the game follows a revived WWW seeking to release Alpha, the original prototype of the internet. New to the game is the ability to customize Mega Man by placing blocks in a grid, however placing blocks incorrectly will cause a bug to occur. Battle Network 3 was the first game to get two distinct versions, although this wasn't the case in Japan initially, which didn't get Blue until a few months after White's release. (Note: White was simply called Battle Network Rockman.EXE 3 in Japan, while Blue is called Battle Network Rockman.EXE 3: Black.)

Like with the previous two games, reception to Battle Network 3 was positive, although some thought the game had innovated too little. The game also topped sales charts, with both versions selling a total of 768,000 units in Japan at the end of 2003.

==== Mega Man Battle Network 4 ====
Released in December 2003 in Japan, and June 2004 in North America, Mega Man Battle Network 4 involves a meteor on trajectory towards Earth, and a new crime syndicate "Nebula" corrupting Navis with Dark Chips. Style Changes are removed in this installment, instead being replaced with Double Souls (Soul Unisons), which can be activated by sacrificing a certain chip. During the game, players will have several scenarios they encounter which are different depending on the version.

Reception to Battle Network 4 was mixed-to-positive, although it too received lower review scores than the first three, which much criticism going to the lack of any real story outside of tournament scenarios. In addition, Blue Moon received criticism due to a bug on the Nintendo DS that would cause the game to slow down significantly when exiting from battle during the WoodMan scenario, which was acknowledged by Nintendo and fixed in time for the DS Lite. Despite this, Battle Network 4 is the best-selling entry in the series, selling 1.35 million copies worldwide as of 2009.

==== Mega Man Battle Network 5 ====
Nebula attacks again, this time with an all-out invasion. They kidnap Lan's father and use SciLab's computers to take over the internet. In response, either Chaud or Baryl (depending on the version) create a team of elite net navis and operators. Lan and MegaMan are the first members. As the story progresses, more team members are gained, and more areas of the net are liberated. When all of the net is won back, the team locates Nebula's headquarters and attempt to defeat the organization. The GBA versions received an average score of 68% on GameRankings and 67% on MetaCritic, whereas the NDS version received 70% on GameRankings and 68% on MetaCritic.

==== Mega Man Battle Network 6 ====
Mega Man Battle Network 6 is the final game in the series, in which Lan's father gets a new job and the family moves to Cyber City, leaving behind Netto Hikari's classmates and friends from ACDC Town. WWW destroy once again, aiming to revive the legendary Cybeasts, Gregar and Falzar. The Double Soul system is replaced with the similar Cross System, this time allowing the player to activate at any time, although it will be disabled if hit by its elemental weakness; players are also able to "Beast Out" MegaMan for a limited time, allowing him to tap into the power of the Cybeasts. Like the previous games, the Crosses and Beast Out differs depending on the version.

The developers have stated the decision to end the series with the sixth game was only made part-way through due to wanting a new Mega Man series for the Nintendo DS; the English version also removed a significant amount of content, mainly the removal of the Boktai crossover. Reviewers generally showed little enthusiasm for Battle Network 6, with it being near-universally highlighted for its lack of changes from previous installments in terms of graphics and gameplay, although some praised its story.

=== Spin-offs ===
==== Mega Man Network Transmission ====
Released as part of Mega Man's fifteenth anniversary, Mega Man Network Transmission is a platform game developed by Arika and released for the GameCube in mid-2003. The game was first announced in September 2002 at the Tokyo Game Show. The game acts is set between 1 and 2, and involves a new "Zero Virus" that makes Navis go berserk. The game mixes the gameplay of the Classic series 2D platforming and Battle Network series tactical RPG elements, with Keiji Inafune stating the decision was made by Arika to "preserve the core of Rockman".

Reception to Network Transmission was divisive; a major point of contempt was the game's high difficulty, while the overall presentation drew mixed reactions. On Metacritic, the game averaged a 65/100 indicating "mixed or average" reviews.

==== Rockman.EXE WS ====
Lan Hikari and MegaMan.EXE face off against the WWW. The story adapts aspects of both the first Mega Man Battle Network game as well as the anime series, MegaMan NT Warrior. The gameplay is similar to that of Mega Man Network Transmission.

==== Mega Man Battle Chip Challenge ====
Developed with help from Inti Creates, who also developed the Mega Man Zero and ZX series, Mega Man Battle Chip Challenge utilizes a different battle system where players setup 12 Battle Chips on a grid called a "Program Deck", three of which are randomly selected. Aside from the Game Boy Advance version, the game also saw a release on the WonderSwan Color under the title Rockman.EXE: N1 Battle, being among the last games released for the console.

Unlike other games, contemporary reception to Battle Chip Challenge was mostly negative, with many critics disliking the lack of audience participation and aging presentation, although the audio was praised. The game currently has a 54/100 on Metacritic.

==== Rockman.EXE 4.5: Real Operation ====
Rockman.EXE 4.5: Real Operation was released in Japan-only on August 6, 2004. The "Real Operation" part of the title refers to how the Game Boy Advance functions as its own PET; during battles, players don't control the Navi directly, instead giving it instructions to follow. Reportedly, the game's development was "hell" due to it being completed in less than a year, in-between Battle Network 4 and 5. The game was re-released for the Wii U Virtual Console in 2016.

==== Other games ====
Rockman.EXE: The Medal Operation, and Rockman.EXE: Battle Chip Stadium are a pair of arcade games released in 2005 and 2006; The Medal Operation is a medal game based on Battle Network 5 where players could win chocolate, and Battle Chip Stadium uses the familiar battle system and is based upon Battle Network 6. Service for Battle Chip Stadium ended in April 2014.

Two mobile games were released in Japan, Rockman.EXE: Phantom of Network in 2004, and Rockman.EXE: Legend of Network in 2006; both games feature the same gameplay as the mainline entries and include exclusive characters. As of January 1, 2018, both games are no longer available for purchase. Despite their obscurity, many people have wished for them to see a re-release of them onto modern platforms. Both mobile games were eventually preserved in 2023, and received a fan translation in 2024, allowing the games to be played in English.

A compilation, Mega Man Battle Network Legacy Collection, was released in April 2023, bringing the series to Nintendo Switch, PlayStation 4, and Windows. The compilation includes all six of the numbered games, including both versions of Battle Network 3–6. Physical versions of the collection are sold as one game, while digital versions split the games between two separate volumes.

== Other media ==
=== Anime ===
The games were adapted into an anime series titled MegaMan NT Warrior, which premiered in Japan on March 4, 2002, and concluded on September 30, 2006, lasting 209 episodes; the English dub of the series was handled by Viz Media, who outsourced the voice acting to the Ocean Group. It lasted for five series, subtitled EXE, Axess, Stream, Beast and Beast+, although only EXE and Axess would be dubbed into English. An alternate English dub by Voiceovers Unlimited would air in South-East Asian countries, which followed the Japanese script more closely, and lacked the censorship that NT Warrior had.

A film set during the events of Stream, Rockman.EXE the Movie: Program of Light and Darkness, premiered in Japanese theatres on March 12, 2005, as a double-billing with the Duel Masters film Duel Masters: Curse of the Deathphoenix. The film grossed a total of US$6,178,840 within three weeks of its release.

=== Manga ===
Two separate manga series were created by Shogakukan and published in their monthly magazine CoroCoro Comics; MegaMan NT Warrior by Ryo Takamisaki which lasted for 13 volumes, and Battle Story MegaMan NT Warrior by Keijima Jun and Miho Asada which consisted of 4 volumes. Viz Media would release MegaMan NT Warrior in North America between 2004 and 2008, while Battle Story only saw a release in Japan, Indonesia and certain European countries.

=== Board game ===
In 2004, Capcom released Rockman.EXE: Catan, a licensed version of The Settlers of Catan with the Battle Network motif. The game came in standard and portable types, with the portable version being magnetic.
