= Mega Man Battle Network Legacy Collection =

- Developers: Capcom; NeoBards Entertainment
- Publisher: Capcom
- Director: Masakazu Eguchi
- Producers: Masachika Kawata; Ken Mendoza; Naoto Oyama
- Series: Mega Man Battle Network
- Engine: MT Framework
- Platforms: Nintendo Switch, PlayStation 4, Windows
- Release: WW: April 14, 2023
- Genre: Real-time tactical role-playing
- Modes: Single-player, multiplayer

Mega Man Battle Network Legacy Collection (Note: Japanese: ロックマンエグゼ アドバンスドコレクション, Hepburn: Rokkuman Eguze Adobansudo Korekushon; lit. Rockman.EXE Advanced Collection) is a video game compilation based on Capcom's Mega Man series. It compiles all six main entries in the Mega Man Battle Network series, originally released for the Game Boy Advance between 2001 and 2005. Like other Mega Man Legacy Collection entries, it also includes various enhancements and behind-the-scenes materials. The compilation is split between two volumes, both of which were released simultaneously in 2023 on Nintendo Switch, PlayStation 4, and Windows.

== Overview ==
Battle Network Legacy Collection is split between two volumes, each containing three numbered entries in the Mega Man Battle Network series. As Battle Network 3–6 each received two different versions when the games were originally released, both versions of each game are included, bringing the total to 10 games. Volume 1 contains Mega Man Battle Network (2001), Battle Network 2 (2001), and Battle Network 3 (Note: Includes Blue Version and White Version) (2002), while Volume 2 contains Battle Network 4 (Note: Includes Red Sun and Blue Moon versions) (2003), Battle Network 5 (Note: Includes Team ProtoMan and Team Colonel versions) (2004), and Battle Network 6 (Note: Includes Cybeast Falzar and Cybeast Gregar versions) (2005).

Each game is playable in Japanese or English. Content and features omitted from the original English releases have been restored, including most of the crossover content based on Konami's Boktai series. The games in the collection were updated to support competitive battling and battle chip trading via online multiplayer, as well as trading customizations from certain games. The collection also includes an art gallery, a music player, and additional screen-filtering options. In addition, battle records can be traded between games, and all 15 battle chips that were only distributed via Japanese events can be enabled. Other features include the ability to enable "patch cards" in 4–6, 499 cards that could previously only be activated using the Nintendo e-Reader in the original release; and "Buster MAX mode", which multiplies MegaMan.EXE's buster attack power by 100 for simpler gameplay. The game's menu features an interactive MegaMan.EXE that reacts to the player's choices, reprised by his MegaMan NT Warrior actors Akiko Kimura in Japanese and Andrew Francis in English.

== Release ==
Battle Network Legacy Collection was announced during a Nintendo Direct livestream on June 28, 2022. Both volumes of the collection were released simultaneously on April 14, 2023 for Nintendo Switch, PlayStation 4, and Windows, making it the only Legacy Collection to not be released on Xbox One. A physical release containing both volumes was also released for Nintendo Switch and PlayStation 4. Players who pre-ordered the game received a downloadable content pack containing two alternate skins for MegaMan.EXE on the menu (one skin per volume), as well as four additional remixed tracks for the game's music player (two tracks per volume); the pre-order content was later made available for purchase on June 27, 2023. To promote the collection, Capcom briefly re-released the MegaMan NT Warrior anime through their video streaming channels.

== Reception ==
Mega Man Battle Network Legacy Collection

Aggregate scores
Aggregator	Score
Metacritic	78/100 (NS); 80/100 (PC); 77/100 (PS4)
OpenCritic	71% recommended

Review scores
Publication	Score
Hardcore Gamer	4/5
Nintendo Life	9/10
Nintendo World Report	7.5/10
PCMag	3.5/5
Shacknews	8/10
TouchArcade	4/5
