= Rockman EXE 4.5 Real Operation =

2004 video game

- Developer: Capcom Production Studio 2
- Publisher: Capcom
- Producer: Keiji Inafune
- Designers: Masahiro Yasuma; Kohei Ozaki
- Artists: Yuji Ishihara; Hayato Kaji
- Writer: Masakazu Eguchi
- Composers: Toshihiko Horiyama; Akari Kaida
- Series: Mega Man Battle Network
- Platform: Game Boy Advance
- Release: JP: August 6, 2004
- Genre: Real-time tactical role-playing game
- Modes: Single-player, multiplayer

Rockman EXE 4.5 Real Operation (ロックマンエグゼ4.5 リアルオペレーション) is a 2004 tactical role-playing game developed by Capcom for the Game Boy Advance (GBA) handheld game console. It is a spin-off title in the Mega Man Battle Network sub-series of Mega Man video games. The game was released in Japan on August 6, 2004, but was not localized or released in other territories.

== Gameplay ==
In Real Operation, the GBA acts as a PET, allowing the player to indirectly control various NetNavis from previous games in the series. The game is compatible with the Battle Chip Gate, a GBA accessory that allows players to use real-life toy Battle Chips in this and future games. Users of Real Operation can also play multiplayer games against Battle Network 4 users and other Real Operation users.

Players select a Navi as their companion at the start of the game. Navis each have unique personality traits, battle styles, and means for growth. Some require mini-games, while others require the player to complete particular tasks for them. Unlike the main Battle Network games, Navis act independently during battle, and the player provides Battle Chips by either selecting them via in-game controls or manually slotting them into the Battle Chip Gate. The player can also alter the Navi's evasion strategies to guide them closer or further from the enemies and set up attacks. This is to simulate an actual NetBattle experience with the player as the NetOperator, and as such, no human characters appear in the game.

The game also features a real-time clock system. Players can set reminders on a calendar tracked by their Navi, and in-game tournaments are held on certain days of the week. Darkloid versions of Navis that appeared in Mega Man Battle Network 4 also appear in cyberspace for the player to battle against.

=== Playable Navis ===
There 21 playable Navis, including all 12 Soul Unison Navis from Mega Man Battle Network 4:

==== Starter Navis ====
- MegaMan
- Roll
- GutsMan
- NumberMan

==== Unlockable Navis ====
The following Navis are unlockable through gameplay or by using their corresponding Battle Chips in the Battle Chip Gate:

- AquaMan
- FireMan
- JunkMan
- MetalMan
- ProtoMan
- SearchMan
- ThunderMan
- WoodMan
- WindMan

==== Battle Chip Gate Navis ====
The following Navis are unlockable only by using their corresponding Battle Chips in the Battle Chip Gate:

- Bass
- ElecMan
- IceMan
- KnightMan
- NapalmMan
- PlantMan
- ShadowMan
- StarMan

== Development ==
Production began immediately after the completion of Battle Network 4 in 2003 and lasted around six months. Since it coincided with the development of Battle Network 5 and the localization of Battle Network 4 (each of which released in two versions), the team has since described this as the most difficult period of development for the Battle Network series.

Real Operation was inspired by the hidden Operation Battle mode in Battle Network 4, which similarly offers indirect control of a NetNavi while using the Battle Chip Gate to send Battle Chips. To build upon the concept and further immerse the player in the world of Battle Network, director Masahiro Yasuma decided to frame the entire game through the PET. This led to the real-time clock, Navi conversations, and the removal of real-world gameplay seen in the rest of the Battle Network series.

=== Music ===
The soundtrack was composed by Toshihiko Horiyama and Akari Kaida, both of whom wrote music for prior Battle Network games. Each Navi has a musical theme, which plays on the PET menu when they are selected, and many of these themes are rearranged from their counterparts in the original Mega Man series.

== Release ==
Rockman EXE 4.5 Real Operation sold approximately 14,693 copies during its first few days on sale in Japan. The game remained on the Famitsu top 30 chart for three weeks. Sales topped out at 75,809 copies by the end of the year.

The game was re-released for the Wii U Virtual console in 2016.

=== Fan Translation ===
On 26 October 2019, The Rockman EXE Zone released an unofficial English translation with custom box art, a complete translated manual and localisations for both Europe and North America.

== Reception ==
Famitsu magazine gave it a score of 33 out of 40.
