= Mega Man Battle Network 3 =

- North American Blue version box art
- Developer: Capcom Production Studio 2
- Publisher: Capcom
- Producer: Keiji Inafune
- Designer: Masahiro Yasuma
- Programmers: Koetsu Matsuda; Hidekazu Shingaki; Michinori Kataoka; Mitsunori Sakano; Hisako Murata
- Artists: Yuji Ishihara; Kyoko Arima; Hayato Kaji
- Writers: Masakazu Eguchi; Go Onishi; Shin Kurosawa
- Composer: Yoshino Aoki
- Series: Mega Man Battle Network
- Platform: Game Boy Advance
- Release: JP: December 6, 2002 (original); JP: March 28, 2003 (Black); NA: June 24, 2003; EU: July 4, 2003
- Genre: Real-time tactical role-playing
- Modes: Single-player, multiplayer

Mega Man Battle Network 3: White Version (Note: Known as Battle Network Rockman EXE 3 (Japanese: バトルネットワーク ロックマンエグゼ3, Hepburn: Batoru Nettowāku Rokkuman Eguze 3)) and Mega Man Battle Network 3: Blue Version are tactical role-playing games developed by Capcom for the Game Boy Advance (GBA) handheld game console. Battle Network 3 is the third game in the Mega Man Battle Network series, released in 2002 in Japan and 2003 in North America. In North America and Europe, two complementary versions of the game — White Version and Blue Version — were released and marketed simultaneously. However, this was not the case in Japan; the game was first released as a single version in this region. However, a subsequent Black Version (Note: Japanese: ブラック, Hepburn: Burakku) containing bug fixes, new areas, optional bosses, and other improvements was released in Japan some months after the original. Mega Man Battle Network 3 was re-released on the Wii U's Virtual Console in Japan on December 17, 2014, and in North America on May 14, 2015. It was also later re-released as part of the Mega Man Battle Network Legacy Collection compilation in 2023.

== Plot ==
The year is 200X. Doctor Wily has returned to reform the evil organization WWW (World Three) and now seeks to release Alpha, a prototype version of the Internet that went berserk after becoming corrupted by bugs and was locked away before the current Net was set up. To release it, Wily needs the passwords, referred to in-game as TetraCodes, to the firewalls Alpha is trapped behind, which are hidden in secret locations.

Meanwhile, a tournament called the N1 Grand Prix is being held, supposedly to determine who is the world's best NetBattler. It is later revealed to be part of the plan for Wily to steal the TetraCodes, and the WWW attacks between rounds.

Lan Hikari and his NetNavi, MegaMan.EXE, fight NetNavis sent by Wily to attempt to defend the TetraCodes from Wily. Still, he manages to retrieve them with the help of Bass.EXE, and uses them to release Alpha. Lan and MegaMan confront Wily immediately after he releases Alpha, and battle Bass. After Bass is defeated, Wily reveals he manipulated Sean Obihiro into forming Gospel and creating the Bass copies as seen in the previous game's events. Alpha then consumes both of them and proceeds to infect the whole of the Net with its coding.

MegaMan battles Alpha, and is able to defeat it. As Alpha begins to delete, the network in the area begins to crash as Alpha attempts to absorb everything to save itself. Unfortunately, this includes MegaMan and Lan. In an attempt to allow Lan to escape, MegaMan overloads, sacrificing his own life to save Lan. Later, Lan's father Doctor Yuichiro Hikari manages to find and recover MegaMan during a salvage operation of the affected network location, and is finally able to revive him.

== Gameplay ==
The gameplay in Battle Network 3 is similar to that of its predecessors, with few graphical enhancements and minor gameplay changes. Battle Network 3 saw the removal of Power-Ups that were collected to improve the MegaBuster — instead the Navi Customizer was added, allowing abilities to be added on with certain rules as to how these abilities can be added with respect to each other.

Each version of the game has a separate Contest Navi: BowlMan for Blue/Black, and MistMan for White. Blue also includes another Navi, Punk, that could be challenged from time to time. Punk's chip was only available as part of a special promotion in Japan. However, it can be attained via a cheat device or by being traded from Black to Blue. White, on the other hand, has no such Navi.

In Battle Network 3, the virus breeder is available, where special, friendly viruses (that must be found first somewhere in the Net) are kept and can be fed using BugFrags. When a virus is found and put in the breeder, a chip for that virus is obtained. Feeding each virus BugFrags levels up their chip accordingly. After a family of a certain type of virus has been fed to the max, they will release information to the player as to where the Omega Virus of that family (i.e. For the KillerEye family, they will give you a clue to find KillerEye Omega) can be found. After the Omega Virus of that family is found and deleted, it will join the others in the Virus Breeder and will be available when the corresponding Virus Chip is used. This is the only Battle Network game that features non-Navi Omega viruses.

Battle Network 3 introduces further classification of Battle Chips by splitting them into three categories: 200 white Standard chips, 85 blue Mega chips and 25 pink Giga chips. Standard Chips are limited to only four of each kind (even if letter codes are different) per folder. Mega Chips are limited to only five per folder, and only one of each kind. Only one Giga Chip is allowed per folder and only one copy of each Giga chip exists throughout the entire game. These specifications would continue for the remainder of the series. There are certain types of programs (see Navi Customizer) that can boost the Mega and Giga chip limits, though. There are five unique Giga chips exclusive to each version and this would continue for the remainder of the series, although Battle Network 5 offers six Giga chips per version. There are also Program advances which are a combination of three or four chips.

=== Multiplayer ===
Multiplayer is accessible from the Comm option on the Main Menu. Multiplayer, also called "NetBattling", allows two players to fight head to head with their respective MegaMan.EXEs (this includes style-changes and health, as well as Navi customizer stats). When entering the Multiplayer screen, the player can choose from NetBattling, Trading Chips, and Comparing Libraries.

By choosing the NetBattling option from the Comm menu, a player is given two options again, Practice and Real. Practice allows two players to battle with no risk of losing chips, and does not count against a player's Win/Loss record. In Real, matches count for win–loss records and the losing player in a NetBattle forfeits a chip randomly chosen from their chip pack. There is a special Giga-Chip that is attained in this fashion (DeltaRayEdge Z for Blue, Balance Y for White), which has a 1/32 chance of occurring instead of the winning player acquiring the other player's chip. For these chips to be attained, both players must have at least one star and must be battling in midweight or heavyweight, real. After choosing Practice/Real, players can choose Lightweight, Midweight, and Heavyweight. Lightweight allows players to battle on a level field, with no negative panels on either side. Midweight may give certain obstacles on either player's side of the field, such as RockCubes and plain Rocks. Panels may also be cracked or broken. Heavyweight is guaranteed to have negative panels on both sides, and some matches contain rapidly replenishing Guardians, which deal 200 damage (400 on ice or to aqua style, 800 to an aqua style on ice) to a player who hits them.

Players can also trade Battle Chips with other players. No Giga Chip can be traded. Trading is required to attain all seven stars in the game, due to the lack of MistMan in Blue and BowlMan in White. The "Comparing Libraries" option scans both players' libraries. If one player has a Battle Chip that the other player does not, the other player shall attain a blank spot in the library that represents that chip. From here, the player can buy that Chip from Higsby's shop in ACDC Town after the defeat of BeastMan; using the Order System. Giga Chips cannot be bought from Higsby's Shop.

== Reception ==
Reception

Aggregate scores
Aggregator	Score
GameRankings	76.46% (Blue); 77.91% (White)
Metacritic	77/100 (Blue); 76/100 (White)

Review scores
Publication	Score
Electronic Gaming Monthly	7.5/10
Famitsu	9/10, 9/10, 8/10, 8/10
Game Informer	8/10
GamePro	3/5
GameSpot	8.5/10
GameSpy	4/5
IGN	7.9/10
Nintendo Power	7/10

Mega Man Battle Network 3 performed well commercially in Japan. The original version, released on December 6, 2002, was the second best-selling video game in the region during its release week at 91,351 units according to Famitsu. The game appeared within the Famitsu top 30 best-sellers list for twelve weeks following its release with 461,426 units sold by March 16, 2003. The game's updated Black version, released in Japan on March 28, 2003, was the 11th best-selling video game in the region during its release week at 28,708 units sold. It also appeared the Famitsu top 30 best-sellers list for the four following weeks with sales of 73,964 units by April 27, 2003. By the end of 2003, the original version had sold 500,001 units and the Black version had sold 168,946 units in Japan alone.
