= List of Mega Man video games =

There are over 130 titles in the Mega Man series. In all cases, the English title is given first, along with the initial release date.

== Mega Man series ==
Mega Man
- Genres: Action; Action-adventure; Hack 'n slash; Platformer; Third-person shooter; Role-playing
- Developers: Capcom; Inti Creates (2002–2010)
- Publishers: Capcom; Nintendo (1990–1994)
- Platform: Various: Arcade; Android; Game Boy; Game Boy Advance; Game Boy Color; GameCube; Game Gear; iOS; Mobile phones; Neo Geo Pocket; Neo Geo Pocket Color; Nintendo 3DS; Nintendo 64; Nintendo DS; NES; Nintendo Switch; Nintendo Switch 2; PlayChoice-10; PlayStation; PlayStation 2; PlayStation 3; PlayStation 4; PlayStation 5; PlayStation Portable; PlayStation Vita; Sega Genesis; Sega Saturn; Super NES; SteamOS; Shield Portable; Shield Tablet; Shield Android TV; Wii; Wii U; Windows; WonderSwan; Xbox; Xbox 360; Xbox One; Xbox Series X/S; Xperia Play
- First release: Mega Man; December 17, 1987
- Latest release: Mega Man Star Force Legacy Collection; March 27, 2026
- Spin-offs: Mega Man X; Mega Man Legends; Mega Man Battle Network; Mega Man Zero; Mega Man ZX; Mega Man Star Force

Release timeline
1987	Mega Man
1988	Mega Man 2
1989
1990	Mega Man 3
1991	Mega Man: Dr. Wily's Revenge
1991	Mega Man 4
1991	Mega Man II
1992	Mega Man 5
1992	Mega Man III
1993	Mega Man IV
1993	Mega Man 6
1994	Mega Man V
1994	Mega Man: The Wily Wars
1995	Mega Man 7
1996	Mega Man 8
1997
1998	Mega Man & Bass
1999–2003
2004	Mega Man Anniversary Collection
2005
2006	Mega Man Powered Up
2007
2008	Mega Man 9
2009
2010	Mega Man 10
2011
2012	Street Fighter X Mega Man
2013–2014
2015	Mega Man Legacy Collection
2016
2017	Mega Man Legacy Collection 2
2018	Mega Man 11
2019–2026
2027	Mega Man: Dual Override

=== Main series ===
Game	Details
Mega Man Original release dates: JP: December 17, 1987; NA: December 1987; EU: December 13, 1989	Release years by system: 1987 – Famicom/NES; 1999 – PlayStation; 2008 – Wii; 2012 – 3DS; 2013 – Wii U 2017 – Android/iOS
Mega Man Original release dates: JP: December 17, 1987; NA: December 1987; EU: December 13, 1989	Notes: Known as Rockman in Japan; Ported to the PlayStation in 1999 under the Rockman Complete Works series; Included in the Mega Man Anniversary Collection and Mega Man Legacy Collection; Released digitally under the Virtual Console branding on Wii, Wii U, and 3DS
Mega Man 2 Original release dates: JP: December 24, 1988; NA: June 1989; EU: January 1991	Release years by system: 1988 – Famicom/NES; 1999 – PlayStation; 2008 – Wii; 2013 – Nintendo 3DS, Wii U 2017 – Android/iOS
Mega Man 2 Original release dates: JP: December 24, 1988; NA: June 1989; EU: January 1991	Notes: Known as Rockman 2: Dr. Wily no Nazo in Japan; Ported to the PlayStation in 1999 under the Rockman Complete Works series; Included in the Mega Man Anniversary Collection and Mega Man Legacy Collection; Released digitally under the Virtual Console branding on Wii, Wii U, and 3DS
Mega Man 3 Original release dates: JP: September 28, 1990; NA: November 1990; EU: June 23rd, 1992	Release years by system: 1990 – Famicom/NES; 1999 – PlayStation; 2008 – Wii; 2013 – Nintendo 3DS, Wii U 2017 – Android/iOS
Mega Man 3 Original release dates: JP: September 28, 1990; NA: November 1990; EU: June 23rd, 1992	Notes: Known as Rockman 3: Dr. Wily no Saigo!? in Japan; Ported to the PlayStation in 1999 under the Rockman Complete Works series; Included in the Mega Man Anniversary Collection and Mega Man Legacy Collection; Released digitally under the Virtual Console branding on Wii, Wii U, and 3DS
Mega Man 4 Original release dates: JP: December 6th, 1991; NA: January 1992; EU: August 1993	Release years by system: 1991 – Famicom/NES; 1999 – PlayStation; 2010 – Wii; 2013 – Nintendo 3DS, Wii U 2017 – Android/iOS
Mega Man 4 Original release dates: JP: December 6th, 1991; NA: January 1992; EU: August 1993	Notes: Known as Rockman 4: Aratanaru Yabou!! in Japan; Ported to the PlayStation in 1999 under the Rockman Complete Works series; Included in the Mega Man Anniversary Collection and Mega Man Legacy Collection; Released digitally under the Virtual Console branding on Wii, Wii U, and 3DS
Mega Man 5 Original release dates: JP: December 4th, 1992; NA: December 1992; EU: March 10th, 1993	Release years by system: 1992 – Famicom/NES; 1999 – PlayStation; 2011 – Wii; 2013 – Nintendo 3DS; 2014 – Wii U 2017 – Android/iOS
Mega Man 5 Original release dates: JP: December 4th, 1992; NA: December 1992; EU: March 10th, 1993	Notes: Known as Rockman 5: Blues no Wana!? in Japan; Ported to the PlayStation in 1999 under the Rockman Complete Works series; Included in the Mega Man Anniversary Collection and Mega Man Legacy Collection; Released digitally under the Virtual Console branding on Wii, Wii U, and 3DS
Mega Man 6 Original release dates: JP: November 5th, 1993; NA: March 1994	Release years by system: 1993 – Famicom/NES; 1999 – PlayStation; 2013 – Nintendo 3DS; 2014 – Wii U 2017 – Android/iOS
Mega Man 6 Original release dates: JP: November 5th, 1993; NA: March 1994	Notes: Known as Rockman 6: Shijō Saidai no Tatakai!! in Japan; Published by Nintendo in North America instead of Capcom; Ported to the PlayStation in 1999 under the Rockman Complete Works series; Included in the Mega Man Anniversary Collection and Mega Man Legacy Collection; Released digitally under the Virtual Console branding on Wii U and 3DS
Mega Man 7 Original release dates: JP: March 24th, 1995; NA: September 1995; EU: 1995	Release years by system: 1995 – Super Famicom/Super NES; 2014 – Wii U 2016 – New Nintendo 3DS
Mega Man 7 Original release dates: JP: March 24th, 1995; NA: September 1995; EU: 1995	Notes: Known as Rockman 7: Shukumei no Taiketsu! in Japan; Included in the Mega Man Anniversary Collection and Mega Man Legacy Collection 2; Released digitally under the Virtual Console branding on Wii U and New Nintendo 3DS systems
Mega Man 8 Original release dates: JP: December 17th, 1996; NA: March 1997; EU: October 1997	Release years by system: 1996 – PlayStation; 1997 – Sega Saturn; 2015 – PlayStation Portable, PlayStation 3, PlayStation Vita
Mega Man 8 Original release dates: JP: December 17th, 1996; NA: March 1997; EU: October 1997	Notes: Known as Rockman 8: Metal Heroes in Japan; Included in the Mega Man Anniversary Collection and Mega Man Legacy Collection 2; Released digitally under the PSone Classics line for PlayStation Portable, PlayStation 3, and PlayStation Vita
Mega Man & Bass Original release dates: JP: April 24th, 1998; NA: March 11th, 2003; EU: March 21st, 2003	Release years by system: 1998 – Super Famicom; 2002 – Game Boy Advance; 2015 – Wii U
Mega Man & Bass Original release dates: JP: April 24th, 1998; NA: March 11th, 2003; EU: March 21st, 2003	Notes: Known as Rockman & Forte in Japan; Super Famicom version exclusive to Japan; Game Boy Advance version rereleased digitally under the Virtual Console branding on Wii U.
Mega Man 9 Original release dates: NA: September 22nd, 2008; JP: September 24th, 2008; EU: September 26th, 2008	Release years by system: 2008 – Xbox 360, PlayStation 3, Wii
Mega Man 9 Original release dates: NA: September 22nd, 2008; JP: September 24th, 2008; EU: September 26th, 2008	Notes: Known as Rockman 9: Yabou no Fukkatsu!! in Japan; Included in Mega Man Legacy Collection 2
Mega Man 10 Original release dates: NA: March 1st, 2010; EU: March 5th, 2010; JP: March 9th, 2010	Release years by system: 2010 – Xbox 360, PlayStation 3, Wii
Mega Man 10 Original release dates: NA: March 1st, 2010; EU: March 5th, 2010; JP: March 9th, 2010	Notes: Known as Rockman 10: Uchū kara no Kyōi!! in Japan; Included in Mega Man Legacy Collection 2
Mega Man 11 Original release dates: WW: October 2nd, 2018; JP: October 4th, 2018	Release years by system: 2018 – PlayStation 4, Xbox One, Nintendo Switch, Microsoft Windows
Mega Man 11 Original release dates: WW: October 2nd, 2018; JP: October 4th, 2018	Notes: Known as Rockman 11: Unmei no Haguruma!! in Japan
Mega Man: Dual Override Original release dates: WW: 2027	Release years by system: 2027 – PlayStation 4, Xbox One, Nintendo Switch, PlayStation 5, Xbox Series X/S, Nintendo Switch 2, Microsoft Windows
Mega Man: Dual Override Original release dates: WW: 2027	Notes: Known as Rockman: Dual Override in Japan; Upcoming release

=== Game Boy versions ===
The Game Boy versions of Mega Man were originally released in Japan under the Rockman World title. All Game Boy titles have an original plot. Each game in the Game Boy series, excluding Mega Man V, features four bosses from its corresponding NES version and four bosses from the succeeding NES game in the series. I.e: the Game Boy version of Mega Man III features bosses from the NES versions of Mega Man 3 and Mega Man 4. The Game Boy Mega Man V features an all new set of antagonists called the Star Droids, whose members are named after the planets of the Solar System.

- Mega Man: Dr. Wily's Revenge (Rockman World) – Game Boy, 1991 – A handheld remake of Mega Man 1 and Mega Man 2.
- Mega Man II (Rockman World 2) – Game Boy, 1991 – A handheld remake of Mega Man 2 and Mega Man 3.
- Mega Man III (Rockman World 3) – Game Boy, 1992 – A handheld remake of Mega Man 3 and Mega Man 4.
- Mega Man IV (Rockman World 4) – Game Boy, 1993 – A handheld remake of Mega Man 4 and Mega Man 5.
- Mega Man V (Rockman World 5) – Game Boy, 1994 (had additional Super Game Boy support)

=== Spin-off titles ===
- Street Fighter X Mega Man (Street Fighter X Rockman) – PC, 2012

Street Fighter X Mega Man is a project developed by Zong Hui, combining Mega Man's gameplay with characters and settings from the Street Fighter series. Initially developed as a fan game by Hui, Capcom funded the project and provided creative direction and QA support. The game has been released as a free download on December 17, 2012.

Sports games:

- Mega Man Soccer (Rockman's Soccer) (Japan/North America only) – Super Famicom/Super NES, 1994
- Mega Man: Battle & Chase (Rockman: Battle & Chase) (Japan/Europe only until Mega Man X Collection) – PlayStation, 1997

Fighting games:

- Mega Man: The Power Battle (Rockman: The Power Battle) – Arcade, 1995
- Mega Man 2: The Power Fighters (Rockman 2: The Power Fighters) – Arcade, 1996

Other:

- Panic Shot! Rockman (Japan only) – pinball machine, 1992
- Wily & Right no RockBoard: That's Paradise (Japan only) – Famicom, 1993
- Super Adventure Rockman (Japan only) – PlayStation/Sega Saturn, 1998
- Pachislot Rockman Ability (Japan only) – pachislot, 2018

=== Re-releases and collections ===
Re-releases/Remakes:

- Mega Man (North America only) – Game Gear, 1995 – A handheld remake of Mega Man 4 and Mega Man 5.
- Mega Man Powered Up (Rockman Rockman) – PlayStation Portable, 2006 – An enhanced remake of the original Mega Man, which adds, among other things, two new boss characters.

Collections:

- Mega Man: The Wily Wars (Rockman Mega World) – Mega Drive/Sega Channel for Sega Genesis, 1994 – A collection of enhanced remakes of the first three Famicom/NES games, as well as its own game, Wily Tower.
- Rockman Complete Works (Japan only) – PlayStation, 1999 – Enhanced remakes of Rockman 1-6, released individually. The remakes contain special features, including a PocketStation uplink, a Robot Master database, an "easy" difficulty level, and remixed music. The Complete Works titles were re-released in 2003 with the PocketStation feature removed.
- Rockman Collection Special Box (Japan only) – PlayStation 2, 2003 – A collection of the six Rockman Complete Works games and Rockman X7.
- Mega Man Anniversary Collection (North America only) – GameCube/PlayStation 2/Xbox, 2004 – An English-language release of the Rockman Complete Works games (albeit with most of the special features removed), together with ports of Mega Man 7 and Mega Man 8 and the two arcade games.
- Mega Man Legacy Collection (Rockman Classics Collection) – PlayStation 4/Xbox One/Microsoft Windows/Nintendo 3DS, 2015 – A collection of the first six Mega Man titles.
- Mega Man Legacy Collection 2 (Rockman Classics Collection 2) – PlayStation 4/Xbox One/Microsoft Windows, 2017 – A collection including Mega Man 7-10 and all their downloadable content.

Fighting games collections:

- Rockman Battle & Fighters (Japan only) – Neo Geo Pocket Color, 2000 – A handheld port of Mega Man: The Power Battle and Mega Man 2: The Power Fighters.
- Rockman: Power Battle Fighters (Japan only) – PlayStation 2, 2004 – A Japan-only port of the two arcade games, Mega Man: The Power Battle and Mega Man 2: The Power Fighters.

=== Mobile phone games ===
Capcom of Japan has released several Rockman games for mobile phones in Japan. Only the first two games, Rockman Space Rescue and Mega Man Rocket Christmas were ported for international cell phones; on the other hand, Mega Man Rush Marine was created specifically for international audiences. In 2017, Capcom released ports of the first six NES Mega Man games to iOS and Android devices.

- Mega Man, 2003
- Mega Man 2, 2007
- Mega Man 3, 2008
- Rockman 3 Dr. Wily no Saigo!?, 2004
- Rockman 4 Arata Naru Yabō!!, 2005
- Rockman 5 Blues no Wana?!, 2006
- Rockman 6 Shijō Saidai no Tatakai!!, 2007
- Jump! Rockman, 2004
- Rockman Bug Sweeper, 2003
- Rockman Panic Fire, 2003
- Rockman Space Rescue, 2003
- Mega Man Rocket Christmas, 2003
- Rockman Slot, 2003
- Rockman GP, 2004
- Rockman Pinball, 2004
- Rockman DASH Golf, 2003
- Rockman DASH 15 Panel, 2002
- Kobun Flies?, 2001
- Tide Coming Kobun, 2001
- Kobun Assembly, 2001
- Watch Kobun, 2001
- Rockman.EXE: Phantom of Network, 2004
- Rockman.EXE: Legend of Network, 2006
- Rockman X, 2007
- Rockman DASH - Grand 5 Island Adventure, 2008
- Rockman X2, 2009
- Rockman X3, 2010
- Rockman Tennis, 2010
- Mega Man Rush Marine, 2010
- Intuition! Rockman, 2010
- Rockman Diver, 2011
- Rockman the Puzzle Battle, 2011
- Rockman´s Sprite Logic, 2011
- Rockman Xover (Japan only) – iOS, 2012 (servers closed on March 31, 2015)
- Otoranger, 2013
- Mega Man Mobile, 2017
- Mega Man Mobile 2, 2017
- Mega Man Mobile 3, 2017
- Mega Man Mobile 4, 2017
- Mega Man Mobile 5, 2017
- Mega Man Mobile 6, 2017

=== Licensed games ===
- Mega Man (North America only) – PC, 1990
- Mega Man III (North America only) – PC, 1992
- Rockman & Forte Mirai kara no Chōsensha (Japan only) – WonderSwan, 1999
- Rockman Gold Empire (China only) – PC, 1999
- Rockman Strategy (Taiwan only) – PC, 2001

In 1990, Hi-Tech Expressions (under license from Capcom) produced a DOS game based on the series simply titled Mega Man. It was followed by a second DOS game titled Mega Man III in 1992. Both games were released exclusively in North America. Despite their titles, neither games are ports of their corresponding NES counterparts, but original games. There was no PC game titled Mega Man II. Aside from handing the license to Hi-Tech Expressions, Capcom themselves were not directly involved in the PC games. Both games were programmed and designed by Stephen Rozner.

In 1999, Chinese developer Strawberry Soft created a game very similar to Wily & Right no RockBoard: That's Paradise called Rockman Gold Empire.

In 2001, the Dreams Comes True corporation released under license from Capcom an original Microsoft Windows game titled Rockman Strategy exclusively for the Taiwanese market. The game features a group of new robots led by Apollo and Luna and named after the western Zodiac as well as a new ally named Fan, with the former being tricked into serving Dr. Wily.

== Mega Man X series ==
Release timeline
1993	Mega Man X
1994	Mega Man X2
1995	Mega Man X3
1996
1997	Mega Man X4
1998–1999
2000	Mega Man Xtreme
2000	Mega Man X5
2001	Mega Man Xtreme 2
2001	Mega Man X6
2002
2003	Mega Man X7
2004	Mega Man X: Command Mission
2004	Mega Man X8
2005	Mega Man Maverick Hunter X
2005	Mega Man X Collection
2006–2017
2018	Mega Man X Legacy Collection
2018	Mega Man X Legacy Collection 2
2019
2020	Mega Man X Dive

- Mega Man X (Rockman X) – Super Famicom/Super NES, PC, Virtual Console, 1993
- Mega Man X2 (Rockman X2) – Super Famicom/Super NES, Virtual Console, 1994
- Mega Man X3 (Rockman X3) – Super Famicom/Super NES, PC, PlayStation, Sega Saturn, Virtual Console, 1995, 1996
- Mega Man X4 (Rockman X4) – PlayStation, Sega Saturn, PC, 1997
- Mega Man X5 (Rockman X5) – PlayStation, PC, 2000
- Mega Man X6 (Rockman X6) – PlayStation, PC (South Korea only), 2001
- Mega Man X7 (Rockman X7) – PlayStation 2, PC (Asia only), 2003
- Mega Man X8 (Rockman X8) – PlayStation 2, PC, 2004

=== Spin-offs ===
- Mega Man Xtreme (Rockman X: Cyber Mission) – Game Boy Color, 2000
- Mega Man Xtreme 2 (Rockman X2: Soul Eraser) – Game Boy Color, 2001
- Mega Man X: Command Mission (Rockman X: Command Mission) – GameCube, PlayStation 2, 2004
- Mega Man X Dive (Rockman X DiVE) – iOS, Android, Windows, 2020, 2021

=== Re-releases and collections ===
- Rockman Collection Special Box (Japan only) – PlayStation 2, 2003 – A collection of the six Rockman Complete Works games and Rockman X7.
- Mega Man X Collection (North America only) – GameCube, PlayStation 2, 2005/2006 – A collection featuring the first six Mega Man X titles and Mega Man Battle & Chase.
- Mega Man Maverick Hunter X (Irregular Hunter X) – PlayStation Portable, 2005 – A remake of the original Mega Man X.
- Mega Man X Legacy Collection (Rockman X Anniversary Collection) – PlayStation 4/Xbox One/Nintendo Switch/Microsoft Windows, 2018 – A collection including Mega Man X-X4.
- Mega Man X Legacy Collection 2 (Rockman X Anniversary Collection 2) – PlayStation 4/Xbox One/Nintendo Switch/Microsoft Windows, 2018 – A collection including Mega Man X5-X8.

== Mega Man Zero series ==
Release timeline
2002	Mega Man Zero
2003	Mega Man Zero 2
2004	Mega Man Zero 3
2005	Mega Man Zero 4
2006–2009
2010	Mega Man Zero Collection
2011–2019
2020	Mega Man Zero/ZX Legacy Collection

- Mega Man Zero (Rockman Zero) – Game Boy Advance, 2002
- Mega Man Zero 2 (Rockman Zero 2) – Game Boy Advance, 2003
- Mega Man Zero 3 (Rockman Zero 3) – Game Boy Advance, 2004
- Mega Man Zero 4 (Rockman Zero 4) – Game Boy Advance, 2005

=== Collections ===
- Mega Man Zero Collection (Rockman Zero Collection) – Nintendo DS, 2010 – A collection of all four Zero games
- Mega Man Zero/ZX Legacy Collection (Rockman Zero & ZX Double Hero Collection) – PlayStation 4/Xbox One/Nintendo Switch/Microsoft Windows, 2020 – A collection of all four Zero games and both ZX games

== Mega Man ZX series ==
Release timeline
2006	Mega Man ZX
2007	Mega Man ZX Advent
2008–2019
2020	Mega Man Zero/ZX Legacy Collection

- Mega Man ZX (Rockman ZX) – Nintendo DS, 2006
- Mega Man ZX Advent (Rockman ZX Advent) – Nintendo DS, 2007

=== Collections ===
- Mega Man Zero/ZX Legacy Collection (Rockman Zero & ZX Double Hero Collection) – PlayStation 4/Xbox One/Nintendo Switch/Microsoft Windows, 2020 – A collection of all four Zero games and both ZX games

== Mega Man Legends series ==
Release timeline
1997	Mega Man Legends
1998
1999	The Misadventures of Tron Bonne
2000	Mega Man Legends 2

- Mega Man Legends / Mega Man 64 (Rockman Dash - Episode 1: Hagane no Bōkenshin) – PlayStation, Nintendo 64, PC, PlayStation Portable (Japan only), 1997, 1998
- The Misadventures of Tron Bonne (Tron ni Kobun) – PlayStation, 1999, 2000 - a prequel set before the events of the original Mega Man Legends.
- Mega Man Legends 2 (Rockman Dash 2 - Episode 2: Ōinaru Isan) – PlayStation, PC, PlayStation Portable (Japan only) 2000
- Rockman DASH Zhěngjiù Dìqiú Dà Màoxiǎn (Taiwan only) – PC, 1999
- Rockman DASH - 5tsu no Shima no Daibouken! (Japan only) – Cell Phone, 2008

== Mega Man Battle Network series ==
Release timeline
2001	Mega Man Battle Network
2001	Mega Man Battle Network 2
2002	Mega Man Battle Network 3 Blue/White
2003	Rockman EXE WS
2003	Mega Man Network Transmission
2003	Mega Man Battle Chip Challenge
2003	Rockman EXE N1 Battle
2003	Mega Man Battle Network 4 Red Sun/Blue Moon
2004	Rockman EXE 4.5 Real Operation
2004	Mega Man Battle Network 5 Team Protoman/Team Colonel
2005	Mega Man Battle Network 5 Double Team DS
2005	Mega Man Battle Network 6 Cybeast Gregar/Cybeast Falzar
2006–2008
2009	Rockman EXE Operate Shooting Star
2010–2022
2023	Mega Man Battle Network Legacy Collection

- Mega Man Battle Network (Battle Network Rockman EXE) – Game Boy Advance, 2001
- Mega Man Battle Network 2 (Battle Network Rockman EXE 2) – Game Boy Advance, 2001
- Mega Man Battle Network 3 Blue & White (Battle Network Rockman EXE 3) – Game Boy Advance, 2002, 2003
- Mega Man Battle Network 4 Red Sun & Blue Moon (Rockman EXE 4: Tournament Red Sun & Tournament Blue Moon) – Game Boy Advance, 2003
- Mega Man Battle Network 5 Team Protoman & Team Colonel (Rockman EXE 5: Team of Blues & Team of Colonel) – Game Boy Advance, 2004, 2005
- Mega Man Battle Network 5: Double Team DS (Rockman EXE 5 DS: Twin Leaders) – Nintendo DS, 2005
- Mega Man Battle Network 6 Cybeast Gregar & Cybeast Falzar (Rockman EXE 6: Dennōjū Gregar & Dennōjū Falzar) – Game Boy Advance, 2005

=== Spin-offs ===
Role-playing video games:

- Rockman EXE Phantom of Network (Japan only) – Cell Phone, 2004
- Rockman EXE The Medal Operation (Japan only) – Arcade, 2005
- Rockman EXE Legend of Network (Japan only) – Cell Phone, 2006
- Rockman EXE Operate Shooting Star (Japan only) – Nintendo DS, 2009 – An enhanced port of the first Mega Man Battle Network which included a crossover scenario with the Mega Man Star Force series characters.

Platform games:

- Mega Man Network Transmission (Rockman EXE Transmission) – GameCube, 2003
- Rockman EXE WS (Japan only) – WonderSwan Color, 2003

Battle games:

- Mega Man Battle Chip Challenge (Rockman EXE Battle Chip GP) – Game Boy Advance, 2003
- Rockman EXE N1 Battle (Japan only) – WonderSwan Color, 2003
- Rockman EXE 4.5 Real Operation (Japan only) – Game Boy Advance, 2004
- Rockman EXE Battle Chip Stadium (Japan only) – Arcade, 2005

=== Collections ===
- Mega Man Battle Network Legacy Collection (Rockman.EXE Advanced Collection) – PlayStation 4/Nintendo Switch/Microsoft Windows, 2023 – A collection of all ten versions of all six main Battle Network games

== Mega Man Star Force series ==
Release timeline
2006	Mega Man Star Force Pegasus/Leo/Dragon
2007	Mega Man Star Force 2 Zerker x Ninja/Zerker x Saurian
2008	Mega Man Star Force 3 Black Ace/Red Joker
2009	Rockman EXE Operate Shooting Star
2010–2025
2026	Mega Man Star Force Legacy Collection

- Mega Man Star Force: Pegasus, Leo & Dragon (Ryūsei no Rockman: Pegasus, Leo & Dragon) – Nintendo DS, 2006
- Mega Man Star Force 2: Zerker × Ninja & Zerker × Saurian (Ryūsei no Rockman 2: Berserk × Shinobi & Berserk × Dinosaur) – Nintendo DS, 2007
- Mega Man Star Force 3: Black Ace & Red Joker (Ryūsei no Rockman 3: Black Ace & Red Joker) (Japan/North America only) – Nintendo DS, 2008

=== Spin-offs ===
- Rockman EXE Operate Shooting Star (Japan only) – Nintendo DS, 2009 – An enhanced port of the first Mega Man Battle Network which included a crossover scenario with the Mega Man Star Force series characters.

=== Collections ===
- Mega Man Star Force Legacy Collection (Ryūsei no Rockman Perfect Collection) – PlayStation 4/PlayStation 5/Xbox One/Xbox Series X/S/Nintendo Switch/Microsoft Windows, 2026 – A collection of all seven versions of all three Star Force games

== Cancelled games ==
- Wily & Right no RockBoard: That's Paradise – Game Boy, cancelled 1994
- Mega Man X3 (Rockman X3) – 3DO Interactive Multiplayer, cancelled in 1996
- Mega Man Anniversary Collection – Game Boy Advance, cancelled January 2006
- Mega Man ZXC – unknown platforms, cancelled around 2008
- Mega Man Star Force 4 – Nintendo DS, cancelled between 2009 and 2010
- Maverick Hunter – unknown platforms, cancelled late 2010
- Mega Man Universe – Xbox 360 and PlayStation 3, cancelled March 2011
- Mega Man Legends 3 (Rockman DASH 3) – Nintendo 3DS, cancelled July 2011
- Rockman Online – PC massively multiplayer online game, cancelled November 2012
