= Mega Man Legacy Collection =

Mega Man Legacy Collection 1 & 2
- Cover art for the first Mega Man Legacy Collection
- Developers: Digital Eclipse (MMLC); Capcom (MMLC2)
- Publisher: Capcom
- Directors: Mike Evans (MMLC); Jun Koike (MMLC2)
- Producers: Laura Jacob (MMLC); Frank Cifaldi (MMLC); Kazuhiro Tsuchiya (MMLC2); Tomohiro Saito (MMLC2); Daizo Nonaka (MMLC2)
- Designer: Frank Cifaldi (MMLC)
- Series: Mega Man
- Platforms: Nintendo 3DS (MMLC), Nintendo Switch, PlayStation 4, Windows, Xbox One
- Release: Legacy Collection: WW: August 25, 2015; JP: May 26, 2016; Legacy Collection (3DS): WW: February 23, 2016; JP: February 25, 2016; Legacy Collection 2: WW: August 8, 2017; Nintendo Switch: WW: May 22, 2018; JP: May 24, 2018
- Genres: Action, platform
- Mode: Single-player

Mega Man Legacy Collection (Note: Japanese: ロックマン クラシックス コレクション, Hepburn: Rokkuman Kurashikkusu Korekushon; lit. Rockman Classics Collection) is a pair of video game compilations based on Capcom's Mega Man series. The two volumes compile emulated versions of the first ten numbered entries in the Mega Man "Classic" series, originally released between 1987 and 2010. The compilation also adds various enhancements and includes behind-the-scenes materials.

The original Mega Man Legacy Collection was developed by Digital Eclipse and released in 2015, while the second volume, titled Mega Man Legacy Collection 2, was developed internally at Capcom and released in 2017. Both compilations were released for PlayStation 4, Windows, and Xbox One, while the first volume was also released on Nintendo 3DS. Ports for Nintendo Switch were subsequently released in 2018. The success of the compilation led Capcom to develop Legacy Collection releases of other Mega Man spinoff series, including Mega Man X Legacy Collection (2018), Mega Man Zero/ZX Legacy Collection (2020), Mega Man Battle Network Legacy Collection (2023), and Mega Man Star Force Legacy Collection (2026).

== Overview ==
Mega Man fighting the Yellow Devil in one of the Challenges from Mega Man (1987)

The first Legacy Collection focuses on the series' initial entries for the NES: Mega Man (1987), Mega Man 2 (1988), Mega Man 3 (1990), Mega Man 4 (1991), Mega Man 5 (1992), and Mega Man 6 (1993). Legacy Collection 2 compiles the later mainline entries: the SNES game Mega Man 7 (1995), the PlayStation game Mega Man 8 (1996), and the Wii games Mega Man 9 (2008) and Mega Man 10 (2010). Legacy Collection 2 also includes all of the downloadable content released for Mega Man 9 and 10, which can be unlocked by completing each game or inputting a secret code on each game's title screen.

Players can choose between playing the Japanese "Rockman" versions and the international "Mega Man" versions of each game. Both collections feature a "Museum" mode that includes galleries of concept art, sprite sheets, and production images, as well as a music player for all the music tracks in the game. The Nintendo 3DS and Switch versions of the first collection feature an additional Museum section for the gallery known as "Antiques" that is not present in the other versions, which includes over 200 additional images, such as scans of original box art and pages of the Japanese version of the instruction manuals. A "Challenges" mode offers over fifty time-based missions for players to attempt, such as completing a certain goal within a stage or defeating multiple bosses. Several Challenges are divided into sections of levels from the included games, which contain portals for Mega Man to travel through to reach the end, with all of his weapons being unlocked from the start. Eleven additional challenges can be unlocked in the 3DS and Switch compilations by using a Mega Man Amiibo. Cheat sheets on the optimal order to defeat the Robot Masters are added as a bonus feature in Mega Man Legacy Collection, but are not included in its sequel. An "Extra Armor" feature was added in Legacy Collection 2 that reduces the damage players take by half. Legacy Collection also includes a Database mode similar to that of the earlier Rockman Complete Works releases, which lists character profiles. By highlighting a specific Robot Master in the Database (Legacy Collection) or Gallery (Legacy Collection 2), players can play a practice battle against that Robot Master. The Switch version of Legacy Collection includes a gameplay rewind feature to further assist novice players, which was later added to previous releases via a free update, excluding the 3DS version.

== Development ==
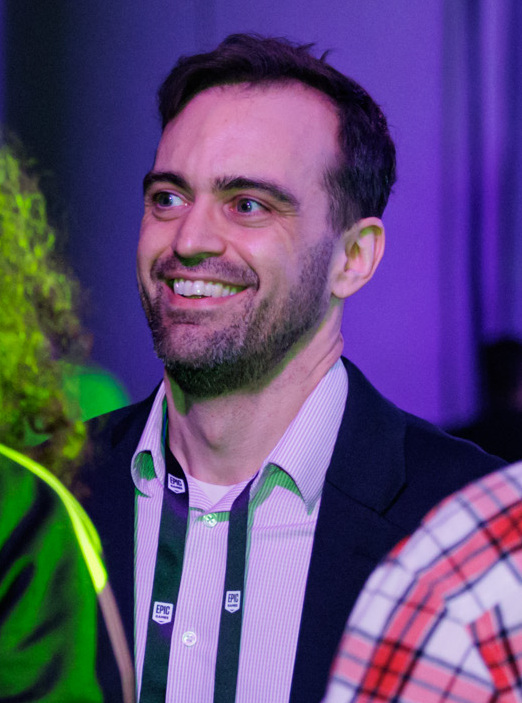
Frank Cifaldi in 2023, producer, designer, and head of restoration for Mega Man Legacy Collection

On June 8, 2015, Digital Eclipse was reformed after being acquired by Other Ocean Group. One of its co-founders, Frank Cifaldi, was named the company's "Head of Restoration", focusing on video game preservation. Mega Man Legacy Collection was the first title Digital Eclipse developed after reforming as a proof of concept for future video game collections. When searching through Capcom's game library, developers decided that Mega Man would serve as the best IP for their first collection. Frank Cifaldi compared the efforts of Digital Eclipse to The Criterion Collection, providing an easier method for preserving video games similar to how Criterion preserves movies. Additionally, Cifaldi wanted Mega Man Legacy Collection to be a celebration of the NES games, not just a collection of ROMs. It is the first Digital Eclipse game designed for the Eclipse Engine, a new engine created by Mike Mika and Kevin Wilson, branched off from Other Ocean's "Bakesale engine". The Eclipse Engine decompiles the source code of games and converts them to a format readable by the engine. The engine was created with portability in mind, allowing the engine itself to be ported to other platforms easily, as ports would usually require developers to start the process over. As described by Cifaldi, "all the basic processes are easily portable, so the idea is once you have something running on it, it should run wherever Eclipse is". While the engine supports video game emulation, the goal for Mega Man Legacy Collection was "extreme accuracy without going the traditional emulator route".

All six Mega Man games that were included are emulated to play exactly as they would on original hardware, including the screen flickering and slowdown effects from the NES. Screen flickering effects that were programmed into the games were kept, whereas the screen flickering effects caused by hardware limitations were removed. Focus was placed on the original six Mega Man games in particular as opposed to including all numbered entries in the series, such as what Mega Man Anniversary Collection did at the time of its release. The inclusion of concept artwork and other unreleased material was granted by Capcom, since they previously released an art book for the Mega Man series in celebration of its 25th anniversary. The Challenges mode, which incorporates sections of levels from the included games, was designed as a mode for speedrunners. It was also created to provide fans with the opportunity to play a variety of Mega Man levels they wouldn't usually experience multiple times. One of the Challenges, "Craig's Challenge", was designed by and named after Craig Skistimas from YouTube channel ScrewAttack. The TV filter in Mega Man Legacy Collection simulates a CRT television in-engine more accurately than previous Mega Man compilations, replicating color bleeding and pixel scaling to create authenticity without the use of filters. An additional CRT monitor filter was added as per Cifaldi's preference, replicating the look of SCART video output. After its completion, Cifaldi called the final product “[his] baby”, and would step back from the company to start work on the Video Game History Foundation. Mega Man Legacy Collection was announced on June 8, 2015, shortly after the announcement of remasters for Devil May Cry 4 and Resident Evil Zero.

After the announcement of a sequel on June 5, 2017, Frank Cifaldi revealed that Digital Eclipse was not involved in the production. Instead, the development of Mega Man Legacy Collection 2 was handled by Capcom. Although the Eclipse Engine was capable of faithfully replicating hardware other than the NES, Capcom opted for internal development due to the "complexity and scope of the project". The development team also focused on including both the remaining "classic numbered games in the series" and their original releases, excluding titles such as Mega Man & Bass and the Sega Saturn version of Mega Man 8, which included additional content. Kazuhiro Tsuchiya, the producer at Capcom, claimed it took "three times the amount of work" due to the technological differences between games. Capcom took inspiration from Digital Eclipse's design, keeping the Challenges and bonus material while altering the user interface to be more user-friendly.

== Release ==
Mega Man Legacy Collection was announced prior to E3 2015, and was playable on the E3 show floor. It also received its own display station at San Diego Comic-Con in 2015. The original Mega Man Legacy Collection was released in North America and Europe on August 25, 2015, for PlayStation 4, Windows, and Xbox One. The Nintendo 3DS version was released on February 23, 2016, followed by a Japanese release on February 25, 2016. The Nintendo 3DS version had a collector's edition release, which came bundled with an exclusive golden Mega Man Amiibo figure. It released in Japan on all other platforms on May 26, 2016. Additionally, the collection received a physical release at a reduced price exclusively in Japan on September 14, 2017 for Nintendo 3DS. A sequel to Mega Man Legacy Collection was listed early on the Korean Game Rating and Administration Committee website. Mega Man Legacy Collection 2 was later announced on June 5, 2017. It released on August 8, 2017, for PlayStation 4, Windows, and Xbox One. Initially, there were no plans for a release on Nintendo Switch. A Nintendo Switch version was later announced during the 30th anniversary of the Mega Man series, and both compilations were later ported to the console on May 22, 2018. A combined physical release for Switch, Mega Man Legacy Collection 1 + 2, includes a game card for Legacy Collection and a download code for Legacy Collection 2, which is only available in digital format. The Nintendo Switch compilation launched a few days later in Japan on May 24, 2018. Mega Man Legacy Collection was also available on the Amazon Luna Retro Channel prior to its discontinuation.

== Reception ==
=== Mega Man Legacy Collection ===
Mega Man Legacy Collection

Aggregate scores
Aggregator	Score
Metacritic	77/100 (3DS); 83/100 (NS); 85/100 (PC); 77/100 (PS4); 80/100 (XB1)
OpenCritic	73%

Review scores
Publication	Score
Destructoid	8.5/10
Famitsu	8/10, 8/10, 8/10, 7/10
GameRevolution	4/5
GameSpot	7/10
GamesRadar+	8/10
Hardcore Gamer	4.5/5
HobbyConsolas	7/10
IGN	9/10
Jeuxvideo.com	16/20
MeriStation	7/10
Nintendo Life	9/10
Nintendo World Report	8.5/10 (3DS); 8/10 (NS)
Official Xbox Magazine (UK)	5/10
Push Square	8/10
Shacknews	8/10
USgamer	4.5/5
VentureBeat	8/10

Mega Man Legacy Collection received positive reviews according to the review aggregators Metacritic and OpenCritic. Will Freeman writing for The Guardian summarized the collection as "direct, untainted ports of the series’ first six games", providing the best entry point for new players. Initially, Mike Minotti of GamesBeat thought the selection was underwhelming, being less comprehensive than the Mega Man Anniversary Collection, with all six games included being released on the Nintendo 3DS Virtual Console. He also noted the absence of recent titles such as Mega Man 9 and 10.

Mega Man Legacy Collection 2

Aggregate scores
Aggregator	Score
Metacritic	77/100 (NS); 73/100 (PC); 71/100 (PS4); 72/100 (XB1)
OpenCritic	49% recommended

Review scores
Publication	Score
Destructoid	8/10
Electronic Gaming Monthly	4/5
GameSpot	6/10
Hardcore Gamer	7/10
HobbyConsolas	6.5/10
IGN	6/10
Jeuxvideo.com	15/20
MeriStation	7/10
Nintendo Life	7/10
Nintendo World Report	7/10
Push Square	8/10
Shacknews	7/10
USgamer	4/5
VentureBeat	8/10

=== Sales ===
During its first week, the Nintendo 3DS version was the second best-selling game in Japan, and Media Create reported that 50% of the initial shipment was sold at retail. According to Capcom, the Nintendo Switch release "maintained robust sales". As of September 30, 2025, Legacy Collection is currently the second best-selling Mega Man game with 1.7 million copies sold, while Legacy Collection 2 is the eighth best-selling with over 1 million copies sold. The commercial success of Mega Man Legacy Collection led Capcom to gain confidence in the release of Mega Man 11, which has since become the best-selling Mega Man video game.

== See also ==
- Mega Man Anniversary Collection, a previous compilation of the original Mega Man series
