= Mega Man II =

Mega Man II may refer to:

- Mega Man 2, the 1988 game for the Nintendo Entertainment System (NES)
- Mega Man II (1991 video game) for the Game Boy
- Mega Man 2: The Power Fighters, the 1996 arcade game
- Mega Man Mobile 2, the 2017 mobile game
