= Rockman.EXE =

Rockman.EXE may refer to:

- Mega Man Battle Network (originally titled Rockman.EXE in Japan), part of the Mega Man franchise of video games

- MegaMan.EXE, a variation of Mega Man (character) which serves as the protagonist of the Mega Man Battle Network series, and is known in Japan as Rockman.EXE
- Mega Man Battle Network (video game), the first game in the series (released in Japan as Battle Network Rockman EXE)

- MegaMan NT Warrior (released in Japan under the name Rockman.EXE), the anime and manga series based upon the Battle Network series

== See also ==
- Mega Man – a multimedia franchise known as Rockman in Japan
