= Rockman EXE WS =

2003 video game

- Developer: Tose
- Publisher: Bandai
- Composer: Akari Kaida
- Series: Mega Man Battle Network
- Platform: WonderSwan Color
- Release: JP: February 8, 2003
- Genre: Platform
- Mode: Single-player

Rockman EXE WS (ロックマンエグゼ WS) is a platform video game, part of the Mega Man Battle Network subseries of Mega Man video games. The game was released on the WonderSwan Color, only in Japan. This game is a platformer like Mega Man Network Transmission, rather than a role-playing game.

== Plot ==
The storyline of Rockman EXE WS follows most of the story beats from the first season of the MegaMan NT Warrior animated series. Each stage from the first 5 chapters of the game loosely adapts an episode from the show, and Chapters 2, 3, 4, and 5 have branching paths that lead to different episode adaptations.

After having his plans foiled by Lan and MegaMan.EXE several times throughout the game, Dr. Wily has Roll.EXE kidnapped to draw out the heroes. Lan and MegaMan.EXE track down WWW's base, beat Chaud and ProtoMan.EXE in a duel, defeat Dr. Wily and his Life Virus, and save Roll.EXE.

After fulfilling specific requirements, Lan and MegaMan.EXE later end up exploring the Undernet. In there, MegaMan.EXE encounters the Gospel Multibug Organism and defeats it in battle.

== Gameplay ==
Rockman EXE WS incorporates action and platforming elements from the classic Mega Man games while incorporating elements from the Battle Network series of games. Unlike the majority of the Battle Network games, MegaMan.EXE is the only playable character in the game as Lan Hikari acts as a support character throughout the game, only appearing in dialogue boxes, menus, or calls to MegaMan.EXE to give him advice on the currently stage.

Combat is handled in real-time. MegaMan.EXE has the ability to jump, slide, climb ladders, fire his default arm cannon, or use one of his four equipped Battle Chips. His default arm cannon can be charged up to release bigger projectiles that deal more damage. Player health is displayed on the left side of the screen with a health bar while bosses have their health displayed on the right side of the screen.

Like the rest of the Battle Network series, an elemental system vaguely similar to the Pokémon series exists for most characters. The elements are Heat, Aqua, Elec, Wood, and Null. Barring Null, the elements receive double damage from their succeeding element (e.g., Heat attacks deal double damage to Wood characters, but Heat characters take double damage from Aqua attacks, etc.). MegaMan.EXE by default is Null element, but he can use Style Changes to change his element, his charge shots, and his statistics (i.e., move faster, take reduced damage, etc.) after winning them from specific boss battles.

Battle Chips are mapped to the four directional buttons on the Y-Pad of the WonderSwan Color and are grouped into several different categories. Some chips are support chips that alter MegaMan.EXE's stats when selected (e.g., Air Shoes increases MegaMan.EXE's jump height, etc.), some can be toggled and change MegaMan.EXE's attack when toggled on (e.g., Sword changes MegaMan.EXE's buster to a sword, etc.), and others act as single use weapons or power-ups that deplete in overall quantity each time they're used (e.g., Recovery 20 restores some health, Attack +20 makes the next chip deal more damage, etc.). Choosing specific combinations of chips can lead to powerful attacks known as Program Advances, which can then be activated by pressing down twice. Unlike other games in the Battle Network series, Battle Chips are not placed in Folders as Lan gives them to MegaMan through the pause menu, and single-use Battle Chips are permanently lost. Chips can be found by deleting specific foes or by picking them up throughout the level.

The main campaign of the game is divided up into 6 main chapters and one unlockable chapter. Stages are mostly linear and feature a boss at the end. However, several stages feature split paths with different bosses. Furthermore, hidden items are blocked behind walls that require specific Battle Chips or Program Advances to break them down. To fully complete the game, multiple playthroughs are required as all paths need to be visited at least once to unlock the 7th chapter.

After completing the 7th chapter, the "Extra" mode is unlocked. This mode acts as a boss rush mode that pits MegaMan.EXE against all of the bosses of the game at various difficulties. By choosing the hardest difficulty, the player can face against Bass.EXE, who is not fought during the main campaign.

== Reception ==
Rockman EXE WS was scored a total of 26 out of 40 from a panel of four reviewers in the Japanese Famitsu magazine. Lucas M. Thomas and Craig Harris of IGN preferred this unlocalized game over the card-based Mega Man Battle Chip Challenge, which was released on the WonderSwan and on the Game Boy Advance in Western territories. 1UP.com's Jeremy Parish agreed Rockman EXE WS was better, but still called it "a pretty terrible excuse for a Mega Man game, similar in concept to Network Transmission, but indescribably worse."
