= Mega Man Battle Network 6 =

2005 video game

- North American Cybeast Gregar box art
- Developer: Capcom Production Studio 2
- Publisher: Capcom
- Director: Masahiro Yasuma
- Producer: Keiji Inafune
- Designers: Masahiro Yasuma; Shinsuke Kodama
- Artists: Yuji Ishihara; Tokiko Nakashima; Hayato Kaji
- Writers: Masakazu Eguchi; Teruhiro Shimogawa
- Composer: Yoshino Aoki
- Series: Mega Man Battle Network
- Platform: Game Boy Advance
- Release: JP: November 23, 2005; NA: June 13, 2006; EU: June 16, 2006
- Genre: Real-time tactical role-playing
- Mode: Single-player

Mega Man Battle Network 6: Cybeast Gregar (Note: Japanese: ロックマンエグゼ6 電脳獣グレイガ, Hepburn: Rokkuman Eguse 6 Dennōjū Gureiga; lit. 'Rockman.EXE 6: Cyberbeast Graga') and Mega Man Battle Network 6: Cybeast Falzar (Note: Japanese: ロックマンエグゼ6 電脳獣ファルザー, Hepburn: Rokkuman Eguse 6 Dennōjū Faruzā; lit. 'Rockman.EXE 6: Cyberbeast Falzer') are 2005 tactical role-playing games developed and published by Capcom for the Game Boy Advance (GBA) handheld game console. They are the sixth and final game in the Mega Man Battle Network series, and involves Lan Hikari's family and MegaMan.EXE moving to Cyber City, only to need to once again stop the returning WWW (World Three) and their plans to re-awaken the Cybeasts.

Battle Network 6 marks the end of the Battle Network series, as shown in the ending, although this wasn't initially the case; the developers stated the decision to end the series was only made part-way through development, and after several of the graphics were re-done. The international versions of the games also removed a significant amount of content, primarily due to Konami not localizing Shin Bokura no Taiyō: Sabata's Counterattack for Western territories.

Like with the previous few games, Mega Man Battle Network 6 received a generally tepid reception from critics, who near-universally highlighted lack of improvements from previous installments in terms of graphics and gameplay, although some praised its story. Despite being considered the end of the series, one last game, Rockman.EXE: Legend of Network, released in 2006 in Japan for mobile phones. It was re-released for the Wii U's Virtual Console in 2015, and as part of the Mega Man Battle Network Legacy Collection compilation in 2023. A successor to the Battle Network series, titled Mega Man Star Force, also released in 2006 for the Nintendo DS.

== Plot ==
Lan Hikari and his family have moved to Cyber City, and Lan becomes friends with Mick, a bad-tempered kid, and Tab, a boy who works at a Battle Chip store. He also learns about Copybots that allow Megaman to enter the real world. However, WWW has returned once again and is causing trouble that not the Official NetBattlers and even Eugene Chaud and ProtoMan.EXE can stop them, so Lan and MegaMan.EXE decides to investigate. Here, Lan and MegaMan discovers that the Cybeast Gregar which is created out of the combination of multiple bugs (like Gospel) and Cybeast Falzar which created as a means to counter Gregar but went out of control, have something to do with a mysterious conspiracy. When a WWW Navi, CircusMan.EXE, captures one of the Cybeasts, MegaMan captures the other Cybeast into his body. Lan and MegaMan must fight WWW and stop whatever they're up to. At first it seems that Baryl and Colonel.EXE were the culprits of the conspiracy, but later in the end he admits that he was working for Dr. Wily himself.

Dr. Wily raised Baryl when his own father was off fighting in a war, and in his kindness for Baryl, he was distracted from his plans for revenge of the Net society. He also created Colonel, the "Perfect Navi" who had the ability to feel kindness and had powers of machine manipulation. However, once Baryl's father, his only true friend was killed in battle, Wily began to feel the past thoughts of revenge and modified Colonel to become a military grade Navi. The other programs were modified into a separate Navi named Iris.EXE. She was to be a military control Navi, until she met Lan, who showed her that humans were not bloodthirsty killers.

As a precaution, Wily planted a program forbidding these Navis to merge by having them explode if they were ever to do so. To hatch his latest scheme to destroy the Net and the world, he built 2 enormous Copybots and installed the Cybeast Gregar and Falzar in them, until Baryl decided what was truly right and began to battle one of the Cybeasts. MegaMan also began to battle the other Cybeast, until in a twist, the Cybeast took over MegaMan's body once again. Colonel and Iris began the risky merging, and with their heightened powers they destroyed the Cybeast from MegaMan's body. However, instead of separating, they sacrifice themselves to destroy the Cybeast once and for all; afterwards, both of the Copybots explode, leaving Cyber City in ruins, and forcing the Hikari family to move back to ACDC Town. As a graduation gift, the surviving Baryl sends Iris's Copybot to Lan, allowing MegaMan to stay in the real world all he wanted.

The final scene flashes forward 20 years in an epilogue as Lan narrates the future of all the characters, including how he married Mayl and had a son named Patch Hikari, as well as and a reformed Dr. Wily creating peace-keeping programs for the internet named Iris and Colonel.

== Gameplay ==
A player "Beasting Out" MegaMan.EXE using the Beast Out icon (Cybeast Gregar ver.).

The gameplay of Mega Man Battle Network 6 is largely identical to that of its predecessors. The player explores the real world through Lan Hikari and the Net through MegaMan.EXE. When Lan plugs his PET, a handheld computer, into a computer with an interface jack, he can upload MegaMan.EXE to the cyber network, allowing him to explore and fight viruses as random encounters.

When MegaMan encounters viruses, the screen shifts to a battle screen set on a six by three square grid. On the left half of the grid is MegaMan, and on the other half are his opponents. MegaMan has a relatively weak arm cannon, the Mega Buster, but his main weapon is Lan's library of battle chips, one-use-per-battle special attacks which grant various abilities, including simple attacks, attack enhancements, defensive effects, terrain transmogrification, or assistance from other NetNavis. Before battle, the player can construct a folder consisted of thirty battle chips, and each turn of a battle (measured by a timer bar at the top of the screen), the player is presented with a random selection of these chips. The player can send MegaMan up to five Battle Chips, after which the battle takes place in real time, with MegaMan, controlled by the player, attacking with his Mega Buster, dodging attacks, or activating battle chips from his queue.

Succeeding the Soul Unison (Double Soul) system, is the Cross System. Although similar to the preceding system in Battle Network 4 and 5, Crosses can last for the entire duration of a battle without utilizing the three-turn limit and can be activated without a sacrificial chip. Upon finishing an ally Navi's mission and battle, MegaMan will gain the Navi Link to that particular Navi, thus enabling a Cross between MegaMan and the corresponding Navi; said transformation can be activated at any time and lasts indefinitely, but are disabled for the rest of the battle if hit by its elemental weakness; gained Link Navis can also be freely used to move around the internet, and function similarly to MegaMan's allies in Battle Network 5, but have a fixed jack-in point. The Link Navis and Crosses gained differ depending on the version played. Beast Out is an additional gameplay element after MegaMan encounters one of two Cybeasts esclusive to one of the game's versions. This feature can be activated by pressing the "Beast Button" in the Custom Screen, allowing him to enter Beast Out; Beast Out only last three turns, and can be combined with Soul Crosses. Once the counter reaches zero, the transformation will automatically end and MegaMan will turn back to normal and become tired, preventing him from entering in Full-Syncro or other emotions. Attempting to Beast Out when the counter is already zero will cause MegaMan to "Beast Over", which results in him moving and attacking uncontrollably for a turn. Once he returns to normal at the end of the turn, he will become exhausted, after which his HP will rapidly drop to 1, all the stats of his Mega Buster drop to their lowest level and he won't be unable to go in Full-Synchro, transform, or enter any other emotion for the rest of the battle. If he finishes a battle while very tired or when he's in Beast Over, he will start the next battle tired and won't be allowed to Beast Over again until the battle is finished.

There are many other small changes, including chips now being limited by their MB size, alongside their type; players can also "tag" 2 Chips in their folder as long as the combined size is below 60 MB, which will cause them to randomly appear together in the Custom Screen. Another one is a slight change in the Navi Customizer, in which parts can be placed off the map, allowing the player to install more programs, but at the risk of having a bug. Like previous entries, players are able to fight and trade with each other using the Game Boy Advance link cable, now including support for the Wireless Adapter.

== Development and release ==
Mega Man Battle Network 6 was developed for the Game Boy Advance (GBA) handheld video game console. Series writer Masakazu Eguchi stated that the decision to end the series with Battle Network 6 wasn't made when development started; the new project leader had desired to re-do many of the game's assets to make it feel "fresh", including the environment, until it was decided to be the series' conclusion due to the announcement of the Nintendo DS. The game was exhibited at Tokyo Game Show 2005, and released in Japan on November 23, 2005, with pre-orders for the game coming with a Battle Network-themed spoon, fork, and case.

Capcom and Takara later released the Navi Link System in February 2006, allowing players to dynamically adjust the stats of the Navi Data Chips for use in-game; the system was also compatible with the arcade game Rockman.EXE: Battle Chip Stadium, and Link PET_EX LCD game. Capcom further re-released the game on March 23, 2006, as the Rockman.EXE 6: Beast Link Gate DX Edition, a bundle that comes with the Beast Link Gate peripheral allowing players to be in permanent Beast Out, as well as use real Battle Chips. Despite being considered the final game (outside of re-releases), a gaiden game titled Rockman.EXE: Legend of Network released for Japanese mobile phones in 2006.

=== Content removal ===
Mega Man Battle Network 6 released in Western territories starting on June 13, 2006; the international versions of Battle Network 6 had significant amounts of content cut, including a crossover scenario with Shin Bokura no Taiyō: Sabata's Counterattack, which Konami did not localize outside of Japan due to poor sales of the first two games. The Beast Link Gate content was also disabled.

=== Re-releases ===
On November 18, 2015, on its tenth anniversary, both versions of the game were made available on the Japanese Wii U Virtual Console; due to the lack of multiplayer emulation, entering the "Comm" menu will instead give the players all Chips that required multiplayer, alongside the e-Reader exclusive jobs. (Note: In international versions, these jobs were always made available by default due to the e-Reader functionality being removed.) It was also released in North America on March 10, 2016. Both versions were also included in the Mega Man Battle Network Legacy Collection in 2023 for PlayStation 4, Nintendo Switch, and PC.

== Reception ==
Reception

Aggregate scores
Aggregator	Score
GameRankings	63% (Falzar); 65% (Gregar)
Metacritic	63/100 (Falzar); 62/100 (Gregar)

Review scores
Publication	Score
1Up.com	B−
Famitsu	33/40
Game Informer	6.5/10
GameSpot	6.9/10
GameSpy	3/5
GameZone	5.4/10
IGN	5.5/10
Jeuxvideo.com	14/20
Nintendo Life	8/10
Nintendo Power	7.5/10
Nintendo World Report	5.5/10

=== Sales ===
Both versions of the game placed in the Media Create top ten best-selling games list in Japan during their release week. Cybeast Gregar placed at number three with 107,099 units sold, while Cybeast Falzar placed at number six with 65,560 units sold. The two versions of the game sold nearly half a million copies combined during its first month in the region and a total of 610,000 copies by the end of Capcom's 2005 fiscal year. The game achieved solid sales outside Japan.

=== Critical response ===
Both versions were released to mixed reviews, with Falzar and Gregar holding averages of 63 and 62 out of 100 on Metacritic respectively.

Like with previous new games in the series, reviewers near-universally highlighted the lack of changes Battle Network 6 made from previous installments. It was commented by Frank Provo of GameSpot that "there's really nothing in Mega Man Battle Network 6 that wasn't in the previous games, but they'll likely feel compelled to finish this one anyway, since the story provides the payoff for events that have been building since the first game". Reviewers generally praised the new customization aspects, but felt they weren't enough to make the game feel different.

Similarly, the game's presentation was also poorly received, with it often being unfavorably compared to contemporary GBA games. Mark Bozon wrote for IGN: "you can see more than ever that the series is beginning to get lazy with presentation, as less and less unique animation is being used to tell the story", which GameSpy agreed with. GameSpot felt the music and sound effects were "serviceable", albeit holdovers from Battle Network 2, while GameZone called them "boring". It was agreed by reviewers that the game would only interest die hard fans or newcomers.

== Legacy ==
With the conclusion of the Mega Man Battle Network series, the development staff would start conceptualizing a follow-up to the series, later evolving into the Mega Man Star Force series; Star Force takes place 200 years later in the years of 22XX and focuses on radio wave technology, while maintaining several gameplay concepts introduced in Battle Network. As a whole, the Star Force series was not nearly as successful as Battle Network, which was attributed in retrospect to its perceived lack of changes; after the release of two sequels and Rockman.EXE: Operate Shooting Star (2009)–an enhanced DS port of the first Battle Network game released only in Japan–Capcom would discontinue development on a fourth entry due to poor sales. (Note: Sales of Mega Man Star Force games (in millions): Mega Man Star Force: 0.59; Mega Man Star Force 2: 0.29; Mega Man Star Force 3: 0.17; Rockman.EXE: Operate Shooting Star: 0.06)

The story of Mega Man Battle Network 6 was loosely adapted into the events of the Beast season of the anime series MegaMan NT Warrior; in Beast, Lan and several of his friends are transported to a parallel world in a continual Dimensional Area, areas where the Cyber World and real world meld together. Many of the characters in the season, including Baryl and Colonel, have different personalities that are more inline with their game counterparts, rather than the anime. Other characters and elements of Battle Network 6 not present in Beast would be adapted into the Beast+ season, as they also do in the last chapters of Ryo Takamisaki's manga.
