= Street Fighter X Mega Man =

2012 crossover action-platform video game published by Capcom

- Developer: Seow Zong Hui
- Publisher: Capcom
- Programmer: Seow Zong Hui
- Artists: Seow Zong Hui; George Papapetrou
- Composer: Luke Esquivel
- Series: Mega Man; Street Fighter
- Platform: Microsoft Windows
- Release: December 17, 2012
- Genres: Action, platform
- Mode: Single-player

Street Fighter X Mega Man (Note: also known as Street Fighter X Rockman (ストリートファイター X ロックマン, Sutorīto Faitā Kurosu Rokkuman) in Japan) is a platform game created by Singaporean fan developer Seow Zong Hui. Initially developed as a fan game, Street Fighter X Mega Man later received support from Capcom, who assisted in the production of the game. Street Fighter X Mega Man was released as a free download from Capcom Unity on December 17, 2012. The crossover game celebrates the 25th anniversary of both Capcom's Mega Man and Street Fighter franchises. Gameplay mimics the design of classic Mega Man games with Street Fighter characters substituting as important enemies encountered in the game. The game received mixed to positive reviews by critics, with some common complaints relating to technical issues and a lack of a save feature. In response to the complaints, an update was released on January 28, 2013 titled Street Fighter X Mega Man V2, which added a password save feature and other fixes.

== Premise and gameplay ==
Mega Man battling Dhalsim

Street Fighter X Mega Man mimics the appearance and gameplay style of Mega Man games released on the Nintendo Entertainment System. The game's premise and plot center around its status as a crossover video game and the respective anniversaries of both franchises. Having fought countless Robot Masters over the years, Mega Man is ready to lie back, relax and enjoy his 25th anniversary. Getting wind of this, Ryu and his fellow Street Fighters want one last battle before they let their own anniversary finish. In terms of gameplay, Mega Man uses the same set of moves (the slide and the charge shot) featured in Mega Man 4. Instead of using stages based on Mega Man and using Robot Masters as level bosses, the stages share influences from the Street Fighter franchise stages and characters such as Blanka, Chun-Li, and Ryu take the place of the Robot Masters as the end of level bosses. The Street Fighter characters use their signature moves as attacks; in addition, they have their own Super Meters that build up when they take damage during the boss fights and allow them to launch a powerful attack at Mega Man once filled. Like other Mega Man games, defeating each boss earns Mega Man a new weapon based on the characters' attacks, such as Ryu's Hadouken and Chun-Li's Hyakuretsu Kyaku. After clearing the eight main levels, the player then moves on to face the final set of bosses. Clearing certain conditions allows players to fight hidden bosses Sagat and Akuma at the end of the game.

== Development ==
The game began as the private development of Seow Zong Hui who presented an early build to Christian Svensson, Capcom's Senior VP of consumer software, at EVO 2012. Svensson showed the build to several staff members in the Capcom office (including senior community manager Brett Elston), and Capcom later decided to assist in the development of the game. While Zong Hui continued to develop the game based on his original design, Capcom took over tasks such as funding, marketing, and quality assurance. Capcom decided to distribute the game on PC instead of gaming consoles because Zong Hui did not have a license for console development. Svensson has noted that Capcom will consider console releases in the future, but chose to initially distribute the game on PC to keep the game free for fans and meet its December 17 target release date.

Zong Hui noted several concepts that were scrapped during development. Yang was originally planned as a boss character but was ultimately replaced by Chun-Li. His special weapon is still included in the game via cheat codes. Zong Hui also wanted to include alternate costumes for boss characters and a second playable character from the Street Fighter franchise.

Following release, there were several complaints about the game crashing, having a vague user interface, and lacking any save system. In response to these complaints, Svensson noted that a patch was being discussed with the development team to address these issues in a future update. An updated version was released on January 28, 2013 under the name, Street Fighter X Mega Man V2. The update boasts an improved user interface, better controller compatibility, bug fixes, a password save system reminiscent of the original Mega Man games on the Nintendo Entertainment System, and an additional boss character.

=== Music ===
Chiptune artist Luke Esquivel ("A_Rival") composed the music for the game. Esquivel became involved when he approached Zong Hui via YouTube and requested to being full-time musician for the game in 2009/2010 after comparing his music with Zong Hui's previous musician. When composing the music for Street Fighter X Mega Man, Esquivel combined Mega Man themes with Street Fighter themes on certain songs. In other songs, he would use elements from various Mega Man songs in order not to break the cohesion of the original soundtrack. Esquivel based most of the sounds on the first two Mega Man games, but had also used sounds from Mega Man 3, 4, and 5. Esquivel also added original compositions within several songs including two completely original compositions: "Willy Map Theme" and the beginning of the "Ending" theme. The soundtrack blends popular themes from both franchises together (such as mixing Snake Man's theme from Mega Man 3 with Dhalsim's theme from Street Fighter II). The official soundtrack titled Street Fighter X Mega Man OST was released for free on Esquivel's website on December 18, 2012. An EP with a total of four tracks titled Street Fighter X Mega Man X-tended Vol. 1 was released on February 8, 2013.

Street Fighter X Mega Man OST track list
No.	Title	Length
1.	"Main Theme"	01:02
2.	"Select Your Fighter"	00:28
3.	"Blanka Stage"	01:55
4.	"Chun-Li Stage"	01:33
5.	"C. Viper Stage"	02:12
6.	"Dhalsim Stage"	01:17
7.	"Urien Stage"	01:50
8.	"Rolento Stage"	02:12
9.	"Rose Stage"	01:38
10.	"Ryu Stage"	01:49
11.	"Boxer Stage"	01:46
12.	"Claw Stage"	01:46
13.	"Seth's Lab"	01:21
14.	"Dictator Final Battle"	02:02
15.	"Ending"	02:15
16.	"Get Your Weapons Ready"	00:32
17.	"Akuma Theme"	01:43
18.	"Goes With Everything"	02:16
19.	"DESCEND TRANSFER"	00:06
20.	"Continue"	00:20
21.	"VS"	00:06
22.	"Boss"	00:42
Total length:		0:30:49

Street Fighter X Mega Man X-tended Vol. 1 track list
No.	Title	Length
1.	"Sagat Theme"	01:31
2.	"Yang Theme (Unused)"	01:51
3.	"Voice Collection"	00:37
4.	"Ryu Theme (Super Square Remix)"	03:15
Total length:		0:07:14

== Reception ==
Street Fighter X Mega Man

Aggregate scores
Aggregator	Score
GameRankings	71.71%
Metacritic	71/100

Review scores
Publication	Score
Destructoid	7/10
Edge	5/10
Game Informer	8/10
IGN	7/10

Two days after release, Capcom Senior VP Christian Svensson commented on the official Capcom website, Capcom-Unity, that the game has exceeded his personal expectations in terms of downloads, but no exact numbers have been released. Capcom's Senior Community Manager, Brett Elston, noted that the number of downloads during release was enough to cause significant strain on their servers. By March 3, 2013, the game had been downloaded one million times.

Street Fighter X Mega Man has been met with mostly mixed to positive reviews. Game Informer gave the game an 8 out of 10, summarizing that "Street Fighter X Mega Man pales in comparison to the rest of the classic entries, but it's still a wonderful test of the waters for newcomers and a charming experiment for lifelong fans." Inside Gaming Daily gave the game an 8 out of 10, stating, "Though it's short and strays away a bit from traditional Mega Man games, Street Fighter X Mega Man is a great play that you honestly have little reason not to experience." IGN gave the game a 7 out of 10, noting that "The end result is a fine game that Mega Man fans will enjoy once or twice, but one without that special something that would allow it to rise to the greatness Mega Man so regularly reached in its heyday." Destructoid echoed similar opinions stating, "Street Fighter X Mega Man is not the best or most polished Mega Man game around, but it's a solid effort by a very dedicated fan." Game Industry News gave it a 3.5 out of 5, with a mixed review, stating, "It combines two of Capcom's greatest games in history into one nostalgic mash up that is sure to take fans on a trip down memory lane while still feeling fresh. Unfortunately though, the lack of challenge or the ability to continue progress after shutting down the game only hinders Street Fighter X Mega Man from being the perfect jewel it could have been." Edge however gave the game a 5 out of 10, noting "inconsistent level design and limited functionality" as the game's biggest flaws.
