= Mega Man 6 =

1993 video game

- North American box art
- Developer: Capcom
- Publishers: JP: Capcom; NA: Nintendo
- Producer: Tokuro Fujiwara
- Designer: Ichiro Mihara
- Programmers: Mitsuteru Fukushima; Nobuhito Shimizu
- Artists: Keiji Inafune; Naoya Tomita; Kazushi Itō; Toshifumi Onishi
- Composer: Yuko Takehara
- Series: Mega Man
- Platforms: Nintendo Entertainment System; PlayStation; Mobile phone; Android; iOS
- Release: NES: JP: November 5, 1993; NA: March 1994; PlayStation: JP: December 9, 1999; Mobile phone: JP: October 1, 2007; Android, iOS: WW: January 5, 2017
- Genre: Platform
- Mode: Single-player

Mega Man 6 (Note: Known in Japan as Rockman 6: The Greatest Battle in History!! (ロックマン6 史上最大(しじょうさいだ)いの戦(たたかい)!!, Rokkuman Shikkusu: Shijō Saidai no Tatakai!!)) (stylized as MEGA MAN VI) is a 1993 platform game developed and published by Capcom for the Nintendo Entertainment System. It is the sixth installment in the original Mega Man series. It was originally released in Japan by Capcom in 1993, and in North America by Nintendo in 1994. It was included in the Mega Man Anniversary Collection released in 2004. Its first release in Europe and PAL region was June 11, 2013, for the Virtual Console on the Nintendo 3DS, nearly twenty years after the game's initial release.

The story of Mega Man 6 opens during a competitive robot fighting tournament with entrants from all around the globe. A villainous figure known as "Mr. X" announces he has reprogrammed the eight powerful finalists with the intent to use them for taking over the world. The game's robotic protagonist Mega Man, who was sent to oversee the tournament, springs into action to foil X's plot. Mega Man 6 plays nearly identically to its five predecessors with a few added features such as stages with alternate pathways and new Rush adaptors.

Mega Man 6 is the first game in the series to receive character design input from fans outside Japan. This late-era game was also the last in the series released on Nintendo's 8-bit console, and the last game in the series with an 8-bit graphics style until Mega Man 9 in 2008. Due to the declining support of the NES and the growing presence of the newer and more powerful Super Nintendo Entertainment System (SNES), Capcom decided not to publish Mega Man 6 in North America, so it was released by Nintendo in that region. The game received positive reviews, with critics praising the gameplay and use of the established gameplay model from preceding chapters in the series, though it was criticized for not innovating much compared to its predecessors. It was followed up with Mega Man 7, released for the SNES in 1995.

== Plot ==
Mega Man 6's story takes place about a year after the events of Mega Man 5. To counter Dr. Wily's repeated attacks, the Global Robot Alliance was formed, and one year later the "First Annual Robot Tournament" is held to determine the world's strongest peacekeeping robot. The tournament is hosted by a man known only as "Mr. X," the leader of the mysterious "X Foundation" and many strong robots participate. Dr. Light, a pacifist, decides not to enter the competition, but sends the robotic hero Mega Man to supervise it. Before the event can begin, however, Mr. X announces that he has reprogrammed eight of the strongest contestants to do his bidding in taking over the world: Blizzard Man, Centaur Man, Flame Man, Knight Man, Plant Man, Tomahawk Man, Wind Man, and Yamato Man, and tells Mega Man he had been manipulating Dr. Wily from the beginning. Following this, Mega Man and Rush set out to put an end to Mr. X's plan. Mega Man destroys the eight Robot Masters and then goes to Mr. X's fortress. The villain is beaten and quickly reveals himself as none other than a disguised Dr. Wily. The evil scientist flees to a new fortress stronghold where Mega Man pursues and defeats him again. The game ends with Dr. Wily finally brought to justice and sent to prison.

== Gameplay ==
Using one of two adaptors, Mega Man combines with Rush to propel through the air, seen in the first stage of Mr. X's Fortress.

The gameplay in Mega Man 6 is largely similar to its five NES predecessors. The player takes control of Mega Manto complete a series of side-scrolling platform stages littered with smaller robot enemies and occasional larger mini-bosses. The player's primary method of attack is the "Mega Buster" cannon, which can be charged for more powerful shots. At the end of each of the initial eight stages is a boss battle, where the player inherits that Robot Master's unique "Master Weapon" if successful. These eight levels can be completed in any order, although all Robot Masters are weak to a specific Master Weapon, adding an element of strategy to the order chosen by the player. The player's health is represented by a gauge that can be refilled by picking up energy pellets. Extra lives, reserve energy tanks, and pellets that refill Master Weapon power can also be found throughout each level. Mega Man 6 introduces the "Energy Balancer", which automatically refills the weapon with the lowest energy when picking up Master Weapon power.

Previous Mega Man games typically allowed the player to call on the transformable dog Rush or use other support items in order to traverse difficult or otherwise inaccessible parts of a stage. Mega Man 6 instead features a pair of "Rush Adaptors" that fuse Mega Man and Rush into special forms. The first, "Jet Mega Man", lets the player fly upward or hover for a brief period of time, but prevents the use of charge shots. The second, "Power Mega Man", utilizes a powerful, short-range punch attack for destroying large blocks. The player cannot slide when using either adapter. Mega Man 6 also presents less linear ways to complete the stages than in previous entries in the series. In four of the eight stages, there are two pathways that lead to boss rooms, but the player is required to use one of the Rush adaptors to begin an alternate route. Although either one will clear the stage, only one of them will give the player a letter circuit board for assembling the helper bird Beat. Collecting all four parts will allow the player to call on Beat to attack enemies.

== Development ==
Mega Man 6 was developed at the same time as the franchise's first spin-off, Mega Man X for Nintendo's newer console, the Super Nintendo Entertainment System. Series artist Keiji Inafune, credited as "Inafking", stated that having a video game franchise with six titles is very rare, and one of the advantages to this is that players expect certain aspects of each game to be repeated in the next. After having implemented so many different mechanics to the gameplay of past entries, Inafune thought that Rush adaptor assembly was inevitable. The artist struggled with the adaptor designs and ultimately found them to be unrealistic. According to Inafune, "If you think about it, they shouldn't be able to combine like this. It would be awkward if parts of Rush like his neck were left over after they combined, so what was I supposed to do?"

The Robot Masters featured in some of the previous Mega Man games were the result of design contests held in Japan, in which fans of the series would submit their character ideas to Capcom. Keeping with the tradition, Japan held a design contest for Mega Man 6. After the release of Mega Man 5, the magazine Nintendo Power held a similar contest in North America. Only eight out of the more than 200,000 worldwide character submissions for Mega Man 6 were accepted for the game. Six of the Robot Masters were designed by Japanese fans, while the remaining two (Knight Man and Wind Man) were designed by North American fans who entered the Nintendo Power contest. The North American cover of the game pays homage to the two designers by featuring their Robot Masters on it. Inafune admitted that it was stressful when the last characters being designed for the game were not meeting with the development team's schedule. He concluded, "For having hit a lot of roadblocks, I feel like we got a lot done for 6. The theme for our designs was 'The world is our stage,' and I really enjoyed bringing what I felt was the unique flavor of different countries into the game." Yuko Takehara, credited as "Yuko", composed the musical score for Mega Man 6. Takehara collaborated with several other composers for the follow-up Mega Man 7 in 1995.

A few months after the publication of Mega Man 5, Capcom announced the sixth installment in the original series, as well as Mega Man Soccer and Mega Man X for the SNES, making Mega Man 6 the last title in the franchise to be released on the 8-bit NES. Capcom chose not to publish the game outside Japan. Instead, Nintendo of America published it in March 1994. Before the NES era in North America was about to end, Nintendo of America made a plan to help sell it along with Zoda's Revenge: StarTropics II and the NES version of Wario's Woods, which were also published by Nintendo in North America during the same time. Their plan was to release the top-loading NES-101 for a retail price of $49.99 to attract consumers to buying the updated version of the original NES along with one or more new titles for the console, including Mega Man 6. The game was also showcased alongside Mega Man X at the 1994 Winter Consumer Electronics Show in Las Vegas.

Mega Man 6 was re-released for the PlayStation in 1999 as part of the Rockman Complete Works series exclusive to Japan. This version of the game features a number of extras including remixed music, artwork galleries, and a "navi mode" to help guide players. A port of the Complete Works edition was released on the North American-exclusive Mega Man Anniversary Collection for the PlayStation 2 and GameCube in 2004 and Xbox in 2005.

Mega Man 6 was released on Japanese mobile phones via the i-mode service in 2007. While the first five Mega Man games are available on the Wii's Virtual Console, Mega Man 6 is absent from the Wii Shop Channel; however, the game was released via the Nintendo 3DS Virtual Console in Japan and Europe, with North America on June 20, 2013. It was also released via the Wii U Virtual Console in Japan on May 14, 2014, in Europe on July 24, 2014 and in North America on August 21, 2014.

== Reception and legacy ==
Reception

Review scores
Publication	Score
Electronic Gaming Monthly	7/10, 6/10, 7/10, 7/10
Famitsu	7/10, 5/10, 5/10, 6/10
Game Players	88%
Jeuxvideo.com	15/20
Hippon Super!	7/10

Mega Man 6 has enjoyed a favorable reception from gaming publications and websites. The graphics, play control, challenge level, and added power-ups were generally praised. GamePro was impressed with some of the newer enemies and larger mid-stage bosses, but was displeased with the game's recycling of Master Weapons seen in previous Mega Man games. Overall, the magazine described the graphics, audio, and level design in Mega Man 6 as standard fare for the franchise and called the game a "rock of reliable NES fun" in a series that is as "predictable as the tide". Destructoid editor Tony Ponce considered Mega Man 6 the best game in the entire series. He argued that the game "was retro before retro was cool" due to Capcom's decision to develop it as a higher profile game on the NES during the era of fourth generation consoles. He also expressed appreciation for its music, introductions for each Robot Master, and the use of branching pathways in each level, among many other reasons. Nintendo Power listed Mega Man 6 as the best NES game of 1993, stating, "His sixth NES adventure, in which he uses two new, Special Power-Ups, might just be his best". Craig Skistimas of ScrewAttack also appreciated these innovations and regretted missing out on the game when it was first released. Mega Man 6 is listed by IGN as the 58th best game on the NES. The writers summarized, "Mega Man 6 is considered by many to be the last worthwhile NES release in the catalog, and though that's not saying much when looking at the title's contemporaries, Mega Man 6 is still as good as it gets in many respects."

Mega Man 6 is occasionally seen as "redundant" to the series. GameSpot editors Christian Nutt and Justin Speer labeled Mega Man 6 the "cheesiest" among the NES titles: "If you're looking for mega-laughs, you might want to try this one out." 1UP.com contributors likewise found that the game's "inane" storyline and villains both insult fans of the series and outweigh the game's good soundtrack and interesting power-ups. The four members of the Electronic Gaming Monthly review panel all voiced similar opinions regarding the game's familiar 8-bit presentation and its addition to the already repetitive nature of the series. One reviewer commented, "OK, Mega Man was fun and original back in the days when the letters 'N E S' meant something. Now the game is just getting redundant. Oh sure, Mega Man may learn a few new tricks here and there but this series has to end soon."

Elements of the game made their way into the Mega Man series from Archie Comics prior to it going on indefinite hiatus. Some notable liberties were taken, such as introducing Dr. Pedro Astil, a creator character for Plant Man, and introducing the X Foundation (renamed the X Corporation) at the conclusion of the Mega Man 3 adaptation. The latter concept notably featured Mr. X as a separate character from Dr. Wily and as a future version of Xander Payne, a character exclusive to the comics who became involved in time travel after being part of an anti-robot extremist group known as the Emerald Spears. A view of the events of Mega Man 6 in the series' final issue prior to the hiatus hinted as Xander's overthrow and Wily's seizure of his resources and alias. The X Corporation's resources also provide Wily with the means of laying the groundwork for other schemes, including the abduction of Kalinka Cossack leading into Mega Man 4. Its membership was shown to include numerous identically costumed grunts and Madame Y, a character based on an "alternate universe" concept by former Capcom and Mega Man artist Hideki Ishikawa.
