= Mega Man Anniversary Collection =

- Developer: Atomic Planet Entertainment
- Publisher: Capcom
- Series: Mega Man
- Platforms: PlayStation 2, GameCube, Xbox
- Release: GameCube, PlayStation 2: NA: June 22, 2004; Xbox: NA: March 15, 2005
- Genres: Action, platform
- Mode: Single-player

Mega Man Anniversary Collection is a compilation of video games developed by Atomic Planet Entertainment and published by Capcom. It was released in North America on June 23, 2004 for the PlayStation 2 and GameCube and on March 15, 2005 for the Xbox. The Anniversary Collection contains the first eight games in the original Mega Man series, which debuted on the NES with the first six games, moved to the Super NES with the seventh game, and moved to the PlayStation and Sega Saturn with the eighth game, plus two bonus arcade games. The plot follows the robotic protagonist Mega Man in his continuing adventures battling the evil Dr. Wily and his army of Robot Masters.

== Overview ==
Included games
1987	Mega Man
1988	Mega Man 2
1989
1990	Mega Man 3
1991	Mega Man 4
1992	Mega Man 5
1993	Mega Man 6
1994
1995	Mega Man 7
1995	Mega Man: The Power Battle
1996	Mega Man 2: The Power Fighters
1996	Mega Man 8

Each game has a similar structure in which the player traverses a series of themed stages to face off against boss robots, gain new weapons and abilities, then defeat Dr. Wily in a final confrontation. For the first six titles, an extra feature is the "Navi Mode", originally introduced in the PlayStation (Rockman Complete Works) re-releases of the first six Mega Man games. Navi Mode adds helpers that provide game hints if the player is in need of help, revises the appearance of the health and weapon energy meters, and revises the weapon subscreens for the first three games. In addition to these eight games, the Anniversary Collection includes two unlockable arcade fighting games (Mega Man: The Power Battle and Mega Man 2: The Power Fighters), which had a limited release outside Japan. These two titles are similar in gameplay but a bit more streamlined. The battles cut straight to the bosses, who get progressively more difficult with each one defeated.

Some of the games in the collection have minor differences compared to their original releases. Several of the NES games have remixed sound, while some typos and spelling errors have been corrected. In Mega Man 6, the arranged music is incorrectly mastered and suffers from extensive peaking. In Mega Man 7, an instance of the word "damn" was changed to "darn" in order to maintain an all-ages rating. In addition, the graphics of Mega Man walking away from Wily's Castle are absent from the credits sequence, as the developers were unable to port certain SNES graphical effects. In the compilation's version of Mega Man 8, some of the Robot Masters' voice clips play at incorrect pitches. The PlayStation version of Mega Man 8 is used, as opposed to the Sega Saturn version which included bonus features and additional boss battles.

Other unlockable elements in the Anniversary Collection include original art, remixed music, and bonus videos: The PS2 version features the pilot episode of the Ruby-Spears Mega Man TV series, while the GameCube and Xbox versions feature the Mega Man episode of G4's Icons. The Xbox version also includes the first episode of Mega Man NT Warrior (based on the Mega Man Battle Network game series) and the ability to change the control scheme. The PS2 and Xbox versions include some arranged music for the first six games, also originally present in the Complete Works versions.

== Development ==
Mega Man Anniversary Collection shares qualities with Rockman Complete Works, a lineup of remakes of the first six games in the original Mega Man series, released for the PlayStation in Japan between August and December 1999. The six games were released individually, each disc containing a port of the original Famicom version as the game's "Original Mode" and several extras. A "Navi Mode" was included, featuring a hint system in which a supporting character in each title gives tips to the player via a communicator, as well an updated HUD, an arranged soundtrack, and other optional game modes.

A Game Boy Advance version of Mega Man Anniversary Collection was also in development and was originally due to be released concurrently with the PS2, GameCube, and Xbox incarnations. The game, originally announced as Mega Man Mania, was to feature color versions of the five original Game Boy Mega Man games, as well as a history section and artwork gallery. The game had its release date pushed back several times, with the delay rumored to be caused by Capcom lacking the games' original source code. In January 2006, gamers contacting Capcom were told that the game had been placed on "indefinite hold". Capcom also began issuing refund checks to those who had ordered the game directly through their online store. Around the same time, several retailers, such as GameStop, declared the game "cancelled" and issued refunds or store credits.

== Reception ==
Reception

Aggregate scores
Aggregator	Score		
Aggregator	GameCube	PS2	Xbox
GameRankings	83%	82%	82%
Metacritic	81/100	81/100	80/100

Review scores
Publication	Score		
Publication	GameCube	PS2	Xbox
GameSpot	8.3 out of 10	8.4 out of 10	8.4 out of 10
GameSpy	3/5	3/5	3.5/5
IGN	8.5 out of 10	8.5 out of 10	8 out of 10
Nintendo Power	4/5		
Official U.S. PlayStation Magazine		7 out of 10	
Official Xbox Magazine (US)			8 out of 10
Play	7.5 out of 10	9.1 out of 10	7.5 out of 10

The collection received mostly positive reviews. The collection was slightly criticized for lacking somewhat in the extras department, and the GameCube version was criticized slightly more for not including the remixed audio for Mega Man 1-6. More controversial was the change in the GameCube edition's controls, which saw its fire and jumping buttons reversed from their original NES configuration with no option to arrange them back, making level progression much trickier as a result. Conversely, the exclusive extra in the PS2 and GameCube versions were both praised, with the GameCube version's interview being favored. The Xbox version rated slightly better than the other two versions, because of its added exclusive content as well as the exclusive bonuses from the PS2 and GameCube versions. However, it was given a score of 8.0 (versus 8.5 for the other two versions) from IGN for arriving late, in addition to occasional graphical glitches depending on screen settings, which become more apparent when played on an Xbox 360.

Mega Man Anniversary Collection was a financial success. The PS2 and GameCube versions of Mega Man Anniversary Collection sold a combined total of over 500,000 copies in less than six months of release. Due to the popularity of Anniversary Collection among fans of the series, Capcom followed up with Mega Man X Collection, a similar compilation consisting of games in the Mega Man X series which was exclusively released in North America on January 10, 2006. Once again, Capcom followed up with Mega Man Zero Collection, a compilation of all the games from the Mega Man Zero series that was released in 2010 for the Nintendo DS. In 2015, Capcom released Mega Man Legacy Collection, which featured the 6 original games on the NES with bonus features and improved quality. In 2017, Mega Man Legacy Collection 2 was released and featured 7 and 8, plus 9 and 10.

== See also ==
- Mega Man Legacy Collection, a subsequent compilation of the original Mega Man series
