= Mega Man Star Force =

2006 video game

- North American cover art for all three versions
- Developer: Capcom Production Studio 2
- Publisher: Capcom
- Director: Masahiro Yasuma
- Producer: Takeshi Horinouchi
- Artists: Yuji Ishihara; Tokiko Nakashima
- Writers: Masakazu Eguchi; Teruhiro Shimogawa
- Composers: Yoshino Aoki; Mitsuhiko Takano
- Series: Mega Man
- Platform: Nintendo DS
- Release: JP: December 14, 2006; NA: August 7, 2007; AU: November 28, 2007; EU: November 2007
- Genre: Action role-playing
- Modes: Single-player, multiplayer

Mega Man Star Force: Leo (Note: Japanese: 流星のロックマンレオ, Hepburn: Ryūsei no Rokkuman Reo; lit. 'Shooting Star Rockman: Leo'), Mega Man Star Force: Dragon (Note: Japanese: 流星のロックマンドラゴン, Hepburn: Ryūsei no Rokkuman Doragon; lit. 'Shooting Star Rockman: Dragon'), and Mega Man Star Force: Pegasus (Note: Japanese: 流星のロックマンペガサス, Hepburn: Ryūsei no Rokkuman Pegasasu; lit. 'Shooting Star Rockman: Pegasus'), are 2006 action role-playing games developed and published by Capcom for the Nintendo DS handheld video game console; combined, they are the first game in the Mega Man Star Force series, a sub-series of the Mega Man franchise—and a follow-up to the Mega Man Battle Network series. It takes place in the years of 220X, in which technology has advanced to the point where the world is now connected through EM waves. The game follows Geo Stelar, an 11-year-old fifth-grader in Echo Ridge who merges with an FM-ian alien named Omega-Xis after mourning the supposed death of his father Kelvin Stelar.

The Mega Man Battle Network series had concluded with the sixth game in 2005, with the developers citing the new DS hardware as their reasoning for its ending. Mega Man Star Force continues several gameplay and story elements introduced in Battle Network, with battles taking place on a 3-by-5 grid in which Mega Man is limited to moving left to right in one row and attacking using Battle Cards. Players are also able to play against each other, trade Battle Cards, and form a Brother Band with another player using the DS' wireless capabilities. Prior to its release, Capcom also commissioned anime and manga adaptations to help promote the game.

Mega Man Star Force received mixed reviews from critics upon release; it was often regarded as too similar to Battle Network due to its reuse of concepts, art style, and similar gameplay, with many generally finding it a disappointment. However, it was a commercial success, selling nearly 600,000 copies in Japan by the end of 2007. Mega Man Star Force would spawn two direct sequels for the same system, Mega Man Star Force 2 and Mega Man Star Force 3; a crossover with the first Battle Network game, Rockman.EXE: Operate Shooting Star (2009); and a compilation of the Star Force trilogy, Mega Man Star Force Legacy Collection (2026).

== Gameplay ==
A screenshot of a typical battle sequence

Mega Man Star Force is an action role-playing game much in the same vein as Battle Network. Outside of battle, the game is rendered in a 2D isometric view where the player travels through the real world and finds areas to Electromagnetic Wave Change (EM Wave Change), which tend to be the entrances to the EM Wave World or various computers. In the Wave World, the player is able to encounter viruses, during which the game switches to a 3D view from Mega Man's back, and where movement is restricted to left and right. In battles, HP represents the amount of life Mega Man has. Whenever he is hit by an attack the number decreases, and when it reaches "zero," Mega Man is deleted and the game is over (and the player must start over from when/where they last saved). HP can be recovered in a number of ways, both in and out of battle.

Battle Cards are collected in a number of ways throughout the game, and the player must organize them into a folder to use for battles. Every time the "Custom Gauge" fills during battle, Cards are called up at random and are selected to use against the enemies. Depending on their arrangement on the screen, certain Cards can be selected together to provide combinations, just like Battle Chips from Battle Network. There are three different classes of Cards ranked by their power and rarity (Standard, Mega, and Giga), and only a certain number of Cards from each class, or a certain number of a specific Card, can be placed into a folder; certain Chips can also have an element applied, with Heat chips being effective against Wood enemies. Other options allow players to set certain Cards as favorites so that by connecting to other players via Wi-Fi, they can use their favorite Cards in a random draw during battles. This implements an element of strategy into planning battles.

The game is compatible with Nintendo Wi-Fi Connection as well as wireless play. Through wireless play, players can trade Battle Cards and battle each other's Mega Men. Players can also use the Brother Band network to share favorite Cards, Star Force transformations, or status upgrades as well as send e-mails.

Characters from Lunar Knights (Bokura no Taiyou DS: Django and Sabata) appear in an in-game side-quest and can become Brothers through "Cross Brother Band", with additional cards able to be unlocked by connecting to Lunar Knights. This content was removed in versions released outside of Japan, but was restored and translated for the game's re-release in Mega Man Star Force Legacy Collection.

== Plot ==
=== Setting and characters ===
Mega Man Star Force takes place in the fictional year of 220X, 200 years after the events of the Mega Man Battle Network series, when emphasis on internet technology has lessened, and instead, the world has become networked through use of EM Waves. Though cyber worlds and NetNavis still exist in Star Force, human dependency on them has greatly decreased, and people no longer have Navi companions, instead relying on Transers. Three large satellites orbiting the Earth—Pegasus, Leo, and Dragon—power the EM Wave World that exists around the Earth's atmosphere, keeping the world networked. While the EM Wave World is normally invisible to the human eye, a special piece of eyewear called the Visualizer (possessed by the series's main protagonist) allows a human to see this other world. However, like with the cyber worlds of Battle Network, EM Wave Viruses inhabit the EM Wave World, causing problems in everyday life.

Furthermore, there exists an alien planet known as "FM", inhabited by extraterrestrial beings called FM-ians. FM-ians can traverse in both worlds, and also possess the ability to physically merge with human beings through a process called EM Wave Change. Other than lending a human the FM-ian's powers, this process also transforms an ordinary human into an "EM Wave Human", allowing them to freely operate in the EM Wave World (as well as cyber networks within specific electronic devices). Many of the FM-iams are named after constellations (e.g. Taurus), and merge with people undergoing hardship.

The main protagonist of Star Force is Geo Stelar (although they can be renamed by the player), an 11-year-old fifth-grader living in Echo Ridge who has been in a state of isolation after his father Kelvin's presumed death in the explosion of the space station Peace three years prior. He is soon joined by a rogue FM-ian alien known as Omega-Xis, who takes residency in Geo's Transer; both are able to EM Wave Change into Mega Man (known in other media as Star Force Mega Man), and travel between both the real and EM Wave worlds.

=== Story ===
Geo has been mourning the disappearance of his father Kelvin after the explosion of the space station Peace three years ago, and as a result, he has not been attending school. A group of children from Geo's class constantly urge Geo to attend school, but he always refuses. One day, Geo comes home and finds Aaron Boreal, Kelvin's co-worker at the AMAKEN Space Agency, conversing with Geo's mother, Hope. Aaron gives Geo the Visualizer, a glasses-like device that allows humans to see the EM Wave World. Geo goes outside to sulk on an observation deck over the city when he puts the Visualizer on. Using it, he sees Omega-Xis, who recognizes Geo as Kelvin's son and quickly performs an Electromagnetic Wave Change with him, transforming into the Star Force version of Mega Man.

Omega-Xis is considered a traitor by the FM King because he has stolen the mysterious Andromeda Key, and he also claims to know about the events leading up to Kelvin's disappearance. Geo agrees to work with Omega-Xis to protect the key, and thus, Omega-Xis resides within Geo's Transer. He is aided in his fight against the FMs by the three satellites; eventually, they make it to the space station Peace which had been seized by the FM King, during which Omega-Xis reveals to Geo that he knew Kelvin Stelar before coming to Earth, but converted him into a wave form so the astronaut could escape the king's wrath. They defeat Andromeda but spare the king, following his father's dream to establish peace with other life. The king tells Geo his name is Cepheus, but asks Geo how he could possibly trust one from another world, for he never has. Eventually, he is convinced that he and Geo are kindred spirits and must both set out to make their parts of the universe a better place.

Geo is ready to return to Earth, but the station begins falling apart and he is cut off from the wave road he used to reach the station in the first place and he is forced to escape via a derelict escape pod. For days he and Omega-Xis (who revelated to be a AM-ain) drift through space, doomed to die on this spacecraft and be lost in the void forever but just as Geo is ready to give up hope, somehow, from the endless vastness of space, his father's spirit is finally able to reach him. Geo is confronted by his father in a dream where he tells Geo he must hold on to those he loves most and as long as he keeps believing in them, Kelvin shall always watch over him, no matter how far apart they are. At that moment, Geo's friends Luna, Bud, Zack, Sonia and even Pat have gathered at Geo's favorite spot to call him back home. The strength of their bonds causes all their Brother Bands to converge into a beam that connects with Geo's space pod and miraculously saves him. Geo simply watches the Earth draw closer as he is brought home during the game's credits, never to be the boy he used to be again.

== Development and release ==
The decision to end the Mega Man Battle Network series with the sixth entry wasn't made until partway through development, since the developers wanted to take advantage of the new hardware. According to Capcom producer Takeshi Horinouchi, the Mega Man Star Force games have been among the most difficult games in the franchise to develop because they "[came] on the heels of the Battle Network series," increasing the expectations of the fans. Masahiro Yasuma wrote that the reason for the more simplistic battle system was due to the system in Battle Network 6 being too complicated, so they 'reset' the system so younger children could play; the change in perspective was done to allow for new gameplay, while maintaining the Battle Network feel.

To promote the new game, Capcom commissioned an anime series produced by ShoPro and Xebec, which began airing on October 7, 2006, as well as a manga adaptation by Masaya Itagaki in CoroCoro Comics. Japanese pre-orders came with a replica of Geo's pendant, although these were soon recalled due to safety concerns.

The game's music was composed by Yoshino Aoki and Mitsuhiko Takano and released as the first disc of the Shooting Star Rockman 1 & 2 Original Soundtrack (Note: Japanese: 流星のロックマン１＆２オリジナル・サウンドトラック, Hepburn: Ryūsei no Rokkuman wan ando tsū Orijinaru Saundotorakku) compilation.

== Reception and legacy ==
Reception

Aggregate scores
Aggregator	Score
GameRankings	61% (Pegasus); 59% (Leo); 62% (Dragon)
Metacritic	60/100 (Pegasus); 58/100 (Leo); 60/100 (Dragon)

Review scores
Publication	Score
Famitsu	8/10, 8/10, 7/10, 9/10
GameSpot	6/10
GameSpy	3/5
IGN	5.2/10
Jeuxvideo.com	15/20
Nintendo Power	7.5/10
Official Nintendo Magazine	6.9/10

=== Sales ===
According to weekly Japanese sales report of the first week of release for Mega Man Star Force, none of the three versions placed in the top 10. However, Media Create sales data shows that the three versions of the game sold a combined 219,171 units in Japan by the end of 2006, placing it as the 59th best-selling video game of the year in that region. An additional 374,504 units were sold in 2007, making it the 37th best-selling game of that year and totaling sales to 593,675 units for Japan alone.

=== Critical response ===
Mega Man Star Force received "mixed or average reviews" according to review aggregator Metacritic; Pegasus, Leo and Dragon all scored 60, 58, and 60 out of 100 respectively.

Reviewers generally expressed disappointed about the lack of changes from the Battle Network series, particularly in gameplay and visual style; Colin Moriarty wrote for IGN: "it's more likely to leave the gamer mystified, feeling positive they've been down this road countless times before." GameSpy agreed, stating "we were hoping that Capcom would take this opportunity to reboot the series into something fresh. Instead, we have more of a sidestep than a step forward," although they felt the game would be fine for people who hadn't played any of the prior Battle Network entries.

However, the game received minor praise for its few improvements; reviewers consistently praised the BrotherBand system, although GameSpot had hoped it would allow for more than six friends per game. The expanded length was also praised, though a common sentiment was that it took the story too long to get going, as well as the high amount of backtracking involved in progression.

== Legacy ==
Due to high sales, Capcom produced two sequels for the same system, as well as Rockman.EXE: Operate Shooting Star (2009)—an updated port of the first Battle Network game with a new crossover scenario with Star Force.

A fourth Star Force game was in development between 2009 and 2010, but was cancelled due to low sales of Star Force 3 and Operate Shooting Star.

A compilation of all three Star Force games, Mega Man Star Force Legacy Collection, was released in 2026.
