= Mega Man 5 =

1992 video game

- North American cover art
- Developer: Capcom
- Publishers: JP/NA: Capcom; EU: Nintendo
- Director: Ichirou Mihara
- Producer: Tokuro Fujiwara
- Designer: Ichirou Mihara
- Programmer: Tadashi Kuwana
- Artists: Keiji Inafune; Hayato Kaji; Naoya Tomita; Kazunori Tazaki; Kazushi Itō
- Composer: Mari Yamaguchi
- Series: Mega Man
- Platforms: Nintendo Entertainment System; PlayStation; Mobile phone; Android; iOS
- Release: December 4, 1992: Famicom/NES; JP: December 4, 1992; NA: December 1992; EU: March 10, 1993 PlayStation; JP: November 25, 1999 Mobile phone; JP: October 1, 2007 Android, iOS; WW: January 5, 2017
- Genre: Platform
- Mode: Single-player

Mega Man 5 (Note: stylized in-game as Mega Man V; known as Rockman 5: Blues no Wana!? (ロックマン5 ブルースの罠(わな)!?, Rokkuman 5 Burūsu no Wana!?; lit. "Rockman 5: Blues' Trap!?") in Japan) is a 1992 platform game developed and published by Capcom for the Nintendo Entertainment System. It is the fifth installment of the original Mega Man series and was released in Japan on December 4, 1992. It saw a release during the same month in North America and in 1993 in Europe by Nintendo.

It takes place two months after the events of Mega Man 4. Mega Man's brother and ally Proto Man apparently leads a group of menacing robots in attacks on the world and kidnaps his creator Dr. Light, forcing Mega Man to fight against his brother. Assisted by Dr. Cossack, the scientist he met in the previous game, Mega Man has to figure out the truth about what happened and rescue Dr. Light. Mega Man 5 carries over the same graphical style and action-platforming gameplay as the four preceding chapters in the series. The game introduces a new character, Beat, a robotic bird that the player can use as a weapon once a series of eight collectible letters are found. Artist Keiji Inafune had to re-illustrate the bosses several times but described his work as fun.

Mega Man 5 was met with a positive critical reception for its graphics, difficulty, and music, while receiving criticism for its lack of innovation in its plot or gameplay. Like previous games in the series, Mega Man 5 was remade for PlayStation in Japan. It later appeared on mobile phones, and become part of game collections, including Mega Man Anniversary Collection. It has also been released through Virtual Console and PlayStation Network in emulated form. Two follow-ups were developed at the same time and released in 1993: Mega Man 6, a direct sequel for NES, and Mega Man X, a spin-off for the Super Nintendo Entertainment System, and start of its own game series.

== Plot ==
Mega Man 5 takes place during the 21st century, about two months after the events of Mega Man 4, when the mad scientist Dr. Wily once again attempted to take over the world. Proto Man, secret brother and once ally to the world's greatest hero Mega Man, apparently leads an army of robots in a series of destructive attacks on the world. To cripple the world's defenders, he kidnaps his own creator, the genius scientist Dr. Light. As Mega Man witnesses his creator's kidnapping, he's confused, wondering why Proto Man is doing this, but with little choice left, he sets out to stop him, assisted by Beat, a robot bird that Dr. Cossack gave him as a gift. With Dr. Light gone, Dr. Cossack now assists Mega Man from the sidelines for the occasion, and he powers up the charge shots of his Mega Buster and sends him Beat to help him on his battles to save Dr. Light.

Mega Man prevails over a new group of eight powerful "Robot Masters" working under Proto Man: Star Man, Gravity Man, Gyro Man, Stone Man, Crystal Man, Charge Man, Napalm Man, and Wave Man. He then makes his way to Proto Man's fortress, where he has to fight against the four Dark Men, new robots designed to destroy him, and he defeats the first three, but the alleged Proto Man ambushes Mega Man and nearly kills him. However, a second Proto Man arrives just in time, revealing the first as an imposter: it's the fourth Dark Man. After defeating the final Dark Man, Mega Man finds out that Dr. Wily was behind everything: two months earlier, Proto Man had ruined his most recent evil plan, as he had rescued Dr. Cossack's daughter Kalinka, who Wily had kidnapped to blackmail Dr. Cossack into working with him in order to destroy Mega Man. Wily was furious, and in retaliation, he created Dark Man to frame him for his robot's crimes, including the kidnapping of his own creator.

Mega Man pursues Wily to his newest hideout, defeats him, and saves Dr. Light. However, the fortress begins collapsing, and while Mega Man is distracted from holding up the ceiling from crushing him and Dr. Light, Wily manages yet another retreat. Just after Wily escapes, a familiar whistle is heard, and part of the ceiling is blasted away, allowing Mega Man and Dr. Light to also escape. As the two watch the castle collapse from a distance, their mystery savior is revealed to be the real Proto Man, who quietly slips off unnoticed.

== Gameplay ==
The player (as Mega Man) and his bird companion Beat traverse Star Man's stage.

Mega Man 5 is an action-platform game that is very similar to previous titles in the series. Gameplay revolves around the player using the central character Mega Man to run, jump, and shoot his way through a set of stages. If the player takes damage, Mega Man's life meter can be refilled by picking up energy capsules scattered about each level or from fallen enemies. Mega Man's default Mega Buster arm cannon can be fired an unlimited number of times. The Mega Buster's charge feature, introduced in Mega Man 4, has been upgraded to allow its powerful, charged shots to encompass a wider area. However, if Mega Man gets hit before he could fire a charge shot, the accumulated charge will be lost. Each stage ends with a boss battle with a Robot Master; destroying that Robot Master lets the player copy its special "Master Weapon", which can be toggled and used throughout the remainder of the game. Unlike the Mega Buster, Master Weapons require weapon energy to use and must be replenished if it is depleted in the same selected stage. Other power-ups including extra lives, "Energy Tanks", and a new "Mystery Tank", which fully refills health and all item power, can be picked up as well.

After completing certain stages, the player can call on Mega Man's faithful dog Rush to reach higher platforms or cross large gaps using his "Coil" and "Jet" transformations. These abilities require refills with the same weapon energy that Master Weapons use. Some of the level designs in Mega Man 5 are different from earlier games in the series. For example, in Gravity Man's stage, the gravitation is reversed from the floor to the ceiling, while in Wave Man's stage, the player drives a water craft from the halfway point to the boss room. Hidden within each of the eight Robot Master stages is a collectible circuit board. Gathering all eight of these boards (spelling "M-E-G-A-M-A-N-V" in English versions or "R-O-C-K-M-A-N-5" in the Japanese version) gives the player access to a robot-bird friend by the name of Beat. The player can then call on Beat to attack any onscreen enemies, and he will hone in on and charge them.

== Development ==
Having had major involvement in the development in all prior Mega Man games, artist Keiji Inafune, credited as "Inafking", worked under a new project leader for Mega Man 5. As with past entries in the series, Inafune used his experience to guide his supervisor and the other team members. He did this in order to avoid making what he considered to be an "unreasonable game, [...] an affront to the players". As a result of this leadership, Inafune felt Mega Man 5 turned out with a lower difficulty level. The team already felt they had accomplished all the gameplay they could with the release of Mega Man 4, so they decided to simply "introduce powered up versions of everything", such as the Mega Buster. After working diligently on the fourth installment of the series and being the man behind the concept of the chargeable Mega Buster, Hayato Kaji, credited as "H.K", was called in to help out during the middle of Mega Man 5's development. The game was "taking a while to come together" at that point according to Kaji. Inafune summarized his work on Mega Man 5 as being fun, but he admitted having trouble with the designs, balance, and colors.

In a new direction Capcom held a contest in collaboration with Nintendo Power magazine requesting submissions for new villain characters, the eight Robot Master bosses in Mega Man 5 are a result of fans sending in their own designs to Capcom. Capcom received over 130,000 character submissions for the game. Inafune recounted having a difficult time getting approval on the chosen bosses, having had to re-illustrate them several times. However, the artist had little trouble in designing Beat, whose first draft was accepted by Inafune's superiors. The idea for Beat originated in the development of Mega Man 3, where the concept support robots included a dog and bird. The team chose to keep the dog character as Rush for this earlier game, while the bird would serve as the basis for the character Beat in Mega Man 5. The musical score of Mega Man 5 was composed by Mari Yamaguchi (credited as "Mari").

== Reception and legacy ==
Reception

Review scores
Publication	Score
Electronic Gaming Monthly	6/10, 9/10, 8/10, 8/10
Famitsu	6/10, 6/10, 6/10, 5/10
Game Informer	7.75/10
GamePro	4.5/5
IGN	8.5/10
VideoGames & Computer Entertainment	8/10

Mega Man 5 has enjoyed generally positive reactions from printed and online publications. Many critics were complimentary of the game's graphics, music, play control, and challenge level. IGN's Lucas M. Thomas holds Mega Man 5 as one of his favorite entries in the series and, because of its lowered difficulty compared to its predecessors, considers it the easiest of the bunch to casually pick up and play through. IGN lists Mega Man 5 as the 84th best game on the NES.

Like other sequels in the Mega Man series, Mega Man 5 has suffered criticism for its lack of innovative gameplay and storytelling. GamePro summarized the game as "déjà vu all over again for disciples of the series" and that "Capcom must get some kind of cash rebate for recycling video games". 1UP.com's Jeremy Parish considered Mega Man 5 as "a painfully phoned-in episode lacking not only innovation, but pretty much all the polish and balance that made the earlier games so enjoyable".

In 1999, Mega Man 5 was re-released for the PlayStation as part of the Japan-exclusive Rockman Complete Works series. It featured a helpful "navi mode" for beginners, arranged music, encyclopedia modes, and artwork. A port of this version with fewer extras was released in North America for the PlayStation 2 and GameCube in 2004 and Xbox in 2005 as part of Mega Man Anniversary Collection. Another port of the game was released in Japan in 2007 for mobile phones compatible with Yahoo! Mobile and EZweb applications. Finally, in 2011, the NES version was made available on the Wii Virtual Console service in both Japan and North America, and the PlayStation Network in Japan. It has also been released on the Wii U's Virtual Console as well as the Nintendo 3DS's Virtual Console.
