= Rockman EXE The Medal Operation =

2005 video game

- Publisher(s): Capcom
- Platform(s): Arcade
- Release: 2005 (JP)
- Mode(s): Single-player, multiplayer

Rockman EXE The Medal Operation is an arcade game in the MegaMan Battle Network sub-series of Mega Man games from Capcom. It uses various elements from the fifth Battle Network video game. It was never released outside Japan.
