= Mega Man: The Power Battle and The Power Fighters =

1995–1996 video game duology

Mega Man: The Power Battle Mega Man 2: The Power Fighters
- Arcade flyer for Mega Man: The Power Battle
- Developer: Capcom
- Publisher: Capcom
- Designer: Koji Ohkohara
- Programmer: Teruaki Hirokado
- Composers: Setsuo Yamamoto; Hideki Okugawa
- Series: Mega Man
- Platform: Arcade
- Release: The Power Battle: JP: October 1995; The Power Fighters: JP: August 1996
- Genre: Fighting
- Modes: Single-player, multiplayer
- Arcade system: CP System II; CP System (Power Battle)

Mega Man: The Power Battle (Note: known in Japan as Rockman: The Power Battle (ロックマン・ザ・パワーバトル, Rokkuman Za Pawā Batoru)) and Mega Man 2: The Power Fighters (Note: known in Japan as Rockman 2: The Power Fighters (ロックマン2・ザ・パワーファイターズ, Rokkuman Za Pawā Faitāzu)) are a pair of fighting games developed and published by Capcom for arcades. They are spin-off entries in the Mega Man series, and feature Mega Man and his allies fighting Doctor Wily and his Robot Masters in a series of boss battles. The Power Battle was first released in 1995, followed by The Power Fighters in 1996, which featured multiple gameplay enhancements.

Both games have since received home releases through various dedicated consoles and video game compilations. Two standalone compilations of the duology were released: Rockman Battle & Fighters, (Note: Japanese: ロックマン バトル&ファイターズ, Hepburn: Rokkuman Batoru Ando Faitāzu) for the Neo Geo Pocket Color in 2000, and Rockman: Power Battle Fighters, (Note: Japanese: ロックマン パワーバトルファイターズ, Hepburn: Rokkuman Pawā Batoru Faitāzu) for the PlayStation 2 in 2004.

Reception of The Power Battle was mixed due to its simplistic gameplay and low difficulty, but critics generally praised The Power Fighters for its improvements on the formula. The Battle & Fighters conversion received similarly mixed reception, with reviewers regarding it as interesting but ultimately inferior to the arcade originals.

== Gameplay ==
Bass fighting Cut Man in The Power Battle

Mega Man: The Power Battle and Mega Man 2: The Power Fighters are fighting games that can be played by a single player or two players cooperatively. Players choose between Mega Man, Proto Man, or Bass as their player character; a fourth character, Duo, is playable only in The Power Fighters. In each game, players must win six consecutive battles against a predetermined set of Robot Masters drawn from the first seven Mega Man games. Once all six have been defeated, the player characters are transported to Wily's Fortress for a penultimate battle against a sub-boss, such as the Yellow Devil, followed by a final battle with Doctor Wily. Both games offer three "stories" to choose from, which determine which Robot Masters and sub-boss will appear. The list of opponents differs between The Power Battle and The Power Fighters, though some Robot Masters appear in both games.

The games control similarly to the main Mega Man games — the player uses one button to jump, and one to fire the character's weapon. Players can perform a wall jump when at the edge of the screen, while holding the fire button charges the weapon in order to release a stronger blast. Holding down while pressing the jump button makes the character perform a dash, the properties of which vary between characters. Unlike other Mega Man games, instead of going through an entire stage and fighting the Robot Master as a boss at the end, the player faces the Robot Master immediately. Defeating a Robot Master earns the player their special weapon, which can be switched to by pressing a button, though only one character can receive the weapon in co-op play. As in most Mega Man games, each opponent is weak to another one's special weapon in the style of "rock-paper-scissors", allowing the player to do more damage by attacking them with the correct weapon. Each subsequent opponent is given a progressively larger health meter that must be depleted to win, while player characters' health recovers slightly after each battle. If a player's health is depleted, they must insert additional credits to continue playing.

The Power Fighters features several gameplay additions and refinements not seen in The Power Battle. All characters have been given their own special attack, performed by holding up and releasing a fully charged shot. While The Power Battle selects the players' next opponent using a roulette system, The Power Fighters lets the player choose freely between Robot Master stages, with Doctor Light offering hints as to their weaknesses. During battles, Robot Masters deploy additional enemies to assist them, as well as activate an "Overdrive" state after losing half their health; this alters their attack patterns and boosts their strength, defense, or speed. When the enemy enters Overdrive or the player uses a continue, Doctor Light's transport robot Eddie appears and produces an item to call a character-specific helper robot: Mega Man summons Rush, Bass summons Treble, and Proto Man and Duo both summon Beat. These helper robots can perform special abilities until their energy is depleted, though special weapons cannot be used while they are active.

Each character has a different epilogue that plays when the player defeats Doctor Wily, with The Power Fighters also including an epilogue for each possible combination of two characters in co-op play. These epilogues frequently allude to events from other Mega Man games, including Duo's appearance in the then-upcoming Mega Man 8 (1996) and Doctor Wily's creation of Zero from the Mega Man X series.

== Release ==
Mega Man 2: The Power Fighters (arcade flyer pictured) was released less than one year after its predecessor.

The Power Battle was released in arcades in late 1995, with The Power Fighters releasing less than one year later. Both games were built for Capcom's CPS-2 arcade board, though The Power Battle also received a CPS-1 version that lacks QSound support. The games were not widely distributed in the United States, and the CPS-2 version of The Power Battle was not released in English.

An adaptation of both games, Rockman Battle & Fighters, was released in Japan on July 26, 2000, for the Neo Geo Pocket Color. While the arcade games' art style is based on that of Mega Man 7 (1995), Battle & Fighters uses scaled down sprites based on those of the NES Mega Man games due to the system's limited processing power. By playing the game, players will randomly unlock entries in an in-game database for each of the main characters and bosses. Two players can use a link cable to transfer database information between systems, but no multiplayer play is supported. An emulated version was released worldwide for the Nintendo Switch on August 3, 2022, under the localized name Mega Man Battle & Fighters. The digital re-release omits the database transfer feature but adds the ability to rewind gameplay. The international release includes an English-translated instruction manual, but no in-game translation. This version was included as part of the Neo Geo Pocket Color Selection Vol. 2 compilation for Switch and Microsoft Windows later that year.

The arcade versions of both games would receive their first home console release in 2004 as two of the ten games featured in Mega Man Anniversary Collection, released in North America for PlayStation 2 and GameCube in June 2004 and Xbox in March 2005. In Japan, the two games were given a standalone compilation release for PlayStation 2 on August 5, 2004, titled Rockman: Power Battle Fighters. The Japanese compilation adds several unlockable features for each game, including a two-player versus mode, an "Extreme" mode that challenges players to defeat all of a game's bosses in sequence, and an "Extra" mode that allows players to toggle each game's settings, including game speed and ROM region. Power Battle Fighters was later digitally re-released for PlayStation 3 on January 18, 2017.

Both games have been re-released several times since via compilations, dedicated consoles, and other services. In 2006, The Power Battle and The Power Fighters were distributed via the GameTap streaming service on July 10 and July 26 respectively. Both games were playable on the Retro Station dedicated console in 2020, and were among the included games in the Capcom Arcade 2nd Stadium compilation in 2022. An Evercade Alpha Bartop Arcade machine containing both games was released in 2024. The Power Battle was also re-released via the Capcom Home Arcade dedicated console in 2019, and is playable in the Street Fighter 6 (2023) Game Center.

== Reception ==
Neil Foster of Hardcore Gaming 101 praised The Power Battle for its graphics and two-player support but criticized its lack of depth and difficulty, noting that "once the correct fighting order has been figured out, the game becomes rather easy to clear with one or two credits." Foster spoke positively of The Power Fighters, believing it was more challenging and fleshed out than The Power Battle. Alex Navarro of GameSpot, in his review of Mega Man Anniversary Collection, felt that The Power Battle and The Power Fighters were both worth playing despite their simplistic gameplay and lack of replay value. Reviewing Anniversary Collection, Jonathan Metts of Nintendo World Report found The Power Battle to be too easy thanks to opponents' "atrocious" AI, but thought The Power Fighters was a significant improvement over its predecessor, if still rudimentary. In a retrospective of every Mega Man game for 1UP.com, Jeremy Parish dismissed The Power Battle as "a sort of brain-dead take on the fighting genre", but recommended playing The Power Fighters due to its overall improvements.

Four reviewers for the Japanese publication Weekly Famitsu scored Power Battle Fighters on PlayStation 2 a total of 22 out of 40. In a ranking of every Mega Man game available on Nintendo Switch, Shaun Musgrave of TouchArcade put both arcade games and Battle & Fighters at the bottom of the list, stating that while not bad, players would likely not come back to them and they were "more of an interesting curio than anything at this point."

=== Battle & Fighters ===
Rockman Battle & Fighters

Aggregate score
Aggregator	Score
Metacritic	68/100 (NS)

Review scores
Publication	Score
Famitsu	23/40
Gamezebo	3.5/5
IGN	8/10
Nintendo Life	7/10
Nintendo Force Magazine	7.5/10

Critical reception for Rockman Battle & Fighters was mixed, according to review aggregation site Metacritic. Colin Williamson of IGN praised the game's adaptation of the arcade originals' gameplay and graphics, but was disappointed at the lack of multiplayer support. Jeremy Parish thought it was not worth playing over the arcade games, but considered it to be "a fun (and cute) portable diversion". Damien McFerran of Time Extension listed Rockman Battle & Fighters as the 10th best game for the Neo Geo Pocket Color. Reviewing the Switch re-release, David Oxford of Nintendo Force Magazine felt the Nintendo Switch re-release was worth a purchase for Mega Man or NGPC fans, but believed buying the original arcade versions via Capcom Arcade 2nd Stadium was a better deal.
