= Mega Man Battle Chip Challenge =

2003 video game

- North American box art
- Developers: Inti Creates; Capcom Production Studio 2
- Publisher: Capcom
- Directors: Yoshinori Kawano; Yoshihisa Tsuda
- Producers: Keiji Inafune; Takuya Aizu
- Designers: Kunihito Takashima; Go Maeda
- Programmers: Koji Okura; Toyohiro Serita; Hirokatsu Kawanishi
- Composer: Yusuke Beppu
- Series: Mega Man Battle Network
- Platforms: Game Boy Advance; WonderSwan Color
- Release: WonderSwan Color: JP: August 8, 2003; Game Boy Advance: JP: August 8, 2003; NA: March 2, 2004; EU: March 19, 2004
- Genre: Card battle
- Modes: Single-player, multiplayer

Mega Man Battle Chip Challenge (Note: Known in Japan as Rockman EXE Battle Chip GP (Japanese: ロックマンエグゼ バトルチップGP, Hepburn: Rokkuman Eguze Batoru Chippu Guran Puri)) is a video game developed by Inti Creates and published by Capcom for the Game Boy Advance (GBA) handheld game console. It is a spin-off title in the Mega Man Battle Network series. The game saw a simultaneous August 8, 2003 release in Japan on the WonderSwan Color and Swan Crystal titled Rockman EXE N1 Battle. (Note: Japanese: ロックマンエグゼ N1バトル) The GBA version was localized in North America and Europe the following March. The game was released on the Wii U's Virtual Console on July 30, 2014 in Japan, with both the North American and PAL region release occurring in August 2014.

Taking place within the timeline of the Battle Network series, Battle Chip Challenge involves a battling tournament called the "Battle Chip GP" among various pairs of online avatars called "NetNavis" and their human operators. Rather than directly control the player character through the traditional real-time tactical role-playing battles of the other Battle Network games, Battle Chip Challenge tasks the player with creating a "Program Deck" made up of abilities called "Battle Chips". The game randomly selects chips for the player and executes them in a duel with a computer-controlled opponent. Battle Chip Challenge suffered a relatively negative critical reception.

== Plot ==
The plot of Mega Man Battle Chip Challenge involves the opening of a new netbattling tournament known as the "Battle Chip GP". Yai is sponsoring the event while the others enter it. Even Chaud enters the tournament, but only for official business. It turns out that there is some type of new organization behind the scenes of the tournament who will delete the winning Navi and take its data for themselves.

== Gameplay ==
The Program Deck grid determines which chips are used each turn.

Mega Man Battle Chip Challenge utilizes a different battle system from other Battle Network titles. In those games, the player may battle one or more enemies in real-time by utilizing special abilities called "Battle Chips" with the objective being to delete each enemy's hit points (HP). In this game, the player duels a single opponent simply by setting up 12 Battle Chips on a grid called a "Program Deck". The Program Deck has three columns of chips, with the first column having two chips, the second having three chips, and the last having four chips. The game selects three chips at random on one of the grid's rows, and the player's Navi uses them consecutively, ending the turn with that character's signature attack. Battle Chips have a variety of effects such as attacking, healing, and elemental status changes. "Navi Chips" will even summon other characters into the battle for a short time. After setting the deck, the player has little control over the match. Battles progress almost completely autonomously for upwards of ten rounds while the player watches for results. At certain points during the fight, the player may "Slot In" two chips to change the outcome of the battle.

One possible outcome of a turn is the destruction of an opponent's Battle Chips. Certain types of attacks not only do damage to an opponent's HP, but to their Program Deck as well, as each chip also has a set amount of HP. The player can win fights not only by utilizing power, but by deleting an opponent's entire deck, making them unable to fight. If ten turns pass and neither competitor has lost all of their HP, the game determines the winner based on how many chips are left in their decks. The game also has an "Open Battle" feature in the game that allows the player to select a certain area with a set amount of consecutive battles to fight. Winning every fifth battle in one of these earns the player a new Navi Chip to use as well as a variable amount of "Zenny", the game's currency. Zenny can be used to purchase more chips from the character Higsby in the game's multiple shops. The game contains six different playable pairs of operators and their NetNavis including Lan and MegaMan, Dex and GutsMan, Mayl and Roll, and Chaud and ProtoMan. There are also two new duos: Kai and Turboman, and Mary and Ring. A multiplayer feature allows up to two players connect their GBAs for battles.

== Development ==
Mega Man Battle Chip Challenge was co-developed by Capcom Production Studio 2 and Inti Creates, the latter of which also developed Capcom's Mega Man Zero and Mega Man ZX series. The game was first announced by Capcom on April 19, 2003. It was subsequently shown at the World Hobby Fair in Japan on June 21, 2003. An English localization of the game was announced by Capcom on October 21, 2003.

== Reception ==
Reception

Aggregate scores
Aggregator	Score
GameRankings	49.90%
Metacritic	54 out of 100

Review scores
Publication	Score
1Up.com	C
Electronic Gaming Monthly	5.7 out of 10
Famitsu	27 out of 40 (GBA); 23 out of 40 (WS)
Game Informer	6 out of 10
GameSpot	8.2 out of 10
GameSpy	2 out of 5
IGN	4 out of 10
Nintendo Power	3.3 / 5

Mega Man Battle Chip Challenge was not well received by most reviewers, currently holding an average score of 49,90% on GameRankings and a 54 out of 100 on Metacritic. Most reviewers such as IGN and GameSpy (among others) criticized the game for a lack of both player participation, and overall presentation. IGN even went as far as calling it "quite possibly the worst game to bear the Mega Man name". Both reviews only praised the game's audio.

The GBA version of Mega Man Battle Chip Challenge was the 22nd best-selling game in Japan during its release week at 7,403 copies sold. A total of 44,844 copies of the game were sold in the region by the end of 2003 according to Famitsu.
