= Rockman EXE Battle Chip Stadium =

2005 video game

- Publisher(s): Capcom
- Platform(s): Arcade
- Release: Fall 2005 (JP) (Version 1); Spring 2006 (JP) (Version 2); Fall 2006 (JP) (Version 3)
- Genre(s): Real-time tactical role-playing game
- Mode(s): Single-player, multiplayer

Rockman EXE Battle Chip Stadium is an arcade game in the Mega Man Battle Network sub-series of Mega Man games from Capcom. This game was not released outside Japan. Under the name of "Battle Station", the arcade game was featured a number of times in episodes of the Rockman EXE Beast+ anime series.

== Gameplay ==
The game features much of the same gameplay found in the Battle Network series and was updated near monthly with new characters and attacks, as well as updating the hardware. Machines could be linked to allow players to face each other in NetBattles, showing their abilities over NetNavis. NetNavis featured included the so-called "Link Navis" from Rockman EXE 6, with the inclusion of other, exclusive NetNavis like Colonel, Falzar-Beast Forte and Dark Rockman.

After inserting the play cost of 100 yen, battling was started by slotting up to three merchandise Battle Chips into the machine per turn. Attacking was engaged by pressing a button, with the chips inserted having a chance of being successful, unsuccessful or critical (inflicting extra damage); this was made so to not make the game too easy by using potentially overpowered chips. Winning a round of the game dispensed a new, randomly picked Battle Chip from stock contained inside the arcade machine. Battle Chips given as prizes changed over time in 'volumes' and later versions/revisions of the game; not surprisingly, most of the Battle Chip range was obtainable from the game, including an amount of exclusives. Battle Chips won during play could also have a different colour casing.

Although most characters were playable, another way to use Battle Chips was slotting in a different kind of chip, the Navi Data Chip, through a separately marked chip port. Navi Data Chips could be leveled by gaining experience inside the arcade game or through using the LiNK PET_EX from the Beast lineup of merchandise. Using a Navi Data Chip allowed play with a leveled and hence stronger version of that Navi, when compared to the default in character select, or characters not present on the roster. Levels in the PET were proportional to levels in the game and in use with specific features in Battle Network 6.

The Program Advance system seen in the Rockman EXE series was expanded upon greatly for Battle Chip Stadium, with over 125 different sequences available. Use of Program Advances were governed by the same rules as all other chips, in whether they were a successful attack or not. Program Advances in Battle Chip Stadium were grouped in Mega-, Giga- and Tera- classes. To facilitate for performing these combination's, Capcom and Takara Tomy released specialized booster packs for the game containing specific Battle Chips in order to perform specific Program Advances.
