= Rockman EXE Legend of Network =

2006 video game

- Publisher: Capcom
- Platform: Mobile Phone
- Release: JP: October 7, 2006
- Genre: Real-time tactical role-playing game
- Mode: Single player

Rockman EXE Legend of Network (ロックマン エグゼ レジェンド オブ ネットワーク, Rokkuman Eguze Rejendo obu Nettowāku) is a 2006 video game in the Mega Man Battle Network series for mobile phones developed by Capcom. The game was only released and made available in Japan. It was preceded by the 2004 instalment, Rockman EXE Phantom of Network. The game introduces a new character named Cerise (シェリス, Sherisu), a Netopian.

31 December 2017 was the last day for cellphones to support this game, along with Phantom of Network. On 1 January 2018, the game was removed for Japanese Cellphones, making it more difficult to play.
