= Mega Man Battle Network (video game) =

2001 video game

- North American box art
- Developer: Capcom Production Studio 2
- Publishers: JP/NA: Capcom; EU: Ubisoft
- Director: Masahiro Yasuma
- Producer: Keiji Inafune
- Designers: Masahiro Yasuma; Masakazu Eguchi
- Programmers: Koetsu Matsuda; Hidekazu Shingaki; Michinori Kataoka; Mitsunori Sakano
- Artists: Hayato Kaji; Yuji Ishihara
- Writer: Shin Kurosawa
- Composer: Akari Kaida
- Series: Mega Man Battle Network
- Platform: Game Boy Advance
- Release: JP: March 21, 2001; NA: October 31, 2001; EU: November 30, 2001
- Genre: Real-time tactical role-playing
- Modes: Single-player, multiplayer

Mega Man Battle Network (Note: Known in Japan as Battle Network Rockman EXE (Japanese: バトルネットワーク ロックマンエグゼ, Hepburn: Batoru Nettowāku Rokkuman Eguze)) is a 2001 tactical role-playing game developed by Capcom for the Game Boy Advance (GBA) handheld console. It is the first title of the Mega Man Battle Network series of games. It was originally released in Japan as a GBA launch game on March 21, 2001 and was released later that year in North America and Europe. The game was re-released via the Wii U Virtual Console in Japan on July 9, 2014, in Europe on July 24, 2014, and in North America on July 31, 2014. In 2023, the game was re-released again as part of the Mega Man Battle Network Legacy Collection.

Battle Network takes place during the 21st century in a world where society and everyday life is driven by the Internet. Users are able to interact with and virtually explore nearly any electronic device using highly advanced online avatars called "NetNavis". The game follows an 11-year-old young boy named Lan Hikari and his NetNavi MegaMan.EXE as they solve a series of crimes instigated by the "WWW (World Three)" organization. While many previous entries in the wider Mega Man franchise feature platformer gameplay, Battle Network is instead a tactical role-playing game in which the player controls Lan in the game's outside world and MegaMan.EXE in its virtual world. Battles take place in real-time; special abilities called "Battle Chips" can be accessed to fight off the numerous computer viruses present in the game's cyberspace environments.

Battle Network was created amidst the rise of collectible card games, as shown by its collectible Battle Chips that are used to create "Folders" (like card decks). According to producer Keiji Inafune, the development team wanted Battle Network to specifically identify with younger gamers by creating a setting resembling the real world and a gameplay model that mixes traditional action and RPG elements. Battle Network received positive reviews from critics. Its unconventional combat system was given significant praise and its presentation was well-regarded. However, its storyline was met with mixed opinions. The game was followed by a number of sequels and spin-off titles, as well as other media, such as the manga and anime series MegaMan NT Warrior. An enhanced port of the game, Rockman.EXE: Operate Shooting Star (Note: Japanese: ロックマンエグゼ オペレート シューティングスター, Hepburn: Rokkuman Eguze Operēto Shūtingu Sutā), was released in Japan in 2009 for the Nintendo DS.

== Plot ==
Mega Man Battle Network is set in an ambiguous year in the 21st century ("20XX AD"), in an alternate reality parallel to the original Mega Man series. Within the world of Battle Network, the Net has become humanity's primary means of communication, commerce, and even crime. Users are able to "jack in" to the Net and other computerized devices and explore their various aspects by using (or "operating") program avatars called "NetNavis (Network Navigators)" as if they were physical locations. The Net and the inner workings of computers are displayed as a virtual world within which users (through their NetNavis) and computer programs can interact. Users often do so by communicating through a "PET (PErsonal information Terminal)" device. The plot of Mega Man Battle Network follows one such pair, Lan Hikari and his NetNavi MegaMan.EXE. Lan is an 11-year-old fifth grader in the town of ACDC. His father, Dr. Yuichiro Hikari, is one of the world's top scientists and NetNavi researchers. Throughout the story, Lan and MegaMan solve various criminal cases around ACDC involving other Navis and their operators. Some of the confrontations with the various criminals involve desperate, life-threatening situations including school students being re-educated as mindless slaves, the city's waterworks freezing over, oxygen being cut off at a large party, and a bus rigged to explode. The duo continuously crosses paths with Eugene Chaud, an official "NetBattler" commissioned by the government to investigate crimes on the Net. Chaud and his NetNavi, ProtoMan.EXE, act as rivals to Lan and MegaMan.EXE.

The main protagonists eventually learn that the criminals are all connected to an organization called the "WWW (World Three)". The WWW intentionally infects computer networks with computer viruses so as to hinder their normal operations and hack vital information. The group is led by Dr. Wily, a former colleague of Lan's late grandfather. While working together, Wily had specialized in robotics while Lan's grandfather specialized in networks, which eventually led to NetNavis. The government cut Wily's funding, opting instead to pursue Hikari's NetNavi project. Wily's goal throughout the game is to collect four super programs with which the "LifeVirus" may be constructed. The LifeVirus is a nearly indestructible virus capable of wiping out the Net and all associated devices. The main protagonists infiltrate the WWW, but MegaMan becomes disabled. Chaud arrives and gives Lan a batch file from Dr. Hikari to restore his Navi. After receiving the file "Hub.bat", Lan questions his father about the name. It is revealed the MegaMan is actually a unique Navi made by Lan's father. When Lan's twin brother, Hub Hikari, died from a heart trouble at a young age, Dr. Hikari transferred Hub's consciousness into the NetNavi MegaMan. This created a special physical and virtual bond between the two twin brothers. In the end, Lan and MegaMan manage to defeat Wily, destroy the LifeVirus, and restore peace to ACDC and the world.

== Gameplay ==
Battles take place on a three-by-six grid. The player selects a Cannon Battle Chip for MegaMan.EXE (left) while fighting two viruses.

Unlike the previous action-platformer entries of the Mega Man franchise, Mega Man Battle Network is a real-time tactical RPG. To progress through the game the player must alternate between navigating the outside world as Lan Hikari and exploring the Net as MegaMan.EXE, with each environment containing certain tasks that must be completed to allow advancement in the other. Controlling Lan, the player may travel around the world map, interact with non-player characters, check email, purchase items, initiate Net missions, or speak with MegaMan.EXE through his PET. In contrast with traditional Mega Man entries in which battle and movement through the levels happen in the same setting, Battle Network's combat occurs only through by battling computer viruses within the Net. This cyber world is represented by a series of branching pathways and nodes, where MegaMan.EXE can travel to both new and previously visited locations, find and purchase items, and fight viruses. Battles do not generally appear on the field screen of the Net but are usually set as random encounters. The battlefield itself is made up of 18 tiles divided into two groups of nine, one group being space in which MegaMan.EXE may freely move and the other group being space inhabited by enemies. Like other Mega Man games, MegaMan.EXE possesses an arm cannon called the "Mega Buster". The player can move between the nine provided tiles and fire the Mega Buster at enemies from across the screen. The objective of each battle is to delete all the viruses by reducing their hit points (HP) to zero. If MegaMan.EXE's own health depletes, a game over occurs. Certain power-up programs can be found that upgrade MegaMan.EXE's HP, defense, or Mega Buster power.

The Mega Buster is initially quite weak on its own, so in order to delete viruses more efficiently, the player must access special abilities called "Battle Chips". These are minor programs that contain data that the Navi can utilize to perform more powerful attacks, summon other Navis for help, or execute supportive actions such as restoring HP or destroying tiles on the enemies' side of the battlefield. Battle Chips are uploaded to MegaMan.EXE by Lan's PET in a process called "Customization." Each turn in battle presents the player with five random Chips from which to choose, though the player is limited to Chips of the same variety or Chips with the same alphabetic code. Once the "Battle Gauge" (or "Custom Gauge") at the top of the screen fills during battle, another random set of Chips can be chosen from a general pool called the "folder". At any given time, the player may only have exactly 30 Chips in the folder from which the Customization process may draw. The player is only allowed to carry up to ten of the same kind of Chip and up to five Navi-summon Chips in the folder. However, a player may possess any number of other Chips in inactive reserve, called the "sack", which may be moved to the active folder outside of battle. Every Chip and enemy is aligned to one of five elements: Neutral, Fire, Water, Electric, and Wood. If MegaMan.EXE hits an enemy with an attack aligned to an element they are weak against, the attack will do double damage.

Battle Network also features a very limited multiplayer option. Up to two players may connect with each other using a Game Link Cable and then give or trade Battle Chips. Players may also engage in battles with one another. The "test battle" mode has no stakes, whereas the "real battle" mode allows the winning player to take a Battle Chip from the loser.

== Development and release ==
Initially conceptualized with the intention of being a horror game, Mega Man Battle Network was developed by Capcom Production Studio 2 amidst the success of Nintendo's portable RPG franchise Pokémon. Rather than extend upon the traditional action-platform formula for the Mega Man series as they had done with the 3D Mega Man Legends, Capcom followed Nintendo's example on the latter's then-newest handheld console, the Game Boy Advance (GBA). While creating Battle Network, director Masahiro Yasuma found difficulty in blending action attributes with "the kind of fun you get from a Pokémon game" in order to make it enjoyable, new, and fresh. Yasuma recalled that production was further challenged because no effective precursor of its type had been made before. Producer Keiji Inafune stated that the development team wanted to add a "real world" feel to the Mega Man series by placing the protagonist of Battle Network in a location where the Internet is prevalent. With the release of the portable GBA, the team felt that they should target modern gamers, specifically children, as an audience for the new series. The developers thought such a theme would be both successful and relevant because these younger gamers grew up with and utilized such technology on a daily basis. To ensure the game's popularity, Capcom marketed Battle Network alongside an afternoon anime adaptation, emphasized head-to-head matches between players, and provided fans with exclusive content via special events.

Hayato Kaji was responsible for redesigning the protagonist Mega Man as MegaMan.EXE for the Battle Network series. The character's initial concept art went through a large number of changes before it was finalized to a much simpler design, so that even very young fans could easily draw it. Kaji and Yuji Ishihara acted as the primary character designers for the game. Each of the game's boss characters was designed so that their bodies would exude a certain motif; for example, StoneMan.EXE was meant to look like a huge castle made from stone masonry. Some bosses resembled their original Mega Man series counterparts, while others were a large departure from these more humanoid appearances. Ishihara explained that the artists chose size and shape variety among the characters to "provide a little bit of surprise and excitement" to fans familiar with their classic forms. The musical score for Battle Network was composed by Akari Kaida, who would later work on the fifth installment of the series. All 22 musical tracks for Mega Man Battle Network were included on the Rockman EXE 1 ~ 3 Game Music Collection, released in Japan by Suleputer on December 18, 2002.

The Japanese version of Battle Network was first announced in August 2000 as one of four games set to be released for the recently unveiled GBA. A demo of the game was promoted at Nintendo Space World that month, where it was displayed on only two out of the 140 playable consoles. The game was displayed on five kiosks at the Tokyo Game Show the following month. According to series planners Masakazu Eguchi and Masahiro Yasuma, this beta build of the game involved the player fighting a malevolent WoodMan.EXE within the school's electronic blackboard. Battle Network was officially released in Japan as a GBA launch title on March 21, 2001. A television advertisement of the game featured the song "Neo Venus" by Japanese rock band Janne Da Arc. The English localization of Battle Network was announced on May 17, 2001, just prior to the Electronic Entertainment Expo. The game was released in North America and Europe on October 31 and November 30 respectively. Ubisoft published Mega Man Battle Network in PAL regions as part of a seven-GBA game licensing agreement with Capcom. Its first sequel, Mega Man Battle Network 2, was announced before the Japan World Hobby Fair in June 2001. Attendees to the fair were able to download Chip data for the character Bass.EXE into their original Battle Network cartridges.

== Reception and legacy ==
Reception

Aggregate scores
Aggregator	Score
GameRankings	79.53%
Metacritic	79/100

Review scores
Publication	Score
Electronic Gaming Monthly	6/10
Famitsu	30/40
Game Informer	8.25/10
GameSpot	8.3/10
GameSpy	84/100
IGN	8.5/10
Nintendo Power	4/5

Mega Man Battle Network has been generally well-received, holding aggregates score of 80% on GameRankings and 79 out of 100 on Metacritic. The graphics of Battle Network were overall favored by reviewers. IGN's Craig Harris, GameSpy contributor James Fudge, and Kristian Brogger of Game Informer were all impressed by the game's crisp, colorful style and futuristic locales. As far as the sound was concerned, Justin Speer of GameSpot opined that the music appropriately matched the rich visuals. Brogger otherwise accepted the sound as "enough [...] to get by", but that nothing would be missed if it were turned off. Harris comparably stated that "the standard Japanese tunage could have been given a bit more variety". The reviewers gave mixed opinions of the game's storyline. Though Brogger called it "engrossing", Harris recognized the plot as the game's one major fault, describing it as "kiddy" and disliking the consistent use of computer terminology for character names. Speer similarly summarized, "If there's something that might hold you back from enjoying the game, it's the lighthearted and somewhat goofy story. However, the game doesn't take itself too seriously, so neither should you."

The battle system of Battle Network was a positive stand-out aspect for many critics. In his Battle Network series decade retrospective, 1UP.com's Jeremy Parish felt the first game suffered from terrible plotting, unbalanced play design, and unattractive and annoying environment navigation. Still, Parish perceived the game's combat mechanics to be its sole reason for success, marrying the original Mega Man action qualities with an RPG structure and requiring "a combination of sharp thinking and quick reflexes" on the player's part. Speer found battle within the game to rightfully capture the spirit of Mega Man as its "most original and compelling feature". Harris likewise regarded the battle interface to be well-designed, a refreshing change from traditional Japanese RPGs, what gives the game its charm, and a very appreciative addition to the game's limited multiplayer mode. Fudge summarized the combat as "very easy to learn, but difficult to master -- and yet very satisfying". He admitted that the random encounters can occasionally be overwhelming. Brogger considered the gameplay both deep and simple to pick up on, but thought the menu system to be "clunky" at times and its battles to be repetitive.

Mega Man Battle Network entered Japanese sales charts at number 12, selling approximately 43,048 units during its first week. A total of 224,837 units were sold in Japan during 2001, with the game being listed by Dengeki Online as the 50th best-selling video game in the region for that year. The success of Mega Man Battle Network led to several sequels and spin-offs on other consoles, mobile phones, and arcade; the manga and anime series MegaMan NT Warrior; and numerous pieces of merchandise. A successor series called Mega Man Star Force began in 2006 after Capcom decided to stop developing new Battle Network titles.

== Rockman.EXE: Operate Shooting Star ==
Box art of Rockman.EXE: Operate Shooting Star

A Nintendo DS port of the game entitled Rockman.EXE: Operate Shooting Star was revealed at the 2009 World Hobby Fair in Japan, and released there on November 12, 2009. Christian Svensson, Capcom's then Vice President of Strategic Planning & Business Development, stated that the company had no plans to localize the game for Western territories, but a fan translation of the game into English was released in 2018, as well as an optional voice acting removal patch.

Geo Stelar as Star Force Mega Man traversing the internet. The bottom screen displays the map.

In addition to various gameplay enhancements, it also features a crossover with the Mega Man Star Force series, and the ability to control either Mega Man. Star Force Mega Man brings his ability to lock-on to far-away targets, as well as a brief shield to block minor attacks. Both Mega Men utilize Battle Chips instead of Battle Cards, and new Chips (including a Navi Chip representing Omega-Xis) appear. The PET interface was revamped to allow for touchscreen capabilities, including a map while traversing the cyber world, similar to its implementation in Double Team DS.

In January 2009, monthly Japanese magazine CoroCoro Comic held their annual Mega Man boss design contest. However, unlike previous contests, it was unknown what upcoming Mega Man title the winning boss would appear in, nor was it revealed even after the winner was announced as Clock Genius in the April 2009 issue. At the 2009 World Hobby Fair convention in Japan, the new Mega Man title was finally unveiled as a crossover between the Battle Network and Star Force series.

The Battle Network series officially ended in 2005 with the release of Mega Man Battle Network 6 for the Game Boy Advance. Around the 20th anniversary of the Mega Man franchise, Capcom was receiving a strong sentiment from fans wanting a new Battle Network title. Series producer Takeshi Horinouchi stated that they wanted one more try at the series. He explained, "This game’s inspiration is actually a celebratory image drawn by the designer for Mega Man’s 20th anniversary. From that time, I’d secretly been thinking 'In time we should try something neat with EXE and Star Force.’ Thus, our next project Rockman EXE Operate Shooting Star has come to be started. Essentially, this is a Mega Man Battle Network 1 remake for the DS, porting it and adding something extra. You the fans may be wondering, what sort of theme comes with combining EXE and Shooting Star? This is something that Battle Network fans of course, and Star Force fans as well, will enjoy."

According to the Japanese publication Famitsu, Rockman.EXE: Operate Shooting Star was the ninth best-selling game in Japan during its release week at approximately 23,000 copies sold. A total of 44,110 units were sold in Japan by the end of 2009.
