= Mega Man 4 =

1991 video game

- North American box art
- Developer: Capcom
- Publishers: JP/NA: Capcom; EU: Nintendo
- Director: Yoshinori Takenaka
- Producer: Tokuro Fujiwara
- Designers: Yoshinori Takenaka; S. Kobashi; Keiji Inafune
- Programmer: Tadashi Kuwana
- Artists: Keiji Inafune; Hayato Kaji; Kazunori Tazaki
- Composer: Minae Fujii
- Series: Mega Man
- Platforms: Nintendo Entertainment System; PlayStation; Mobile phone; Android; iOS
- Release: December 6, 1991: Famicom / NES; JP: December 6, 1991; NA: January 1992; EU: August 1993 PlayStation; JP: October 28, 1999 Mobile phone; JP: September 1, 2005 Android, iOS; WW: January 5, 2017
- Genre: Platform
- Mode: Single-player

Mega Man 4 (Note: known in Japan as Rockman 4: A New Evil Ambition!! (ロックマン4 新(あら)たなる野望(やぼう)!!, Rokkuman 4 Aratanaru Yabou!!; lit. "Rockman 4: A New Ambition!!")) (stylized as Mega Man IV) is a 1991 platform game developed and published by Capcom for the Nintendo Entertainment System. It is the fourth installment of the original Mega Man series and was originally released in Japan on December 6, 1991. The game was released in North America the following January, and in Europe in August 1993 by Nintendo.

The game's story takes place after the third defeat and supposed death of Dr. Wily in Mega Man 3, and features the Earth coming under threat from the mysterious Russian scientist Dr. Cossack and his eight "Robot Masters". Fearing the worst, Dr. Light sends Mega Man to save the world once again. Mega Man 4 carries on the same action and platforming gameplay as the first three games, in which the player completes a series of stages in any order and adds the weapon of each stage's boss to Mega Man's arsenal. One notable added feature is the "New Mega Buster" (often shortened to "Mega Buster"), an upgraded arm cannon that lets the player charge a regular shot into a much more powerful blast. The development team was mindful that this innovation would change the overall feel of the game.

Similarly to its predecessors Mega Man 4 was remade for PlayStation in Japan. In later years it appeared on mobile phones and as part of game compilations, including Mega Man Anniversary Collection. The emulated versions were also released through PlayStation Network and Virtual Console. The game received positive reviews overall, with critics praising its tried-and-true gameplay formula, but feeling that it was not as good or innovative as its predecessors. A sequel, Mega Man 5, was released in 1992.

== Plot ==
Mega Man 4 takes place in an unspecified year during the 21st century, described as the year "20XX". One year after the events of Mega Man 3, a mysterious Russian scientist, Dr. Cossack, unleashes an army of robots with the intention of world domination, much like Dr. Wily before him. Concerned over the situation, Dr. Light calls upon his own greatest creation, the hero Mega Man, to go after Cossack's Robot Masters, who have seized control of eight cities. He also creates the support robot Eddie and equips Mega Man with the New Mega Buster, an upgrade for his Mega Buster.

Upon defeating the eight Robot Masters — Toad Man, Bright Man, Pharaoh Man, Ring Man, Dust Man, Skull Man, Dive Man, and Drill Man — Mega Man makes his way to Cossack's icy fortress. However, in the middle of his battle with Cossack, Mega Man's brother Proto Man teleports in with Cossack's daughter, Kalinka. The girl begs Mega Man to stop fighting and explained that Dr. Wily had kidnapped her, forcing her father to build an army of robots and antagonize Mega Man as ransom. With Wily's plan undone by Proto Man, he steps out of the shadows, furious for his betrayal. Mega Man pursues his nemesis and fights through the scientist's Wily Castle, but Wily manages to escape in the end. Mega Man escapes as the fortress begins to self-destruct, and rides home on the top of a passing train, where he is greeted by Roll and Rush.

== Gameplay ==
Mega Man fires a Mega Buster blast at Toad Man. Holding down the firing button charges the arm cannon to release a powerful shot.

Mega Man 4 features similar gameplay to the previous three games. The player must complete a series of eight stages in an order of the player's choosing. The protagonist, Mega Man, is able to run, jump, shoot, and climb his way past obstacles and enemies; the game also retains the slide ability which debuted in Mega Man 3. At the end of each stage is a Robot Master boss. Upon defeating a Robot Master, Mega Man gains the Robot Master's signature weapon, which can then be used by the player in subsequent stages. Once all eight Robot Masters are destroyed, two separate sets of linear stages must be completed to finish the game. One major addition to the gameplay in Mega Man 4 is the "New Mega Buster", an upgraded version of Mega Man's arm cannon. By holding down the firing button, the player can now charge a shot, resulting in a blast far more powerful than the standard shot. This feature was later used in subsequent incarnations of the franchise.

The hero's dog Rush makes a return from Mega Man 3 with the ability to transform into "Coil", "Jet", and "Marine" modes for navigating different environments. Aside from Rush, two additional support items called the "Wire Adaptor" and the "Balloon Adaptor" also aid the player in reaching areas not normally accessible. However, these hidden adaptors must be found in the stages rather than being awarded for defeating a Robot Master. Like the Master Weapons, the three Rush modes and the two adaptors are each limited to an amount of weapon power that drains when in use. The character "Flip Top" Eddie is introduced in Mega Man 4. Eddie, who went on to appear in later Mega Man games, provides the player with a random item (such as health, ammunition, or an E-Tank) at designated points in some of the levels.

== Development ==
Mega Man series artist Keiji Inafune, credited as "Inafking", stated that the development team had very few problems while working on Mega Man 4. Inafune designed Dr. Cossack and Kalinka as two new storyline characters for the game. Cossack, who was originally named "Dr. Vice", was made much younger than Dr. Light and Dr. Wily. Inafune also considered giving him American traits, but decided upon influences from Russia instead. Kalinka was created because so many male characters already existed in the series at this point. However, Inafune did not intend for players to compare her to Mega Man's sister Roll. The idea for Eddie originally came about during the development of Mega Man 2. Eddie was designed as a supporting character that "would behave like a lottery", either pleasantly surprising or disappointing the player with the item he gives Mega Man.

Mega Man 4 was the first game in the series for Hayato Kaji, credited as "K. Hayato", a prominent designer for many later Mega Man games. Kaji was responsible for the chargeable Mega Buster, a gameplay mechanic that would become a staple of the series. "We knew adding a two-level or three-level charge would change the whole flavor of the game in some respects, and we were very mindful of that," Inafune explained. The Robot Masters in Mega Man 4 are a result of a design contest for fans held in Japan. With over 70,000 character submissions, the development team spent an extended period of time narrowing them down to only eight bosses. According to Kaji, the team was very satisfied with many of the chosen designs and almost no changes were made to their original illustrations. They were so impressed with Skull Man that they scrapped an entire level being created just so they could restart it and devote it to that Robot Master. The winning eight contestants of the design contest were each issued a special "golden cartridge" edition of Mega Man 4. As there are only eight of these cartridges in existence, they are extremely rare and fetch a large collector's price today. The musical score for Mega Man 4 was composed by Minae Fujii, credited as "Ojalin", while the sound programming and sound effects were handled by Yasuaki Fujita, credited as "Bun Bun", who had composed the soundtrack for Mega Man 3 the previous year.

== Reception and legacy ==
Reception

Review scores
Publication	Score
Electronic Gaming Monthly	8/10, 8/10, 8/10, 8/10
Famitsu	6/10, 7/10, 7/10, 7/10
GamePro	5/5
IGN	8/10
Nintendo Magazine System	81%
Total!	88%
Hippon Super!	8/10

Award
Publication	Award
Nintendo Power Awards '92	Best Overall Game (NES)

In Japan, Ichiro Tezuka writing for Hippon Super! said that the additions made to gameplay, such as Rush the dog were designed just to give the impression that the game was an improvement on its previous games. He ultimately recommended the game saying that Mega Man 4 was still a game that surpasses the standard on action games and recommended for players who would have patience for its high difficulty.

Mega Man 4 has received mostly positive critical reviews. Reviews contemporary with the game's release by the United States magazine Nintendo Power and the United Kingdom publications Nintendo Magazine System and Total! all found Mega Man 4 to have high quality graphics, sound, and gameplay. However, they also noted very little improvement over previous entries in the series. GamePro was satisfied with the lack of changes. "Mega Man 4 continues the tradition — crazed robot baddies, good character graphics, great background art and warped, mechanical music," the reviewer said. "When you have a good game, why make radical changes? Capcom sticks to the blueprints in Mega Man 4 — guaranteeing happiness for Mega Man fans everywhere."

Mega Man 4 made it into IGN's "Top 100 NES Games" list at number 95, with staff writer Matt Casamassina praising its attempt at better narrative and an essentially similar experience to the first three Mega Man games. Lucas M. Thomas of IGN stated that, as a stand-alone title, the game is one of the best experiences available from the NES library, although not when compared to its superior predecessors. He enjoyed the use of a second set of castle levels to significantly extend the length of the game, a tradition carried on by the next two titles in the series.

Numerous video game journalists and enthusiasts including Thomas, Craig Skistimas of ScrewAttack, GameSpot editors Christian Nutt and Justin Speer, and 1UP.com's Jeremy Parish, refer to the fourth installment as a turning point for the quality of titles in the Mega Man series. Nutt and Speer admitted that the series was beginning to deteriorate with this game, likely due to the growing reputation of the more powerful Super Nintendo Entertainment System at the time of its release. Parrish proclaimed, "Here's where the series starts to go off the rails a bit -- the Dr. Wily fake out was silly, the music was terrible, the bosses and weapons were uninspired, and the ability to charge up the Mega Buster is often cited as a game-breaking innovation." Thomas identified the chargeable Mega Buster as disrupting the balance of the game and rendering many of the Master Weapons useless, one of the concepts that set the Mega Man games apart from other action-platformers.

Mega Man 4 was re-released for the PlayStation as part of the Rockman Complete Works series in 1999. This version of the game features a special "navi mode" that guides players through each level and has arranged music remixes. A port of the Complete Works edition was released on the PlayStation 2 and GameCube in 2004 and the Xbox in 2005, as part of the North American-exclusive Mega Man Anniversary Collection. The NES version has also been re-released on Japanese i-mode mobile phones in 2005, worldwide on the Wii's downloadable Virtual Console service in 2010, and on the Japanese PlayStation Network in 2011.

A fanmade ROM hack of Mega Man 4 known as Rockman 4 Minus Infinity (R4MI) was released in mid-2012. Created by developer PureSabe, the ROM hack has received positive reception for its extreme difficulty and creative transformation of the original game's source material.
