= Music of the Mega Man Zero series =

The music of the Mega Man Zero series, a series of four video games for the Game Boy Advance set in Capcom's Mega Man video game franchise, known as the Rockman Zero series within Japan, consists of the soundtracks to the four games, as well as the released albums associated with them. The music to Mega Man Zero, the first game, was composed by Ippo Yamada with one track by Setsuo Yamamoto; the music of Mega Man Zero 2 was composed by Yamada, Masaki Suzuki, Luna Umegaki, Chicken Mob, and Tsutomu Kurihara; the soundtrack of Mega Man Zero 3 was composed by Yamada, Suzuki, Kurihara, and Umegaki; and Mega Man Zero 4's music was composed by Yamada, Suzuki, Umegaki, and Shinichi Itakura.

The soundtracks for the first three games were released together as the Rockman Zero 1~3 Game Music Collection in 2004. Albums of remixed music have been released for each game, all in 2004, with Remastered Tracks Rockman Zero for the first, Remastered Tracks Rockman Zero Idea for the second, Remastered Tracks Rockman Zero Telos for the third, and Remastered Tracks Rockman Zero Physis for Rockman 4. A fifth album, Remastered Tracks Rockman Zero Mythos was released in 2010 to correspond with the release of the Mega Man Zero Collection compilation for the Nintendo DS. Remastered Tracks Rockman Zero, Telos, and Physis include in addition to their musical tracks several radio drama tracks, in which voice actors play in a drama whose story is related to the associated game.

== Albums ==
=== Rockman Zero Game Music Complete Works -Rockman Zero 1~3- ===
Rockman Zero Game Music Complete Works -Rockman Zero 1~3-

Soundtrack album by Various artists
- Released: July 1, 2004
- Genre: Video game soundtrack
- Length: 2:25:03
- Label: Suleputer

Rockman Zero Game Music Complete Works - Rockman Zero 1~3- is a soundtrack album which contains music from Mega Man Zero, Mega Man Zero 2, and Mega Man Zero 3. The tracks were composed by Ippo Yamada, Luna Umegaki, Chicken Mob, Masaki Suzuki, Tsutomu Kurihara, and Makoto Tomozawa, though "Theme of ZERO", taken from the soundtrack of Mega Man X, was composed by Setsuo Yamamoto. The album was published by Suleputer on July 1, 2004 with the catalog numbers CPCA-1092/3 . The two-disc album contains 103 tracks and covers a duration of 2:25:03. The album presents the tracks separated by game, with the Zero 2 tracks split by the disc boundary.

Track list

Disc 1
No.	Title	Length
1.	"Title" (Intro)	0:11
2.	"Crash - Short Loop -"	0:59
3.	"The Ruins of Lab"	1:24
4.	"Captive Legend"	1:01
5.	"Cyberelf"	0:57
6.	"Theme of ZERO" (from Rockman X)	1:05
7.	"Intermission"	1:11
8.	"Resistance"	1:06
9.	"EXPRESS UG"	1:07
10.	"Deadzone"	2:08
11.	"Scorching Desert"	1:38
12.	"Hell Plant"	1:17
13.	"Infiltration"	2:11
14.	"Emergency"	1:07
15.	"Guarder Room"	0:31
16.	"Crash"	1:35
17.	"Result of Mission"	0:47
18.	"Enemy Hall"	2:44
19.	"Neo Arcadia"	1:43
20.	"X, The Legend"	2:08
21.	"Fake"	2:11
22.	"The End of Legend"	0:54
23.	"For Endless Fight"	1:38
24.	"End Title"	0:06
25.	"Area of ZERO / Main Theme of ZERO"	3:30
26.	"Title II"	0:06
27.	"For Endless Fight II"	1:08
28.	"Departure"	1:38
29.	"Crash II"	1:38
30.	"X, The Legend"	2:08
31.	"Resistance Force"	1:46
32.	"Momentary Peace"	1:41
33.	"Labo"	1:53
34.	"Instructions"	1:42
35.	"Ice Brain"	2:03
36.	"Platinum"	1:16
37.	"Gravity"	1:25
38.	"Sand Triangle"	2:58
39.	"Imminent Storm"	1:43
40.	"Cyberelf"	0:57
41.	"Neo Arcadia II"	1:48
42.	"Power Born"	1:18
43.	"Uneasy"	1:53
44.	"Spreading Darkness"	1:38
45.	"Combustion"	1:23
46.	"Cool Water"	1:25
47.	"Passionate"	1:21
48.	"Flash Back"	1:35
49.	"Guarder Room"	0:31
50.	"Strong Will"	1:43
51.	"Result of Mission II"	0:49
52.	"Melt Down"	1:16
53.	"Cool Hearted Fellow"	1:17

Disc 2
No.	Title	Length
1.	"The Cloudy Stone"	1:23
2.	"Harpuia"	0:57
3.	"The End of Legend"	0:49
4.	"Silver Wolf - Yggr-drasill -"	1:45
5.	"Darkelf"	1:24
6.	"Supreme Ruler"	1:33
7.	"The Last - The Wish Punished -"	1:48
8.	"In Mother's Light"	2:42
9.	"Awakening Will"	3:36
10.	"Red Time" (2 Player Mode Edit)	1:00
11.	"Title III"	0:09
12.	"Neo Arcadia March"	1:31
13.	"Forbidden Ark"	2:40
14.	"Break Out"	1:13
15.	"Darkness over World"	1:40
16.	"Exiled One -Omega-"	0:54
17.	"Omega Battle"	1:18
18.	"Curse of Bile"	1:43
19.	"Prismatic"	1:56
20.	"Visor Eyes"	1:33
21.	"Volcano"	1:22
22.	"Water City"	1:15
23.	"Reborn Mechanics"	1:18
24.	"Old Space Life"	1:13
25.	"Créer and Prier"	1:01
26.	"Crash III"	1:18
27.	"X, The Legend"	2:08
28.	"Final Count Down"	1:13
29.	"Omega Missile"	1:25
30.	"Darkelf"	1:33
31.	"For Endless Fight III"	2:23
32.	"Sand Triangle II"	3:08
33.	"Infiltration II"	1:28
34.	"Neo Arcadia III"	2:28
35.	"Cold Smile"	1:34
36.	"Trail on Powdery Snow"	1:56
37.	"Submerged Memory"	1:33
38.	"High-Speed Lift"	1:13
39.	"Guarder Room"	0:29
40.	"Scrapped Beat"	1:13
41.	"Result of Mission III"	0:48
42.	"Hell's Gate Open"	1:58
43.	"Curse of Bile" (Stage Version)	1:13
44.	"Judgement Day"	2:06
45.	"Return to Zero"	1:07
46.	"Apocalypse Now"	0:57
47.	"Cannon Ball"	1:18
48.	"I, 0 Your Fellow"	1:48
49.	"Everlasting Red"	2:51
50.	"Labo |System-a-Ciel|"	1:04

=== Remastered Tracks Rockman Zero ===
Remastered Tracks Rockman Zero

Soundtrack album by Ippo Yamada
- Released: January 23, 2004
- Genre: Video game soundtrack
- Length: 56:52
- Label: Inti Creates

Remastered Tracks Rockman Zero is a soundtrack album which contains almost all remixed game tracks from Mega Man Zero, plus some drama tracks which explain events that occurred during the game. The majority of the tracks were composed by Ippo Yamada, though "Theme of ZERO", taken from the soundtrack of Mega Man X, was composed by Setsuo Yamamoto. The album was published by Inti Creates on January 23, 2004 with the catalog number INTIR-001. The album was released six months before the Rockman Zero 1~3 album, making it the first release of music from the game. It contains 26 tracks, of which 5 are drama tracks rather than songs, and covers a duration of 56:52. The drama tracks are marked in their official titles with a "*".

Literal translation of the original titles appear in (brackets) if different

Track list
No.	Title	Japanese title	Length
1.	"Title"	タイトル	0:16
2.	"*Ciel's Memory _ Prologue"	*Ciel's Memory _ Prologue	1:44
3.	"The ruins of lab" (Ruins)	遺跡	2:15
4.	"Captive Legend"	伝説の虜囚	1:44
5.	"Cyberelf"	サイバーエルフ	1:12
6.	"Theme of ZERO (from Rockman X)"	ゼロのテーマ (from Rockman X)	2:15
7.	"Guarder Room"	ガーダールーム	1:38
8.	"Crash"	クラッシュ	2:26
9.	"Result of Mission" (Results)	リザルト	0:48
10.	"*Ciel's Memory _ Rebirth from ZERO"	*Ciel's Memory _ Rebirth from ZERO	1:10
11.	"Intermission"	インターミッション	2:19
12.	"Resistance"	レジスタンス	2:12
13.	"Express UG" (Underground Express)	アンダーグランドエキスプレス	2:12
14.	"Deadzone"	デッドゾーン	3:07
15.	"Scorching Desert"	灼熱の砂漠	3:27
16.	"*Ciel's Memory _ The Big Four"	*Ciel's Memory _ The Big Four	1:56
17.	"Hell Plant"	ヘルプラント	1:52
18.	"Infiltration"	潜入	2:35
19.	"Emergency"	緊急事態	1:09
20.	"Enemy Hall"	エネミーホール	3:06
21.	"Neo Arcadia"	ネオ・アルカディア	2:10
22.	"*Ciel's Memory _ Truth of Hero"	*Ciel's Memory _ Truth of Hero	2:01
23.	"Fake"	フェイク	2:55
24.	"*Ciel's Memory _ Epilogue"	*Ciel's Memory _ Epilogue	1:46
25.	"For Endless Fight"	果てしなき戦いへ	4:55
26.	"Area of ZERO / Main Theme of ZERO" (Area of Zero)	ゼロの領域	3:42

=== Remastered Tracks Rockman Zero: Idea ===
Remastered Tracks Rockman Zero: Idea

Soundtrack album by Various artists
- Released: May 28, 2004
- Genre: Video game soundtrack
- Length: 1:52:22
- Label: Inti Creates

Remastered Tracks Rockman Zero: Idea is a soundtrack album which contains remixed game tracks from Mega Man Zero 2, plus some remixes of extra tracks not included in the game. The tracks were composed and remixed by Ippo Yamada, Luna Umegaki, Masaki Suzuki, Chicken Mob, and Tsutomu Kurihara. The two-disc album was published by Inti Creates on May 28, 2004 with the catalog numbers INTIR-002/3. It contains 40 tracks and covers a duration of 1:52:22.

Track list

Literal translation of the original titles appear in (brackets) if different

Disc 1
No.	Title	Japanese title	Length
1.	"Title II"	タイトル2	0:08
2.	"For Endless Fight II" (Prologue - For an Endless Fight)	プロローグ-果てしなき戦いへ	1:56
3.	"Departure"	デパーチャー	2:15
4.	"Crash II"	クラッシュ2	3:56
5.	"Result of Mission II" (Results 2)	リザルト2	2:37
6.	"X, The Legend" (X's Theme)	エックスのテーマ	1:55
7.	"Resistance Force" (Resistance)	レジスタンス	2:53
8.	"Momentary Peace" (Warrior's Respite)	戦士の休息	3:09
9.	"Lab"	ラボ	3:36
10.	"Red Time - 2 Player Mode Edit -" (Communication War Mode)	通信対戦モード	0:35
11.	"Instructions"	インストラクション	2:02
12.	"Sand Triangle"	サンド・トライアングル	3:32
13.	"Strong Will"	ストロング・ウィル	2:07
14.	"Imminent Storm - Uneasy arrange -" (Coming Storm)	迫る嵐	2:13
15.	"Ice Brain"	アイスブレイン	3:01
16.	"Gravity"	グラヴィティ	2:54
17.	"Platinum"	プラチナ	3:01
18.	"Mark of Justice - Resistance Anthem - (EX track)" (For the Flag of Justice - The Resistance Anthem (EX track))	正義を旗に-レジスタンスの唱歌 (EX track)	4:30
19.	"Neo Arcadia II"	ネオ・アルカディア2	3:52
20.	"Power Bomb"	パワーボム	2:28
21.	"Uneasy"	アンイージー	2:21
22.	"Spreading Darkness"	広がる闇	3:44

Disc 2
No.	Title	Japanese title	Length
1.	"L'oiseau du bonheur (EX track)" (The Happy Bird (EX track))	幸せの鳥 (EX track)	4:33
2.	"Cool Water"	クール・ウォーター	3:46
3.	"Passionate"	パショネイト	2:43
4.	"Flash Back"	フラッシュバック	3:17
5.	"Combustion"	コンバスチョン	2:02
6.	"Melt Down"	メルトダウン	2:24
7.	"Cool Hearted Fellow"	クール・ハーテッド・フェロー	1:55
8.	"The Cloudy Stone"	クラウディ・ストーン	3:28
9.	"Harpuia" (Crazed Harpuia)	狂えるハイピュイア	1:04
10.	"The End of Legend"	ジ・エンド・オブ・レジェンド	1:31
11.	"Silver Wolf - Yggr-drasill -" (Bright Silver - Yggr-drasill)	銀朗-ユグドラシル	3:38
12.	"Supreme Ruler"	スプリーム・ルーラー	3:28
13.	"Darkelf"	ダークエルフ	1:52
14.	"The Last - The Wish Punished -" (Demise - The Wish Punished)	終焉-罰せられし希望	2:54
15.	"In Mother's Light"	母なる光の中で	4:33
16.	"Awakening Will"	目覚める意志	3:38
17.	"Red Time (EX track)"	レッドタイム (EX track)	2:32
18.	"Clover (EX track)"	クローバー (EX track)	4:19

=== Remastered Tracks Rockman Zero: Telos ===
Remastered Tracks Rockman Zero: Telos

Soundtrack album by Various artists
- Released: December 10, 2004
- Genre: Video game soundtrack
- Length: 2:10:54
- Label: Inti Creates

Remastered Tracks Rockman Zero: Telos is a soundtrack album which contains remixed game tracks from Mega Man Zero 3. The tracks were composed and remixed by Ippo Yamada, Luna Umegaki, Masaki Suzuki, Makoto Tomozawa, and Tsutomu Kurihara. The two-disc album was published by Inti Creates on December 12, 2004 with the catalog numbers INTIR-004/5. It contains 47 tracks and covers a duration of 2:10:54. The last ten tracks of the second disc are drama tracks, which cover multiple events set both before Mega Man Zero 3 and during.

Track list

Literal translation of the original titles appear in (brackets) if different

Disc 1
No.	Title	Japanese title	Length
1.	"Title III"	タイトル3	0:12
2.	"Neo Arcadia March"	ネオ・アルカディア・マーチ	1:33
3.	"Forbidden Ark" (Abominable Ark)	忌わしき箱船	2:45
4.	"Break Out"	ブレークアウト	2:25
5.	"Darkness over World" (Darkness)	暗澹	3:26
6.	"Exiled One -Omega-"	追放されしモノ-オメガ	1:18
7.	"Omega Battle"	オメガバトル	1:04
8.	"Curse of Vile" (Vengeful Scientist)	怨讐の科学者	3:01
9.	"Result of Mission III" (Results 3)	リザルト3	0:58
10.	"Prismatic"	プリズマティック	2:29
11.	"Visor Eyes"	バイザー・アイズ	3:05
12.	"Volcano"	ボルケノ	2:45
13.	"Water City"	ウォーター・シティ	2:54
14.	"Reborn Mechanics"	リボーン・メカニクス	3:05
15.	"Old Life Space"	オールド・ライフ・スペース	2:02
16.	"Crèer and Prier"	クリエとプリエ	1:10
17.	"Crash III"	クラッシュ3	1:20
18.	"Final Count Down"	ファイナルカウントダウン	2:23
19.	"Omega Missile"	オメガミサイル	1:04
20.	"Darkelf -Arrange-"	ダークエルフ -Arrange-	1:47
21.	"For Endless Fight III" (For an Endless Fight)	果てしなき戦いへ3	3:25
22.	"Sand Triangle II"	サンド・トライアングル2	3:35
23.	"Infiltration II"	潜入2	2:41
24.	"Neo Arcadia III" (Neo Arcadia)	ネオ・アルカディア3	3:27
25.	"Cold Smile"	冷めた微笑	3:08
26.	"Trail on Powdery Snow" (Powder Trail)	パウダー・トレイル	4:19
27.	"Submerged Memory"	水没した記憶	2:34
28.	"High-Speed Lift"	ハイ・スピード・リフト	2:33

Disc 2
No.	Title	Japanese title	Length
1.	"Hell's Gate Open" (Hell's Gate)	ヘルズゲイト	3:39
2.	"Scrapped Beat"	スクラップ・ビート	1:23
3.	"Judgment Day"	ジャッジメント・デイ	3:32
4.	"Return to Zero" (Zero/Return)	ゼロ／リターン	1:41
5.	"Apocalypse Now" (Devil Advent)	魔神降臨	0:56
6.	"Cannon Ball"	キャノンボール	2:16
7.	"I, 0 Your Fellow" (You are Zero)	あなたはゼロ	2:50
8.	"Everlasting Red" (Red Legend)	紅き伝説	3:11
9.	"Labo -System-a-Ciel-"	ラボ-システマ・シエル	2:22
10.	"Retrospect1_Elf War" (Thoughts/Elf War)	思／妖精戦争	3:36
11.	"Record1_Clockwork Apple" (Chronicle/Taboo)	史／禁忌	4:44
12.	"Record2_Irregular Passion" (Chronicle/The Wish)	史／希望	4:27
13.	"Decision_Eight Gentle Judges" (Administration/The Superior Choice)	司／より良き選択	2:31
14.	"Diary_Alouette's Good Day" (Records/Alouette Goes About!)	誌／アルエットがゆく!	14:38
15.	"Will1_Vile Numbers" (Will/Trail of Disaster)	志／厄災来たれり	4:21
16.	"Will2_Light and Shadow" (Will/Wandering Soul)	志／彷徨える魂	1:30
17.	"Will3_Stand and Fight" (Will/For Whose Sake)	志／誰が為に	3:20
18.	"Will4_With Our Justice" (Will/Counterattack)	志／反撃	2:46
19.	"Retrospect2_Dream's Never End" (Thoughts/The Soul, for How Many Years)	思／魂、幾星霜	0:43

=== Remastered Tracks Rockman Zero: Physis ===
Remastered Tracks Rockman Zero: Physis

Soundtrack album by Various artists
- Released: September 30, 2005
- Genre: Video game soundtrack
- Length: 2:03:20
- Label: Inti Creates

Remastered Tracks Rockman Zero: Physis is a soundtrack album which contains remixed game tracks from Mega Man Zero 4. The tracks were composed and remixed by Ippo Yamada, Luna Umegaki, Masaki Suzuki, Shinichi Itakura, and Chicken Mob. The two-disc album was published by Inti Creates on September 30, 2005 with the catalog numbers INTIR-006/7. It contains 41 tracks and covers a duration of 2:03:20. Several of the tracks are drama tracks rather than tunes; these focus on the events of the game rather than expanding on them as in previous albums. The last three tracks are karaoke versions of tracks from previous albums. The title of the drama tracks begin with "Ragnarok Record".

Track list

Literal translation of the original titles appear in (brackets) if different

Disc 1
No.	Title	Japanese title	Length
1.	"Title IV"	タイトル4	0:14
2.	"Ragnarok Record -Prologue- Gjallarhorn" (-Prologue- The Yelling Horn Has Been Sounded)	-プロローグ- 角笛は鳴らされた	2:41
3.	"Caravan - Hope for Freedom -" (Caravan)	キャラバン	2:29
4.	"Nothing Beats" (Indomitable, Invincible)	不屈不敗	2:23
5.	"Holy Land"	ホーリー・ランド	3:14
6.	"Elves Dance"	エルフ・ダンス	1:17
7.	"Esperanto"	エスペラント	3:39
8.	"Fragile Border" (Torn at the Seams)	ほころび	3:35
9.	"On the Edge" (Edge of the Blade)	剣尖	1:44
10.	"Kraft"	クラフト	2:26
11.	"Max Heat"	マックス・ヒート	2:21
12.	"Deep Blue"	ディープ・ブルー	2:55
13.	"Celestial Gardens"	セレスティアル・ガーデン	2:20
14.	"Queen of the Hurt" (Subdue Him, Painful Rhyme)	従えよ苦韻(くいん)	2:33
15.	"Showdown" (Riot)	争乱	2:21
16.	"Cage of Tyrant"	暴虐の檻	1:41
17.	"Ragnarok Record -At Prison- Valhol" (-At Prison- The Hall of Chance Meetings)	-監獄にて- 邂逅の館	5:55
18.	"Exodus"	エグゾダス	3:28
19.	"Blaze Down"	ブレイズ・ダウン	2:26
20.	"Sleeping Beast" (Sleeping Moon)	眠れる月	2:40
21.	"Magnetic Rumble" (Storming Polarity)	嵐降(あらぶ)る双極	3:17
22.	"Blackheart Beat" (Evil Heartbeat)	悪意の鼓動	2:28
23.	"Crash IV"	クラッシュ4	1:49

Disc 2
No.	Title	Japanese title	Length
1.	"Straight Ahead" (Without Retreating)	退(しりぞ)くことなく	3:02
2.	"Ragnarok Record -At Control room- Laevatein" (-Ragnarok Cannon- Blaze of Conviction)	-ラグナロク発射- 断罪の炎	3:39
3.	"Power Field"	パワー・フィールド	2:25
4.	"Rust and Dust" (Ash and Ember)	灰燼	1:55
5.	"Crossover Station"	クロスオーバー・ステーション	2:19
6.	"Cyber Space"	サイバー・スペース	2:30
7.	"Ragnarok" (Twilit Heavens)	黄昏の宇宙(そら)	4:25
8.	"Fate - Theme of Vile -" (Fate)	宿命	1:41
9.	"Ragnarok Record -Final battle- Ragnarok" (-The Final Battle- Ideals and Convictions)	-最終決戦- 理想と信念	5:53
10.	"Falling Down" (Falling Nightmare)	堕(お)ちゆく悪夢	3:07
11.	"Ciel d'aube" (Dawn Sky)	黎明の空	5:22
12.	"Promise - Next New World - ( Overseas Version )" (Promise - To the Next Stage)	プロミス−次の舞台へ	3:19
13.	"Alouette March"	アルエット・マーチ	3:16
14.	"Inside of a Flame"	インサイド・オブ・ア・フレイム	2:38
15.	"Freesia"	フリジア	4:25
16.	"L' Oiseau Du Bonheur ( Karaoke Version )" (The Bird of Happiness (Karaoke Version))	幸せの鳥 ( Karaoke Version )	4:44
17.	"Freesia ( Karaoke Version )"	フリジア ( Karaoke Version )	4:25
18.	"Clover ( Karaoke Version )"	クローバー ( Karaoke Version )	4:19

=== Remastered Tracks Rockman Zero: Mythos ===
Remastered Tracks Rockman Zero: Mythos

Soundtrack album by Various artists
- Released: June 10, 2010
- Genre: Video game soundtrack
- Length: 48:18
- Label: Inti Creates

Remastered Tracks Rockman Zero: Mythos is a soundtrack album which contains remixed game tracks from Mega Man Zero Collection, a compilation release of the Mega Man Zero games for the Nintendo DS. The tracks were composed and remixed by Ippo Yamada, Luna Umegaki, and Tsutomu Kurihara. The album was published by Inti Creates on June 10, 2010 with the catalog number INTIR-0018. It contains 14 tracks, including one hidden track, and covers a duration of 48:18. Unlike the previous albums, Mythos does not include any drama tracks. At the same time that Mythos was released, a box set entitled Remastered Tracks Rockman Zero Limited Box was published, containing all five Remastered Tracks albums.

Track list
No.	Title	Length
1.	"Final Match"	1:50
2.	"Departure" (Mythos version)	3:36
3.	"Esperanto" (Mythos version)	3:03
4.	"Sand Triangle" (Mythos version)	3:34
5.	"Resistance" (Mythos version)	2:48
6.	"Neo Arcadia" (Mythos version)	3:21
7.	"Enemy Hall" (Mythos version)	4:36
8.	"Hell's Gate Open" (Mythos version)	4:29
9.	"Silver Wolf" (Mythos version)	3:14
10.	"Straight Ahead" (Mythos version)	3:47
11.	"I,0 Your Fellow" (Interlude)	2:20
12.	"Everlasting"	4:34
13.	"Area of Zero" (Mythos version)	3:44
14.	"[Hidden Track] Cannon Ball" (Mythos version)	3:22
