= Mega Man Zero Collection =

- North American cover art
- Developer: Inti Creates
- Publisher: Capcom
- Directors: Ryota Ito; Yoshinori Kawano
- Producers: Takuya Aizu; Keiji Inafune; Ken Horinouchi
- Designers: Masahiro Mizukoshi; Yoshihisa Tsuda; Yoshiaki Iwanaga
- Artist: Toru Nakayama (character)
- Composers: Ippo Yamada; Masaki Suzuki; Luna Umegaki; Tsutomu Kurihara; Shinichi Itakura
- Series: Mega Man Zero
- Platform: Nintendo DS
- Release: NA: June 8, 2010; JP/AU: June 10, 2010; EU: June 11, 2010
- Genres: Action, platform, hack and slash, run 'n gun
- Mode: Single-player

Mega Man Zero Collection (Note: Japanese: ロックマンゼロコレクション, Hepburn: Rokkuman Zero Korekushon) is a compilation of all four Mega Man Zero video games, which were originally released for the Game Boy Advance between 2002 and 2005. It was developed by Inti Creates and published by Capcom, and was made available worldwide in June 2010 for the Nintendo DS. The collection contains new features such as a beginner-friendly "Easy Scenario" that grants power-up items and abilities from the beginning of each game, as well as unlockable character art and the ability to display artwork on the Nintendo DS's bottom screen as the game is played.

== Gameplay ==
Mega Man Zero Collection is a compilation of Mega Man Zero, Mega Man Zero 2, Mega Man Zero 3, and Mega Man Zero 4, a series of 2D action platformer games originally for the Game Boy Advance that emphasize dashing, jumping, and dispatching enemies with various weapons. The individual systems of each title are retained in the collection, with the addition of new features such as the ability to play through all games in order as one cohesive story. A new "Easy Scenario" mode decreases the overall difficulty of every title by granting many power-up items and abilities from the beginning, which saves the player from having to obtain them through normal means. Players may also map the game's controls to accommodate for the Nintendo DS's two extra buttons compared to the Game Boy Advance. The Modification Cards for the Nintendo e-Reader from the original Japanese version of Zero 3 are included as well and are unlocked in groups by completing each game in this collection.

Primary gameplay takes place of the top screen of the Nintendo DS, while the extra bottom screen displays static artwork relevant to the portion of the game the player has reached. During a boss fight, for instance, concept artwork of the enemy will appear on the bottom screen throughout the battle. All art collected in this way becomes available for viewing in the game's Gallery menu. The original Game Boy Advance aspect ratio is preserved on the marginally larger Nintendo DS screens by placing a black border around the gameplay area in each title.

== Development ==
Mega Man Zero Collection was announced by a representative of Capcom in January 2010 for the Nintendo DS, and that the collection would be sold at a suggested retail price below that of one individual Zero series game at launch. Two weeks later, the company announced a release in North America for the following Summer. In April 2010, Capcom announced the compilation's final North American release date of June 8, and elaborated that the game would feature new gameplay modes. A playable demo was made available to review websites just prior to the 2010 Electronic Entertainment Expo in Los Angeles and the final version was released in all territories in June 2010. The game was re-released in Japan on April 21, 2011 as part of the Nintendo DS budget "New Best Price! 2000" series.

The year after the collection's launch, Inti Creates released the Rockman Zero Collection Soundtrack -résonnant vie- (French for "resonant life") on April 21, 2011, a soundtrack album featuring 13 track from the series arranged for violin and piano. Arrangers and performers for the album include the series' original composer, such as Ippo Yamada, Ryo Kawakami, and Luna Umegaki.

== Reception ==
Reception

Aggregate score
Aggregator	Score
Metacritic	78/100

Review scores
Publication	Score
Famitsu	30/40
Game Informer	8/10
GamePro	3/5
IGN	8/10
Nintendo Power	9/10

Mega Man Zero Collection sold approximately 22,000 copies in Japan in its debut week, entering the Japanese sales charts as the fourth best-selling software title of that period, and received a 30 out of 40 total score from Weekly Famitsu magazine based on individual scores of 8, 8, 7, and 7.

English reviews were mostly positive, with the title earning a 78 out of 100 score from aggregate review website Metacritic. Reviewers commended the convenience of have all four Mega Man Zero games in one cartridge, and the value of owning them for the retail price of just one of the originals, but lamented that the compilation itself didn't have enough special features or enhancements. As Lucas M. Thomas of IGN stated, "The appeal of this collection is in the games it collects, not the collection itself." The editor felt that the Easy Scenario mode cheapened the experience by feeling like a "cheat code" and that the button-mapping screen was cumbersome, but still found the games themselves enjoyable, adding "But even with mixed feelings towards the quality of the compilation, there's no denying the strength of the individual games." Tim Turi of Game Informer also felt that "[Easy Scenario] robs much of the game’s reward factor, but it makes playing all four games back to back a much smoother process." John Constantine of GamePro, however, thought that the new mode could streamline the game's playthough, remarking that "While it makes the games a cakewalk for Mega Man veterans, it allows you to appreciate Zero 1-4 as pure action games," and that the collection as a whole "allows us to revisit the series free of its excesses."

The game was recommended more for new players than returning, owing to the collection's overall lack of new additions to the original games. Nintendo Power commented that "If you missed any of these games the first time around, this is the perfect chance to grab the lot of 'em." Game Informer likewise recommended the game to fans of the overall series, stating "Mega Man fans that missed out on the Zero series should pick up the Mega Man Zero collection, as it makes the drought of new Mega Man titles a bit more bearable."

== See also ==
- Mega Man Zero/ZX Legacy Collection, a subsequent compilation of the Mega Man Zero series
