= MMZ =

MMZ may refer to:

- Mega Man Zero
  - Mega Man Zero (series), a series of video games released by Capcom for the Game Boy Advance
  - Mega Man Zero (video game), the first video game in the series
- MMZ (motorcycle), a motorcycle manufacturer based in Moscow
- BELOMO, an old name for the Belarusian company
