= Kabu Trader Shun =

2007 video game

- Developer: Inti Creates
- Publisher: Capcom
- Director: Yukio Ando
- Producers: Takuya Aizu; Yoshihisa Tsuda; Tatsuya Kitabayashi
- Designers: Satoshi Yajima; Yasuhiro Tanino
- Artist: Shujiro Hamakawa
- Composers: Ippo Yamada; Takuma Sato
- Platform: Nintendo DS
- Release: JP: June 7, 2007
- Genre: Adventure
- Mode: Single-player

Kabu Trader Shun (Japanese: 株トレーダー瞬, Hepburn: Kabu Torēdā Shun; literally "Stock Trader Shun") is an adventure video game for the Nintendo DS. The game was developed by Inti Creates, published by Capcom, and released exclusively in Japan on June 7, 2007. The plot follows the young protagonist Shun Aiba entering the lucrative world of stock trading in order to follow in the footsteps of his father, a famous trader himself who disappeared five years earlier. The goal of the game is increase Shun's wealth with gameplay consisting of daily management of personal stocks, traveling around various points of interest within a city to advance the story, and engaging in one-on-one battles with rival stock traders.

Director Yukio Ando used his personal experience in the stock market for its development. The trading simulation gameplay was simplified and combined with adventure game components, while manga and anime elements were incorporated into its graphics and plot, all in an attempt to broaden the game's appeal. Kabu Trader Shun was one of several DS games based around stock trading that was available on the DS in Japan at that time. Prior to its release, news outlets universally compared the game's overall presentation to Capcom's visual novel legal drama series Ace Attorney. Kabu Trader Shun sold poorly and was never released outside of Japan.

== Gameplay ==
The player assumes the role of 18 year-old stock trader named Shun Aiba. Shun's father Ippei was a legendary trader who lost a trading battle, went bankrupt, and disappeared five years earlier. At the game's opening, Shun enlists the help of his father's former trading partner and disciple, Toru Narasaki, to teach him all he knows. Shun is also joined by Hanako Kirikagura, Toru's pupil and the daughter of a family which owns a major securities company. Gameplay is set up as an adventure with the main objective being to increase Shun's wealth through a set of invested stocks. The player must complete a series of stock trading objectives by traveling around a city to various points of interest and interacting with non-player characters (NPCs) to advance the story. Trading sessions take place on a menu screen where the player can track and manage Shun's stocks throughout each day. A graph depicting each stock shows its daily average and its dynamic profit or loss. The graph can be zoomed out to show a stock's progress over the course of 20 days. Up to three stocks can be viewed per trading session with the option to simply buy or sell shares of each one. Hints are given to the player on whether to perform one of these actions when active stocks begin to flash red, indicating a big event is about to occur via a news report. For example, a release announcement for a hit product could cause the stock price to sharply rise whereas a catastrophic accident may make it fall drastically.

The game contains one-on-one versus trading battles between the player and certain NPCs, where the winner takes some of the loser's funds. Battles consist of either racing to see who can make the most money over a duration of time or to see who can first reach a set profit mark. Each competitor has a spirit meter which increases when they perform well or decreases when their CPU-controlled opponent does so. If Shun's spirit depletes, the screen is covered in physical objects that obstruct trading and must be wiped away using the DS stylus before continuing. The player can also utilize special abilities called "Trading Arts" to boost Shun's spirit, make his rival's spirit fall, or cause other beneficial effects in battle. These skills can be purchased using points earned during either solo or versus trading.

== Development ==
Plans to develop Kabu Trader Shun began in the spring of 2005 when Yukio Ando submitted a proposal for the game to publisher Capcom. Kabu Trader Shun was chosen out of six proposals Ando put forth and was the only idea among these that was not based on an already-existing Capcom property. Its development team was assembled by the spring of 2006 with Ando serving as director and his colleague Tatsuya Kitabayashi signing on as producer. Ando previously served various roles like designing, planning, and scenario writing for numerous Capcom titles including Haunting Ground, Onimusha: Dawn of Dreams, and the Breath of Fire series. Kitabayashi joined the company as a programmer for Breath of Fire III before working his way up to producer on both Mega Man Powered Up and Mega Man: Maverick Hunter X. According to an official development blog, the game's production elements including its design, programming, artwork, and music were handled by Inti Creates, an independent group of ex-Capcom employees mostly known up to that point for developing the Mega Man Zero series. Inti Creates co-founder and lead music composer Ippo Yamada was responsible for the game's sound design, sound effect production, voice casting, and recording while also contributing to its story fundamentals and gameplay system. The game's musical score was co-composed by Yamada and Takuma Sato. While Sato created a majority of the game's soundtrack, Yamada composed its main theme and a vocal version of the game's ending theme for the official soundtrack. Vocalist Takayoshi Tanimoto also helped arrange this latter, bonus song.

Prior to the start of the project, Kitabayashi had limited knowledge of stock trading, while Ando claimed to have had quite a bit of personal experience in the field. The director initially had difficulty planning an interesting game centered around investing and making money, the primary goal of stock trading, without the player actually making any real money. To accomplish this, Ando decided to include adventure game elements and gameplay that would simulate stock trading in a simplified, fun way. According to Kitabayashi, the characters and world setting were given anime aesthetics to broaden the game's appeal for a wider audience. Artist and illustrator Shujirou Hamakawa (also known as "Shuzilow.HA") was sought out and hired at the behest of Kitabayashi to design the game's characters. The game's plot incorporated drama inspired by popular shōnen manga as well as some true events, such as a 2006 securities scandal and law enforcement raid of internet service provider Livedoor.

== Release and reception ==
Capcom officially announced Kabu Trader Shun at the Tokyo Game Show in the fall of 2006. Kabu Trader Shun was released exclusively in Japan on June 7, 2007. It was the third Nintendo DS game about stock trading to be released in the region following Konami's Kabushiki Baibai Trainer Kabutore! and Namco Bandai's Wakabayashi Fumie no DS Kabu Lesson. A free demo version of the game was made available for download at Touch! Try! DS kiosks on the day of the game's full release. A limited amount of Kabu Trader Shun tie-in merchandise was offered amidst the game's launch. Some individuals who purchased the game directly from Capcom were issued a mobile device strap with a character-themed LCD cleaner. An official strategy guide and soundtrack were released in July 2007. As with many Capcom games of the era, anthology manga based on Kabu Trader Shun was published by Enterbrain under its Bros. Comics EX imprint in the months that followed.

Prior to its release, news outlets universally compared Kabu Trader Shun to Capcom's visual novel legal drama series Ace Attorney (Gyakuten Saiban in Japan), which features a similar anime-style presentation and adventure game elements. When playtesting Kabu Trader Shun, Anoop Gantayat of IGN declared that the game had "the potential to be the Gyakuten Saiban of Wall Street." Kabu Trader Shun was scored a 30 out of 40 by Famitsu, placing it in the magazine's "Silver Hall of Fame". Game director Yukio Ando expressed disappointment that it was two points shy of reaching the publication's coveted "Gold Hall of Fame." The game only sold 25,116 copies in Japan by the end of 2007 according to Famitsu sales data.
