= Mega Man ZX =

2006 video game

- North American box art by Toru Nakayama
- Developer: Inti Creates
- Publisher: Capcom
- Directors: Ryota Ito; Yoshinori Kawano
- Producers: Takuya Aizu; Ken Horinouchi; Keiji Inafune
- Designer: Kinshi Ikegami
- Programmers: Akihiro Shishido; Takayuki Inoue; Shinichi Sema; Hirokazu Kawagishi; Hironori Ikeda
- Artist: Makoto Yabe
- Writer: Makoto Yabe
- Composers: Ippo Yamada; Masaki Suzuki; Ryo Kawakami
- Series: Mega Man
- Platform: Nintendo DS
- Release: JP: July 6, 2006; NA: September 12, 2006; AU: June 20, 2007; EU: June 22, 2007
- Genres: Action, platform, Metroidvania
- Mode: Single-player

Mega Man ZX (Note: known in Japan as Rockman ZX (ロックマンゼクス, Rokkuman Zekusu)) is a 2006 action-platform game developed by Inti Creates and published by Capcom for the Nintendo DS. It was released on July 6, 2006 in Japan, September 12, 2006 in North America, June 20, 2007 in Australia, and June 22, 2007 in Europe.

Part of the Mega Man franchise, ZX is set two hundred years after the events of the Mega Man Zero series, and revolves around the efforts of the protagonist to recover powerful ancient artifacts called "Biometals" from the Pseudoroids, evil robots made to harness their power. The game introduces a new open-ended gameplay environment and the ability to select the protagonist's gender, a first in the series.

The game received positive reviews from critics, who praised its gameplay and level design, but were divided about its high difficulty level. A sequel, Mega Man ZX Advent, was released the following year, in 2007. The game was later re-released in February 2020 as part of the Mega Man Zero/ZX Legacy Collection for PlayStation 4, Xbox One, Nintendo Switch, and Microsoft Windows.

== Gameplay ==
Mega Man ZX contains elements from both the Mega Man X series and the Mega Man Zero series. The player controls a character along a side-scrolling 2D plane, using jumps, dashes, and both melee and ranged weapons to traverse platforms and engage enemies, in order to cross the game world and complete missions. Missions are selected from a list, displayed on a computer. The player can freely explore the game world during and between missions, and they must find a mission's specified area themselves. The game also adds metroidvania concepts into the level design, with more exploration elements than the main Mega Man series.

During the game, the player uses "Biometals", sentient mechanical artifacts, to transform into different forms whose appearances and abilities are based on X, Zero, and the Four Guardians from the Mega Man Zero series. Each form has unique abilities that can be used to fight enemies, solve puzzles, and obtain special items found throughout the game world. The function of the Nintendo DS's touch screen changes with each form as well; for example, one form displays a radar on the touch screen, while another allows the player to customize the trajectory of their shots. The Model X form is initially only available temporarily at the beginning of the game, but it becomes a permanent transformation option during a second playthrough. The player can also choose to transform back into a powerless human, allowing them to crawl through tight spaces and move through civilian areas without frightening civilians or being attacked by security devices.

Additionally, nine extra bosses from the Zero series appear as hidden encounters: four stage bosses from Mega Man Zero 3, four stage bosses from Mega Man Zero 4, and Omega from Zero 3. While Omega can be encountered by default, each game's set of stage bosses are accessed from a hidden room which can only be accessed by inserting the GBA cartridge of the appropriate game into the GBA slot for the Nintendo DS or DS Lite. After defeating all eight stage bosses or Omega and then completing the game, the player will gain the ability to play as Omega until they start a new game.

For the Mega Man Zero/ZX Legacy Collection release, the gameplay received minor changes to make features exclusive to the DS's hardware accessible on all platforms. The touch screen features are now placed in a small support window outside of the main game display, which can be positioned as the player chooses and operated using a control stick. The hidden encounters with the Zero series stage bosses are now accessed by activating "Link Mode" in the collection's main menu; when accessing Mega Man ZX, the player is allowed to select either the Zero 3 or Zero 4 link to encounter the bosses from that respective game.

== Plot ==
=== Setting and Characters ===
In the year 25XX, humans and Reploids (sentient androids) now coexist peacefully, successfully restoring Earth's former nations thanks to the efforts of Slither Inc., an energy development and private security organization run by a Reploid named Serpent. However, the peace is disrupted by several incidents of Reploids mysteriously going Maverick. Trading between nations became obstructed, forcing the nations to separate into utopian cities.

To repel the attacks, people banded together to create the Guardians, a Maverick-fighting defense and investigation force. The group's original leader, Ciel, mysteriously disappeared after an investigation where she discovered a Biometal (a living artifact containing characteristics of someone who lived long ago) called "Model W", which turned her team into Mavericks. In response, Ciel created six new Biometals (based on X, Zero, and the Four Guardians of Neo Arcadia) to counter the growing threat. The current leader of the Guardians is a female Reploid named Prairie, who is implied to be Alouette from the Mega Man Zero series.

The player assumes the role of an adolescent human, choosing between either Vent, a boy, or Aile, a girl. This protagonist lost their mother to a Maverick raid on an amusement park ten years prior, becoming orphaned. They were later taken in by Girouette (Giro for short in North America and Europe), the owner of Giro Express (Girouette Express in Japan), a delivery service.

=== Story ===
Giro and the protagonist are contracted by an unknown individual to deliver a package containing Biometal Model X to a rendezvous point in a forest, but are ambushed by Mavericks after meeting up. The protagonist escapes the area with the package while Giro covers their retreat. They encounter Prairie, but their meeting is cut short when a Maverick attacks the group. Model X lends its strength to the protagonist, allowing them to "Megamerge" and transform into Mega Man Model X. With the help of Model X, the Maverick is destroyed. After finding Giro, in the form of Mega Man Model Z, they board the Guardians' airship headquarters. Later, a Maverick attack is spotted at the Slither Inc. main office. The duo meet the president of Slither Inc., Serpent, and his Reploid guardians, Prometheus and Pandora. Serpent reveals his knowledge of the Biometals and that he is also a Mega Man, possessing Model W. He declares his intent to find the Model W Core, and leaves after using the power of Model W to corrupt a weakened Giro, who attacks the protagonist. Giro is mortally wounded in the fight and hands Model Z over to the protagonist before dying. By "double mega-merging" with both Model X and Model Z, they use the form Model ZX to escape. To stop Serpent, the Guardians, aided by the protagonist, begin searching for the fragments of the other four Biometals, which are each divided in two pieces.

After finding four of eight Biometal pieces, the Guardian HQ comes under attack from Mavericks, led by Prometheus, with the protagonist aiding in the defenses. They succeed in defeating Promethus before recovering the rest of the pieces. Upon retrieving all eight Biometal pieces, the protagonist is able to enter a sealed cavern, finding the Model W Core inside. However, they are stalled by Pandora and the Biometal is moved to the Slither Inc. Head Office. The protagonist sets off after Model W to destroy it.

After battling through Slither Inc., the protagonist faces off against Serpent, who feeds the Model W core with several innocent Cyber Elves and then fuses with it. Realizing that the hatred of the Mavericks that they have kept inside their heart is the last thing needed to unleash Model W's full power, the protagonist suddenly reverts into a human, unable to continue. However, after gaining courage from the Biometals, the protagonist Megamerges into Mega Man ZX and battles Serpent. The tower collapses, destroying Model W and killing Serpent. The protagonist reunites with Prairie and the Guardians, and vows to continue to work for peace and justice.

== Development ==
News of a Mega Man game for the Nintendo DS first appeared on GameSpot, January 2006 on the same day that Capcom created an official teaser site. Capcom promised that this game would be a 2D side-scrolling action game with the ability to choose between a male character, Vent, or a female character, Aile.

A demo first appeared in Electronic Entertainment Expo (E3) 2006 at an unlabelled kiosk at the Capcom booth. Much of the main introductory plot was revealed and two in-game levels, Area H and Area E were playable. The controls were said to be "simple enough… yet challenging", but reviewers did see some slowdown.

=== Audio ===
Rockman ZX Soundtrack -ZX Tunes- is the first remastered soundtrack album to be released for the Mega Man ZX series on October 27, 2006 by Inti Creates. The album consists of 2 Discs called Aile and Vent, named after the hero and the heroine of the game, and it is 131:37 minutes long. It also features one vocal track, Innocence, and five remix tracks.

Aile Disc
No.	Title	Length
1.	"Innocence" (by CAO)
2.	"Awake"
3.	"Fragments"
4.	"Green Grass Gradation"
5.	"En-trance Code"
6.	"Brilliant Show Window"
7.	"Cinq Ville - c'est notre espoir -"
8.	"Wonder Panorama"
9.	"Industrialism"
10.	"Ultramarine Meditation - Blessed Pop -" (Guest remix by Akari Groves)
11.	"Sky High - Grand Nuage -"
12.	"Metallic Soul"
13.	"Danger Attraction"
14.	"Misty Rain"
15.	"Ultramarine Meditation"
16.	"Babel Tower"
17.	"Fate - deep-seated grudge"
18.	"Black Burn - Electpital Dance -" (Guest remix by Satoru Kōsaki)
19.	"Innocence - karaoke version -"
20.	"Innocence - PV Version -"

Vent Disc
No.	Title	Length
1.	"High-press Energy - Super Aniki Edition -" (Guest remix by Kōji Hayama)
2.	"Crisis Zone"
3.	"Mountain Rider"
4.	"Trinity"
5.	"Ogre Claw"
6.	"Dance-macabre"
7.	"Rockin' On"
8.	"High-press Energy"
9.	"Gauntlet"
10.	"Brilliant Show Window - Shooter Trance -" (Guest remix by Manabu Namiki)
11.	"Onslaught"
12.	"Trap Factory"
13.	"Doomsday Device"
14.	"Black Burn"
15.	"Phalanx"
16.	"Snake Eyes"
17.	"Pallida Mors"
18.	"Dream Weaver"
19.	"Cannon Ball - Hard Revenge -"
20.	"Hidden track"

== Reception ==
Reception

Aggregate score
Aggregator	Score
Metacritic	76/100

Review scores
Publication	Score
Famitsu	31/40
GameSpot	7.7/10
GameSpy	7.3/10
IGN	8.2/10
Nintendo Power	8.5/10
Play	9/10
X-Play	3/5

Mega Man ZX garnered positive reviews from most sources, garnering a Metacritic score of 76 out of 100. Similar to Mega Man Zero, Mega Man ZX was compared to the original Mega Man series. Its high level of difficulty was enjoyed by some, but criticized by others. Its gameplay presentation and level designs were praised. Low points in reviews were the confusing world map and frustrating difficulty level.

Mega Man ZX was the sixth-best-selling game in Japan during its release week at 33,652 units sold. 94,341 units of the game were sold in the region by the end of 2006. A direct sequel, Mega Man ZX Advent, was announced for release the following year.
