= Area Zero =

Area Zero may refer to:

- Kilometre zero
- Zero mile
- Location in Pokémon Scarlet and Violet
- Location in Mega Man Zero 4
