= Ippo Yamada =

Japanese video game music composer

- 山田 一法
- Born: Kawasaki, Kanagawa, Japan
- Other name: IPPO
- Education: Chiba University
- Occupations: Composer, sound designer
- Years active: 1993–present
- Employers: Capcom (1993–1996); Inti Creates (1996–present)

Ippo Yamada (山田一法 Yamada Ippō) is a video game music composer. He has contributed music to such titles as Mega Man Zero (2002), Mega Man ZX (2006), Mega Man 9 (2008), and Azure Striker Gunvolt (2014). He is a founding member of Inti Creates, a Japanese video game development company formed by ex-Capcom staff in May 1996.

== Works ==
Year	Title	Role(s)	Ref.
1994	Super Street Fighter II (SNES version)	Sound designer	
1994	Mega Man X2	Sound designer	
1994	Demon's Crest	Sound designer	
1995	Mega Man 7	Sound designer	
1996	Resident Evil	Sound designer	
1998	Speed Power Gunbike	Music	
1999	Love & Destroy	Music	
2002	Mega Man Zero	Music	
2003	Mega Man Zero 2	Sound designer	
2004	Mega Man Zero 3	Music with Masaki Suzuki, Tsutomu Kurihara, and Luna Umegaki	
2005	Mega Man Zero 4	Music with Masaki Suzuki, Luna Umegaki, and Shinichi Itakura	
2006	Mega Man ZX	Music with Masaki Suzuki and Ryo Kawakami	
2007	Kabu Trader Shun	Music with Takuma Sato	
2007	Mega Man ZX Advent	Music with several others	
2008	Mega Man 9	Music with Ryo Kawakami, Yu Shimoda, and Hiroki Isogai	
2010	Mega Man 10	Music with several others	
2011	Gal Gun	Music with Hiroki Isogai, Luna Umegaki and Ryo Kawakami	
2011	Power Rangers Samurai (DS)	Music with Ryo Kawakami and Mina Hatazoe	
2013	Pac-Man and the Ghostly Adventures (3DS)	Music with Mina Hatazoe	
2014	Azure Striker Gunvolt	Music with several others	
2014	Mighty Gunvolt	Music with Ryo Kawakami	
2015	Gal Gun: Double Peace	Music with several others	
2016	Mighty No. 9	Music with several others	
2016	Azure Striker Gunvolt 2	Music with several others	
2017	Blaster Master Zero	Music with Hiroaki Sano, Aoi Tanaka, and Kotaro Yamada	
2018	Bloodstained: Curse of the Moon	Music with several others	
2019	Bloodstained: Ritual of the Night	"Cursed Orphan"	
2019	Dragon Marked For Death	Music with several others	
2019	Blaster Master Zero 2	Music with Hiroaki Sano, Aoi Tanaka and Kotaro Yamada	
2019	Gunvolt Chronicles: Luminous Avenger iX	Music with several others	
2020	Bloodstained: Curse of the Moon 2	Music with several others	
2021	Blaster Master Zero 3	Music with several others	
2022	Gunvolt Chronicles: Luminous Avenger iX 2	Music with several others	
2022	Azure Striker Gunvolt 3	Music with several others	
2023	Gal Guardians: Demon Purge		
2023	Yohane the Parhelion: Blaze in the Deepblue	"Get Fired Up, The Final Battle!" with Hiroaki Sano	
