= Mega Man Zero (video game) =

2002 video game

- North American cover art
- Developer: Inti Creates
- Publisher: Capcom
- Directors: Ryota Ito; Yoshinori Kawano
- Producers: Takuya Aizu; Keiji Inafune
- Designer: Masahiro Mizukoshi
- Programmers: Takayuki Inoue; Kazutaka Yanagisawa; Akihiro Shishido; Hirokatsu Kawanishi
- Artist: Toru Nakayama
- Composer: Ippo Yamada
- Series: Mega Man Zero
- Platform: Game Boy Advance
- Release: JP: April 26, 2002; NA: September 10, 2002; EU: October 31, 2002
- Genres: Platform, hack and slash
- Mode: Single-player

Mega Man Zero (Note: Japanese: ロックマン ゼロ, Hepburn: Rokkuman Zero; lit. 'Rockman Zero') is a 2002 hack and slash platform game developed by Inti Creates and published by Capcom for the Game Boy Advance. It is the first installment in the Mega Man Zero series, the fifth series in Capcom's Mega Man video game franchise. The game is set 100 years after the events of the Mega Man X series and follows Zero, a Reploid awakened from his sleep to aid a human scientist named Ciel and her resistance force in a fight against the utopia of Neo Arcadia.

Mega Man Zero was produced as a commission product by Inti Creates for Capcom, who were given free rein on the project's direction and premise. During development, the developers aimed to make Zero among the most challenging games in the franchise, and to bridge the gap between the mechanical feel of the X series, and the human feel of the Legends series. The initial idea for the antagonist was to have the original X be the villain, however this was changed late into production to a copy robot due to fears of it not sitting well with players.

Mega Man Zero received mostly positive reviews. Critics praised the game's storyline, graphics, and tweaks to the franchise's classic action formula, though many were put off by its high difficulty level. Mega Man Zero garnered strong sales upon its debut and went on to produce three direct sequels on the GBA, as well as two titles in a sequel series on the Nintendo DS. It was re-released on the Wii U's Virtual Console in Japan on October 22, 2014.

== Plot ==
The narrative of Mega Man Zero is presented through text dialogue cutscenes with 2D sprites and hand-drawn, anime images.

Roughly 100 years following the events of the Mega Man X series and the end of the Maverick Wars, the heroic Maverick Hunters X and Zero have long since vanished. A human scientist named Ciel, her Cyber-elf Passy, and other Reploid companions are being chased through an abandoned underground laboratory. Their relentless pursuers are mass-produced androids called Pantheons, among other terrible machines. After taking heavy losses, Ciel, Passy and the remaining troops arrive at a sealed chamber containing Zero, who has been in stasis for a century. Passy sacrifices itself to awaken Zero, who is amnesic. Ciel, desperately seeking his help, explains they live in a world where Reploids are incorrectly accused of being Mavericks and systematically "retired", apparently under the direction of the once-famed X. Shocked at this revelation and filled with doubt about his own identity as the Maverick Hunter of legend, Zero helps Ciel escape and joins her Resistance to fight against X and the utopia known as Neo Arcadia.

Zero conducts missions on behalf of the Resistance in order to buy Ciel time to create a new energy source that will provide everyone with a safe place to live. One day, the base is attacked by Neo Arcadia, forcing everyone to flee. In the midst of the chaos, Ciel confesses to Zero that she helped create Neo Arcadia as a utopia where humans and Reploids were finally able to live in peace with X as their leader, but her plans fell apart when an energy shortage crisis began and X mysteriously disappeared. To counter this, while at age six, she created a "copy" of X to be its new leader. Copy X strived for X's ultimate desire for a peaceful world, but lacked the original's moral judgement. Believing that the Reploid race posed a danger to humans, Copy X began an operation to brand any Reploid whom he believed to be a menace to humanity as a Maverick and annihilate them without a fair trial, in order to reduce energy consumption.

Zero invades Neo Arcadia and battles his way through the Four Guardians: Sage Harpuia, Hidden Phantom, Fighting Fefnir and Fairy Leviathan. Phantom self-destructs in a last ditch effort to destroy Zero, but fails, while the other three manage to escape. Copy X is eventually defeated, who also self-destructs in an attempt to take Zero with him. Zero escapes just in time from Neo Arcadia as Copy X, and everything around him, is destroyed. Running low on energy, Zero collapses in a nearby desert. A faint figure appears and reveals itself as the real X, now a Cyber-elf, who has been Zero's guide the entire time. X explains that he grew tired of fighting and, without a physical body, has left Zero the responsibility of bringing peace to the world. As X vanishes, Zero finds himself surrounded by an army of Pantheons. Zero accepts X's words and promises to continue the fight against Neo Arcadia. The final scene shows Zero as he dashes into battle against the Pantheons and slices one in half.

== Gameplay ==
The player character Zero dashes left and slashes at an enemy. The left-sided HUD displays the player's remaining health.

Mega Man Zero adopts the action-platforming gameplay prescribed by its predecessors in the original Mega Man and Mega Man X series. The player, as the protagonist Zero, is tasked with completing several side-scrolling stages, destroying enemies, completing objectives and battling bosses. The player can run, jump, fire the player character's primary weapon, or use a secondary weapon if it is available. As in the Mega Man X games, the player can dash along the ground, cling to and scale walls, or perform a combination of these abilities. Unlike previous titles in the franchise where separate stages are selectable from a menu, Mega Man Zero is presented as a single, interconnected overworld. The Resistance base acts as a hub with almost every area in the game freely explorable from it. The player is given a choice of missions to undertake for each section of the map. Completing one mission may unlock others. The player has only three lives to successfully complete a mission before receiving a game over. However, it is possible to fail non-critical missions by escaping the stage, using up both continues, or giving up the mission after dying. Doing so marks the mission as a failure, making it unavailable for the game's remainder.

When available, each of the player's four weapons can be charged up for a more powerful attack. Moreover, the player can level-up weapons with prolonged use of them. Depending on the weapon, leveling one up will allow for more attacks, increased attack range, or shortened charge time. In previous Mega Man games, the player would obtain new weapons from defeated bosses and could in turn use those weapons against other bosses and minor enemies. In Mega Man Zero, defeating some bosses earns the player elemental chips (thunder, fire, or ice) that can be used during a charged attack to further damage foes weak to a specific element. Mega Man Zero also introduces "Cyber Elves", which can be found hidden in certain missions or dropped by enemies. Cyber Elves are collectible, single-use aids with either temporary or permanent effects on Zero or the game's levels. Cyber Elf effects range widely, from reducing the life gauge of a boss to slowing down all enemies in a stage. Up to three Cyber Elves can be equipped for a given level and some can only be activated once they are fed sufficient energy crystals picked up or collected from defeated enemies. The player's performance is scored on a percentage scale and graded at the end of each mission. The results are based on parameters including the completion time, the number of enemies destroyed, and the player's total damage.

== Development ==
=== Conception ===
Mega Man Zero was developed by Inti Creates, a company established in 1996 by several former members of the game's publisher Capcom. Prior to the game's conception, Capcom had developed numerous games in its Mega Man franchise beginning with its classic series in 1987, then expanding to its Mega Man X spin-off series and two non-platformer series, Mega Man Legends and Mega Man Battle Network. Up until the development of Mega Man Zero, Inti Creates was not a successful venture. The company's vice president Yoshihisa Tsuda had wanted to create a Mega Man game and would often attend game conventions to express this interest to Keiji Inafune, an artist and producer for the franchise. Inafune eventually called Inti Creates requesting a game proposal, on which the company promptly began working. Mega Man Zero was developed as a commission product by Inti Creates, who were given a free rein on its design and premise. The game was produced by Inti Creates president Takuya Aiza and was co-directed by Ryota Ito and Capcom's Yoshinori Kawano. Inafune signed on as the game's co-producer.

One goal for the developer was to make Mega Man Zero the most challenging out of all the games in the franchise up to that point. The gameplay model and characters act as extensions of the Mega Man X series, which itself expands upon the original Mega Man series. Zero was a secondary protagonist in the Mega Man X storyline. However, Inti Creates started developing Mega Man Zero without the character as the game's focus. Inafune had originally intended for 2000's Mega Man X5 to be the final game in its own series, ending with Zero's death. When Inafune requested that they make Zero its central character, the company complied and inserted Zero into their draft. Though Zero was mostly depicted as a benevolent hero in the X series, the designers wanted to blur the line between good and evil when drawing up the new game's narrative. This meant having Zero and Ciel's resistance feared by humanity as terrorists and making the Four Guardians and Pantheons protectors of the human race. The game's main antagonist was a popular topic of discussion during production, and the developer often sought input from Capcom in this regard. Tsuda jokingly suggested that they make the original X the final boss, an idea that was at first accepted. According to Ito, Inti Creates realized that it "wouldn't sit so well with the young boys and girls that really do see [X] as a hero", so they replaced him with Copy X just one month before release. It was around this time that the writers designated Ciel as Copy X's creator. Complex explanations were added to the timeline to make this consistent with Ciel's young age. Other parts of the storyline were adjusted towards the end of production to allow for a sequel, as the team felt the characters were "quite memorable in their own right".

The game's characters were designed by Toru Nakayama, while the graphics, concept art, and backgrounds were designed and illustrated by Azuma Honda. Based on Tsuda's ideas, the artists wanted to bridge the franchise's timeline gap between the "mechanical feel" of the X series and the "more human direction" of the Legends series. Inti Creates presented their concept art to Inafune and other members of Capcom at the Tokyo Game Show. Many of the designs were refined at this meeting and, as Nakayama explained, "a lot of trial-and-error ensued". First, Inafune wanted the artists to retain as much of the original Zero as possible, though the character's design was altered so consumers would not confuse the two series. Next, as Nakayama found it difficult to design the Cyber Elves, they were represented as simple balls of light or incomplete portraits within the game. Finally, because the game's Four Guardians had similar body structures and were each initially colored blue like X, Nakayama was forced to color them all differently, so as to make it easier to tell them apart as GBA sprites.

=== Music ===
Ippo Yamada composed all but one track of the musical score for Mega Man Zero; the remaining track "Theme of Zero" from Mega Man X, which composed by Setsuo Yamamoto. Yamada wanted to differentiate the style of music of the Mega Man Zero series from this predecessor by treating it "more like a television or film-like presentation than the stage system like before". Capcom did not immediately publish a soundtrack containing the score for Mega Man Zero. Instead, composer Ippo Yamada directed the release of an arrange album containing remixed versions of the game's songs.

The album, Remastered Tracks Rockman Zero, was released in Japan on January 23, 2004. In addition to the 21 songs, this CD features five drama tracks; commentary tracks by Yamada; an interview with the Inti Creates sound team; character descriptions and an interview with character designer Toru Nakayama; and guest liner notes from artist and manga creator Hitoshi Ariga. The in-game instrumental music was compiled on the Rockman Zero Game Music Complete Works -Rockman Zero 1~3- soundtrack, released in Japan by Suleputer on July 1, 2004.

== Release ==
Mega Man Zero was first announced by Capcom on January 22, 2002 at a press event in Las Vegas. A copy of the game appeared at the 15th Next Generation World Hobby Fair in Japan on the following week on January 28. Mega Man Zero was officially released in Japan on April 26, 2002. The game appeared at the Electronic Entertainment Expo show that May in preparation for its North American release. Mega Man Zero arrived in stores stateside as early as September 10, 2002.

Nintendo announced the game for a December 2002 release in Europe, but it was moved up to October 31 of that year. The game's depictions of violence, specifically the amount of blood, were toned down for its Western localizations. The game was re-released for the Wii U Virtual Console in Japan on October 22, 2014.

Mega Man Zero was made available as part of the Mega Man Zero Collection for the Nintendo DS, which released on June 10, 2010 in North America, and two days later in Japan. The compilation includes a new "Easy Scenario" which allows the player to start with end-game equipment. The game would also be re-released in 2020 as part of the Mega Man Zero/ZX Legacy Collection for PlayStation 4, Xbox One, Nintendo Switch and PC; the compilation includes the original Japanese version, complete with the blood, which resulted in a T for Teen rating.

== Reception ==
Reception

Aggregate scores
Aggregator	Score
GameRankings	81%
Metacritic	82/100

Review scores
Publication	Score
Computer and Video Games	8/10
Electronic Gaming Monthly	8/10
Famitsu	26/40
Game Informer	8.3/10
GamePro	3.5/5
GameSpot	8.2/10
GameSpy	85/100
GameZone	9.1/10
IGN	8.8/10
Jeuxvideo.com	16/20
Nintendo Life	8/10
Nintendo Power	8.4/10

=== Critical response ===
Mega Man Zero has met with a mostly positive critical reception, holding scores of 81% and 82 out of 100 respectively on the aggregate review sites GameRankings and Metacritic. GameSpot named it the second-best Game Boy Advance game of October 2002.

Reviewers across the board agreed that the game was the most difficult in the series, with one reviewer suggesting that it is not for younger or casual players. Avi Fryman of GameSpy states that the ability to give up on missions and still continue the game is a sensible feature of Mega Man Zero, whereas IGN states that given the difficulty of the game, no one would call a player "cheap" if they were to use the newly introduced Cyber Elf system to make boss fights easier.

The game's presentation was critically acclaimed; critics lauded the sprite animation and hand-drawn cutscene images, while the sound was well-received for harkening back to the Super Nintendo days. IGN described Zero as "one of the best-looking Game Boy Advance games out there. In addition to having beautiful graphics, the game also sounds great."

Common complaints with the game were slow down, "unseen deathtraps" and being required to make blind jumps. Reviewers also had lukewarm feelings to the Cyber Elf system. These, however, did not seem to detract much from the gaming experience as reviewers tended to recommend the game in their conclusions.

=== Sales ===
Capcom reported healthy sales of Mega Man Zero during its release period. It was the third best-selling video game in Japan during its week of release at 66,990 units. Famitsu sales data supports that Mega Man Zero sold 135,850 units by June 2002 and 231,166 units by the end of that year in Japan alone.

== Legacy ==
The popularity of Mega Man Zero spawned three direct sequels on the GBA. These games were developed by the same, core team members as the first Mega Man Zero title. Beginning in 2006, Inti Creates began releasing follow-up series on the Nintendo DS comprising two games: Mega Man ZX and Mega Man ZX Advent.

In addition to games, other media related to Mega Man Zero exists. A manga based on the series was written and illustrated by Hideto Kajima and serialized in the monthly Shogakukan magazine CoroCoro Comic from June 2003 to February 2006. An art book titled Mega Man Zero Official Complete Works was published in Japan by Capcom in 2006 and in North America by Udon Entertainment in 2008. The book contains detailed information on the series, promotional artwork, concept designs and sketches, and interviews with the Inti Creates staff.
