= Mega Man ZX Advent =

2007 video game

- North American box art
- Developer: Inti Creates
- Publisher: Capcom
- Directors: Ryota Ito; Yuujirou Hayakawa
- Producers: Takuya Aizu; Takeshi Horinouchi; Keiji Inafune
- Designers: Kinshi Ikegami; Masahiro Mizukoshi; Satoru Nishizawa
- Programmer: Akihiro Shishido
- Artist: Makoto Yabe
- Writers: Makoto Yabe; Kinishi Ikegami
- Composers: Ippo Yamada; Masaki Suzuki; Ryo Kawakami; Kōji Hayama; Luna Umegaki; Akari Kaida
- Series: Mega Man ZX
- Platform: Nintendo DS
- Release: JP: July 12, 2007; NA: October 23, 2007; EU: February 29, 2008; AU: March 5, 2008
- Genres: Action, platform, Metroidvania
- Modes: Single-player, multiplayer

Mega Man ZX Advent (Note: Japanese: ロックマンゼクスアドベント, Hepburn: Rockman ZX Advent; Rokkuman Zekusu Adobento) is a 2007 action-platform game developed by Inti Creates and published by Capcom for the Nintendo DS. Part of the Mega Man franchise, the game is a sequel to Mega Man ZX. The game was first released in Japan on July 12, 2007; in North America on October 23, 2007; in Europe on February 29, 2008; and in Australia on March 5, 2008.

ZX Advent follows two new protagonists, Grey and Ashe, as they battle with various enemy "Mega Men", the infamous Model W, and their own destinies. The gameplay sees a multitude of expansions, including twice as many playable forms. The North American localization also includes a full English voice cast.

During a livestream hosted by Inti Creates, it was divulged that a third Mega Man ZX entry dubbed "ZXC" had been in development, and that ZX series scenario writer Makoto Yabe had written numerous story details in preparation for that game before being cancelled, and Mega Man 9's movement had actually been imported from the playable character of that game.

The game was re-released as part of the Mega Man Zero/ZX Legacy Collection, on February 25, 2020, and February 27, 2020, in Japan, for PlayStation 4, Xbox One, Nintendo Switch and Microsoft Windows.

== Plot ==
=== Setting ===
Mega Man ZX Advent takes place 4 years and 8 months after Mega Man ZX. Despite the destruction of Slither Inc., Maverick raids (attacks by Reploids or robots that cause chaos) continue to occur. The world is in an era known as the Tech Rush, driven by the legal Hunter's Guild and illegal Raiders both seeking valuable ancient technology.

The Biometals, artifacts that can imbue the forms and abilities of ancient heroes into chosen individuals known as "Biomatches" or Mega Men, previously gathered by the protagonist of ZX have been stolen and given to new Biomatches in an effort to advance the "Game of Destiny", a competition orchestrated by Master Albert of the Sage Trinity, where Mega Men would supposedly fight each other to become "Mega Man King". However, this was a ploy in order to feed innocent souls and their negative emotions to "Model W", the first Biometal, in order to awaken its power and enable Albert to "reset the world." However, a new Mega Man (the protagonist, who can be either Ashe or Grey), not chosen intentionally by Albert, emerges with Biometal Model A, a backup Biometal created by Albert with the ability to transform into various entities by absorbing their DNA through "A-Trans".

A coalition government, Legion, serves as the highest authority in the country, and has enacted robot-human equality laws that give humans mechanical parts (making them "Humanoids" or cyborgs) and giving Reploids (fully self-aware robots) lifespans, with both now being considered "human." These pieces of legislation force all Reploids and humans to report to Legion at least once in their lives in order to receive new bodies with limited lifespans. Master Albert would use these laws to implant his DNA into those he deemed worthy of his "Game of Destiny", with most being victims of Maverick raids, allowing them to use Biometals.

=== Characters ===
Advent features a very large cast of characters both new to the series and returning from the first ZX, including the two main protagonists, eight Mega Men, the Sage Trinity, and eight Pseudoroids. Most bosses can be used as playable forms through the A-Trans ability after their first defeat, with several exceptions.

Like the first Mega Man ZX, two protagonists can be chosen. Unlike the first game however, the two have different intro levels and different styles of play, both in their Model A form and the A-Trans Biometal forms.

- Grey serves as the male protagonist. A teenage Reploid (a fully sentient robot) who escaped from a laboratory with amnesia. Despite his amnesia, after being rescued by the Hunters' Guild, he is inspired to return the same kindness to other people. He plays similarly to X of Mega Man X, firing up to three pellets on screen or charging up for a more powerful shot. His "Homing Shot" with Model A fires multiple blasts at targeted enemies.
- Ashe serves as the female protagonist. A teenage Humanoid (a human with cybernetic parts ) who works with the Hunters' Guild after they saved her from a Maverick raids. She is headstrong and confident to a fault, expressing wishes to leave a mark on the world. Ashe features more powerful bullets than Grey, at the cost of only having two on screen. Her fully-charged blast can also reflect off of surfaces. Her Homing Shot fires a single bolt of energy that travels through targeted enemies.
- The Sage Trinity are the ruling triumvirate of Legion. Their names are Master Thomas (マスター・トーマス, Masutā Tōmasu), Master Albert (マスター・アルバート, Masutā Arubāto) and Master Mikhail (マスター・ミハイル, Masutā Mihairu). They were originally human, but in order to continue ruling Legion extended their lives through cybernetics. Unbeknownst to Thomas and Mikhail, Albert is the original creator of Model W and betrays them in order to gather various Model Ws in the world to form the ultimate Biometal, Ouroboros. Using it, he intends to rule a new world as its god. Their names are a reference to Dr. Thomas Light, Dr. Mikhail Cossack and Dr. Albert Wily, the three named roboticists from the original Mega Man games.
- Prometheus and Pandora are two characters returning from the first ZX. In this title, their origins are revealed as sibling creations of Master Albert. In order to enforce their loyalty, Albert gave them limited lifespans that require them to return to capsules to rest. Since their creation, they have been ordered to seek out the strongest Mega Man, but their bitterness toward their creator has led them to create their own agenda. They hope to use Grey/Ashe to bring them closer to Albert and, ultimately, destroy him and everything he has ever worked on.

Humans/Reploids chosen as the Biometals' "Biomatch" are regarded as Mega Men (regardless of the person's gender). Several enemy Mega Men appear throughout the course of Advent who possess the Biometals used from the first ZX. By defeating them in battle, Grey/Ashe is able to copy their forms via A-Trans, but they never actually attain the Biometals.

- Aeolus (ヘリオス, Heriosu; Helios in the Japanese version) is the Biomatch for Model H, the Wind Mega Man. Aeolus is a perfectionist and thus very condescending. He views the world's chaos as a result of ignorance. Model H is modeled after Sage Harpuia of the Mega Man Zero series.
- Atlas (アトラス, Atorasu) is the Biomatch for Model F, the Flame Mega Man. She was originally a soldier for a country destroyed by Mavericks, and plays the Game of Destiny to speed up the evolutionary process. Model F is modeled after Fighting Fefnir of the Mega Man Zero series.
- Thetis (テティス, Tetisu; Tethys in the Japanese version) is the Biomatch for Model L, the Ice Mega Man. On the surface, Thetis is a kind, normal boy, but hides a radically environmentalist agenda. Model L is modeled after Fairy Leviathan of the Mega Man Zero series.
- Siarnaq (シャルナク, Sharunaku) is the Biomatch for Model P, the Shadow Mega Man. Siarnaq is exceedingly cold and machinelike in his demeanor, always speaking in a robotic monotone, which is apparently due to incidents in his past, which include betrayal and being left for dead. Model P is modeled after Hidden Phantom of the Mega Man Zero series.
- The protagonists of the first ZX title also return: Vent (ヴァン, Van) (who appears in Ashe's story) and Aile (エール, Ēru) (who appears in Grey's story). They are the Biomatches for Model X, but they also use Model Z (previously owned by their mentor, Giro, from the previous game) in a combined form, Model ZX, as the "Ultimate Mega Man". These two are also seeking Model W to destroy it, and after a misunderstanding, they become allies with Grey/Ashe, aiding in the infiltration of Ouroboros. Model X is based on X from the Mega Man X series while Model Z is based on the incarnation of Zero from the Mega Man Zero series.

=== Pseudoroids ===
The eight Pseudoroids can also become playable upon destroying them in battle. Although the Biometal forms all use similar abilities (such as dashing and wall climbing), the Pseudoroid forms vary greatly in basic movement and abilities. There are two Pseudoroids to represent each element (fire, ice, and electricity) and two with no element, akin to the first ZX title.

=== Plot ===
The player chooses between two protagonists: Grey, a Reploid boy who awakens with amnesia in a mysterious lab, or Ashe, an orphaned Humanoid girl who was raised by Hunters. Both are attacked — Grey by Pandora after awakening in the laboratory, and Ashe by Prometheus during scuffle with Raider airships — and are rescued, finding themselves at Hunter's Camp. After receiving a Hunter's License, they board a train to deliver a Biometal to the capital, Legion HQ. En route, the train is attacked by Prometheus and Pandora. The Biometal calls out to the protagonist, allowing them to Megamerge into Mega Man Model A. Fascinated, Prometheus and Pandora spare them. After defeating a Pseudoroid, Mega Man Model A learns how to use A-Trans, the power to copy the DNA of defeated foes to shapeshift into them.

The damaged train cannot reach Legion HQ, so the Sage Trinity (Master Thomas, Master Albert, and Master Mikhail) order Mega Man Model A to repair it so they can deliver the Biometal. Along the way, they battle Pseudoroids and confront four rival Mega Men (Atlas, Thetis, Aeolus, and Siarnaq) who are competing in a so-called Game of Destiny. After rescuing Raiders from Atlas and copying her DNA, a cipher within Model A reveals the Game of Destiny's goal: collect all pieces of Model W and awaken them using negative emotions to become a Mega Man King who rules the world. The Raiders help repair the train, allowing Mega Man Model A to reach Legion HQ, only to find it under attack by Siarnaq. Defeating him unlocks a cipher revealing Master Albert as the mastermind behind the Game of Destiny, but he escapes. Master Thomas orders Mega Man Model A to stop Albert's scheme.

After fighting more Pseudoroids, Mega Man Model A encounters the protagonist of Mega Man ZX — Aile (if playing as Grey) or Vent (if playing as Ashe) — who wields Models Z and X. After a brief misunderstanding, they join forces to track down the remaining Model W pieces, including defeating Thetis and Aeolus. This unlocks more ciphers, revealing that all Mega Men share Albert's DNA, as he implanted it into chosen subjects when they visited Legion for equality procedures (limiting lifespans of Reploids and granting Humanoids mechanical bodies). However, Albert ultimately retrieves almost all of Model W. Mega Man Model A tracks him to an undersea base, where Prometheus and Pandora suddenly betray Albert to free themselves from his service. However, the pair's centuries of hatred awakens the remaining Model W pieces, allowing Albert to reveal his survival and merge them into a fortress called Ouroboros, planning to use its power to destroy and remake the world.

With the help of the Hunters, Mega Man Model A infiltrates Ouroboros, defeats the resurrected Pseudoroids, evades the rival Mega Men thanks to Vent/Aile, and confronts Albert. Albert reveals the protagonist's true origins — Model A contains his data ("A" standing for Albert), Grey is one of his creations, and Ashe is his direct descendant — making them his intended successors. He asks them to join him, but Mega Man Model A refuses, defeats Albert, and destroys Ouroboros. With peace restored, they part ways with Vent/Aile and embark on a new journey with Model A to forge their own destiny.

In a special cutscene unlocked by beating the game's Extreme Mode, Master Thomas reveals to Master Mikhail that he disagreed with Albert's methods but agrees with his goal. As the rival Mega Men return, revealing they survived the fall of Ouroboros, Thomas states that he has a plan of his own involving the confiscated human bodies and Reploid data collected from Legion's equality laws.

== Gameplay ==
A screenshot depicting Grey battling on the train to Legion.

Many of the elements from Mega Man ZX return, including the 2D world and several missions and collection side-quests, as well as much of the gameplay. The players begin the game in their normal forms and can revert to them at any time. like the previous installment, the game implements metroidvania concepts into the level design, with more exploration elements than the main Mega Man series, with new upgrades allowing players to back-track and acquire other normally unreachable upgrades.

=== Other features ===
Advent features several difficulty settings. Beginner simplifies the gameplay by weakening enemy's defenses and attacks and disabling instant-defeat obstacles among other things. By completing the game on Normal, Expert mode can be unlocked, and upon completing it, an extended ending can be viewed. Expert Mode also limits the gameplay for the player in being able to collect only one Sub-Tank, and removing all the Life-Up and Bio-Metal Upgrades.

The dual screen received some upgrades where it now has a secondary screen of allowing the player to switch between forms instantly without having to use the transformation button to help select the form the player wishes to use. Also the weapon energy system has been modified where now all forms share the weapon energy meter, but with the new benefit that aside from weapon energy capsules, the meter can now slowly refill itself over time. Like with the Life Meter it starts off small, but collecting the Bio-Metal Upgrades can expand the maximum weapon energy meter.

The Database from the first ZX returns. Eighty-five secret disks are scattered throughout the game with descriptions and images of the characters and enemies in the game. Several special disks are also featured, including an image of the infamous North American box art for the original NES game. Along with the secret disks, there are several equippable chip items that can enhance the players abilities, such as preventing the effects of wind and ice on the player's footing. A hidden room in the game will also give the player special items for each month of the year.

Furthermore, 24 medals can be collected depending on how the eight Pseudoroids are defeated in battle. Gold, silver, and bronze medals can be received for each Pseudoroid depending on the difficulty of the task involved. Tasks sometimes include what attack or form the enemy is defeated with, what part of their body is attacked, or the amount of time they're defeated in.

The game features a few unlockable mini-games. Quiz Advent requires the player to identify twenty characters with three visual obstructions. A mini-game from the first title, Gem Buster is now only playable between two players over an ad hoc network. Two boss mini-games called Survival Road and Boss Battle can be unlocked. Finally, Mega Man a (the "a" standing for "ancient" or "antique") is an imitation of the original 8-bit Mega Man games on the Nintendo Entertainment System using ZX characters and music. The Model a character can also be used in the main game as a result of New Game Plus, but only if the player obtained the 24 aforementioned medals in the previous game, but unlike the other forms, it can only be accessed with the transformation button, instead of the dual-screen transformation ability.

In Mega Man Zero/ZX Legacy Collection, much like the original Mega Man ZX, the original dual-screen features have also been changed to a support screen, where its position is based on the setting the player chooses. In addition the new Casual Scenario Mode replaces Beginner Mode, which is activated from the main menu of the collection when selecting this game which serves the same purpose.

== Audio ==
Rockman ZX Advent Soundtrack -ZXA Tunes- is the second remastered soundtrack album to be released for the Mega Man ZX series released on August 30, 2007, by Inti Creates. Unlike the first soundtrack, ZX Tunes, which was first released in limited numbers, ZXA Tunes was released nationwide immediately in Japan. Capcom's online store also provided a limited edition bonus for pre-ordering the soundtrack: a ZX Advent mousepad featuring ZXA heroine Ashe "crashing" in ZX hero Vent's pad.

Ashe Disc
No.	Title	Length
1.	"Go For It !" (Vocal: Kaoru Akiyama)
2.	"Through the Lightning"
3.	"Relief"
4.	"Target Chaser"
5.	"Slam Down"
6.	"Twisted Vine"
7.	"Flashover"
8.	"Bullet Drive"
9.	"Be One" (Vocal: CAO)
10.	"In the Wind"
11.	"Overloaded"
12.	"Rush Trash Squash"
13.	"Brimstone"
14.	"Evil Heritage"
15.	"Determined Eyes"
16.	"Oriental Sentinels"
17.	"Organic Line"
18.	"Path to the Truth"
19.	"Trap Phantasm"

Grey Disc
No.	Title	Length
1.	"Dive into Depth"
2.	"Destiny"
3.	"Drifting Floe"
4.	"Dance Macabre - Second Act -"
5.	"Chun hsu wei lai (尋求未来; lit. "Seeking the Future")" (Vocal: Sheng Zhiheng)
6.	"Whisper of Relics"
7.	"Uroboros"
8.	"United Forces"
9.	"The Chosen One"
10.	"Soul Ablaze"
11.	"Divine Hammer"
12.	"Den of Hunters"
13.	"Mirai e Tsuzuku Kaze (未来へ続く風; lit. "A Wind Continuing Toward the Future")" (Vocal: Toru Itoga)
14.	"Rockman a ( antique ) Remix"
15.	"Go For It ! - Karaoke Version -"
16.	"Be One - Karaoke Version -"
17.	"Chun hsu wei lai (尋求未来 - Karaoke Version -)"
18.	"Mirai e Tsuzuku Kaze (未来へ続く風 - Karaoke Version -)"

Rockman ZX Soundsketch "ZX Gigamix" is the third album to be created for the Mega Man ZX series, released on April 30, 2008, by Inti Creates. Among the album are Soundsketches and ZX portraits; these are drama tracks that provide insight to events in the Mega Man ZX series. Composer Ippo Yamada explains a Soundsketch as "when you listen carefully in a room that seems silent, you can hear all sorts of sounds like the hum of appliances, the tick of a clock and the environment outside the window."

ZX Gigamix
No.	Title	Length
1.	"The Chosen One - Gigamix Ver. -"
2.	"Green Grass Gradation - Gigamix Ver. -"
3.	"Grey Capsule - Soundsketch -"
4.	"Believe in Myself - featuring Grey -"
5.	"Whisper of Relics - Gigamix Ver. -"
6.	"Death and Witch - ZX portrait -"
7.	"Drifting Floe - Gigamix Ver. -"
8.	"Overloaded - Gigamix Ver. -"
9.	"Help Fleuve! - Soundsketch -"
10.	"Flow of the Times"
11.	"Bullet Drive - Gigamix Ver. -"
12.	"Brilliant Show Window - Gigamix Ver. -"
13.	"Girls Bravo - ZX portrait -"
14.	"En-trance Code - Gigamix Ver. -"
15.	"Freebirds"
16.	"Reconstruction of Cinq Ville - Soundsketch -"
17.	"Be One - featuring Ashe -"
18.	"Awake - Gigamix Ver. -"
19.	"Trap Fanatics"
20.	"Battle Giga Mixture"

== Reception ==
Reception

Aggregate scores
Aggregator	Score
GameRankings	78%
Metacritic	78/100

Review scores
Publication	Score
1Up.com	B
Eurogamer	6/10
Famitsu	31/40
GameSpot	7.5/10
IGN	8/10
Nintendo Power	8.5/10
Play	8.5/10

Critical reaction to the game has been mostly positive. IGN stated, "It's a fairly long and deep experience, though it's by no means a perfect game. However, the good certainly outweighs the bad, and we can't help but recommend this game as a result." GameSpot cited the main problem as the game's difficulty being a bit too high for the casual gamer. Game Informer magazine gave the game an overall score of 7 out of 10, praising the easier game navigation and the ability to transform into boss characters after defeating them, and commenting that Mega Man ZX Advent was entertaining because of how it stays true to the basic elements of the earlier Mega Man games.

Mega Man ZX Advent was the tenth-best-selling game in Japan during its release week at 21,379 units sold. 63,977 units of the game were sold in the region by the end of 2007.
