= Inti Creates =

Japanese video game developer

Inti Creates Co., Ltd.
- Native name: 株式会社インティ・クリエイツ
- Romanized name: Kabushiki gaisha Inti Kurieitsu
- Type: Kabushiki gaisha
- Industry: Video games
- Founded: May 8, 1996; 30 years ago
- Headquarters: Ichikawa, Chiba, Japan
- Key people: Takuya Aizu (President); Yoshihisa Tsuda (Vice president); Ippo Yamada (Director)
- Number of employees: 98
- Website: inticreates.com

Inti Creates Co., Ltd. (株式会社インティ・クリエイツ, Kabushiki gaisha Inti Kurieitsu) is a Japanese video game development company. Formed by ex-Capcom staff in May 1996, they are best known for developing games in the Mega Man series, namely the Mega Man Zero series and its follow-ups Mega Man ZX and Mega Man ZX Advent, as well as their flagship Azure Striker Gunvolt and Gal Gun franchises.

== History ==
Inti Creates was founded by ten former members of Capcom, with Takuya Aizu as CEO. In a 2019 interview, Aizu said the company's founders initially found it difficult to find a company willing to publish its games because they were not yet well-known developers. He said that one of the company's members successfully applied to Sony Music Entertainment's Club Dev program, which led to negotiations that secured funding to establish the company.

The company's vice president, Yoshihisa Tsuda, repeatedly expressed an interest in developing a Mega Man game during conversations with Keiji Inafune, who later invited the studio to submit a proposal that ultimately led to the Mega Man Zero series.

Initially established as a limited liability company, it became a publicly traded company in 2003.

The company expanded by opening a studio in Nagoya in 2008.

In 2011, Inti Creates began collaborating with WayForward on the Shantae series after being hired to work on Shantae and the Pirate's Curse. The company continued its work on Shantae: Half-Genie Hero, contributing key artwork, concepts, and character illustrations.

In 2014, Inti Creates released its first self-published games, Azure Striker Gunvolt and its cross-promotional title Mighty Gunvolt. In a 2015 interview, Aizu said the company had decided to become a publisher after seeing Keiji Inafune establish his own company and publish games. He also cited the decline of the Japanese console market and the company's desire to reach a global audience as factors in the decision.

Inti Creates collaborated with Keiji Inafune and Comcept on Mighty No. 9.

In a 2018 interview, Aizu attributed many of the development difficulties of Mighty No. 9 to shortcomings in the Kickstarter campaign's financial planning. He said that Kickstarter fees, backer rewards, and additional platform and feature promises substantially reduced the available budget while expanding the project's scope.

The company later collaborated with producer Koji Igarashi on the game Bloodstained: Ritual of the Night, but left the project after E3 2016 with DICO taking over development.

Inti Creates subsequently developed and released the 2D action-platformer Bloodstained: Curse of the Moon in 2018. The game sold more than 100,000 copies within two weeks of its release.

In a 2019 interview, Aizu said the company had focused its international publishing efforts on the United States, the United Kingdom, and China, describing them as markets where players were more receptive to independent games.

Several of the company's collaborations were facilitated by platform holders, according to Aizu. He credited an introduction by Nintendo of America for including Shovel Knight in Azure Striker Gunvolt 2 and Blaster Master Zero, and said that a chance meeting between Sunsoft and Nintendo at E3 led to the development of Blaster Master Zero.

== Games ==
Year	Title	Platform(s)	Publisher(s)	Ref.
1998	Speed Power Gunbike	PlayStation	Sony Music Entertainment	
1999	Love & Destroy	PlayStation	Sony Computer Entertainment	
2002	Kurohige no Golf Shiyouyo	Game Boy Advance	Tomy Corporation	
2002	Mega Man Zero	Game Boy Advance	Capcom	
2003	Mega Man Battle Chip Challenge	Game Boy Advance	Capcom	
2003	Mega Man Zero 2	Game Boy Advance	Capcom	
2004	Crayon Shin-Chan Arashi o Yobu Cinema-Land no Daibouken!	Game Boy Advance		
2004	Mega Man Zero 3	Game Boy Advance	Capcom	
2005	Mega Man Zero 4	Game Boy Advance	Capcom	
2005	Fantastic Children	Game Boy Advance	Bandai	
2006	Crayon Shin-Chan Densetsu o Yobu Omake no To Shokkugaan!	Game Boy Advance		
2006	Mega Man ZX	Nintendo DS	Capcom	
2006	Eureka 7 V.1: New Wave	PlayStation Portable	Namco Bandai Games	
2007	Crayon Shin-Chan DS: Arashi o Yobu Nutte Crayo~n Daisakusen!	Nintendo DS	Namco Bandai Games	
2007	Mega Man ZX Advent	Nintendo DS	Capcom	
2007	Kabu Trader Shun	Nintendo DS	Capcom	
2008	Doraemon Nobita to Midori no Kyojinden	Nintendo DS	Namco Bandai Games	
2008	Crayon Shin-Chan Arashi o Yobu Cinema-Land Kachinkogachinko Daikatsugeki!	Nintendo DS	Namco Bandai Games	
2008	Mega Man 9	Wii, PlayStation 3, Xbox 360	Capcom	
2009	Crayon Shin-Chan Arashi o Yobu Nendororo~n Daihenshin	Nintendo DS	Namco Bandai Games	
2009	Chougekijouban Keroro Gunsou: Gekishin Dragon Warriors de Arimasu!	Nintendo DS	Namco Bandai Games	
2010	Crayon Shin-Chan Obaka Daininden Susume! Kasukabe Ninja Tai!	Nintendo DS	Namco Bandai Games	
2010	Keshikasu-kun Battle Kas-tival	Nintendo DS	Namco Bandai Games	
2010	Do-Konjou Shogakussei Bon Bita Hadaka no Choujou Ketsusen!! Bita vs. Dokuro Dei!	Nintendo DS	Namco Bandai Games	
2010	Mega Man 10	Wii, PlayStation 3, Xbox 360	Capcom	
2010	Mega Man Zero Collection	Nintendo DS	Capcom	
2011	Power Rangers Samurai: The Game	Nintendo DS, Wii	Namco Bandai Games	
2011	Gal Gun	Xbox 360, PlayStation 3	Alchemist	
2011	Crayon Shin-Chan Uchuu DE Achoo!? Yuujoo no Obakarate!!	Nintendo 3DS	Namco Bandai Games	
2011	Bokura no Kingdom	Mobile		
2012	Great Battle Fullblast	PlayStation Portable	Namco Bandai Games	
2012	Naruto SD Powerful Shippuden	Nintendo 3DS	Namco Bandai Games	
2012	Gon: Baku Baku Baku Baku Adventure	Nintendo 3DS	Namco Bandai Games	
2012	J.J. Rockets	Mobile	Marvelous AQL	
2012	Dangerous Jiisan to 1000-nin no Otomodachi Ja	Nintendo 3DS	Namco Bandai Games	
2013	Pac-Man and the Ghostly Adventures	Nintendo 3DS	Namco Bandai Games	
2013	Battle Dodge Ball 3	PlayStation Portable	Namco Bandai Games	
2014	Fujiko F. Fujio Characters Daishuugou! SF Dotabata Party!!	Nintendo 3DS, Wii U	Namco Bandai Games	
2014	Azure Striker Gunvolt	Nintendo 3DS, Windows, Xbox One, Xbox Series X/S	Inti Creates	
2014	Mighty Gunvolt	Nintendo 3DS, PlayStation 4, PlayStation Vita, Windows	Inti Creates	
2015	Mysterious Joker: The Phantom Thief Who Crosses Time & the Lost Gem	Nintendo 3DS	Namco Bandai Games	
2015	Gal Gun: Double Peace	PlayStation 4, PlayStation Vita, Windows	PQube, Alchemist	
2016	Azure Striker Gunvolt 2	Nintendo 3DS, Windows, Xbox One, Xbox Series X/S	Inti Creates	
2016	Azure Striker Gunvolt: Striker Pack	Nintendo 3DS, Nintendo Switch, PlayStation 4	Inti Creates, Yacht Club Games	
2016	Mighty No. 9	Windows, PlayStation 3, PlayStation 4, Wii U, Xbox 360, Xbox One, Mac OS X, Linux	Deep Silver, Spike Chunsoft	
2016	Digimon Universe: App Monsters	Nintendo 3DS	Bandai Namco Entertainment	
2017	Blaster Master Zero	Nintendo 3DS, Nintendo Switch, Windows, PlayStation 4, Xbox One, Xbox Series X/S	Inti Creates	
2017	Gal Gun VR	Windows	Inti Creates	
2017	Mighty Gunvolt Burst	Nintendo 3DS, Nintendo Switch, PlayStation 4, Windows	Inti Creates	
2018	Bakutsuri Bar Hunter	Nintendo 3DS	Bandai Namco Entertainment	
2018	Bloodstained: Curse of the Moon	Windows, PlayStation 4, PlayStation Vita, Nintendo Switch, Nintendo 3DS, Xbox One	Inti Creates	
2018	Gal Gun 2	Nintendo Switch, PlayStation 4, Windows	Inti Creates	
2019	Bakutsuri Hunters	Nintendo Switch	Bandai Namco Entertainment	
2019	Blaster Master Zero 2	Nintendo Switch, Windows, PlayStation 4, Xbox One, Xbox Series X/S	Inti Creates	
2019	Dragon Marked for Death	Nintendo Switch, Windows, PlayStation 4	Inti Creates	
2019	Gunvolt Chronicles: Luminous Avenger iX	Nintendo Switch, PlayStation 4, Windows, Xbox One	Inti Creates	
2020	Bloodstained: Curse of the Moon 2	Windows, PlayStation 4, Nintendo Switch, Xbox One	Inti Creates	
2021	Blaster Master Zero 3	Windows, PlayStation 4, Nintendo Switch, Xbox One, Xbox Series X/S	Inti Creates	
2021	Blaster Master Zero Trilogy: MetaFight Chronicle	Nintendo Switch, PlayStation 4	Inti Creates	
2021	Gal Gun Returns	Windows, Nintendo Switch	PQube	
2022	Azure Striker Gunvolt 3	Nintendo Switch, Xbox One, Xbox Series X/S, Windows, PlayStation 4, PlayStation 5	Inti Creates	
2022	Gal Gun: Double Peace	Nintendo Switch	PQube	
2022	Gunvolt Chronicles: Luminous Avenger iX 2	Windows, PlayStation 4, PlayStation 5, Nintendo Switch, Xbox One, Xbox Series X/S	Inti Creates	
2023	Bloodstained: Curse of the Moon Chronicles	Nintendo Switch, PlayStation 4	Inti Creates	
2023	Gal Guardians: Demon Purge	Windows, PlayStation 4, PlayStation 5, Nintendo Switch, Xbox One, Xbox Series X/S	Inti Creates	
2023	Yohane the Parhelion: Blaze in the Deepblue	Windows, PlayStation 4, PlayStation 5, Nintendo Switch, Xbox One, Xbox Series X/S	Inti Creates	
2024	Gunvolt Records: Cychronicle	Windows, PlayStation 4, PlayStation 5, Nintendo Switch, Xbox One, Xbox Series X/S	Inti Creates	
2024	Inti Creates Gold Archive Collection	Nintendo Switch	Inti Creates	
2024	PuzzMiX	Windows, PlayStation 4, PlayStation 5, Nintendo Switch, Xbox One, Xbox Series X/S	Inti Creates	
2024	Umbraclaw	Windows, PlayStation 4, PlayStation 5, Nintendo Switch, Xbox One, Xbox Series X/S	Inti Creates	
2024	Card-en-Ciel	Nintendo Switch, Nintendo Switch 2, Xbox One, Xbox Series X/S, Windows, PlayStation 4, PlayStation 5	Inti Creates	
2024	Divine Dynamo Flamefrit	Nintendo Switch, Xbox One, Xbox Series X/S, Windows, PlayStation 4, PlayStation 5	Inti Creates	
2025	Azure Striker Gunvolt Trilogy Enhanced	Nintendo Switch, PlayStation 5, Windows	Inti Creates	
2025	Gal Guardians: Servants of the Dark	Nintendo Switch, Xbox One, Xbox Series X/S, Windows, PlayStation 4, PlayStation 5, Nintendo Switch 2	Inti Creates	
2025	Majogami	Nintendo Switch, Nintendo Switch 2, Windows	Inti Creates	
2026	Kingdom's Return: Time-Eating Fruit and the Ancient Monster	Nintendo Switch, Nintendo Switch 2, Xbox Series X/S, PlayStation 5, Windows	Inti Creates	
2026	Gunvolt Chronicles: Luminous Avenger iX 1+2 Dual Collection	Nintendo Switch, Nintendo Switch 2, PlayStation 5, Windows	Inti Creates	
TBA	Gunvolt Chronicles: Luminous Avenger iX 3	Nintendo Switch 2, Windows	Inti Creates	
