= Mega Man Zero 2 =

2003 video game

- North American cover art
- Developer: Inti Creates
- Publisher: Capcom
- Directors: Ryota Ito; Yoshinori Kawano
- Producers: Takuya Aizu; Keiji Inafune
- Designer: Yoshihisa Tsuda
- Programmers: Takayuki Inoue; Kazutaka Yanagisawa; Akihiro Shishido; Tomoyuki Kajihara
- Artist: Toru Nakayama
- Composers: Masaki Suzuki; Luna Umegaki; Tsutomu Kurihara
- Series: Mega Man Zero
- Platform: Game Boy Advance
- Release: JP: May 2, 2003; NA: October 14, 2003; EU: October 31, 2003
- Genres: Platform, hack and slash
- Modes: Single-player, multiplayer

Mega Man Zero 2 (Note: Known in Japan as Rockman Zero 2 (Japanese: ロックマンゼロ2,, Hepburn: Rokkuman Zero Tsū)) is a 2003 hack and slash platform game developed by Inti Creates and published by Capcom for the Game Boy Advance (GBA) handheld game console. It is the second video game in the Mega Man Zero subseries of Mega Man video games.

The game is set one year following the events of Mega Man Zero, and follows the same basic format as its predecessor, being a side-scrolling, platform action game. Once again, players take control of the Reploid known as Zero, and lead him through various levels in the battle against the forces of Neo Arcadia.

The European version also released the same day as Mega Man X7 was in North America. It was released in Japan on the Wii U's Virtual Console on January 7, 2015. In February 2020, the game was released on PlayStation 4, Xbox One, Nintendo Switch, and PC via Steam as part of the Mega Man Zero/ZX Legacy Collection.

== Plot ==
One year has passed since Zero defeated Copy X. He has since separated from Ciel and the Resistance, now wandering the desert and defeating countless Pantheons. The three surviving members of the Four Guardians have assumed command of Neo Arcadia, with Harpuia as the leader. Copy X's death was covered up, as the humans revered him as their savior. The Resistance is now being led by a Reploid named Elpizo, while Ciel continues her work on a new form of energy that will hopefully eliminate the need for war.

Zero wearily makes his way through a sandstorm wrapped in a tattered cloak. As the sands die down he is once more being chased by enemies. Despite being in disrepair, with cracked armor and broken weapons, he charges into the fray. After the battle, Zero collapses from exhaustion and is found by Harpuia. Wishing to see Zero die in battle rather than perish from exhaustion, Harpuia rescues Zero and covertly delivers him to a location near the Resistance base, where he is found and repaired. He learns that Elpizo is planning a frontal assault on Neo Arcadia, as he doesn't believe in Ciel's plan of creating energy as means to resolve the war. Unable to convince him to call it off, Zero is left to do busy-work in the meantime.

Elpizo's assault fails miserably, himself being the only survivor. Driven mad, he declares his desire to harness the power of the legendary Dark Elf to destroy Neo Arcadia (and wipe out the humans), which had brought about the Elf Wars a century ago that left the Earth in a disastrous state. Using the powers granted by partially unsealing the Dark Elf, he invades Neo Arcadia and breaks into the temple where the body of the real X is kept. It is revealed that X ended the Elf Wars by sealing the Dark Elf away with his body, thus leading to his disappearance. Despite the Guardians' and Zero's best efforts, Elpizo destroys X's body, which unseals the Dark Elf, and Elpizo absorbs its powers.

After a fierce battle, Zero puts an end to Elpizo's plans, who reverts to his normal self and apologizes as he dies. Surprisingly, the Dark Elf turns him into a Cyber-elf, convincing Elpizo that she is not truly evil. As the Dark Elf departs, X appears and tells Zero about the Dark Elf: she was originally known as the Mother Elf and was the savior who ended the Maverick Wars, but was later cursed by a man named Dr. Weil. Zero admits to feeling like he knows her.

In a post credits scene, an unknown man notes the Dark Elf has been released, and tells an entity known as "Omega" that it is time to take action.

== Gameplay ==
The controls are identical to that in the previous game, with players given the option to assign functions to the buttons they are most comfortable using. The weapons are also identical, with the exception of the Triple Rod, which has been replaced by the similar but somewhat more complex Chain Rod.

Cyber Elves are present in the game, and function in the same manner as they did in the previous game. However, unlike the first game, in which four specific Cyber Elves could be transformed into health-storing Sub-Tanks, two of the four Sub-Tanks are now hidden in various stages as collectible items, as they were in the previous series, while the remaining two must be unlocked using Cyber Elves.

While the first game in the series had the player select missions from a list, Mega Man Zero 2 returns to the traditional Stage Select option found in the Mega Man and Mega Man X games, although the player can only select from four at a time. In addition, whereas Mega Man Zero had a large, interconnected world, none of the stages in this game are linked.

New features added to the game are Forms and EX Skills. Forms are unlocked by completing various tasks during a mission, such as destroying a set number of enemies with the Buster Shot. Forms alter Zero's abilities in various ways, such as increasing the power of certain weapons or making him more resilient. However, they also tend to decrease performance in other areas, such as lowering attack power for increased defense or removing special attacks of the Z-Saber to enhance the Buster Shot. EX Skills are unlocked if a player completes a mission with an A or S rank, allowing the player to give Zero's weapons the properties of the bosses he's defeated.

Players begin the game with the Buster Shot and the Z-Saber. After the introductory mission, Zero is granted the Shield Boomerang and the Chain Rod, which replaces the Triple Rod in the previous game. As with the previous game, the player can unlock new attacks and abilities for the weapons through repeated use. There are fewer upgrades in this game; the Z-Saber has a total of four upgrades, while the rest only have two.

Cyber Elves function in the same manner as the previous game, being single-use aids with either temporary or permanent effects on Zero or the game's levels. They are hidden throughout the game as well as dropped by enemies. The use of Cyber Elves penalizes the mission score. There are three types of Cyber Elves, "Nurse", "Animal", and "Hacker". While certain Elves can be used immediately, the larger Elves need to be fed crystals in order to be used. The cost for doing so is significantly less than it was in the previous game.

This game introduces the concept of Forms, which can be earned by meeting certain criteria throughout the game, ranging from killing twenty enemies in a stage with a dashing slash technique to getting twenty-five energy capsules in one stage.

Another new addition to the series is EX Skills, which are similar to Mega Man's ability to copy powers from the bosses in previous series. Unlike the previous series, however, Zero has to have an A or S rank going into the stage to unlock the bosses EX Skill. Unlike Mega Man's copy ability, which required weapon energy to feed the attacks, EX Skills modify Zero's weapons, adding new abilities or replacing their normal abilities with an ability similar to the defeated boss. For example, the Buster Shot can be modified to fire a long-piercing beam instead of its normal charged blast, while the Z-Saber gains additional moves such as a powerful rising slash.

As with the first game, a "New Game Plus" can be played by beating the game and loading the completed save file. In the new game, Zero will start with all activated Cyber Elves used from the previous game still in effect (the penalties, however, will still remain). Zero will also get to keep any EX Skills and alternate forms that he earned in the previous game. Additional modes can also be unlocked under proper conditions.

Hard Mode is unlocked by beating the game once. To play, hold L when selecting to start a New Game. In Hard Mode, Zero starts with the "Proto Form", which doubles his attack strength but halves his defense and locks his weapons at their basic level. Zero also cannot earn any EX skills or alternate forms. Beating Hard Mode will unlock a special "Image Gallery" option. Hold L and Select when selecting New Game to enter it.

Unlike the other games in the series, there is no Ultimate Mode to be unlocked. However, an "Ultimate Form" can be unlocked by leveling up and using every Cyber Elf in the game. It increases all of Zero's stats and also allows him to use full-charge attacks instantly by means of simplistic button combos.

=== Multiplayer ===
With two cartridges and a link cable, players can link two GBAs and take part in a two-player game. There are three modes available to take part in:

- Time Attack - Set a goal somewhere in the stage. After three tries, the player with the shortest time to the goal wins.
- Enemy Battle - Defeat the most enemies from the generator within the time limit.
- Get Item - Collect the most items from the map within the time limit.

== Reception ==
Reception

Aggregate scores
Aggregator	Score
GameRankings	82%
Metacritic	81/100

Review scores
Publication	Score
1Up.com	B−
Famitsu	31/40
Game Informer	7/10
GamePro	4.5/5
GameSpot	8.6/10
GameSpy	4/5
IGN	8/10
Nintendo Power	7.8/10
Play	10/10

Mega Man Zero 2 was the seventh best-selling video game in Japan during its week of release at 53,839 copies and climbed to the number one spot the following week with an additional 25,283 copies sold. The game appeared on Famitsu magazine's top 30 best-sellers list for the following four weeks. By the end of 2003, Mega Man Zero 2 had sold 158,479 copies in Japan alone.

A common remark is that the game has not changed much in its formula since its predecessor, though they do acknowledge that improvements have been made to the stage select menus. A general complaint is the difficulty of the game, with one reviewer expressing concern that the difficulty would put some people off the game.
