= Mega Man Zero 4 =

2005 video game

- North American cover art
- Developer: Inti Creates
- Publisher: Capcom
- Directors: Ryota Ito; Yoshinori Kawano
- Producers: Takuya Aizu; Keiji Inafune; Ken Horinouchi
- Designers: Masahiro Mizukoshi; Yoshiaki Iwanaga
- Programmers: Kazutaka Yanagisawa; Toyohiro Serita; Tomoyuki Kajihara; Ken Murakami
- Artist: Toru Nakayama
- Writer: Makoto Yabe
- Composers: Ippo Yamada; Masaki Suzuki; Luna Umegaki; Shinichi Itakura
- Series: Mega Man Zero
- Platform: Game Boy Advance
- Release: JP: April 21, 2005; NA: October 4, 2005; AU: September 14, 2005; EU: September 16, 2005
- Genres: Platform, hack and slash
- Mode: Single-player

Mega Man Zero 4 (Note: Known in Japan as Rockman Zero 4 (Japanese: ロックマンゼロ4,, Hepburn: Rokkuman Zero Fō)) is a 2005 hack and slash platform game developed by Inti Creates and published by Capcom for the Game Boy Advance. It is the fourth and final installment of the Mega Man Zero subseries of the Mega Man franchise and is set several months after the events of Mega Man Zero 3.

The game deals with the effects of Dr. Weil's reign over Neo Arcadia, established at the end of the previous game. Oppressed humans begin to escape in large numbers to the last-known habitable location on the planet, Area Zero, prompting violent retribution from Neo Arcadia. The effects of this conflict eventually drive Zero and the Resistance to protect Area Zero and its inhabitants from Dr. Weil.

Since its original release, it has been brought to the Nintendo DS family of systems as part of the Mega Man Zero Collection in 2010 and the Wii U's Virtual Console in 2016. In February 2020, it was released on PC (Steam), Nintendo Switch, PlayStation 4, and Xbox One as part of the Mega Man Zero/ZX Legacy Collection.

== Gameplay ==
The fourth installment of the Mega Man Zero series introduces gameplay changes, but does not deviate from the platforming of its predecessors. Players guide Zero through eight main selectable stages, which are usually separated into two parts by a mini-boss battle. At the end of each level, the player faces one of the game's reploid antagonists.

Mega Man Zero 4 includes a new Easy Mode, not found in its prequels, in response to criticisms that the Mega Man Zero series had become too challenging. In Easy Mode, Zero receives a large life boost and can use the Cyber Elf without restrictions. However, Easy Mode prevents the changing of the weather, and consequentially the acquiring of EX Skills.

Zero is still equipped with the Buster Shot and Z-Saber at default. However, in place of the Shield Boomerang and the rod-type weapon from the previous games (i.e.: Triple Rod, Chain Rod and Recoil Rod) is the new Z-Knuckle. This device allows Zero to perform several actions, including hanging from pipes, destroying obstacles, stealing an enemy's weapon (if Zero destroys it using the Z-Knuckle) and acquiring special weapons in certain parts of a stage.

The weather system can be used to change level conditions, making levels potentially easier.

Another new element is the weather system, which allows players to choose between two weather conditions for each of the eight main stages. The difficulty of the stage varies depending on the chosen weather condition, with the stage being harder if the weather icon has an orange border around it. Sometimes, there are secret passages in some stages which the player can only reach by setting the weather to "hard". The trade-off for an easier level is that Zero cannot learn an EX Skill from a boss.

Cyber Elves, a core element of previous Mega Man Zero installments, are small helpers who can assist Zero in combat. Shortly after the introductory levels, a Cyber Elf will arrive for Zero to equip. This elf has most of the powers of Cyber Elves from previous games, which are unlocked as the player raises its level by feeding it E-Crystals. Zero may select one power from each of three categories: Nurse, Animal, and Hacker. The player's ranking at the end of a level is no longer given a penalty for using the Cyber Elves as long as they are kept under the maximum power limit. In addition to this, Zero can now equip body chips to enhance his abilities, including double-jumping and self-recovery, similar to early Mega Man X titles.

Zero cannot rely on finding secret disks to give him enhancements as in Mega Man Zero 3. Instead, players must collect parts dropped randomly from defeated enemies. Recipes for combining these parts can be obtained from NPCs the player rescues or a Cyber Elf after its stages of evolution. However, the majority of the recipes are found through experimentation with combinations of parts.

=== Mini-games and modes ===
Mega Man Zero 4 has multiple modes. Easy Mode and Normal Mode are available from the start. Easy Mode makes the game easier to play, but prevents changing the weather conditions or acquiring EX Skills.

After completing the game once on Normal Mode, players can access an additional Hard Mode or start a new game over the old one. There is also an Ultimate Mode, which can only be unlocked when certain criteria are met. Like the previous game, there are seven mini-games that can be unlocked once certain criteria are met.

They are as follows:

- Lumberjack – Beat the game with an overall S-Rank.
- Lava Surf – Beat the game with a complete database.
- Busy Basket – Beat the game once on Hard Mode.
- Slam Harvest – Beat the game in less than one hour.
- Plant Panic – Beat the game without feeding your Cyber Elf any E-Crystals.
- Elf Chase – Beat the game without using any recipes.
- Energy Lab – Surpass the high score on all the other mini-games.

== Plot ==
Several months after the destruction of Omega, Dr. Weil has assumed a dictatorial reign over Neo Arcadia, forcing many humans to flee. In response, Dr. Weil labels the escapees as Mavericks and begins to purge them as if they were Reploids.

A fleeing caravan led by a human journalist, Neige, is attacked by Dr. Weil's army. Zero, Ciel and a small band of Resistance fighters happen upon them and come to their aid. Neige explains they were en route to Area Zero, the crash site of the space colony Eurasia, which has become one of the last places on Earth that can support human life. Shortly after parting ways, Zero learns of a plot called "Operation Ragnarok", meant to destroy all environments outside of Neo Arcadia in order to force humans to return and live under Dr. Weil's rule. Helping Dr. Weil on his quest are a group of violent Reploids called the Einherjar Eight Warriors. They are led by a military Reploid named Craft, whose motivations are conflicted due to a romantic history with Neige. The Resistance locates the Einherjar Warriors at various environmentally destructive facilities near Area Zero, and Zero sets out to eliminate them.

After Zero defeats four of the Einherjar Warriors, Area Zero comes under attack from Neo Arcadia. Zero defends it and is forced to battle Craft. Neige breaks up the fight, but she is kidnapped by Craft, who escapes. Zero chases him to a prison where Neige is held and eventually rescues her.

After Zero eliminates the remaining Einherjar Warriors, Ciel intercepts a radio message from Dr. Weil, who reveals that Operation Ragnarok was a ruse. The "true" Ragnarok is an orbiting satellite cannon, which he has activated to wipe out Area Zero. Before Dr. Weil can use it, Craft takes control of the cannon and turns it on Neo Arcadia in an attempt to kill Dr. Weil. Zero teleports to the space station housing the cannon to stop Craft, but it fires before Zero can reach him, leaving Neo Arcadia in ruins. Zero defeats Craft, who succumbs to his wounds.

Ragnarok unexpectedly begins falling out of orbit on a path headed for Area Zero. Zero infiltrates the core of the station and finds Dr. Weil, who survived the destruction of Neo Arcadia. Dr. Weil reveals that, while he is human, his mind was transplanted into a constantly-regenerating mechanical body when he was previously exiled, rendering him effectively immortal. Believing he can survive the impact of the crash and personally oversee the destruction of Area Zero, Dr. Weil fuses himself with Ragnarok's power core and attacks Zero. Zero defeats him, causing significant damage to the station, but Weil survives and fuses with the station itself. Zero chooses to stay on Ragnarok as it plummets into Earth's atmosphere and defeats Weil again, destroying the station utterly and neutralizing the threat of its crash.

Ciel, the Resistance, and the refugee humans watch from Area Zero as falling pieces of Ragnarok burn up in the atmosphere, but Zero is nowhere to be found. Heartbroken, Ciel runs off alone and breaks down in tears, promising to carry on Zero's mission of maintaining peace between humans and Reploids. Zero's helmet, meanwhile, lies shattered in the desert among pieces of Ragnarok's wreckage.

== Development ==
Capcom Japan's announcement of a sequel to Mega Man Zero 3 was anticipated, following the pattern of development news from the previous two Mega Man Zero games. Capcom updated its official site quietly with information stating that the game would have an April 2005 release in Japan.

== Reception ==
Reception

Aggregate scores
| Aggregator | Score |
|---|---|
| GameRankings | 77% |
| Metacritic | 77/100 |

Review scores
| Publication | Score |
|---|---|
| Famitsu | 30/40 |
| G4 | 3/5 |
| Game Informer | 8/10 |
| GameSpot | 7.6/10 |
| GameSpy | 4/5 |
| IGN | 7.5/10 |
| Nintendo Power | 8.5/10 |

Mega Man Zero 4 has an average of 77% on Metacritic and GameRankings, making it roughly the 92nd best-ranking Game Boy Advance title. Mega Man Zero 4 entered Japanese sales charts at number eight during its release week. According to Media Create sales information, Mega Man Zero 4 was the 177th best-selling video game in Japan in 2005 at approximately 74,354 copies.

Mega Man Zero 4 has been called a "refined version of an outstanding platformer series" with a more streamlined weapon and Cyber Elf system. Critics were quick to state that it hadn't changed much and that it was "more of the same". One reviewer, however, stated that the level designs were "slightly less challenging" than those of previous installations, but more inventive.

The simplified Cyber Elf system received mixed reviews. GameSpot thought the new single Cyber Elf was an improvement, while Jeremy Parish of 1UP.com stated that it signalled a return "to the old-fashion Mega Man game structure", which he found "unfortunate since the Zero games' greatest strength was their willingness to break the trite and true Mega Man mold".

Critics were mostly neutral about the weather system, saying that diehard players wouldn't make use of the system. It was seen as a nice idea, but the effects weren't "pronounced enough to make most levels worth playing through twice".
