= Mega Man Zero =

- Genres: Platform; Hack and slash
- Developer: Inti Creates
- Publisher: Capcom
- Platforms: Game Boy Advance; Nintendo DS; Wii U; PlayStation 4; Xbox One; Nintendo Switch; PC
- First release: Mega Man Zero; April 26, 2002
- Latest release: Mega Man Zero/ZX Legacy Collection; February 25, 2020
- Parent series: Mega Man

Mega Man Zero (Note: Japanese: ロックマンゼロ, Hepburn: Rokkuman Zero; lit. 'Rockman Zero') is a hack and slash platform game series in Capcom's Mega Man video game franchise. It was developed by Inti Creates, with Co-Producer Keiji Inafune and Director Yoshinori Kawano. The series consists of four games that were first released on the Game Boy Advance and later on the Nintendo DS and the Virtual Console (Wii U).

The story takes place more than 100 years after the Mega Man X storyline and follows the re-awakened Zero, who is fighting in a war between humans and Reploids, self-aware, human-like robots who are oppressed and hunted down by mankind due to a worldwide energy shortage crisis. Together with the human scientist Ciel, Zero helps the Reploid resistance survive and fights against other Reploids sent by mankind to destroy them. However, this is only the setup for the story and events change drastically throughout the series.

== Gameplay ==
Similar to the Mega Man X series, the Mega Man Zero series is a two-dimensional action platform game with run and gun elements that places a heavy emphasis on memorizing boss patterns and selecting the correct weapons to use against enemies.

Unlike the previous series, the stages of Mega Man Zero are inside of areas that are part of a larger map, and the player can freely explore these areas once the respective mission(s) in each area is completed. However, Mega Man Zero 2 and later entries removed this and returned to the traditional Mega Man format that allowed the player to select a mission from a stage select screen.

The game mechanics slightly change with every entry of the series. Zero is given a variety of weapons to use and can level them up to unlock new abilities, although this was removed from Mega Man Zero 3 and onward as the abilities become accessible from the start of the game.

A new entry in the series was the Score and Level System, which gives the player a score out of 100 and its corresponding level (Note: which range from S to A, B, C, D, E, and F, from highest to lowest) depending on how well they performed on each mission. The series also introduces the Cyber-Elf system, which allows Zero to equip small helper beings known as "Cyber Elves" to assist him in combat. After feeding them with a certain amount of E-Crystals that are dropped by enemies, the elves can either provide permanent enhancements—such as increasing Zero's maximum health capacity, or grant temporary benefits—such as the ability to deflect bullets for a short time. However, the score at the end of each mission will decrease for every Cyber-Elf used.

Finally, Zero's weapons receive elemental enhancements in every game except Mega Man Zero 4. Acting like a rock-paper-scissors system, Zero gains three element chips (Fire, Ice, Thunder) that can be attached to all his weapons and changed freely. Doing so adds elemental effects to his charge attacks and inflict higher damage to bosses weak to the selected element, or no damage if they are immune to it.

== Plot ==
=== Mega Man Zero ===
Centuries after disappearing at the end of the Mega Man X series, Zero is found and awakened by Ciel, a 12-year old human scientist. Zero, unsure of who he is due to temporary memory loss, protects Ciel and her band of Reploids from a group sent out to destroy them. During the events of the game, as Zero fights off several attempts to destroy the remaining Reploids, it is unveiled what happened during his 100-year absence: After the Maverick War that took place during the Mega Man X series — where humans were being purged by malevolent Reploids, known as Mavericks — drew to a close with the Mavericks suffering total defeat, humans and Reploids were able to live in harmony in a utopian state known as Neo Arcadia. Unfortunately, this peace was short-lived due to the energy shortage crisis which led to the murdering of countless innocent Reploids to reduce energy consumption. Ciel thus banded with the Reploids and founded the Resistance. It is also revealed that a copy of X — Zero's former ally and best friend — is the leader of Neo Arcadia and the mastermind behind the Reploid genocide. After defeating the Four Guardians — Copy X's right-hand generals — Zero eventually confronts Copy X and defeats him in battle. While dying, Copy X self-destructs and Zero barely manages to escape. He then finds himself in an endless desert, surrounded by Neo Arcadian troops. Knowing that Neo Arcadia will focus their attention on him, Zero decides to stay in the desert and fight endlessly in hopes of giving Ciel and the resistance the time needed to escape.

=== Mega Man Zero 2 ===
Set one year after the events of the first game, it is revealed that Zero has been hunting down Neo Arcadian forces in the desert. After defeating yet another group of Neo Arcadian forces, Zero finally collapses due to exhaustion. However, because of unknown reasons, he is rescued by Harpuia, one of Four Guardians and now leader of Neo Arcadia. Although they are enemies, Harpuia brings Zero to a location near the Resistance Base, where he is eventually found by the Resistance members and repaired by Cerveau.

While Ciel tries to develop a new energy source to end the war, the new leader of the Resistance, Elpizo, instead prepares for a head-on invasion on Neo Arcadia. The invasion results in total failure, with Elpizo being the only survivor. Frustrated by his powerlessness, he leaves the Resistance to search for the Dark Elf, a powerful, malevolent Cyber-Elf that brought unparalleled destruction to Earth during the Elf Wars - an event that happened during Zero's 100-year absence.

Elpizo eventually revives the Dark Elf by finding and destroying the original Mega Man X's physical body, which acted as a seal to keep the Dark Elf contained. Elpizo absorbs the Dark Elf to obtain a colossal amount of power but is narrowly defeated by Zero. The game ends with the Dark Elf escaping and the original X — now a Cyber-Elf — telling Zero that the Dark Elf was once known as the Mother Elf, whose original purpose was to cure the Maverick Virus — which turned Reploids into Mavericks — in order to end the Maverick War during the Mega Man X series.

=== Mega Man Zero 3 ===
Two months have passed since Elpizo's defeat, with the Dark Elf's location still unknown. During this time, Ciel has finished her research on a new energy supply that allowed virtually unlimited energy generation, which was dubbed the "Ciel System". While en route to Neo Arcadia to propose the Ciel System in hopes of making peace as there would no longer be a reason to continue the genocide on the Reploids, a large spaceship with the Dark Elf's energy reading crashes to Earth. Zero is sent out to investigate and find out more about the energy reading, but instead, finds the remaining three Four Guardians fighting against a gigantic Reploid named Omega and encounters an accompanying scientist named Dr. Weil — both who were banished to space for life due to their crimes in instigating the Elf Wars by corrupting the Mother Elf into the Dark Elf. Dr Weil then reveals that he had resurrected Copy X, who then resumes his reign in Neo Arcadia and forces the Four Guardians to submit to Dr Weil's will and subsequently demotes them. The Four Guardians, suspecting that Copy X is being heavily influenced by Weil, leave the Neo Arcadian army. The Dark Elf soon reappears in a human residential district in Neo Arcadia. Wishing to capture it, Dr. Weil and Copy X authorise a missile to be launched at the district to incapacitate the Dark Elf. Although successful in capturing the Dark Elf, the missile attack causes thousands of innocent human casualties. Following this nefarious event, Ciel rescinds her offer to propose the Ciel System, leading Dr. Weil and Copy X to brand the Resistance as Mavericks and subsequently launch an all-out invasion against the Resistance. The Resistance is able to delay the invasion until Zero reaches Copy X and kills him once more, thus making the invasion lose steam. However, Dr. Weil then succeeds Copy X as the new ruler of Neo Arcadia and announces his true intention for capturing the Dark Elf, which is to fuse the Dark Elf with Omega and link them with a colossal frequency transmitter that would enable Omega to control the minds of every Reploid on Earth. Dr. Weil justifies this as vengeance against both humanity and Reploids for his exile in space. Zero eventually confronts and kills Omega in two different forms, but Omega then reveals his true form — a body that looks exactly like Zero. Weil appears in the background and reveals that while Zero was powered down during his hibernation, Zero's conscience and memories were transferred to a copy body. Zero's original body was stolen by Weil to be used by Omega due to its unmatched fighting abilities. Despite the revelation of this fact, Zero, with assistance from the Four Guardians, destroys his original body and kills Omega for good. Omega's death results in a large explosion, which releases the Dark Elf from Omega and frees it from Weil's corruption. X tells the truth about Zero and his body to the Resistance before disappearing forever. The Dark Elf, now known as the Mother Elf once more, brings Zero back to the Resistance Base, before it too disappears, ending the game.

=== Mega Man Zero 4 ===
Despite Omega being destroyed, Weil continued his revenge on humans and Reploids alike and assumed a dictatorial reign over Neo Arcadia and stripped much of its citizens' rights, leading many humans to flee and start their own settlements. In response, Weil labelled the escapees as Mavericks and began to purge them just like the Reploids.

The game starts with Zero, Ciel, and the Resistance members encountering a group of humans fleeing from Weil's forces. Zero protects the humans, who then reveal to the Resistance that they are headed towards a large, nature-filled settlement in Area Zero, the location where the Eurasia colony crashed during the events of Mega Man X5 more than 100 years ago.

The large population of settlements like Area Zero attracts Weil's attention, who reveals a plan to use a meteor-sized space cannon called Ragnarok to vaporize all nature and make Neo Arcadia the only habitable location on Earth, which would force people to stay under his tyrannical rule. Zero eventually makes his way towards Ragnarok and defeats Weil, but not before Weil programs Ragnarok to crash into Area Zero in an attempt to cause immense destruction on Earth.

Knowing that there was only one option to save the Earth, Zero rejects Ciel's plea to transfer out of Ragnarok and back to the Resistance Base and sacrifices his life to destroy Ragnarok's core before it crashes to Earth. Ciel, watching the pieces of Ragnarok fall to Earth, promises to recreate the Earth as a better place where there will once again be peace between Reploids and humans. The series ends with an image of Zero's shattered helmet on the ground along with Ragnarok's debris.

== Content editing ==
The robot at the beginning of Mega Man Zero firing at resistance fighters, causing them to spurt blood in the Japanese version (left); other instances of blood would often be edited out of international releases (right) of each game.

In the Japanese versions of all four games, characters that were wounded would often spurt blood, or blood-like oil. Much of this was removed in international versions to maintain a child-friendly rating. These changes were not done to the Japanese versions of the games included within the Zero/ZX Legacy Collection.

The English version of the Mega Man Zero series has also edited some instances of words such as "die" or "death," replacing them with terms such as "perish," "destroy," or "retire".

== Reception ==
When the first game in the series came out, reviewers were quick to hail a return to what they considered "the Mega Man roots"; however, some fans criticized that the lack of knowing which boss the player will face next was a change for the worse and that it "takes away what made the series unique in the past".

Mega Man Zero games have earned generally positive reviews. Review sources both criticized and praised the high difficulty level of the game and remarked that they were similar in nature to earlier installments in the Mega Man series. Positive reviews noted the variety of abilities and customization along with an engaging story than compared to its prequel series, while negative reviews focused on the series repetitiveness and lack of originality. Review scores were lower for the last two titles in the series, with critics pointing out that the games were just using the same gameplay without introducing anything new.

== Re-releases ==
Capcom bundled all four Mega Man Zero games in a single release for the Nintendo DS titled Mega Man Zero Collection (Rockman Zero Collection in Japan). The game was released in North America on June 8, 2010, two days later in Japan and Australia, and was slated for release in Europe on 11 June 2010, however, in the European region, release of the game has been inconsistent, with it not being released in some nations. No changes were made to the games in comparison with the original versions, but a few new features were added to the compilation, like an artwork gallery and the ability to remap certain actions to different buttons, as well as an "Easy Scenario" mode that allow the four games to be played as if they were a single one, with some alterations to make the games easier (e.g. blocks covering spikes, no need to feed Elves, all Cyber Elf powers automatically activated, etc.).

A new collection, known as Mega Man Zero/ZX Legacy Collection (Rockman Zero & ZX Double Hero Collection in Japan), was released on the PlayStation 4, Xbox One, PC (Steam), and Nintendo Switch in February 2020. This contains all four Zero video games along with Mega Man ZX and Mega Man ZX Advent. Much like with Mega Man Zero Collection and just like the previous Legacy Collection releases, this one contains bonus content and a new gameplay mode known as Z Chaser, a time-trial based mini-game. It was originally set for release on January 21, 2020 (worldwide) and January 23, 2020 (in Japan), but was delayed until February 25, 2020, and February 27, 2020, respectively. Like with Mega Man X Legacy Collection and Mega Man X Legacy Collection 2, the game's rating is T for Teen unlike the original releases which were rated E for Everyone, or E10+ in the case of Mega Man ZX Advent due to the inclusion of the uncensored Japanese versions.

== Manga and graphic novel ==
A comedy manga based on the games was authored by Hideto Kajima and serialised in CoroCoro Comic from June 2003 to February 2006.

On 2025, Udon Entertainment released Mega Man Zero Timelines, featuring Reploid Zero in a post-apocalyptic setting, exploring a new era through a one-shot format.
