= Mega Man Zero 3 =

2004 video game

- North American cover art
- Developer: Inti Creates
- Publisher: Capcom
- Directors: Ryota Ito; Yoshinori Kawano
- Producers: Takuya Aizu; Keiji Inafune
- Designer: Yoshihisa Tsuda
- Programmers: Kazutaka Yanagisawa; Akihiro Shishido; Gen Kamada
- Artist: Toru Nakayama
- Composers: Ippo Yamada; Masaki Suzuki; Tsutomu Kurihara; Luna Umegaki
- Series: Mega Man Zero
- Platform: Game Boy Advance
- Release: JP: April 23, 2004; NA: October 5, 2004; EU: September 3, 2004; AU: November 25, 2004
- Genres: Platform, hack and slash
- Mode: Single-player

Mega Man Zero 3 (Note: Known in Japan as Rockman Zero 3 (Japanese: ロックマンゼロ3,, Hepburn: Rokkuman Zero Surī)) is a 2004 hack and slash platform game developed by Inti Creates and published by Capcom for the Game Boy Advance (GBA) handheld game console. It is the third video game in the Mega Man Zero series of Mega Man video games. The European version featured a completely different logo, which was also used on various other Mega Man titles.

The game takes place two months after the events of Mega Man Zero 2 and follows series protagonist Zero as he attempts to stop a new villain, Dr. Weil, from wreaking havoc on Neo Arcadia.

Mega Man Zero 3 received positive reviews from critics, with praise for its combat, level design, and story, although some criticized its similarities to previous titles. In February 2020, the game was released on the PlayStation 4, Xbox One, Nintendo Switch, and PC via Steam as part of the Mega Man Zero/ZX Legacy Collection.

== Plot ==
Two months following Zero's victory over Elpizo, the Dark Elf remains at large. During this time, Ciel has finished her research on a new energy supply to end the crisis, dubbed the "Ciel System". While en route to Neo Arcadia to propose the Ciel System in hopes of ending the conflict and the genocide of Reploids, a spaceship with the Dark Elf's energy reading crashes to Earth.

Zero sets out to investigate, but instead finds the remaining Guardians (Harpuia, Fefnir, and Leviathan) fighting against a gigantic Reploid named Omega and a scientist named Dr. Weil — both who were banished to space due to their crimes in instigating the Elf Wars and turning the Mother Elf into the Dark Elf a century prior. Dr. Weil reveals he has resurrected Copy X, who resumes his rule over Neo Arcadia, much to Harpuia's chagrin. The Guardians, suspecting that Copy X is being heavily influenced by Dr. Weil, defect from Neo Arcadia. Zero and Dr. Weil go their separate ways in search of the Dark Elf.

The Dark Elf appears in a human residential district in Neo Arcadia, leading Dr. Weil and Copy X to launch a missile in order to incapacitate it. Although successful in capturing the Dark Elf, the incident kills thousands of humans. Following this event, Ciel rescinds her offer of the Ciel System, leading Dr. Weil and Copy X to brand the Resistance as Mavericks and subsequently launch an invasion against them. The Resistance is able to delay the invasion until Zero locates Copy X. During the ensuing battle, Copy X is betrayed and killed by Dr. Weil, who declares himself the new ruler of Neo Arcadia and announces his true intention for capturing the Dark Elf: to fuse it with Omega and link them with a frequency transmitter that would enable Omega to control the minds of every Reploid on Earth.

Zero confronts and defeats Omega, who reveals his true form: a body that looks exactly like Zero. Dr. Weil reveals that while Zero was powered down during his hibernation, Zero's conscience and memories were transferred to a copy body; Zero's original body was then stolen by Weil to be used by Omega due to its unmatched fighting abilities. Despite this revelation, Zero and the Guardians destroy his original body, killing Omega for good. Omega's death results in a massive explosion, which frees the Dark Elf from Dr. Weil's corruption.

While Zero is unconscious, X appears and tells Zero that it's up to him to protect the Earth and defeat Dr. Weil. Finally out of power, X vanishes forever. The Dark Elf, known as the Mother Elf once more, delivers Zero to the Resistance Base before flying away.

== Gameplay ==
This game follows almost exactly the same rules as its predecessor, Mega Man Zero 2. Once again, Zero has his Z-Saber, Buster, and Shield Boomerang. However, Zero's rod weapon (originally the Triple Rod in Mega Man Zero and the Chain Rod in Mega Man Zero 2) has been replaced with the Recoil Rod: a pair of tonfa-like weapons that can be aimed in all directions. When charged up, a powerful stabbing attack is performed, which can knock enemies back, or propel Zero into the air if aimed down to the ground, like a makeshift pogo stick.

The Cyber Elf system has been given an overhaul with the introduction of Satellite Cyber Elves. These are different from the standard Cyber Elves, which have been renamed "Fusion Elves", in that they are equipped for a constant benefit, and the use of them will not affect the mission ranking score. However, only two Satellite Elves can be equipped at once.

Cyberspace is a new addition to the game. It is said by one Resistance Member (Hirondelle) that the portal to Cyberspace opened up due to Omega's arrival. Going through the door to Cyberspace leads the player into an area that looks exactly like the one in which they left but with a green tinge to it. Enemy appearances are less frequent and if a transfer of info from a Mega Man Battle Network 4/Mega Man Zero 3 link has been performed, certain virus enemies from the Battle Network Series will appear. All enemies drop health items (instead of other items, such as Secret Disks) in Cyberspace. Entering the Cyberspace causes certain Cyber Elves (both Fusion and Satellite, the ones with the A-mark on the lower left) to auto-activate without dying, even if not grown enough to be normally used, and these Elves do not affect the score. However, going into Cyberspace decreases the mission ranking score, making it more difficult to obtain an S or A Rank, which is needed in order to win EX Skills of the end-of-stage bosses. Zero no longer needs to "level up" in order to create weapon combos as they are already in place.

=== Secret Disks ===
Throughout the game, enemies may drop Secret Disks, which may contain information about the Mega Man Zero series, enemy information, Cyber Elves, energy capsules, energy crystals or even customization chips.

Most of the disks can be opened by Zero himself, mostly those containing Cyber Elves, but the others are locked and the player will have to take them to Cerveau in order to open them. Once opened, their info will be stored in a Secret Disk library featured within the game.

=== Customization Chips ===
The Forms system from Mega Man Zero 2 has been replaced with Customization Chips. These can be found in Secret Disks and come in three types—head, body and legs. Only one of each type of chip can be equipped at a time, which gives the player more flexibility in customizing Zero.

These Chips give direct upgrades to Zero's head, body or legs, and can be used to reproduce the effects of the various Forms that Zero could take in Mega Man Zero 2. As with the Forms in this game's predecessor, Zero can take on different colours when different body chips are equipped.

=== Extras ===
As with other Mega Man Zero games, beating the game will allow playing the completed save file again in a "New Game+". Zero will start with all Fusion Elves used from the previous game still in effect (although he will still be penalized for their use), and will also get to keep any EX Skills and body chips that he earned in the previous game.

Hard Mode can be unlocked after completing the game once. It can be accessed by pressing the L shoulder button before pressing Start while selecting a New Game. In Hard Mode, Cyber Elves cannot be used and Cyberspace cannot be accessed (save for one specific level). Zero's triple-slash and full-charge shot are also disabled, and he cannot earn EX Skills.

Ultimate mode can be unlocked by collecting all of the Secret Disks in one game and beating it. Hold R when starting a New Game to play. In Ultimate Mode, Zero starts with all Fusion Elves with permanent effects (such as the Elves that extend the life meter) already in use and without penalty in mission scores. Zero will also have a few body parts available from the start, including the Ultima Foot chip. Finally, Zero can use full-charge attacks instantly by means of simplistic button combos.

There are also seven mini games that can be selected from on the game's Start Menu. They are all unlocked after certain criteria have been met:

- Zero mini-game – Beat the game once.
- Copy X mini-game – Beat the game on Hard Mode.
- Ciel mini-game – Beat the game with an overall S-rank at the final stage.
- Fefnir mini-game – Beat the game with an average of 100 points at the final stage.
- Leviathan mini-game – Beat the game with an average of 100 points at the final stage.
- Phantom mini-game – Beat the game without attacking with any weapons other than the Buster Shot (you can still use them, just don't hit any enemies with them; e.g. You can still use Recoil Rod for pushing blocks or the jump boost, for example), and with an overall S-Rank.
- Harpuia mini-game – Beat the game without attacking with any weapons other than the Z-Saber (you can still use them, just don't hit any enemies with them; e.g. You can still use Recoil Rod for pushing blocks or the jump boost, for example), and with an overall S-Rank.

In addition, the Japanese version also uses the Nintendo e-Reader system to unlock gameplay features which are adjustments by scanning the cards to unlock visual changes in the Resistance Base or minor power-ups. In the later Zero Collection and Zero/ZX Legacy Collection this has been changed to an unlockable feature that each require different aspects of the collections to be completed, which also allowed this feature to become available outside of Japan.

== Reception ==
Reception

Aggregate scores
Aggregator	Score
GameRankings	78%
Metacritic	77/100

Review scores
Publication	Score
1Up.com	B+
Famitsu	28/40
Game Informer	6.8/10
GameSpot	8.3/10
GameSpy	4/5
IGN	8/10
Play	8.3/10

Mega Man Zero 3 was the fourth best-selling video game in Japan during its week of release. It was the 106th best-selling game in the country for 2004 at 121,847 units sold. The game would later become one of the cheapest game of the Mega Man Zero subseries to repurchase.

A common comment made by reviews of the game is that Mega Man Zero 3 is similar to its predecessors and has not changed much in terms of gameplay. Reviewers complain often about the difficulty level of this game's predecessors and were quick to praise the game's difficulty level for being more forgiving but still challenging.

For instance, GameSpot said the game "could be considered the best of the GBA Mega Man games", enjoying Zero's increased arsenal and more forgiving gameplay. Game Informer critiqued that "this game is too much of the same, and virtually inaccessible to anyone who doesn't want to memorize every inch of it"
