= List of Capcom games: M =

This is a list of video games by Capcom organized alphabetically by name. The list may also include ports that were developed and published by others companies under license from Capcom.

Title	System	Release date	Developer(s)	JP	NA	EU	AUS	Ref(s)
Magic Sword	Arcade	July 23, 1990	Capcom	Yes	Yes	Yes		
Magic Sword	Super Nintendo Entertainment System	May 29, 1992	Minakuchi Engineering	Yes	Yes	Yes		
Magic Sword	Xbox Live Arcade	April 14, 2010	Capcom	Yes	Yes	Yes	Yes	
Magic Sword	PlayStation Network	April 15, 2010	Capcom	Yes	Yes	Yes	Yes	
Magical Tetris Challenge	Arcade	1998	Capcom	Yes				
Magical Tetris Challenge	Nintendo 64	November 20, 1998	Capcom	Yes	Yes	Yes		
Magical Tetris Challenge	PlayStation	March 18, 1999	Capcom	Yes		Yes		
Magical Tetris Challenge	Game Boy Color	November 12, 1999	Capcom	Yes	Yes	Yes		
Mahjong Gakuen	Arcade	1988	Capcom	Yes				
Makaimura for WonderSwan	WonderSwan	July 22, 1999	Capcom	Yes				
Mars Matrix: Hyper Solid Shooting	Arcade	April 2000	Takumi Corporation	Yes	Yes			
Mars Matrix: Hyper Solid Shooting	Dreamcast	November 9, 2000	Takumi Corporation	Yes	Yes			
Marusa no Onna	Nintendo Entertainment System	September 19, 1989	Capcom	Yes				
Marvel Super Heroes	Arcade	October 24, 1995	Capcom	Yes	Yes			
Marvel Super Heroes	Sega Saturn	August 8, 1997	Capcom	Yes	Yes	Yes		
Marvel Super Heroes	PlayStation	September 25, 1997	Capcom	Yes	Yes	Yes		
Marvel Super Heroes	PlayStation Network	September 26, 2012	Capcom	Yes	Yes	Yes	Yes	
Marvel Super Heroes	Xbox Live Arcade	September 26, 2012	Capcom	Yes	Yes	Yes	Yes	
Marvel Super Heroes vs. Street Fighter	Arcade	July 1997	Capcom	Yes	Yes			
Marvel Super Heroes vs. Street Fighter	Sega Saturn	October 22, 1998	Capcom	Yes				
Marvel Super Heroes vs. Street Fighter EX Edition	PlayStation	February 23, 1999	Capcom	Yes	Yes	Yes		
Marvel Super Heroes In War of the Gems	Super Nintendo Entertainment System	October 18, 1996	Capcom	Yes	Yes	Yes		
Marvel vs. Capcom	Dreamcast	March 25, 1999	Capcom	Yes	Yes	Yes		
Marvel vs. Capcom 2	Dreamcast	March 30, 2000	Capcom	Yes	Yes	Yes		
Marvel vs. Capcom 2	iOS	April 25, 2012	Capcom	Yes	Yes	Yes	Yes	
Marvel vs. Capcom 2	PlayStation 2	September 19, 2002	Capcom	Yes	Yes	Yes		
Marvel vs. Capcom 2	PlayStation Network	August 13, 2009	Capcom	Yes	Yes	Yes	Yes	
Marvel vs. Capcom 2	Xbox	September 19, 2002	Capcom	Yes	Yes			
Marvel vs. Capcom 2	Xbox Live Marketplace	July 29, 2009	Capcom	Yes	Yes	Yes	Yes	
Marvel vs. Capcom 2: New Age of Heroes	Arcade	2000	Capcom	Yes	Yes	Yes	Yes	
Marvel vs. Capcom 3: Fate of Two Worlds	PlayStation 3	February 15, 2011	Capcom/Eighting	Yes	Yes	Yes		
Marvel vs. Capcom 3: Fate of Two Worlds	Xbox 360	February 15, 2011	Capcom/Eighting	Yes	Yes	Yes		
Marvel vs. Capcom: Clash of Super Heroes	Arcade	January 23, 1998	Capcom	Yes	Yes			
Marvel vs. Capcom: Clash of Super Heroes	Dreamcast	March 25, 1999	Capcom	Yes	Yes	Yes		
Marvel vs. Capcom Clash of Super Heroes EX Edition	PlayStation	November 11, 1999	Capcom	Yes	Yes	Yes		
Marvel vs. Capcom: Infinite	PlayStation 4	September 19, 2017	Capcom	Yes	Yes	Yes		
Marvel vs. Capcom: Infinite	Microsoft Windows	September 19, 2017	Capcom	Yes	Yes	Yes		
Marvel vs. Capcom: Infinite	Xbox One	September 19, 2017	Capcom	Yes	Yes	Yes		
Marvel vs. Capcom Origins	PlayStation Network	September 25, 2012	Capcom	Yes	Yes	Yes	Yes	
Marvel vs. Capcom Origins	Xbox Live Arcade	September 26, 2012	Capcom	Yes	Yes	Yes	Yes	
Maximo vs. Army of Zin	PlayStation 2	September 18, 2003	Capcom	Yes	Yes	Yes	Yes	
Maximo vs. Army of Zin	PlayStation Network	February 15, 2012	Capcom			Yes		
Maximo: Ghosts to Glory	PlayStation 2	December 27, 2001	Capcom	Yes	Yes	Yes	Yes	
Maximo: Ghosts to Glory	PlayStation Network	October 4, 2011	Capcom		Yes	Yes	Yes	
MaXplosion	iOS	2011	Capcom		Yes	Yes	Yes	
Mega Man	Nintendo Entertainment System	December 17, 1987	Capcom	Yes	Yes	Yes		
Mega Man	PlayStation	August 5, 1999	Capcom	Yes				
Mega Man	Android	January 5, 2017	Capcom	Yes	Yes			
Mega Man & Bass	Super Nintendo Entertainment System	April 24, 1998	Capcom	Yes				
Mega Man & Bass	Game Boy Advance	August 10, 2002	Capcom	Yes	Yes	Yes	Yes	
Mega Man 2	Nintendo Entertainment System	December 24, 1988	Capcom	Yes	Yes	Yes		
Mega Man 2	PlayStation	September 2, 1999	Capcom	Yes				
Mega Man 2	iOS	March 26, 2009	Capcom		Yes			
Mega Man 2: The Power Fighters	Arcade	July 9, 1996	Capcom	Yes	Yes	Yes	Yes	
Mega Man 3	Nintendo Entertainment System	September 28, 1990	Capcom	Yes	Yes	Yes		
Mega Man 3	PlayStation	September 14, 1999	Capcom	Yes				
Mega Man 4	Nintendo Entertainment System	December 6, 1991	Capcom	Yes	Yes	Yes		
Mega Man 4	PlayStation	October 28, 1999	Capcom	Yes				
Mega Man 5	Nintendo Entertainment System	December 4, 1992	Capcom	Yes	Yes	Yes		
Mega Man 5	PlayStation	November 25, 1999	Capcom	Yes				
Mega Man 6	Nintendo Entertainment System	November 5, 1993	Capcom	Yes	Yes			
Mega Man 6	PlayStation	December 9, 1999	Capcom	Yes				
Mega Man 64	Nintendo 64	November 22, 2000	Capcom	Yes	Yes			
Mega Man 7	Super Nintendo Entertainment System	March 24, 1995	Capcom	Yes	Yes	Yes		
Mega Man 8	PlayStation	December 17, 1996	Capcom	Yes	Yes	Yes	Yes	
Mega Man 8	Sega Saturn	January 17, 1997	Capcom	Yes	Yes			
Mega Man 9	WiiWare	September 22, 2008	Inti Creates/Capcom	Yes	Yes	Yes	Yes	
Mega Man 9	PlayStation Network	September 25, 2008	Inti Creates/Capcom	Yes	Yes	Yes	Yes	
Mega Man 9	Xbox Live Marketplace	October 1, 2008	Inti Creates/Capcom	Yes	Yes	Yes	Yes	
Mega Man 10	WiiWare	March 1, 2010	Inti Creates/Capcom	Yes	Yes	Yes	Yes	
Mega Man 10	PlayStation Network	March 9, 2010	Inti Creates/Capcom	Yes	Yes	Yes		
Mega Man 10	Xbox Live Marketplace	March 31, 2010	Inti Creates/Capcom	Yes	Yes	Yes	Yes	
Mega Man 11	Microsoft Windows	October 2, 2018	Capcom	Yes	Yes	Yes	Yes	
Mega Man 11	Nintendo Switch	October 2, 2018	Capcom	Yes	Yes	Yes	Yes	
Mega Man 11	PlayStation 4	October 2, 2018	Capcom	Yes	Yes	Yes	Yes	
Mega Man 11	Xbox One	October 2, 2018	Capcom	Yes	Yes	Yes	Yes	
Mega Man Anniversary Collection	GameCube	June 23, 2004	Atomic Planet Entertainment		Yes			
Mega Man Anniversary Collection	PlayStation 2	June 23, 2004	Atomic Planet Entertainment		Yes			
Mega Man Anniversary Collection	Xbox	March 15, 2005	Atomic Planet Entertainment		Yes			
Mega Man Battle & Chase	PlayStation	March 20, 1997	Capcom	Yes	Yes	Yes	Yes	
Mega Man Battle Chip Challenge	Game Boy Advance	August 8, 2003	Inti Creates/Capcom	Yes	Yes	Yes		
Mega Man Battle Network	Game Boy Advance	March 21, 2001	Capcom	Yes	Yes	Yes		
Mega Man Battle Network 2	Game Boy Advance	December 14, 2001	Capcom	Yes	Yes	Yes	Yes	
Mega Man Battle Network 3	Game Boy Advance	December 6, 2002	Capcom	Yes	Yes	Yes	Yes	
Mega Man Battle Network 4	Game Boy Advance	December 14, 2003	Capcom	Yes	Yes	Yes	Yes	
Mega Man Battle Network 5	Game Boy Advance	December 9, 2004	Capcom	Yes	Yes	Yes		
Mega Man Battle Network 5	Nintendo DS	July 21, 2005	Capcom	Yes	Yes	Yes	Yes	
Mega Man Battle Network 6	Game Boy Advance	November 23, 2005	Capcom	Yes	Yes	Yes		
Mega Man: Dr. Wily's Revenge	Game Boy	July 26, 1991	Minakuchi Engineering	Yes	Yes	Yes		
Mega Man II	Game Boy	December 20, 1991	Japan System House	Yes	Yes	Yes		
Mega Man III	Game Boy	December 11, 1992	Minakuchi Engineering	Yes	Yes	Yes		
Mega Man IV	Game Boy	October 29, 1993	Minakuchi Engineering	Yes	Yes	Yes		
Mega Man Legends	PlayStation	December 18, 1997	Capcom	Yes	Yes	Yes		
Mega Man Legends	Microsoft Windows	February 23, 2001	Capcom	Yes	Yes			
Mega Man Legends	PlayStation Portable	August 4, 2005	Capcom	Yes				
Mega Man Legends 2	PlayStation	April 20, 2000	Capcom	Yes	Yes	Yes		
Mega Man Legends 2	Microsoft Windows	September 8, 2005	Capcom	Yes	Yes			
Mega Man Legends 2	PlayStation Portable	May 30, 2003	Capcom	Yes				
Mega Man Legends 3	Nintendo 3DS	Cancelled	Capcom					
Mega Man Mania	Game Boy Advance	Cancelled	Capcom					
Mega Man Network Transmission	GameCube	March 6, 2003	Arika	Yes	Yes	Yes		
Mega Man Powered Up	PlayStation Portable	March 2, 2006	Capcom	Yes	Yes	Yes		
Mega Man Powered Up	PlayStation Network	December 16, 2009	Capcom	Yes				
Mega Man Soccer	Super Nintendo Entertainment System	February 17, 1994	Sun L	Yes	Yes			
Mega Man Star Force	Nintendo DS	December 14, 2006	Capcom	Yes	Yes	Yes	Yes	
Mega Man Star Force 2	Nintendo DS	November 22, 2007	Capcom	Yes	Yes	Yes	Yes	
Mega Man Star Force 3	Nintendo DS	November 13, 2008	Capcom	Yes	Yes			
Mega Man Universe	PlayStation Network	Cancelled	Capcom					
Mega Man Universe	Xbox Live Marketplace	Cancelled	Capcom					
Mega Man V	Game Boy	July 22, 1994	Minakuchi Engineering	Yes	Yes	Yes		
Mega Man X	Super Nintendo Entertainment System	December 17, 1993	Capcom	Yes	Yes	Yes		
Mega Man X	DOS	March 10, 1995	Rozner Labs	Yes	Yes			
Mega Man X	Virtual Console	2011	Capcom	Yes	Yes	Yes	Yes	
Mega Man X	Android	November 18, 2011	Capcom	Yes				
Mega Man X	iOS	December 21, 2011	Capcom	Yes	Yes	Yes	Yes	
Mega Man X Collection	GameCube	January 10, 2006	Capcom		Yes			
Mega Man X Collection	PlayStation 2	January 10, 2006	Capcom		Yes			
Mega Man X: Command Mission	GameCube	July 29, 2004	Capcom	Yes	Yes	Yes		
Mega Man X: Command Mission	PlayStation 2	July 29, 2004	Capcom	Yes	Yes	Yes		
Mega Man X Legacy Collection	Microsoft Windows	July 24, 2018	Capcom	Yes	Yes	Yes	Yes	
Mega Man X Legacy Collection	Nintendo Switch	July 24, 2018	Capcom	Yes	Yes	Yes	Yes	
Mega Man X Legacy Collection	PlayStation 4	July 24, 2018	Capcom	Yes	Yes	Yes	Yes	
Mega Man X Legacy Collection	Xbox One	July 24, 2018	Capcom	Yes	Yes	Yes	Yes	
Mega Man X Legacy Collection 2	Microsoft Windows	July 24, 2018	Capcom	Yes	Yes	Yes	Yes	
Mega Man X Legacy Collection 2	Nintendo Switch	July 24, 2018	Capcom	Yes	Yes	Yes	Yes	
Mega Man X Legacy Collection 2	PlayStation 4	July 24, 2018	Capcom	Yes	Yes	Yes	Yes	
Mega Man X Legacy Collection 2	Xbox One	July 24, 2018	Capcom	Yes	Yes	Yes	Yes	
Mega Man X2	Super Nintendo Entertainment System	December 16, 1994	Capcom	Yes	Yes	Yes	Yes	
Mega Man X3	Super Nintendo Entertainment System	December 1, 1995	Minakuchi Engineering	Yes	Yes	Yes		
Mega Man X3	PlayStation	April 26, 1996	Capcom	Yes		Yes		
Mega Man X3	Sega Saturn	April 26, 1996	Capcom	Yes		Yes		
Mega Man X3	Microsoft Windows	March 28, 1997	Capcom	Yes	Yes	Yes		
Mega Man X3	Virtual Console	August 28, 2014	Minakuchi Engineering	Yes	Yes	Yes	Yes	
Mega Man X4	PlayStation	August 1, 1997	Capcom	Yes	Yes			
Mega Man X4	Sega Saturn	August 1, 1997	Capcom	Yes	Yes			
Mega Man X4	Microsoft Windows	December 3, 1998	Capcom	Yes	Yes	Yes		
Mega Man X4	PlayStation Network	December 17, 2014	Capcom	Yes	Yes			
Mega Man X5	PlayStation	November 30, 2000	Capcom	Yes	Yes	Yes		
Mega Man X5	Microsoft Windows	July 30, 2001	Capcom	Yes	Yes	Yes	Yes	
Mega Man X5	PlayStation Network	September 9, 2014	Capcom	Yes	Yes			
Mega Man X6	PlayStation	November 29, 2001	Capcom	Yes	Yes	Yes		
Mega Man X6	Microsoft Windows	December 13, 2002	Capcom				Yes	
Mega Man X6	PlayStation Network	July 8, 2015	Capcom	Yes				
Mega Man X7	PlayStation 2	July 17, 2003	Capcom	Yes	Yes	Yes		
Mega Man X7	Microsoft Windows	2004	Capcom				Yes	
Mega Man X8	PlayStation 2	December 7, 2004	Capcom	Yes	Yes	Yes		
Mega Man X8	Microsoft Windows	March 10, 2005	Capcom	Yes		Yes		
Mega Man X8	PlayStation Network	December 16, 2015	Capcom	Yes				
Mega Man Xtreme	Game Boy Color	October 20, 2000	Capcom	Yes	Yes	Yes		
Mega Man Xtreme 2	Game Boy Color	July 19, 2001	Capcom	Yes	Yes	Yes		
Mega Man Xtreme 2	Virtual Console	December 25, 2013	Capcom	Yes	Yes	Yes	Yes	
Mega Man Zero	Game Boy Advance	October 22, 2014	Inti Creates	Yes	Yes	Yes		
Mega Man Zero	Virtual Console	December 25, 2013	Inti Creates	Yes	Yes	Yes	Yes	
Mega Man Zero 2	Game Boy Advance	May 2, 2003	Inti Creates	Yes	Yes	Yes		
Mega Man Zero 2	Virtual Console	January 7, 2015	Inti Creates	Yes	Yes	Yes	Yes	
Mega Man Zero 3	Game Boy Advance	April 23, 2004	Inti Creates	Yes	Yes	Yes		
Mega Man Zero 3	Virtual Console	March 26, 2015	Inti Creates	Yes	Yes	Yes	Yes	
Mega Man Zero 4	Game Boy Advance	April 21, 2005	Inti Creates	Yes	Yes	Yes	Yes	
Mega Man Zero 4	Virtual Console	May 14, 2015	Inti Creates	Yes	Yes	Yes	Yes	
Mega Man Zero Collection	Nintendo DS	June 8, 2010	Inti Creates	Yes	Yes	Yes	Yes	
Mega Man ZX	Nintendo DS	July 6, 2006	Inti Creates	Yes	Yes	Yes	Yes	
Mega Man ZX Advent	Nintendo DS	July 12, 2007	Inti Creates	Yes	Yes	Yes	Yes	
Mega Man: Maverick Hunter X	PlayStation Portable	December 15, 2005	Capcom	Yes	Yes	Yes	Yes	
Mega Man: The Power Battle	Arcade	October 18, 1995	Capcom	Yes				
Mega Man: The Wily Wars	Sega Mega Drive/Genesis	October 21, 1994	Minakuchi Engineering	Yes	Yes	Yes	Yes	
Mega Twins	Amiga	1991		Yes	Yes	Yes	Yes	
Mega Twins	Arcade	June 19, 1990	Capcom	Yes	Yes	Yes	Yes	
Mega Twins	Atari ST	1991	Twilight	Yes	Yes	Yes	Yes	
Mega Twins	PC Engine	1992	NEC Avenue	Yes				
Mega Twins	Sega Mega Drive/Genesis	1994	Visco	Yes	Yes	Yes	Yes	
Mercs	Amiga	April 1990	Tiertex	Yes	Yes	Yes		
Mercs	Amstrad CPC	April 1990		Yes	Yes	Yes		
Mercs	Arcade	March 2, 1990	Capcom	Yes	Yes	Yes		
Mercs	Atari ST	April 1990	Tiertex	Yes	Yes	Yes		
Mercs	Commodore 64	April 1990		Yes	Yes	Yes		
Mercs	Virtual Console	February 9, 2009		Yes	Yes	Yes		
Mercs	ZX Spectrum	April 1990		Yes	Yes	Yes		
Metal Walker	Game Boy Color	December 24, 1999	Capcom	Yes	Yes			
Mickey Mousecapade	Nintendo Entertainment System	March 6, 1987	Hudson Soft	Yes	Yes			
Mickey's Dangerous Chase	Game Boy	May 15, 1991	Now Production	Yes	Yes	Yes		
Mighty Final Fight	Nintendo Entertainment System	June 11, 1993	Capcom	Yes	Yes	Yes	Yes	
Mighty Final Fight	Virtual Console	January 29, 2014	Capcom	Yes	Yes	Yes	Yes	
Minute to Win It	iOS	March 17, 2011	Capcom		Yes	Yes	Yes	
Mizushima Shinji no Daikoushien	Nintendo Entertainment System	October 26, 1990	Capcom	Yes				
Mobile Suit Gundam SEED: Federation vs ZAFT	Arcade	July 2005	Capcom	Yes				
Mobile Suit Gundam SEED: Federation vs ZAFT	PlayStation 2	November 17, 2005	Capcom	Yes				
Mobile Suit Gundam SEED: Federation vs ZAFT	PlayStation Portable	April 5, 2007	Capcom	Yes				
Mobile Suit Gundam: AEUG Vs Titans	Arcade	September 2003	Capcom	Yes				
Mobile Suit Gundam: AEUG Vs Titans	PlayStation 2	September 2003	Capcom	Yes				
Mobile Suit Gundam: Federation vs. Zeon	Arcade	December 6, 2001	Capcom	Yes	Yes	Yes		
Mobile Suit Gundam: Federation vs. Zeon	PlayStation 2	December 6, 2001	Capcom	Yes	Yes	Yes		
Mobile Suit Gundam: Federation vs. Zeon DX	Dreamcast	December 6, 2001	Capcom	Yes	Yes	Yes		
Monster Hunter	PlayStation 2	March 11, 2004	Capcom	Yes	Yes	Yes	Yes	
Monster Hunter 2	PlayStation 2	February 16, 2006	Capcom	Yes				
Monster Hunter 3 Ultimate	Nintendo 3DS	December 10, 2011	Capcom	Yes	Yes	Yes	Yes	
Monster Hunter 3 Ultimate	Wii U	December 8, 2012	Capcom	Yes	Yes	Yes	Yes	
Monster Hunter 4	Nintendo 3DS	September 14, 2013	Capcom	Yes				
Monster Hunter Freedom	PlayStation Portable	December 1, 2005	Capcom	Yes	Yes	Yes	Yes	
Monster Hunter Freedom 2	PlayStation Portable	February 22, 2007	Capcom	Yes	Yes	Yes	Yes	
Monster Hunter Freedom Unite	PlayStation Portable	March 27, 2008	Capcom	Yes	Yes	Yes	Yes	
Monster Hunter Freedom Unite	iOS	May 8, 2014	Capcom	Yes	Yes	Yes	Yes	
Monster Hunter Frontier G	Microsoft Windows	April 17, 2013	Capcom	Yes				
Monster Hunter Frontier G	Xbox 360	April 17, 2013	Capcom	Yes				
Monster Hunter Frontier G	PlayStation 3	November 20, 2013	Capcom	Yes				
Monster Hunter Frontier G	Wii U	December 11, 2013	Capcom	Yes				
Monster Hunter Frontier G	PlayStation Vita	August 13, 2014	Capcom	Yes				
Monster Hunter Frontier Online	Microsoft Windows	June 21, 2007	Capcom	Yes				
Monster Hunter Frontier Online	Xbox Live Marketplace	June 24, 2010	Capcom	Yes				
Monster Hunter G	PlayStation 2	January 20, 2005	Capcom	Yes			Yes	
Monster Hunter G	Wii	April 23, 2009	Capcom	Yes				
Monster Hunter Generations / Monster Hunter X	Nintendo 3DS	November 28, 2015	Capcom	Yes				
Monster Hunter Generations / Monster Hunter X	Nintendo 3DS	July 15, 2016	Capcom		Yes	Yes	Yes	
Monster Hunter Generations Ultimate / Monster Hunter XX	Nintendo 3DS	March 18, 2017	Capcom	Yes				
Monster Hunter Generations Ultimate / Monster Hunter XX	Nintendo Switch	August 25, 2017	Capcom	Yes				
Monster Hunter Generations Ultimate / Monster Hunter XX	Nintendo Switch	August 28, 2018	Capcom		Yes	Yes		
Monster Hunter Now	iOS	September 14, 2023	Niantic	Yes	Yes	Yes	Yes	
Monster Hunter Now	Android	September 14, 2023	Niantic	Yes	Yes	Yes	Yes	
Monster Hunter Portable 3rd	PlayStation Portable	December 1, 2010	Capcom	Yes			Yes	
Monster Hunter Portable 3rd HD ver.	PlayStation 3	August 25, 2011	Capcom	Yes				
Monster Hunter Stories	Nintendo 3DS	October 8, 2016	Marvelous	Yes				
Monster Hunter Stories	iOS	December 4, 2017	Marvelous	Yes	Yes	Yes		
Monster Hunter Stories	Android	December 4, 2017	Marvelous	Yes	Yes	Yes		
Monster Hunter Stories	Nintendo Switch	June 14, 2024	Marvelous	Yes	Yes	Yes	Yes	
Monster Hunter Stories	Microsoft Windows	June 14, 2024	Marvelous	Yes	Yes	Yes	Yes	
Monster Hunter Stories	PlayStation 4	June 14, 2024	Marvelous	Yes	Yes	Yes	Yes	
Monster Hunter Stories	Xbox One	November 14, 2025	Marvelous	Yes	Yes	Yes	Yes	
Monster Hunter Stories 2: Wings of Ruin	Nintendo Switch	July 9, 2021	Marvelous	Yes	Yes	Yes	Yes	
Monster Hunter Stories 2: Wings of Ruin	Microsoft Windows	July 9, 2021	Marvelous	Yes	Yes	Yes	Yes	
Monster Hunter Stories 2: Wings of Ruin	PlayStation 4	June 14, 2024	Marvelous	Yes	Yes	Yes	Yes	
Monster Hunter Stories 2: Wings of Ruin	Xbox One	November 14, 2025	Marvelous	Yes	Yes	Yes	Yes	
Monster Hunter Tri	Wii	August 1, 2009	Capcom	Yes	Yes	Yes	Yes	
Monster Hunter Rise	Nintendo Switch	March 26, 2021	Capcom	Yes	Yes	Yes	Yes	
Monster Hunter Rise	Microsoft Windows	January 12, 2022	Capcom	Yes	Yes	Yes	Yes	
Monster Hunter Rise	PlayStation 4	January 20, 2023	Capcom	Yes	Yes	Yes	Yes	
Monster Hunter Rise	PlayStation 5	January 20, 2023	Capcom	Yes	Yes	Yes	Yes	
Monster Hunter Rise	Xbox One	January 20, 2023	Capcom	Yes	Yes	Yes	Yes	
Monster Hunter Rise	Xbox Series X/S	January 20, 2023	Capcom	Yes	Yes	Yes	Yes	
Monster Hunter Wilds	PlayStation 5	February 28, 2025	Capcom	Yes	Yes	Yes	Yes	
Monster Hunter Wilds	Xbox Series X/S	February 28, 2025	Capcom	Yes	Yes	Yes	Yes	
Monster Hunter Wilds	Microsoft Windows	February 28, 2025	Capcom	Yes	Yes	Yes	Yes	
Monster Hunter: World	PlayStation 4	January 26, 2018	Capcom	Yes	Yes	Yes	Yes	
Monster Hunter: World	Xbox One	January 26, 2018	Capcom	Yes	Yes	Yes	Yes	
Monster Hunter: World	Microsoft Windows	August 9, 2018	Capcom	Yes	Yes	Yes	Yes	
MotoGP	Wii	October 30, 2008	Milestone srl		Yes	Yes	Yes	
MotoGP '07	PlayStation 2	October 1, 2007	Milestone srl	Yes	Yes	Yes	Yes	
MotoGP '08	PlayStation 2	October 24, 2008	Milestone srl		Yes	Yes	Yes	
MotoGP '08	PlayStation 3	October 24, 2008	Milestone srl		Yes	Yes	Yes	
MotoGP '08	Xbox 360	October 24, 2008	Milestone srl		Yes	Yes	Yes	
MotoGP '08	Microsoft Windows	October 24, 2008	Milestone srl		Yes	Yes		
MotoGP 09/10	PlayStation 3	March 18, 2010	Monumental Games		Yes	Yes	Yes	
MotoGP 09/10	Xbox 360	March 18, 2010	Monumental Games		Yes	Yes	Yes	
MotoGP 10/11	PlayStation 3	March 15, 2011	Monumental Games		Yes	Yes	Yes	
MotoGP 10/11	Xbox 360	March 15, 2011	Monumental Games		Yes	Yes	Yes	
Mr. Bill	iOS	September 24, 2010	Capcom		Yes	Yes	Yes	
Muscle Bomber	CPS Changer	July 13, 1993	Capcom	Yes	Yes	Yes	Yes	
Muscle Bomber 2	CPS Changer	September 2, 1994	Capcom	Yes	Yes	Yes	Yes	
Muscle Bomber Duo	Arcade	December 6, 1993	Capcom	Yes	Yes	Yes	Yes	
Muscle Bomber: The Body Explosion	FM Towns	July 13, 1993	Capcom	Yes	Yes	Yes	Yes	
