= Super Mario Bros. Crossover =

2010 fan-made video game

- Developer: Jay Pavlina
- Publisher: Exploding Rabbit
- Platforms: Windows, Mac, Linux, Adobe Flash
- Release: April 27, 2010
- Genre: Platforming
- Mode: Single-player

Super Mario Bros. Crossover is a fan-made crossover platform Flash video game launched on Newgrounds on April 27, 2010 by Exploding Rabbit. It is based mostly on the gameplay of Nintendo's Super Mario Bros. for the NES. The only major difference is the ability to control characters that debuted in other Nintendo Entertainment System games unrelated to the Mario series, plus the ability to use "skins" of levels and characters from other games and platforms. The latest version available (3.1.21) was released on December 27, 2013.

== Gameplay ==
Super Mario Bros. Crossover is a Flash browser-based platforming game. The game's levels and graphics are all primarily duplicates of those found in Super Mario Bros.; each of the game's eight worlds feature four levels. In three of the levels, the goal is to reach a checkpoint to complete the level, while the final level has the player facing against Bowser in hopes of rescuing Princess Peach. Enemies such as Goombas, Koopa Troopas and Hammer Bros. will block the player's attempt to make it successfully through the level. As Mario and Luigi, the player can jump on enemies to kill them, use Koopa shells to knock enemies over, and acquire powerups from special blocks that serve to boost health, shoot fireballs, or remain invincible for a short period of time. They can hit enemies by jumping on them by default, while other characters can only do so by changing the settings. Besides completing the level, the player can also earn coins and points, attempting to achieve a high score.

Crossover varies this formula by adding in several additional main characters in addition to Mario that the player can play. In the same manner as with Super Mario Bros. 2, the player selects one of the additional characters at the start of each level. Each character, based on other classic Nintendo Entertainment System games, uses different attacks and movements that are related to their original game, as well as their own signature music depending on which character is used, on which games the sprite is based on and the console the character or game is from. The characters also have skins, like sprites from other games or another character, usually from the same series, and some even have their own differences in gameplay outside of using the music from another game, including sprites coming from alternate weapons from their own games, finding a different character at the end of a castle stage, and a different character to rescue at the end. Only Mario, Luigi and their respective skins can damage enemies with a jump without activating an option for it, the others just get hurt on contact.

- Link, based on The Legend of Zelda, uses a sword to attack enemies and a boomerang to stun them. He can also use bombs that penetrate defenses. Collecting powerups increases the potency of the sword's attacks and the range of his boomerang. He is the only character with fundamental control changes from his original game, being given the ability to jump and thrust his sword upwards and downwards, moves that originated in Zelda II: The Adventure of Link. By collecting the Blue Ring, he can use his bombs without getting hurt by their explosions, while the Red Ring allows him to fire magic beams from his sword, and the Magic Boomerang has more range than the standard boomerang. He must save Princess Zelda and rescues an old man at the end of each castle, through his Link's Awakening incarnation saves the owl in every castle but the last one. His skins include:
  - Dark Link, his dark counterpart, who has to rescue Ganon;
  - Princess Zelda, who rescues Impa in-between castles (an old man if she's in her Oracle of Seasons skin) and has to save Link;
  - Ralph, from Oracle of Ages, who rescues a monkey in most castles and has to save Nayru at the end;
  - An Old Man, who rescues a merchant in-between castles and an old woman at the end;
  - Cecil Harvey from Final Fantasy IV, who has two skins based on his Dark Knight and Paladin appearances in the game and has to save Rosa;
  - Bartz Klauser from Final Fantasy V, who starts in a blue tunic instead of a green one and has to save his Chocobo, Boko.
- Mega Man possesses the Mega Buster, which he can use to fire forward to destroy enemies and charge shots if he has a Mushroom; he can also slide under small spaces. His skins tend to show him with or without his helmet, depending on which one, and a few of them use his original name, Rock. Within version 1.1, Mega Man's jump height is reduced; however, he can call in Rush, his robotic dog, to assist in high jumps with his Rush Coil. He saves Eddie from Mega Man 4 at the end of a castle, and he must rescue his father/creator, Dr. Thomas Light. Later versions also added special weapons from his own games, and he can switch to any weapon at any time, but the use requires him to have enough weapon energy, which he can find defeating enemies. He can use the Super Arm from the first game, the Metal Blade from Mega Man 2, the Hard Knuckle from, Mega Man 3, the Pharaoh Shot from Mega Man 4, the Screw Crusher from Mega Man III and Mega Man 10, the Charge Kick from Mega Man 5, the Flame Blast from Mega Man 6, the Magma Bazooka from Mega Man 9 and the Water Shield from Mega Man 10. He can also find the Energy Balancer, which automatically restores weapon energy for the special weapon that has the least amount of weapon energy if he picks up a Weapon capsule while using the Mega Buster. When he has a special weapon active, his color scheme changes depending on which weapon he's using, and this also allies for many of his skins. His skins include:
  - Rock, his unarmored self, who cannot slide or fire charge shots;
  - Quint from Mega Man II, a future self of him that Dr. Wily had kidnapped. He rescues a Metall at the end of castle stages and has to save Dr. Wily.
  - Proto Man, his older brother, who has to save his sister Roll. He has a skin based on his appearance as Break Man in his debut game, Mega Man 3, and much like some other skin, his version of the Rush Coil is the Proto Coil, a trampoline he uses in Mega Man 9. Unlike Mega Man, he can fire charge shots without needing a mushroom, but he can only fire two shots at a time instead of three and takes more knockback if he gets hit;
  - Roll, his younger sister, who was playable in the Japanese-only mobile port of the first game. She has to rescue her brother Rock at the end, and instead of calling Rush, she summons Tango, a robotic cat who appeared in Mega Man V;
  - Dr. Light, his creator. If he's controlled by the player, the Hard Knuckle and the Water Shield are replaced by the Hornet Chaser and the Jewel Satellite from Mega Man 9. Instead of using an arm cannon, he fires with a gun at enemies. He has to save his robotic son Rock;
  - Cut Man, one of the Robot Masters from the first game, who was created by Dr. Light and is one of Mega Man's brothers. He rescues a Metall at the end of each castle, and like Mega Man, he has to save his creator, Dr. Light. His shots always pierce through enemies, and he can also break blocks above him with his head like Mario and Luigi when they have a mushroom. His version of the Metal Blade is the Drill Bomb from Mega Man 4, while his version of the Bubble Shield is the Star Crash from Mega Man 5;
  - Fire Man: Another one of Dr. Light's Robot Masters from the first game. His shots are based on his special weapon, the Fire Storm, and they deal more damage. He's also immune to the fire traps in castle stages. His version of the Pharaoh Shot is the Atomic Fire from Mega Man 2, his version of the Screw Crusher takes the form of and enemy that jumps from lava and his version of the Bubble Shield is the Scorch Wheel from Mega Man 7;
  - Ice Man: Another Robot Master created by Dr. Light. His shots are based on his special weapon, the Ice Slasher, and while uncharged shots are weaker, his charge shots can freeze enemies. His version of the Metal Blade is the Freezer Cracker from Mega Man 7 and his version of the Flame Blast is the Chill Spike from Mega Man 10.
- Samus Aran, from the Metroid games, has an arm cannon she can fire and which gains power with powerups to increase her shots' range. Samus is also able to transform into her "Morph Ball" form, rolling through narrow spaces and planting bombs when she's transformed. As of version 1.1, the player starts off playing as Samus without her Power Suit, and upon the capture of a mushroom, gains her Power Suit, while her appearances without it later became new skins. In version 1.2, Samus can pick up missiles when enemies are defeated. Each missile sprite icon gives Samus two missiles. She can also get the Varia Suit, which makes her immune to the fire traps, the Screw Attack, which damages enemies during a spinning jump, the Ice Beam, which can freeze enemies to turno them into temporary platforms, and the Wave Beam, which moves diagonally up and down during its trajectory. Samus has to rescue the Baby Metroid.
- Simon Belmont, the protagonist of the early Castlevania games, has a whip and can throw axes at foes, the attack strength and number of axes on screen increasing with additional powerups. He has the ability to double jump, which he doesn't have in the original games. His jump was also modified to be easier to control than the original games, but can be changed back in the options with Classic mode.
- Bill Rizer, one of the playable characters in Contra, uses a rifle to fire on enemies, which increases in power and spread with further powerups. He can shoot in all directions except directly below him, even when jumping, and he can also shoot while crouching. However, unlike other characters, he always dies in one hit, as Super Mushrooms don't give him an extra hit. He has to rescue his partner, Lance, and this is reversed if Lance is used by the player instead.
- Ryu Hayabusa from Ninja Gaiden was added in the version 1.1 release. Ryu, as a ninja, is able to use a sword and throwing stars; he also has the ability to climb and jump walls.
- Sophia the 3rd, the tank vehicle from Blaster Master, was added in the version 1.2 release. Sophia's capabilities include hovering, clinging to walls and ceilings, and homing missiles. Sophia is also the first character with a limited amount of ammunition and power, requiring the player to refill these capacities through collection from defeated foes.
- Luigi, Mario's brother from the Super Mario Bros. series, was introduced in version 2.0. Luigi uses his gameplay from Super Mario Bros.: The Lost Levels, being able to jump higher at the cost of reduced traction, which makes it harder to avoid enemies and pitfalls.
- Bass, from Mega Man 10, was introduced in version 2.0 and has similar play to Mega Man. However, his arm cannon acts differently, being able to shoot in seven directions at the cost of not being able to charge. Instead of a slide, Bass has a dash that is faster than Mega Man's, but he cannot slide under small spaces. Like in Mega Man & Bass, he can double jump.

In the version 2.0 update, character skins were a new and unique feature that allowed all characters to look different and have new music along with them. Some skins are the same character but from a different game in their respective franchise, while others are from completely different franchises. The 3.0 update added additional character skins, special rendering modes to mimic other earlier computer gaming hardware, and levels inspired by the limited-release Super Mario Bros. Special.

== Development ==
The game was created by Jay Pavlina. Further development is done by Zach Robinson, Mathew Valente, et al. Music was emulated with Blargg's Game Music Emu. It took 15 months to create. It was written using ActionScript 3, and made in Adobe Flash CS5. The game was instantly popular on Newgrounds where it was first posted. After its first six hours online, the game had 12,000 views and had won two awards. His next update, version 1.2, released on December 15, 2010, included Sophia the 3rd as a playable character, as well as some minor bugfixes. Versions 1.0 and 1.1 were called Super Mario Crossover.

Version 2.0, released on February 9, 2012, added Luigi and Bass as playable characters. The update also allowed the user to switch between various graphical looks resembling other games from the Super Mario Bros. series, including Super Mario Land 2: 6 Golden Coins and Super Mario Bros. 3.

In March 2012, Zach Robinson made a poll deciding which game between Super Mario Bros.: The Lost Levels and Super Mario Bros. Special will end up being in a future update. While Super Mario Bros.: The Lost Levels received more votes, Jay Pavlina showed more interest in Special, which was slated for inclusion in version 3.0. He later released The Lost Levels in version 3.1, slated as the last major release.

An Atari-style version of Super Mario Bros. Crossover was also created as an April Fools' joke, but the graphics and music have since been incorporated into version 3.0.

In November 2014, all non Exploding Rabbit related topics on the Exploding Rabbit forums were moved to "New Game Plus" at www.new-game-plus.com, a new site that was not owned by Pavlina. New Game Plus lasted for three years until it closed down in November 2017 due to lack of funds to keep the server up.

A WebGL port of the game was planned under version 4.0 with an experimental preview. However, it was ultimately canceled due to Pavlina getting a demanding job.

=== Spiritual succssor ===
In June 2012, Exploding Rabbit started a Kickstarter campaign to raise money for Super Retro Squad, a game inspired by Crossover. As all the elements in Crossover are copyrighted, lead developer Jay Pavlina recognized he would not be able to make any profit on his time spent for that game, thus Super Retro Squad would feature original characters, art, and gameplay inspired by the characters and games from Crossover, and would be a commercial endeavour. The Kickstarter surpassed its initial $10,000 request, raising $53,509, and additional features were promised for having surpassed the goal.

Unlike Crossover, Super Retro Squad was being made by a team of six members hand-picked by Jay. Development on Super Retro Squad began on October 1, 2012, under the Unity game engine. The project went under many changes, including visuals and game mechanics. By September 2013, it was renamed as Super Action Squad. Its development was indefinitely suspended.

In February 2017, Exploding Rabbit announced that development on Super Action Squad had resumed under the name Glitch Strikers. It was planned to be released episodically through level packs, with each pack being based around a different character's environment and game; the Super Mario Bros. parody "Hyper Manni Pals" would be available by default, while the others would be distributed as downloadable content. While successfully approved via Steam Greenlight, it remains unreleased in any capacity.

== Reception ==
Super Mario Bros. Crossover has received positive attention from gaming journalists. Wired's Chris Kohler considered the game a "surprisingly thoughtful 8-bit mashup" and praised Pavlina's efforts for "how these six disparate characters all feel like they were ripped from their own classic NES titles, but fit in perfectly to the Mario levels". Margaret Lyons from Entertainment Weekly called the combination of characters with the Mario universe "a mindfrak for the ages". Dan Ryckert of Game Informer appreciated the attention to detail, from both the original levels of Super Mario Bros., and the music and sound effects from the other games, that were present in the game.

== See also ==
- List of unofficial Mario media
