= MM3 =

MM3 may refer to:

- MM3 (force field), a class of force fields in chemistry
- mm^{3}, a cubic millimetre or microlitre
- Mm^{3}, a cubic megametre or zettalitre, Litre#SI prefixes applied to the litre
- Mega Man 3, a 1990 video game for the NES
- Might and Magic III: Isles of Terra, a 1991 video game for the PC and many other platforms
- Mega Man III (Game Boy), a 1992 video game for the Game Boy
- Midtown Madness 3, a 2003 video game for the Xbox
- The Minuteman III intercontinental ballistic missile.
- MM3 register, a CPU register used by the MMX extension
