= List of Capcom games =

Capcom's current logo

Capcom is a Japanese video game development and publishing company formed from a merger on June 11, 1983. In addition to arcade and consumer video games, it also produced a number of pinball games and non-video arcade games. The company is known for several game series which became multi-million selling franchises, such as Street Fighter, Marvel vs. Capcom, Mega Man, Resident Evil, Devil May Cry, Dead Rising, Monster Hunter, Sengoku Basara, Onimusha, and Ace Attorney. The company has developed or published hundreds of titles in several video game franchises on numerous gaming platforms.

Capcom releases numerous games in regions outside Japan, such as North America, Southeast Asia, and Europe. Often the game names are changed for that region. The titles used in the table are the English titles, unless they were only released in Japan.

== Lists ==
- List of Capcom games: 0–D
- List of Capcom games: E–L
- List of Capcom games: M
- List of Capcom games: N–R
- List of Capcom games: S
- List of Capcom games: T–Z

== Franchises ==
- 194X
- Ace Attorney
- Asura's Wrath
- Bionic Commando
- Breath of Fire
- Captain Commando
- Chaos Legion
- Cyberbots
- Darkstalkers
- Dead Rising
- Devil May Cry
- Dino Crisis
- Dragon's Dogma
- Exoprimal
- Final Fight
- Ghosts 'n Goblins
- God Hand
- Lost Planet
- Marvel vs. Capcom
- Mega Man
- Monster Hunter
- Okami
- Onimusha
- Power Stone
- Pragmata
- Resident Evil
- Rival Schools
- Sengoku Basara
- SonSon
- Star Gladiator
- Steel Battalion
- Street Fighter
- Strider
- Viewtiful Joe
