= Mega Man II (1991 video game) =

Action-platform video game

- North American cover art
- Developer: Thinking Rabbit
- Publisher: Capcom: EU: Nintendo
- Producer: Tokuro Fujiwara
- Artist: Keiji Inafune
- Composer: Kenji Yamazaki
- Series: Mega Man
- Platform: Game Boy
- Release: JP: December 20, 1991; NA: February 1992; EU: 1992
- Genre: Platform
- Mode: Single-player

Mega Man II (Note: Japanese: ロックマンワールド2, Hepburn: Rokkuman Wārudo 2; lit. 'Rockman World 2') is a 1991 platform game developed by Thinking Rabbit and published by Capcom for the Game Boy. It is the second handheld game in the original Mega Man franchise after Mega Man: Dr. Wily's Revenge. The game follows Mega Man as he pursues his arch-enemy Dr. Wily, whose most recent ploy for world domination involves the theft of an experimental time machine. Mega Man confronts both Wily and a number of enemies from his past, including a new and mysterious robot named Quint. Just like other Game Boy games in the series, Mega Man II combines elements from two consecutive Nintendo Entertainment System (NES) titles, in this case, Mega Man 2 and Mega Man 3.

Mega Man II received mixed reviews from critics, in part due to Thinking Rabbit's inexperience in developing similar games, and is considered to be the weakest of the five Game Boy games due to its bland level design and poor soundtrack. As a result of the game's reception, Thinking Rabbit did not return for its sequels, and development of the Game Boy games returned to Minakuchi Engineering.

== Plot ==
The storyline of Mega Man II involves the hero Mega Man battling his arch-nemesis Dr. Wily as the latter once again attempts to take over the world. This time around the evil genius has stolen an experimental "Time Skimmer" from the world's Chronos Institute and used it to travel 37.426 years into the future. Meanwhile, thanks to the sense of smell of the robot dog Rush, Dr. Light found out about the theft. Worried about the situation, he sends Mega Man to investigate an underground passageway containing enemy Robot Masters from his previous adventures. Mega Man destroys them again and makes his way to Wily's fortress, which contains four more Robot Masters from his past. Once they are destroyed, Mega Man advances and comes upon Quint, a future version of himself. Wily had captured Quint in the future, remodeled him, and brought him back to the present. After Mega Man beats him, Quint relinquishes his "Sakugarne" jackhammer weapon to the hero. Mega Man follows Wily to a space station and defeats him.

== Gameplay ==
Mega Man in a boss fight with Clash Man. The game continues the Game Boy series trend of recycling elements from two consecutive NES titles: Mega Man 2 and Mega Man 3.

As with other games in the series, Mega Man II is a side-scrolling platformer in which the player takes control of the hero Mega Man as he traverses stages and defeats various enemies and bosses. The player can run, jump, and shoot as in the previous game, but is now able to slide along the ground as well. The outset of the game allows the player to choose among four stages to be completed in any order. Beating the Robot Master boss at the end of the stage allows the player to access its unique weapon for the remainder of the game. These weapons have limited ammunition that can be refilled by picking up items dropped by enemies. Spare energy tanks can be obtained and selected to completely refill the player's health.

Defeating some Robot Masters will grant Mega Man access to three adaptors for his canine companion Rush to be used in different environments. The Rush Coil allows Mega Man a very high jump; the Rush Marine turns the dog into a submarine for easy underwater mobility, and the Rush Jet lets Mega Man cross large distances. Like Dr. Wily's Revenge, Mega Man II takes many elements from the NES Mega Man games. The first four stages and their bosses (Wood Man, Air Man, Clash [sic] Man, and Metal Man) come from Mega Man 2. After traveling to Wily's fortress, four new stages become available via a teleportation room. The bosses for these stages (Top Man, Hard Man, Magnet Man, and Needle Man) are taken from Mega Man 3.

== Development and release ==
Capcom outsourced the development of Mega Man II to Thinking Rabbit, developer of Sokoban, instead of prominent partner Minakuchi Engineering who worked on Mega Man: Dr. Wily's Revenge. Series artist Keiji Inafune admitted that the design quality of Mega Man II feeling different from the other games was the result of the developer having very little knowledge of the series. For the next game in the Game Boy line, they decided to return to the developer of Mega Man: Dr. Wily’s Revenge.

Mega Man II was re-released as part of the Nintendo Player's Choice line of budget titles in North America. The game was made available on the Japanese Nintendo Power cartridge service on March 13, 2001. Capcom had planned to release a full-color compilation of all five Game Boy games on the Game Boy Advance in 2004, but the project was cancelled. On July 18, 2013, it was confirmed that Mega Man II was planned to release on the Nintendo 3DS's Virtual Console, which released in Japan on September 25, 2013, in North America on May 8, 2014, and in PAL regions on August 7, 2014. It was also released on the Nintendo Classics service for the Nintendo Switch with its predecessor and sequels on June 7, 2024.

== Reception ==
Reception

Aggregate score
Aggregator	Score
GameRankings	68.83%

Review scores
Publication	Score
Electronic Gaming Monthly	8/10, 8/10, 8/10, 8/10
Famitsu	5/10, 6/10, 6/10, 5/10
Nintendo Life	3/10
Nintendo World Report	6/10

Mega Man II received mixed to positive reviews at release. Electronic Gaming Monthly awarded it 80% in a March 1992 review, praising its gameplay and recreation of elements from the NES games. Nintendo Power ranked the game 2nd in their top 10 Game Boy games of 1992. Famitsu magazine awarded it a total of 22/40 points.

Retrospective reviews have been negative. Jeremy Parish of 1UP.com opined that Mega Man II was "Not Worth It!" in a 2007 roundup review, summarizing it as "a random assortment of enemies and stages from Mega Man 2 and Mega Man 3 from NES, downsampled and downscaled for Game Boy". Philip Reed of Nintendo Life, reviewing the 3DS re-release, panned the game, calling it a "stain on the series" and strongly criticizing the graphics and audio. Zachary Miller of Nintendo World Report was similarly critical, writing that it "makes everything incredibly easy, then screws up the music and sound effects".

== Related media ==
The Archie Comics series incorporated elements of the game, though a full adaptation was not produced before the series went on hiatus. Quint notably appeared twice in issue 20, displaying elements of his own character as well as that of Rockman Shadow, the primary antagonist of Rockman & Forte: Challenger from the Future. He subsequently made appearances in issue 55, in which Dr. Light saw in a vision his conflict with the present-day Mega Man followed by Mega Man's transformation into Quint in the future.
