= Mega Man V (1994 video game) =

Action-platform video game

- North American cover art
- Developer: Minakuchi Engineering
- Publisher: Capcom
- Producer: Tokuro Fujiwara
- Artist: Keiji Inafune
- Series: Mega Man
- Platform: Game Boy
- Release: JP: July 22, 1994; NA: September 1994; EU: 1994
- Mode: Single-player

Mega Man V (Note: Known in Japan as Rockman World 5 (Japanese: ロックマンワールド5, Hepburn: Rokkuman Wārudo Faibu)) is a video game developed by Minakuchi Engineering and published by Capcom for the Game Boy. It is the fifth game in the handheld series of the Mega Man franchise. The game follows the adventures of the protagonist Mega Man as he must defend the Earth from a group of powerful robots from outer space called the Stardroids. Mega Man V is unique among the Game Boy Mega Man games as it features original bosses rather than recycling those from the Nintendo Entertainment System (NES) Mega Man games.

Mega Man V is an action platformer in which the player selects stages in a non-linear fashion and acquires the weapon of each boss defeated to use as their own. Although it plays nearly identical to other games in the series, Mega Man V features a new default weapon (the powerful "Mega Arm") and introduces Tango, a new assistant character. Mega Man V received a positive critical reception, with critics considering it to be one of the best games in the series and praising its relative ambition with its original content, but it also received criticism for the lack of innovation in the series' core gameplay.

== Plot ==
The game opens in an unspecified year in the 21st century ("20XX AD"), several months after the events of Mega Man IV and another failure by the infamous Dr. Wily to conquer the world, with Ballade sacrificing his own life to help Mega Man escape the Wily Battleship. One day, Mega Man and his sister Roll are strolling through a grassy field, when they are confronted by a mysterious robot who calls himself Terra. Mega Man attempts to fight Terra, only to find that his "Mega Buster" arm cannon has no effect on him due to the alien material he's made of. Unable to damage Terra, Mega Man gets defeated and falls unconscious. Meanwhile, Terra and other eight powerful robots he's the leader of, the "Stardroids", attack Earth, and with Mega Man defeated, no one can stop them, taking control of the cities in just a few hours. Waking up in Dr. Light's laboratory, Mega Man is equipped with a new and powerful alternative weapon, the "Mega Arm", to help him fight the Stardroids in his newest mission to save the planet. During his battles, he is also helped by a new robot companion created by Dr. Light, Tango the cat.

After defeating all the Stardroids, Mega Man locates Terra (who tells him that he has meddled in his plans for the last time) in a distant celestial body and has a rematch with him, but this time, he comes out victorious. However, Mega Man finds out that his archenemy Dr. Wily was ordering them to dominate Earth. Mega Man sets off to the mad scientist's new space base, the Wily Star (a reference to the Death Star) to stop him. In the base, Mega Man has rematches with four foes from his previous adventures (Enker, Quint, Punk, and Ballade) as well as all of the Stardroids (minus Terra). Then, after Mega Man defeats Dr. Wily in a battle, Wily releases an ancient robot called Sunstar to destroy Mega Man. However, Sunstar attacks Wily instead, and then turns his attention to Mega Man.

After a tough battle, Mega Man defeats Sunstar and tries to convince him to be repaired by Dr. Light. Sunstar is surprised by his kindness towards an enemy who just tried to kill him, and in response, Mega Man explains to him his ideals of a world of everlasting peace where humans and robots cohexist in harmony, which moves Sunstar, as peace was impossible in his time. However, he's too badly damaged from the battle, and knowing that he won't live to see it, Sunstar blows himself up, sacrificing his life to destroy the Wily Star as a way to help Mega Man achieve his goal. Mega Man escapes using Rush. He walks through a field, pondering the recent events, when Wily makes one last, unsuccessful attack. The game ends with Mega Man chasing Wily off the screen.

== Gameplay ==
The player fires the Mega Arm at an enemy. A Super Game Boy border surrounds the screen.

The gameplay in Mega Man V is largely similar to other games in the Mega Man series. As the protagonist Mega Man, the player is presented with a set of action and platform-style levels to complete. Mega Man's primary weapon is his staple arm cannon. However, rather than being able to charge and fire a more powerful blast with the trademark Mega Buster, the Mega Arm is used in essentially the same manner. Charging up and releasing the firing button causes Mega Man's arm to detach, strike an enemy, and then reattach. Destroying the boss at the end of each stage adds its special weapon to Mega Man's arsenal for the rest of the game. As each boss is weak to specific weapon, the player is encouraged to complete some stages before others. These bosses are known in game as "Mercury", "Venus", "Mars", "Jupiter", "Saturn", "Uranus", "Neptune", and "Pluto", named after the first, second, fourth, and fifth through eighth planets in the Solar System. Pluto was, at the time the game was made, considered a planet, unlike from 2006 and onwards. Terra is named for the Latin word for Earth. Defeating some bosses will allow the player to access Mega Man's robot dog Rush, who can transform into useful "Coil" and "Jet" modes for easier stage navigation. Mega Man V also introduces Tango the cat, another robotic pet to help Mega Man. Like the bird Beat from previous installments in the series, Tango will appear on the screen when summoned to attack enemies, transforming into a buzzsaw and ricocheting around the room. As in Mega Man IV, the player can return to Dr. Light between stages to purchase items using "Power Chips (P-Chips)" scattered throughout the game.

Mega Man V breaks an established trend in the Mega Man games released on the Game Boy handheld. Prior to its release, games in the series on the system featured a set of four "Robot Masters" boss characters from their titular NES counterpart and a second set of four from the succeeding NES game in the series. Mega Man V instead features entirely original enemy characters with the Stardroids, who are all named after the planets in the Solar System: Neptune, Mercury, Venus, Mars, Pluto, Uranus, Jupiter, Saturn, and Terra (Earth).

== Development ==
Mega Man V was developed by the same third-party company that worked on three of the four previous Game Boy Mega Man games. According to Mega Man series artist Keiji Inafune, the fifth installment took the longest time to develop of all five of these titles. Inafune was responsible for the game's character designs after their initial concepts were devised. "When you have a theme to follow, it can make things easier and harder at the same time," Inafune recounted. "Especially with a theme as vague as space." He additionally recalled having "a lot of reservations" when designing the Stardroids. Tango was included as a support character not featured in the home console games; his name, like other characters in the series, is part of musical motif. Inafune, who always enjoyed working on animal support characters, was especially pleased to design Tango due to the artist's personal fondness for cats. Mega Man V is the final installment in the Game Boy line of games based on the original Mega Man series. Inafune stated, "In the end, I think we had a lot of fun working on this series". Mega Man V was developed with Super Game Boy support, which allows the game to be played with a custom color scheme and border on the Super Nintendo Entertainment System (SNES). It was one of the first games available with added support from the peripheral. It was also the last time the classic 8-bit Mega Man sprite was used for a game released on an 8-bit console, and last until Mega Man 9 in 2008.

== Reception and legacy ==
Reception

Aggregate score
Aggregator	Score
GameRankings	75.83%

Review scores
Publication	Score
Electronic Gaming Monthly	7/10, 8/10, 7/10, 8/10, 8/10
Famitsu	6/10, 5/10, 6/10, 5/10
GamePro	3.5/5
VG&CE	8/10

A number of critics have given Mega Man V positive reviews. Critics found very little change from previous installments in the series. All four reviewers in Famitsu said the games have only changed in terms of stage, structure and enemies with two of them only recommending the game to die-hard fans of the series. VideoGames summarized, "If you don't have a Mega Man game for your Game Boy, this one is a good as any. It's entertaining...it's Mega Man. If you're thinking 'rehash', you might be right and it's still a pretty fun game, though." Nintendo Power was impressed by its gameplay and graphics, but felt that the game is too short, "especially when you sit down with the Super Game Boy and cruise". GamePro was contrastingly unimpressed with the controls on the SNES, considering the use of Game Boy much simpler.

In 2008, Nintendo Power listed Mega Man V as the 14th best Game Boy or Game Boy Color video game, praising it as the best of a quality series of portable Mega Man games. Game Informer's Ben Reeves called it the 11th best Game Boy game due to its relative ambition compared to its Game Boy predecessors. Mega Man V was available for the similarly named Nintendo Power cartridge service in Japan on April 13, 2001 alongside its four Game Boy Mega Man predecessors. Outside Japan, the game is considered to be quite rare. Capcom had planned to release a full-color compilation of all five Game Boy games on the Game Boy Advance in 2004, but the project was cancelled. In 2011, IGN listed the game among titles they wished to see downloadable from the Nintendo eShop for Nintendo 3DS. Mega Man V was released on the Nintendo 3DS' Virtual Console on November 6, 2013 in Japan, on May 22, 2014 in North America and PAL regions the following year. It was also released on the Nintendo Classics service for the Nintendo Switch with its predecessors on June 7, 2024.
