= Mega Man III (1992 video game) =

Action-platform video game

- North American cover art
- Developer: Minakuchi Engineering
- Publisher: Capcom: EU: Nintendo
- Producer: Tokuro Fujiwara
- Artist: Keiji Inafune
- Composer: Kouji Murata
- Series: Mega Man
- Platform: Game Boy
- Release: JP: December 11, 1992; NA: December 1992; EU: June 19, 1993
- Genre: Platform
- Mode: Single-player

Mega Man III (Note: Known in Japan as Rockman World 3 (Japanese: ロックマンワールド3, Hepburn: Rokkuman Wārudo Surī)) is a 1992 platform game developed by Minakuchi Engineering and published by Capcom for the Game Boy. It is the third game in the handheld series of the Mega Man franchise and the last to be published by Nintendo in Europe. The game follows the title character Mega Man as he fights the evil Dr. Wily. Along with foes from his past, Mega Man must contend with the next robot in Wily's line of "Mega Man Killers", Punk.

Like its two consecutive predecessors on the Game Boy, the game combines elements from two previously released Nintendo Entertainment System (NES) titles: Mega Man 3 and Mega Man 4. The game received positive reviews from critics and was considered a notable improvement over its predecessors, though some criticized it for being too difficult, deeming its difficulty level overly frustrating.

== Plot ==
The story of Mega Man III consists of the hero Mega Man battling the evil scientist Dr. Wily, but is different from version to version: in the US manual, Wily using a converted oil platform in the middle of the ocean to draw energy from the Earth's core to power a new machine. The plot of the Japanese version the game, supported by supplementary material, has Dr. Light's laboratory receiving many bad news reports from all over the world, from industrial anormalities to transportation failures and abnormal weather conditions, and an army of robots had gone crazy. Light finds out that the supercomputer that manages people's everyday life is malfunctioning and was tampered with by Dr. Wily via jamming waves, so he sends Mega Man, Rush, and Eddie to find him and stop him.

Mega Man defeats four of Dr. Wily's old Robot Masters, Gemini Man, Snake Man, Spark Man and Shadow Man, and after taking them out, he enters Wily's castle, where he has to fight four of the Robot Masters created by Dr. Cossack, the Russian scientist who Wily had blackmailed earlier: Drill Man, Dust Man, Dive Man and Skull Man.

After defeating the second set of Robot Masters, Mega Man finds Dr. Wily attempting to escape. A powerful robot designed specifically to destroy the hero, Punk, confronts him, but after a tough battle, Mega Man is able to defeat him. Wily's fortress emerges from the ocean and Mega Man heads in there, defeating him once again.

== Gameplay ==
The game combines elements from the NES games Mega Man 3 and Mega Man 4. Shown here is Snake Man's stage.

Mega Man III shares the action and platform gameplay set forth the NES Mega Man games. The player is able to choose between four stages that are immediately available. Mega Man's primary method of attack is his "Mega Buster", which can fire an unlimited number of small shots or can be charged by holding the down the button and then releasing a larger and more powerful blast. Beating the Robot Master boss at the end of each stage allows the player to add its unique weapon to Mega Man's arsenal.

The player can also gain access to Mega Man's dog Rush, who can transform into a "Coil" mode to let the player jump higher or a "Jet" mode for flying large distances across the screen. Another companion robot, Eddie, will appear in certain stages to randomly lend the player health, weapon power, extra lives, or storable Energy Tanks for completely refilling health. Mega Man III features four Robot Master adversaries from Mega Man 3 (Snake Man, Shadow Man, Spark Man, and Gemini Man) and four from Mega Man 4 (Dive Man, Drill Man, Skull Man, and Dust Man).

== Development ==
Series contributor Keiji Inafune stated Capcom outsourced the development of Mega Man III (known in Japan as Rockman World 3) and the rest of the Game Boy titles to the same company that worked on Mega Man: Dr. Wily's Revenge due to a bad experience with the one that worked on Mega Man II. "I decided to look at World 3 as a fresh new start, and I remember digging into it with renewed zest," Inafune claimed. "Punk, in particular, was a favorite of mine and I used my sway as the producer to have him included in Mega Man Battle Network."

== Reception and legacy ==
Reception

Aggregate score
Aggregator	Score
GameRankings	82.67%

Review scores
Publication	Score
AllGame	3.5/5
Electronic Gaming Monthly	8/10, 8/10, 9/10, 7/10
Famitsu	21 out of 40
Official Nintendo Magazine	7.2 out of 10

Mega Man III was given a positive review from the North American Electronic Gaming Monthly, which noted its use of familiar gameplay and a large amount of visual detail. In contrast, the United Kingdom's Nintendo Magazine System called it "a prime example of flogging a dead horse. Not really bad, but made unplayable by the sheer frustration level." Power Unlimited gave a score of 85% summarizing: "Of all the game series, the Megaman games are probably the most similar. The funny thing is that despite that, they are all very fun. You have to decide for yourself whether you keep playing them or whether you get bored with them."

The editors of GameSpot consider Mega Man III a rare find because it was never re-released in budget form likes the two games before it. Mega Man III was made available on March 13, 2001, for the Nintendo Power cartridge service in Japan alongside the other four Game Boy Mega Man games. Capcom had planned to release a full-color compilation of all five Game Boy games on the Game Boy Advance in 2004, but the project was cancelled. A redesign of Punk was featured in the spin-off game Mega Man Battle Network 3. A stage featuring the boss Punk was part of the downloadable content for Mega Man 10 in 2010. In 2013, Mega Man III was made available on the Virtual Console of Japan's Nintendo eShop for the Nintendo 3DS on October 9, 2013, in Japan, in North America on May 8, 2014, and in PAL regions on August 14, 2014. It was also released on the Nintendo Classics service for the Nintendo Switch with its predecessors and sequels on June 7, 2024.
