= Mega Man: The Wily Wars =

1994 video game

- PAL cover art
- Developer: Minakuchi Engineering
- Publisher: Capcom
- Artist: Keiji Inafune
- Composer: Kinuyo Yamashita
- Series: Mega Man
- Platform: Mega Drive/Genesis
- Release: JP: October 21, 1994; NA: December 1994 (Sega Channel); PAL: April 1995
- Genre: Platform
- Mode: Single-player

Mega Man: The Wily Wars (Note: Japanese: ロックマンメガワールド, Hepburn: Rokkuman Mega Wārudo; lit. 'Rockman Mega World') is a 1994 platform game compilation developed by Minakuchi Engineering and published by Capcom for the Sega Genesis; the compilation features remakes of the first three Mega Man games which were originally released on the Nintendo Entertainment System, alongside a new game called Wily Tower, only unlockable with a completed save file.

The Wily Wars saw a physical release in Japan and Europe, while the physical North American release was cancelled, with it only releasing as part of the Sega Channel service. In 2019, The Wily Wars was one of 42 games included in the Sega Genesis Mini and in 2021 got a physical re-release on cartridge, North America included, by the company Retro-Bit. On June 30, 2022, The Wily Wars was added to the Nintendo Classics service. Reviews have been generally positive.

== Plot ==
After being defeated by Mega Man for the third time, the evil Dr. Wily has built a Time Machine to travel back in time in an attempt to change the past and defeat the robotic hero Mega Man in one of their first three conflicts. Each game follows Mega Man reliving his past adventures in which Wily dispatches a set of powerful robots to take over the world which must be single-handedly stopped as before. After completing his travels through time, Mega Man must use all he has learned to tackle the Wily Tower.

== Gameplay ==
The player battles Quick Man in Mega Man 2.

All three games have the player control Mega Man through a series of platform stages which can be completed in any order. At the end of each stage is a boss battle with a Robot Master. The player will acquire that Robot Master's special weapon, which can then be selected and used throughout the rest of the game. Each game also features one or more support items that aid the player in reaching places the player cannot reach by normal means. Each Master Weapon and support item has limited energy that can be replenished by picking up items left by fallen enemies.

The compilation features an upgrade to the original games' visuals, as well as arranged music. An important change is that the compilation provides battery back-up for each game. As a result, it is possible to continue the original Mega Man from a later point in the game, though Mega Man 2 and Mega Man 3 lost the password feature because of this. The Wily Wars removes several glitches present in the NES versions of the game. Upon completion of all three games, an exclusive game mode, called "Wily Tower", is made available to the player. In Wily Tower, Mega Man travels through three different stages fighting against a trio of new bosses called the "Genesis Unit", which are based on characters from the Great Classical Novel Journey to the West: Buster Rod.G (Sun Wukong), Mega Water.S (Sha Wujing), and Hyper Storm.H (Zhu Bajie). After they are defeated, the player finally faces Wily in the titular tower. Wily Tower requires the player to equip Mega Man with eight weapons and three support items from any of the three main games to proceed.

== Development ==
Artist Keiji Inafune claimed that the development of Mega Man: The Wily Wars was outsourced and rather slowgoing. He described the debugging procedure for The Wily Wars as "an absolute nightmare", even helping out in the process himself. "It was so bad," he recalled, "I found myself saying, 'I can't believe we've made it out of there alive.'" Inafune based his designs of the three new Wily Tower bosses on characters from the ancient Chinese novel Journey to the West. Other than these characters, Inafune's only other illustrative contribution to the game was the depiction of Mega Man and Rush on the cover art. The soundtrack of The Wily Wars consists of 16-bit versions of the original Mega Man musical scores, as well as new songs for the Wily Tower portion of the game. The composer for the Wily Wars has not been officially credited by Capcom. According to the game's sound effects creator Kouji Murata, Kinuyo Yamashita was responsible for the music composition and arrangement.

== Release ==
Following the success of Street Fighter II: Champion Edition on the Mega Drive/Genesis, rumors began circulating in the United States that a Mega Man game was in the works for Sega's 16-bit system, the Sega Genesis. The Wily Wars was displayed by Sega of America at the Sega Summit sales meeting in May of that same year. The Wily Wars was first released in Japan on October 21, 1994. It was the first Mega Man game to be released on a non-Nintendo console. Game Players reported in its October issue that the North American release of The Wily Wars was put on hold indefinitely due to graphical problems. The April 1996 issue of GamePro reported that it had been cancelled. However, the game was released in a non-cartridge format on the Sega Channel, a paid subscription service for Genesis games.

In 2012, Mega Man: The Wily Wars was included on the "Ultimate Portable Game Player" compilation, a portable device with 80 built-in Sega Genesis games. On May 16, 2019, Sega announced that Mega Man: The Wily Wars would be re-released as one of the games included in the Sega Genesis Mini. In August that same year, Retro-Bit teased a licensed physical cartridge reproduction of the game, with this being the first time the game was officially released in North America in cartridge form. It would later get formally revealed on May 19, 2021, as Mega Man: The Wily Wars - Collector's Edition, with preorders opening two days later. The Retro-Bit version has less slowdown than the original.

On June 30, 2022, Mega Man: The Wily Wars was re-released on the Nintendo Classics service.

== Reception ==
Reception

Review scores
Publication	Score
Beep! MegaDrive	5.75/10
Consoles +	76%
Famitsu	7/10, 5/10, 7/10, 5/10
Hyper	86%
M! Games	76%
Mean Machines Sega	78/100
Mega Fun	75%
Player One	89%
Super Game Power	4/5
Video Games (DE)	76%
Computer+Videogiochi	89/100
Playy Time	75%
Sega MegaZone	69%
Sega Pro	67%
Top Consoles	14/20

The Japanese publication Micom BASIC Magazine ranked the game fifth in popularity in its January 1995 issue, and it received a 6.3125/10 score in a 1995 readers' poll conducted by the Japanese Sega Saturn Magazine, ranking among Sega Mega Drive titles at the number 358 spot. Mega Man: The Wily Wars received generally favorable reviews from critics.

Christian Nutt and Justin Speer of GameSpot stated that The Wily Wars is "a must for any serious Mega Man fan". Jeremy Parrish of 1Up.com labeled the game as "Not Worth It!" because certain design issues prevent it from aging as well as the NES versions of the games. The Wily Wars consistently ranked high among Nintendo Power editors as a game they would have liked to see on the Wii Virtual Console.
