= Mega Man: Dr. Wily's Revenge =

1991 video game

- North American cover art
- Developer: Minakuchi Engineering
- Publisher: Capcom: EU: Nintendo
- Producer: Tokuro Fujiwara
- Designer: Masashi Kato
- Programmer: Masatsugu Shinohara
- Artists: Keiji Inafune; Hayato Kaji; Miki Kijima; Etsuko Taniguchi
- Composer: Makoto Tomozawa
- Series: Mega Man
- Platform: Game Boy
- Release: JP: July 26, 1991; NA: December 1991; EU: 1992
- Genre: Platform
- Mode: Single-player

Mega Man: Dr. Wily's Revenge, also known as Mega Man in Dr. Wily's Revenge or in Japan as Rockman World (Note: Known in Japan as Rockman World (Japanese: ロックマンワールド, Hepburn: Rokkuman Wārudo)) is a platform game developed by Minakuchi Engineering and published by Capcom for the Game Boy. It is the first game in the handheld series of the Mega Man franchise. It was released in Japan on July 26, 1991, and was localized in North America that December and in Europe the following year. The game continues the adventures of the android hero Mega Man as he once again confronts the evil Dr. Wily, who has dispatched his revived "Robot Masters" and a new "Mega Man Killer" named Enker.

Dr. Wily's Revenge is an action and platform game in the same vein as the Nintendo Entertainment System (NES) Mega Man games. The player is tasked with completing a series of four stages in any order desired. Beating a stage's boss will earn the player a special weapon that can be selected at will and used throughout the rest of the game. Dr. Wily's Revenge specifically takes components of the original Mega Man and Mega Man 2, including their enemies, stage aesthetics, and Robot Masters.

According to series artist Keiji Inafune, Dr. Wily's Revenge was the first Mega Man game to be outsourced to a developer separate from Capcom. Critical reception for the game has been favorable, and most sources have denoted it as a competent portable version of the popular NES series, though it was criticized for its high difficulty and lack of checkpoints. Dr. Wily's Revenge was a best-seller and spawned four sequels of its own on the Game Boy, many of which follow its trend of reusing elements from their home console counterparts.

== Plot ==
Set in the 21st century ("200X"), Mega Man: Dr. Wily's Revenge follows the storyline of the original Mega Man series. The titular protagonist Mega Man, a super robot created by the benevolent Dr. Light, has restored peace to the world by halting the plans of the evil Dr. Wily and his powerful "Robot Masters". In Dr. Wily's Revenge, the mad scientist returns to send eight of his old Robot Masters to contend with the hero once again. After vanquishing four of the Robot Masters, Mega Man heads to Wily's fortress and deals with the remaining half of them. The protagonist then battles a new robot designed solely for destroying him, the "Mega Man Killer" Enker. As Mega Man defeats Enker and obtains his Mirror Buster ability, Wily retreats to a space station. Mega Man gives chase and, using the Mirror Buster, destroys Wily's newly built, final weapon. After putting a stop to his nemesis once again, Mega Man travels back home via space shuttle.

== Gameplay ==
Mega Man shoots an enemy in Fire Man's stage. The player's health and number of lives are shown at the bottom.

Mega Man: Dr. Wily's Revenge is an action-platformer that shares many similarities with its NES counterparts. The player, as Mega Man, is able to choose among four stages to complete in whatever order desired. Each stage contains various enemies to blast through and obstacles to overcome, such as leaping between disappearing blocks over deadly spikes and bottomless pits. Mega Man's primary weapon is an arm cannon that has unlimited ammunition. Destroyed enemies typically leave items that replenish Mega Man's health or extra lives. At the end of every stage is a boss battle with a robot master, and defeating it earns the player its special weapon. Each boss is weak to another's weapon, allowing the player to strategize the order in which they are beaten.

Dr. Wily's Revenge reuses and mixes stage components, enemies, and robot masters from the first two NES games in the Mega Man series. The initial four stages and bosses (Cut Man, Ice Man, Fire Man, and Elec Man) come from the original Mega Man. A password system allows the player to return to the game after any or all of these first four stages are cleared or when the player suffers a game over. Once the player completes these stages and travels through Wily's fortress, four more robot masters must be fought in order to progress. These bosses (Quick Man, Bubble Man, Flash Man, and Heat Man) are taken from Mega Man 2 for NES. Although they do not have their own stages, the player earns the special weapons of these bosses. Once all four are defeated, the player faces a new robot master created for the game, Enker.

== Development ==
According to series artist and producer Keiji Inafune, Mega Man: Dr. Wily's Revenge was the first Mega Man game to be outsourced by Capcom for its development. He felt the game turned out well because the project's leader was a "huge Mega Man fan" who appeared to understand the games better than some of Capcom's own people. Because he thought much of his artwork from the original Mega Man was not aging well, Inafune redrew many of his old illustrations to be used for the game's enemy character sprites. Beginning with Mega Man 2 for the NES, Capcom began accepting boss ideas from fans. It was not until Dr. Wily's Revenge that Inafune was able to design a boss character from scratch. To keep with the musical motif of naming characters, the new character Enker was named after the Japanese genre enka.

The decision to release a Game Boy incarnation of the Mega Man series came after the release of Mega Man 3 on the NES. Early reports of Dr. Wily's Revenge were made in February 1991 in both the magazine GamePro and Steven A. Schwartz's book The Official Guide to Mega Man. The North American version of this game and the first DOS Mega Man game share a similar cover art. Instead of being an all new illustration, the Dr. Wily's Revenge North American artwork is a simple touch-up of Mega Man 3's regional cover, with the surrounding landscape and robot masters cropped out of the picture.

== Reception and legacy ==
Reception

Aggregate score
Aggregator	Score
GameRankings	69%

Review scores
Publication	Score
AllGame	3/5
Electronic Gaming Monthly	8/10, 9/10, 9/10, 8/10
Famitsu	7/10, 6/10, 7/10, 6/10
IGN	7.5/10

General critical reception for Mega Man: Dr. Wily's Revenge has been above average, a popular opinion being that the game retains the respectable run-and-gun gameplay of the earliest NES entries in the series. "What makes this game especially attractive to adults," proclaimed Entertainment Weekly's Bob Strauss, "is that you can begin your quest on any one of four stages, thus avoiding that linear, start-over-again-from-scratch quality that only 12-year-olds find hypnotic." The use of old stages and bosses has not been universally positive. GamePro was disappointed by the game's lack of originality but preferred its use of recycled content to poorly made new content. In a 2007, retrospective of the Mega Man franchise, 1UP.com writer Jeremy Parish found the use of rehashed details acceptable for its original release, but believed that Dr. Wily's Revenge "hasn't really held up".

Reviewers have also commented on the game's high difficulty level. Craig Skistimas of ScrewAttack stated that certain parts of the game simply require one to have played before in order to succeed. AllGame contributor Colin Williamson noted the game as extremely hard due to its "pixel-perfect jumps", the "sheer number of attackers and flying bullets", and a lack of checkpoints within each stage. IGN editor Lucas M. Thomas pointed out that the large size of the player character within the small Game Boy screen makes dodging enemy attacks overly challenging and sometimes impossible. He furthermore observed the difficulty to be compounded by a lack of helpful Energy Tanks introduced in the NES Mega Man sequels.

The readers of GamePro voted Dr. Wily's Revenge the best handheld game of 1991. Nintendo Power readers voted it the fifth-best Game Boy game of that year. In North America, Dr. Wily's Revenge was released under Nintendo's Player's Choice best-seller label in 1996. The game was followed by four sequels on the Game Boy, of which the first three similarly recycle content from the NES games. In Japan, the game was made available on the Nintendo Power cartridge service on March 13, 2001. Capcom had planned to release a full-color compilation of all five Game Boy games on the Game Boy Advance in 2004, but the project was cancelled. In 2011, Dr. Wily's Revenge was released as a Virtual Console launch title on the Nintendo eShop for the Nintendo 3DS in Japan and internationally the same year. It was also released on the Nintendo Classics service for the Nintendo Switch with its sequels on June 7, 2024.

The character Enker, who debuted in Dr. Wily's Revenge, appeared as a boss in the Game Boy game Mega Man V and as a playable character in the Super Nintendo Entertainment System game Mega Man Soccer. A downloadable stage in Mega Man 10 features Enker as its boss and his Mirror Buster weapon as the reward for beating him.
