= Mega Man IV (1993 video game) =

Action-platform video game

- North American cover art
- Developer: Minakuchi Engineering
- Publisher: Capcom
- Producer: Tokuro Fujiwara
- Artist: Keiji Inafune
- Composer: Kouji Murata
- Series: Mega Man
- Platform: Game Boy
- Release: JP: October 29, 1993; NA: December 1993; EU: November 1995
- Genre: Platform
- Mode: Single-player

Mega Man IV (Note: Known in Japan as Rockman World 4 (Japanese: ロックマンワールド4, Hepburn: Rokkuman Wārudo Fō)) is a 1993 platform game developed by Minakuchi Engineering and published by Capcom for the Game Boy. It is the fourth game in the handheld series of the Mega Man franchise. The game continues the quest of the protagonist Mega Man in the struggle with his long-time nemesis Dr. Wily, who sends out a disruptive radio signal to cause a rampage, citywide destruction from dormant robots.

Mega Man IV features the traditional action platforming gameplay of the prior games while introducing one new feature, the ability to purchase items with power-ups found throughout each stage. As with previous Game Boy releases, the game incorporates gameplay elements and bosses from two sequential Nintendo Entertainment System (NES) games: Mega Man 4 and Mega Man 5. The game received positive reviews from critics, with significant praise for its improvements from its predecessors, though its low level of innovation was criticized.

== Plot ==
The plot of the game once again involves the protagonist Mega Man trying to thwart the world domination plans of the infamous Dr. Wily. On a seemingly peaceful day in a large city, Wily appears in the sky in his flying saucer and sends out a radio transmission that causes all the robots at the annual Robot Master Exposition to go on a rampage. He then sends eight new rebuilt robots of his own to different parts of the city to lead the destruction. Mega Man and his dog Rush aren't affected by the radio waves due to their strong sense of justice, but Beat, the robotic bird he got as a gift from Dr. Cossack, was incapacitated, losing four of his parts in the commotion. Having resisted this reprogramming signal, Mega Man leaves to fight and knocks out four Robot Masters that belonged to Dr. Cossack: Toad Man, Bright Man, Pharaoh Man and Ring Man. In the process, he locates Beat's parts so that he can be fixed and help him, and chases Wily to a large tank-like mobile base in the forest. Inside the base, the hero encounters Ballade, the third and latest Mega Man Killer and thus yet another robot specially designed to kill him. Mega Man defeats this new enemy and finds and defeats Crystal Man, Napalm Man, Stone Man and Charge Man, four of the Robot Masters that Dr. Wily had created and used in his scheme to frame Proto Man, who is now helping Mega Man from the sidelines. After returning to the base, he has a victorious rematch with Ballade, only to see Wily quickly retreat to his secret space battleship. Dr. Light fits Mega Man's companion Rush with a space flight ability, allowing the hero to lead a one-man assault on Wily's new stronghold. Mega Man beats Wily, but is unable to blast his way out of the exploding space station. At the last moment, Ballade, badly damaged from his two losses against him, appears and self-destructs in repentance, creating a hole through which Mega Man can safely escape.

== Gameplay ==
The player takes on the role of Mega Man as he traverses a series of two sets of selectable action-platforming stages in any order desired. The player's initial weapon, the "Mega Buster", can fire both small shots and much larger and more powerful, charged blasts. The charge shot works similarly to how it did in Mega Man 5, except that Mega Man doesn't lose the charge when he gets hit, but he will take a slight recoil, pushing him back a little when he fires the charge shot. Each stage is populated with various types of enemy robots and its Robot Master boss at the end. Beating the Robot Master will earn the player its special special weapon for use throughout the rest of the game. Clearing 2 of the Robot stages also gives the player access to abilities from Mega Man's dog Rush, who can transform into a springboard for reaching high platforms or a jet for crossing large hotizontal distances. Also, the game's first four Robot stages each house a letter ("B-E-A-T") that spell out the name of the bird Beat. Collecting all 4 letters endows the player the ability to summon Beat to assist by attacking enemies. On the other hand, the game's latter four Robot stages each house letters that spell ("W-I-L-Y") which would be mandatory to collect in order to enter deeper in the fortress for the rematch with Ballade and then the Wily Battleship at the end of the game. In one stage of the second half of the game, a path leads to Eddie, who will give Mega Man a random item when he enters the room he is in. Some stages of this portion of the game also contain hidden passages where the character Proto Man leaves the player a random item, like Energy Tanks or a special item that refills all weapon energy and health.

Mega Man IV carries on the Game Boy line's tradition of recycling elements from two consecutive Mega Man NES releases, most prominently with its bosses. The first four Robot Masters (Toad Man, Bright Man, Pharaoh Man, and Ring Man) are originally from Mega Man 4 and the latter four (Crystal Man, Napalm Man, Stone Man, and Charge Man) are from Mega Man 5. Mega Man IV also introduces a shop feature to the series. In addition to various restorative items like health, weapon power, extra lives, energy tanks that can be stored for later use, the player can pick up "Power Chips (P-Chips)" dropped by enemies or in designated spots in the stages. Dr. Light's lab can also be visited after a Game Over or after completing a stage, and here, the player can use the collected P-Chips to buy items that Dr. Light will create with a machine in exchange for a certain amount of chips. One such item is the newly introduced "Auto Charger" (or "Energy Balancer", which was originally conceived for Mega Man 5 but removed), which automatically takes weapon energy capsules and restores it in the weapon with the least amount of energy left, provided that there is no refillable special weapon selected.

Also, for the first time in the Mega Man Game Boy series, the boss rush against the Robot Masters (where Mega Man must fight all 8 Robot Masters again in a teleportation hatch in Dr. Wily's castle) is implemented, as opposed to the previous three Mega Man Game Boy titles, where Mega Man fought Wily straight on after going through his station.

== Development ==
Using features from two previous NES titles, as well as some new elements, series artist Keiji Inafune was happy with the flow from Mega Man III to Mega Man IV. Inafune was also satisfied with how the Mega Man Killers Enker, Punk, and Ballade turned out. The artist had fun thinking up new ideas for Ballade's second form, which included the horns on his head turning up, larger bombs, and shades covering his eyes.

== Reception and legacy ==
Reception

Aggregate score
Aggregator	Score
GameRankings	73.83%

Review scores
Publication	Score
Electronic Gaming Monthly	8/10, 8/10, 7/10, 8/10
Famitsu	7/10, 6/10, 6/10, 6/10
Game Players	86%
Hippon Super!	7/10

Mega Man IV has been well-received critically. Major gaming magazines Nintendo Power and Game Players have called the graphics and gameplay "exceptional" and "terrific", although the former was disappointed by its few surprises. Electronic Gaming Monthly described Mega Man IV as one of the best Game Boy games to date, due to its near flawless recreation of the action and technique of the home console games and graphics which push the Game Boy hardware "to its limits and then some" (though they did complain of screen blurring). They also praised the music and the extremely long, challenging levels. Nintendo Power rated Mega Man IV the second best Game Boy game of 1993.

Mega Man IV was re-released on April 13, 2001 for the Nintendo Power cartridge service in Japan alongside its four Game Boy counterparts. Capcom had planned to release a full-color compilation of all five Game Boy games on the Game Boy Advance in 2004, but the project was cancelled. The boss Ballade would later appear as part of a downloadable content stage for Mega Man 10 in 2010. On July 18, 2013, it was confirmed that Mega Man IV was planned to release on the Nintendo 3DS's Virtual Console, which released in Japan on October 23, 2013 and on May 15, 2014 in North America. It was also released on the Nintendo Classics service for the Nintendo Switch with its predecessors and sequel on June 7, 2024.
