= Mega Man 10 =

2010 video game

- North American cover art variant by iam8bit, featuring exaggerated interpretations of the game's world and characters (Note: The artwork is a part of a larger triptych featuring alternate covers that were used for digital storefronts. The character Bass was later added to the complete piece to promote their addition to the game as a playable character via downloadable content.)
- Developers: Inti Creates; Capcom
- Publisher: Capcom
- Directors: Ryota Ito; Hayato Tsuru
- Producers: Takuya Aizu; Toyohiro Serita; Keiji Inafune; Hironobu Takeshita; Akiko Ito
- Designers: Satoru Nishizawa; Yuichiro Iida
- Programmer: Hirokazu Kawagishi
- Artist: Yūta Watanabe
- Composers: Ippo Yamada; Ryo Kawakami; Yu Shimoda; Hiroki Isogai; Manami Matsumae; Yasuaki Fujita
- Series: Mega Man
- Platforms: Wii, PlayStation 3, Xbox 360
- Release: March 1, 2010: Wii; NA: March 1, 2010; EU: March 5, 2010; JP: March 9, 2010 PlayStation 3; JP: March 9, 2010 NA & EU: March 11, 2010 Xbox 360 March 31, 2010
- Genre: Platform
- Mode: Single-player

Mega Man 10 (Note: Known in Japan as Rockman 10: Threat from Outer Space!! (ロックマン10 宇宙からの脅威!!, Rokkuman Ten: Uchū kara no Kyōi!!)) is a 2010 platform game developed by Inti Creates and published by Capcom for the Xbox 360, PlayStation 3, and Wii.

Set after the events of Mega Man 9 (2008), the game's plot follows the androids Mega Man and Proto Man as they attempt to recover a machine that can develop a cure for Roboenza, a virus that causes robots to malfunction and rebel. Following the gameplay formula established in prior series titles, 10 sees players traversing through a set of side-scrolling levels, either as Mega Man or Proto Man, where the goal is to defeat a boss to progress and, in the case of the first eight, obtain special weapons that can be used in situational combat. Many elements from its immediate predecessor, such as its graphical style inspired by Mega Man titles for the Nintendo Entertainment System, were retained for the sequel. Additionally, downloadable content was made available which granted access to additional levels and Bass as a playable character.

Following the positive critical response of Mega Man 9, Capcom decided to continue the style established by the game for its sequel. Upon its release, Mega Man 10 received positive reception from critics, but it was also criticized for having overly similar gameplay to prior series titles. The Mega Man series as a whole experienced an eight year long hiatus following 10's release due to fatigue from the game's reuse of 9's concepts and spin-off series titles released throughout the 2000s. A sequel, Mega Man 11, was released in 2018.

== Gameplay ==
DLC character Bass shoots diagonally at a Darspider in Blade Man's stage.

Mega Man 10 is a side-scrolling platform game following the gameplay formula established by prior Mega Man games. The player is initially tasked with completing an octet of levels, which can be completed in any order. Each of these 2D side-scrolling stages contains obstacles and traps to overcome and enemies to shoot. Various power-ups such as health and weapon ammunition can also be found or picked up from defeated enemies. The end of the stage presents a boss battle with a Robot Master. Victory over the boss will earn the player its special weapon, which can be used throughout the remainder of the game. An in-game shop allows the player to use screws picked up in the stages to buy extra lives, energy tanks for refilling health and weapon power, and other useful items.

At the start of Mega Man 10, the player is able to choose and play through the game as either Mega Man or Proto Man. Though the two characters play similarly, there are some fundamental differences. For example, unlike Mega Man, Proto Man is able to charge up his arm cannon for more powerful attacks, slide along the ground, and block small enemy shots with his shield. However, Proto Man takes twice the damage that Mega Man does, is knocked back twice as far when hit, and can only have two shots onscreen at a time versus Mega Man's three. Both characters have optional support abilities. Mega Man can call on his dog Rush to reach high platforms or traverse long distances in the air. Proto Man has the same capabilities in two generic support items.

Mega Man 10 includes several difficulty modes, which alters level layouts, enemy AI, and damage done to the player character. The game also includes a challenge mode where players can practice their skills in 88 mini-stages, which typically require the player to reach a goal or defeat an enemy. In April 2010, Capcom made downloadable content for Mega Man 10 available for purchase. This content includes a third playable character, three "Special Stages", and an endless stage. Like Mega Man and Proto Man, the third protagonist, Bass, has unique abilities. He has a rapid-fire arm cannon that can fire in several directions, but each shot does half the damage of one of Mega Man's shots, his shots cannot pass through walls, and he cannot move while shooting. He also has a dash maneuver for longer jumps and the ability to summon his wolf Treble to allow him to fly, provide him with power-ups, and save him from bottomless pits. The three Special Stages are based on levels in the Game Boy Mega Man entries and have bosses named "Mega Man Killers" from three of those games: Enker from Mega Man: Dr. Wily's Revenge, Punk from Mega Man III, and Ballade from Mega Man IV. Out of the three playable characters, only Mega Man is able to acquire their special weapons and use them in the main game.

When the game was later integrated as part of Mega Man Legacy Collection 2, all of the former downloadable content from the original release was included in the game. These newly incorporated sections are unlocked either by completing the game once or by entering the secret code at the Mega Man 10 title screen.

== Plot ==
A virus known as "Roboenza" suddenly begins infecting robots worldwide, causing those infected to malfunction and hamper human life. A month after the outbreak begins, the android Mega Man's sister Roll becomes afflicted with the virus and eight of the infected robots, dubbed "Robot Masters", go rouge and attempt to take over the world. Dr. Albert Wily, a prior nemesis of Mega Man and a brilliant robotics designer, comes to Mega Man for assistance in recovering a machine he created, which is capable of making a cure for the virus, from the Robot Masters. Mega Man agrees to help Wily and sets out to stop the eight robots alongside his brother Proto Man, who realizes the severity of the situation and decides to assist him.

Upon defeating four of the Robot Masters, the duo manage to recover Wily's machine which creates a prototype medicine for Roll. The duo then defeat the remaining four robots, afterwards however it is revealed that Mega Man has contracted Roboenza and that Wily created the virus, having only developed a cure to entice robots to work for his bidding. Roll ends up giving her prototype medicine to Mega Man, which cures him allowing himself to head to Wily's fortress with Proto Man to collect enough medicine for those infected. The duo storm Wily's stronghold and battle him in the fortress and his space station until coming out victorious. After the battle, Wily suddenly contracts an illness spurring the duo to take him to a hospital. A few days later Wily escapes, but leaves behind enough medicine to cure the rest of the infected robots.

== Development and release ==
The game was co-developed by Inti Creates and Capcom, who had also collaborated on the downloadable console game Mega Man 9 in 2008. Both games share "retro" 8-bit graphics and sound, resembling the first six games in the original Mega Man series for the NES. Producer Keiji Inafune, who was involved with nearly the entire franchise, stated that choosing such a "retro" style for Mega Man 9 was a huge, overwhelming success for the developers. The team decided that for the tenth installment, they should listen to both old-school gamers and former Mega Man players who have not recently played video games. Specifically, this meant adding the easy mode due to complaints about the extreme difficulty of Mega Man 9. The only challenge with creating the game, Inafune explained, was to meet the ever-increasing expectations that come with yet another installment. The box art for Mega Man 10 is a tribute to, and inspired by, that of the original Mega Man. The game was released as a digital title via Xbox Live Arcade, PlayStation Network (PSN) and WiiWare respectively.

=== Music ===
The game's soundtrack was composed and produced by Ippo Yamada, Ryo Kawakami, Hiroki Isogai, and Yu Shimoda. Various former composers in past installments in the main Mega Man series, returned to write single Robot Master themes for Mega Man 10, which included Manami Matsumae, Yasuaki Fujita, Minae Fujii, Mari Yamaguchi, Yuko Takehara, Makoto Tomozawa, Akari Kaida and Shusaku Uchiyama. According to Yamada, Mega Man 9 was developed as an spiritual successor to 1988's Mega Man 2, whereas Mega Man 10 is made up of "original pixel art and chip music, neither a remake nor a revival". Even the menu, game over, and get-a-weapon songs are new; the stage selection and stage clear jingles are the only two previously composed tracks included within the game. Two official soundtrack albums were released. Rockman 10 Original Soundtrack, which contains the original music from the game itself, was released in Japan by Inti Creates on March 24, 2010. A second album titled Rockman 10 Image Soundtrack, which contains remixes of the songs from the game, was released in Japan on April 30, 2010.

== Reception and legacy ==
Reception

Aggregate score
Aggregator	Score
Metacritic	WiiWare: 81/100; XBLA: 79/100; PSN: 78/100

Review scores
Publication	Score
1Up.com	B
GameSpot	8.0/10
IGN	8.5/10

Christian Svensson, Capcom's Senior Vice President of strategic planning and business development, stated that the company was pleased with the sales of Mega Man 10. The game has received generally favorable reviews, with aggregate Metacritic percentages of 81, 79, and 78 on WiiWare, XBLA, and PSN respectively. IGN's Colin Moriarty praised its gameplay, challenge mode, and the addition of Proto Man as a playable character, which he said adds more depth to the game. Moriarty expressed disappointment in its short length however, citing other games in the series with two ending castles (Mega Man 4 through Mega Man 6). 1UP.com's Jeremy Parish gave the game a B grade, calling it fun, but stating that it fails to capitalize its predecessor in a meaningful way, claiming overly similar gameplay, uninspiring level design, and forgettable music. The game was also given a physical release along with four other Capcom titles from different franchises in the Capcom Essentials Pack for PlayStation 3 and Xbox 360. Mega Man 10 was later released on the PlayStation 4, Xbox One, and PC as part of Mega Man Legacy Collection 2, which also made a slight change of allowing the player to unlock all of the former downloadable content without making any purchases. A digital version was later released on the Nintendo Switch in 2018.

Elements of the game were adapted into the Mega Man comic from Archie Comics, though the series went on indefinite hiatus before it could be fully adapted. Time travel stories in issues 20 and 55 involved Mega Man being shunted forward to the events of the game and Dr. Light experiencing a vision of them but not understanding the cause of so many Robot Masters going haywire.
