= Mega Man 9 =

2008 video game

- North American virtual artwork inspired by the US box art of Mega Man, designed by iam8bit
- Developers: Inti Creates; Capcom
- Publisher: Capcom
- Director: Hayato Tsuru
- Producers: Takuya Aizu; Keiji Inafune; Hironobu Takeshita
- Designers: Satoru Nishizawa; Ryota Ito; Satoshi Yazima
- Programmer: Shinichi Sema
- Artist: Yoshitaka Hatakeyama
- Composers: Ippo Yamada; Ryo Kawakami; Yu Shimoda; Hiroki Isogai
- Series: Mega Man
- Platforms: PlayStation 3, Wii, Xbox 360, mobile phone
- Release: September 22, 2008: WiiWare; NA: September 22, 2008; JP: September 24, 2008; PAL: September 26, 2008 PlayStation Network; NA: September 25, 2008; PAL: September 25, 2008; JP: June 24, 2009 Xbox Live Arcade; NA: October 1, 2008; PAL: October 1, 2008; JP: June 24, 2009 Mobile phones; JP: December 1, 2010
- Genre: Platform
- Mode: Single-player

Mega Man 9 (Note: known in Japan as Rockman 9: Yabou no Fukkatsu!! (ロックマン9: 野望(やぼう)の復活(ふっかつ)!!, Rokkuman 9: Yabou no Fukkatsu!!; lit. "Rockman 9: The Ambition's Revival!!")) is a 2008 platform game developed by Capcom and Inti Creates. It is the ninth numbered game in the original Mega Man series, and the first home console game in the series since Mega Man & Bass (1998). Mega Man 9 was the first game in the series not to have a physical release, and was initially released only on the downloadable gaming services WiiWare, PlayStation Network (PSN), and Xbox Live Arcade (XBLA). In June 2017, it was announced that Mega Man 9 and 10 would have a physical and digital release with their inclusion in Mega Man Legacy Collection 2 for PlayStation 4, Windows, and Xbox One, as well as the Nintendo Switch in May 2018.

Taking place during the early 21st century, Mega Man 9 continues the adventures of the android hero Mega Man. When destructive attacks by powerful robots begin occurring all over the world, Mega Man's creator, the good-hearted Dr. Light, who created these robots, is blamed and arrested, while Mega Man's arch enemy, the evil Dr. Wily, claims to be uninvolved in the incidents. It is up to Mega Man to stop the robots, find the truth behind their circumstances, prove his creator's innocence and reveal Wily's true intentions. Mega Man 9 uses the classic 2D side-scrolling gameplay on which the series is based. Using both action and platforming elements, the player must complete a series of eight initial stages in any order desired. Defeating each stage's "Robot Master" boss copies its unique weapon, which the player can select at will throughout the remainder of the game.

Although the game was developed for modern consoles, Mega Man 9 features familiar 8-bit visuals and audio similar to the Nintendo Entertainment System (NES) as a "retro" throwback to the earliest entries in the franchise. According to its producers Keiji Inafune and Hironobu Takeshita, the development team intentionally made the graphics, sound, and gameplay of Mega Man 9 as simple as possible to adhere to the likeness of the fan and critical favorite Mega Man 2 (1988). Mega Man 9 was a commercial success and received positive reviews, though some of its design choices were negatively received by critics, with criticism for its high difficulty, lack of creativity in the level design and graphics and the removal of some of Mega Man's moves from earlier games, namely the slide and the charge shot. The game's popularity prompted Capcom to create a sequel, Mega Man 10 (2010), which also utilizes a simple, 8-bit style.

== Plot ==
Like previous entries in the series, the fictional events of Mega Man 9 take place during the 21st century ("20XX"). Dr. Light, the creator of the world's greatest android hero Mega Man, is blamed when several old and outdated models of "Robot Masters" he created suddenly go on a destructive rampage. Mega Man's nemesis Dr. Wily has no apparent connection to it. After showing a news video of Light declaring planetary domination and Wily refusing to follow him as evidence, Wily announces that he needs monetary donations to his bank account to complete the robots he built to combat those of Dr. Light. Worried about the situation and suspicious of Dr. Wily, Mega Man vows to fight to prove his creator's innocence and expose Wily's true intentions. After Mega Man begins combating the eight Robot Masters—Concrete Man, Tornado Man, Splash Woman, Plug Man, Jewel Man, Hornet Man, Magma Man and Galaxy Man—Light is soon arrested. During the victory over the fourth Robot Master, a piece of scrap metal is left behind, revealing that the robots were past their expiration date and would have been scrapped for recycling. Mega Man eventually picks up the last Robot Master's memory chip, which is analyzed to reveal Dr. Wily vowing to help the robots survive this expiration date and ultimately reprogramming them. However, before the information can become public, Wily swoops in using his flying saucer and steals the chip.

Mega Man breaks into Wily's robot city, which is guarded by powerful robots Wily built with the crowd's donations. He then fights and defeats Wily, who immediately begs for forgiveness, but he doesn't fall for it, and with Rush's projector, reminds him of all his begging from all previous main Mega Man series games. Mega Man then discovers that Wily was responsible for arresting Dr. Light, and that Light has fallen ill. However, Mega Man's ally Proto Man comes in and warns the hero that it is a trap, stating that the seemingly ill scientist is a robot impostor previously used by Wily to make the initial news video. Mega Man then takes his chances with Light and the impostor shocks him; Wily escapes while he is disabled. When the fortress comes down on him, Proto Man returns quickly to save him. In the end, Dr. Light was proved innocent and the status quo is restored. The eight Robot Masters are rebuilt and given new functions working alongside Light and his other robots.

== Gameplay ==
Mega Man battles mini-boss Hanabiran in Hornet Man's stage. The game features the same graphics and gameplay of NES-era Mega Man games.

Mega Man 9 has been described as an action and platform game, in which the player controls the titular character and must complete a number of 2D side-scrolling stages. The start of the game presents a select screen of eight stages from which the player can choose to complete in any order desired. Within each stage, the player advances by running, jumping, avoiding traps, shooting enemies and mini-bosses, and ultimately battling the Robot Master boss at the end. Mega Man begins with a "Mega Buster" arm-cannon weapon, but as each boss is defeated, a unique weapon is added to his arsenal. Because each Robot Master is weak to a specific weapon, the player may strategize the order in which the stages are cleared. The player also begins the game with the option to call on Mega Man's dog Rush, who can transform into a "Coil" springboard for jumping higher or a "Jet" for traversing long distances in the air. Mega Man's health, his special weapons, and his Rush options are all limited by energy gauges that can be refilled by picking up items found throughout each level. Special screws can also be picked up and used to buy items at Auto's shop between stages. These items include extra lives, tanks that refill energy, and one-time-use items that call on Mega Man's companions Eddie and Beat for help.

Using the original Mega Man and Mega Man 2 as the main inspiration for the gameplay in Mega Man 9, several significant features from previous games were left out. Specifically, Mega Man lacks the ability to slide along the ground and the ability to charge up his Mega Buster for more powerful shots. Aside from using or omitting various elements from past games in the series, Mega Man 9 introduces a time attack mode and 50 optional challenges where certain requirements should be met to be accomplished. These range from defeating a boss using only the Mega Buster to clearing the entire game without taking any damage. Downloadable content for all three versions of the game was made available for purchase during October 2008. Proto Man can be downloaded as an alternate playable character. Proto Man is able to slide, can charge up his buster, and takes double the damage of Mega Man, among other differences. Additional downloadable add-ons include higher difficulty modes, an endless stage, and a special stage featuring a new boss, Fake Man. This downloadable content was included in Mega Man Legacy Collection 2, requiring the player to complete the game or enter a secret cheat code.

== Development ==
Mega Man 9 was co-developed by Capcom and Inti Creates. The latter company had developed the Mega Man Zero and Mega Man ZX spin-off series and employs many former Capcom members who worked on previous Mega Man games. The first six games in the original Mega Man series were created for the NES during the late 1980s and early 1990s. A plethora of spin-off series, related games, and compilations were published by Capcom as a result of the original series' immense popularity. The most recent entries in the main series, Mega Man 8 and Mega Man & Bass, were first released on more advanced home consoles in 1996 and 1998 respectively. Keiji Inafune, a designer, artist, and producer at Capcom, has been involved in most of franchise's development. As early as 2004, Inafune, credited as "Inafking", publicly expressed his desire to make a Mega Man 9 as a "throwback to the super old school", but that its creation would highly depend on the input of fans. According to Inafune, the simple fun of a classic Mega Man game "doesn't fit into the grandiose and expansive world that the consumer gaming industry has become, and so you have to make games that match the current expectations". He also believed that pushing for the creation of a Mega Man in the style of the original "would be quickly criticized for things like being simplistic, outdated, or too expensive", thus making it too difficult to develop such games in the current climate.

Inafune cited the rise of retrogaming services like Nintendo's Virtual Console for allowing the development team to put together Mega Man 9. Not only does the game carry the gameplay and storyline elements of older games, Mega Man 9 is a return to the series' roots, as the graphics and music resemble how their original games looked and sounded on the NES's 8-bit hardware. Inafune felt that the "time was right" for choosing this style of game to please its fans. Capcom's management was supportive in making Mega Man 9 downloadable, but they wanted the game to be 3D instead of 8-bit as they thought the latter would only appeal to Mega Man fans. The team additionally discussed giving players the option to choose between 8-bit and current generation styles. However, the idea for solely using 8-bit eventually won out. The staff was concerned with surpassing Mega Man 2 rather than Mega Man 8, as Mega Man 2 has been more praised. Producer Hironobu Takeshita referred to Mega Man 9 as "the new Mega Man 3" in this regard.

Mega Man 9's development team consisted of about 20 people. Takeshita explained that although Inti Creates used their previous experience to create the gameplay, the technical aspects, like the graphics and sound, were more difficult to fine-tune. As the team had a tendency to make these attributes complex, Inafune would often scold them to simplify their work and "bring it back to the basics". Rather than use NES technology, Mega Man 9 runs on a new, proprietary engine that simulates the behavior of 8-bit video games. The game includes a "Legacy Mode" option, which emulates the low video processing power of the NES by partially rendering sprites, thus causing them to flicker when too many are on screen simultaneously. The developers also considered distributing the game on NES cartridges, but without technology to bridge the gap between the cartridges and current gaming hardware, the idea was scrapped. Takeshita clarified that Mega Man 9 is much too large to actually fit on an NES cartridge.

Inafune designed both Plug Man and Splash Woman, while the artists at Inti Creates designed the remaining six Robot Masters. Plug Man was used as an example to guide the younger designers in making characters with simple yet unique features. The idea for Splash Woman, the first female Robot Master of the original series, was requested by the planning team. Hornet Man was originally conceived as another female Robot Master named "Honey Woman" before being changed to a male after Inafune presented his design of Splash Woman.

=== Audio ===
The musical score and sound effects for Mega Man 9 were composed by Ippo Yamada, Ryo Kawakami, Yu Shimoda, and Hiroki Isogai. Yamada, a veteran composer for Capcom at this point, worked "with a sense of nostalgia", while the younger designers had to study and imitate the older games. Sound director Yu Shimoda analyzed the audio of the NES Mega Man games for several months before beginning the project. Yamada insisted that the game contains no actual NES music, but rather the "spirit of NES music", as no such hardware restrictions were present as they had been during the development of the first six games. Most of the tracks were created with the quality of these past games in mind, but only a handful actually reference songs from previous games. Character and levels designs were "fundamental to the process of generating the music". Computers running Music Macro Language were used to produce the game's sound effects. Yamada explained that taking away the sound of charging up the Mega Buster allowed for many more sound waves that it would have obscured or blocked out on NES hardware. Still, as a spiritual successor to Mega Man 2, layers of background music were deliberately designed to drop out when simultaneously heard with certain sound effects as they did in that game.

== Release ==
Capcom officially announced Mega Man 9 during July 2008. Official details were first confirmed via the magazines Weekly Famitsu and Nintendo Power, revealing that the title would be appearing on the Nintendo Wii as a WiiWare title. It was initially slated to be exclusive to WiiWare, with earlier reports of Microsoft's XBLA and Sony's PSN editions being denied by Capcom. Gaming sites like IGN confirmed it for PSN and XBLA shortly thereafter. Various regions including North America, Japan, Europe, and Australia saw releases of the game between September 2008 and June 2009. A mobile phone incarnation of Mega Man 9 was also released in Japan in late 2010.

The North American promotional artwork for the game, designed by Gerald de Jesus of iam8bit, was meant to be reminiscent of the domestic cover art for the original Mega Man game. According to Capcom employee Chris Kramer, the marketing group felt that if they were going to release a game that graphically resembled one that came from 1987, it would be best to have the marketing campaign reflect that. T-shirts bearing the artwork were created for Inafune and Takeshita to wear at the game's official debut at the Electronic Entertainment Expo during the summer of 2008. The T-shirts were later made available to the public via Capcom's online store. A "limited edition" press kit, intended for members of the media, using that same cover art was then created by iam8bit. Being as faithful to the original 1987 release as possible, the iam8bit crew disassembled one-thousand vintage NES cartridges and inserted mini CDs inside. Though the CDs do not contain the actual game, they feature an array of screenshots, artwork, and game information. That was then packaged in a custom-created, classic-looking NES box, complete with shrink-wrap and bargain bin price tags. The press kit was also put on sale at Capcom's store.

To help promote the game in Japan, Capcom released merchandise including "E-Tank" energy drinks and two CD soundtracks. The Rockman 9 Original Soundtrack was released on September 12, 2008. The soundtrack, consisting of the game's 35 music tracks, includes a booklet with liner notes written by the Inti Creates sound team, as well as artwork and information on the eight Robot Masters. The Rockman 9 Arrange Album released on October 10, 2008, featuring remixes of the game's songs arranged by Yamada, his team, and several guest composers from past entries in the Mega Man series.

== Reception and legacy ==
Reception

Aggregate score
Aggregator	Score
Metacritic	PS3: 77/100; Wii: 83/100; Xbox 360: 82/100

Review scores
Publication	Score
1Up.com	B+
Edge	6/10
Eurogamer	8/10
GameSpot	8.5/10
IGN	8.6/10
Official Nintendo Magazine	90%
PlayStation Official Magazine – UK	5/10
Official Xbox Magazine (UK)	7.5/10

Mega Man 9 has received mostly positive reviews from gaming magazines and websites. The Wii, Xbox 360, and PlayStation 3 versions of the game currently hold aggregate percentages of 83, 82, and 77 respectively on Metacritic. 1UP.com gave the game a B+, praising its old-school aesthetic and challenge. IGN gave the game an 8.6/10, awarded it with an "Editor's Choice" award across all platforms, and praised it for "having some of the best level design in the series". The Official Nintendo Magazine gave the game 90% noting that "it will keep you busy for hours" and "screams retro". It did mark it down because "it might be too frustrating". However, Edge gave the game a score of six out of ten. The magazine responded positively to the game's enemy design, though criticized the game for trying to fit into the "retro cool category" and being not as good as the previous games.

The WiiWare version of Mega Man 9 has received additional recognition from various publications. In Nintendo Power's "Game of the Year" section, Mega Man 9 was scored as the best WiiWare game of 2008 by both readers and staff. It was nominated for "Best Platforming Game for the Wii" by IGN in its 2008 video game awards. It was also nominated for "Best Wii Game" and "Best Downloadable Console Game" on GameSpot's "Best of 2008". Gaming Target selected it as part of their "40 Games We'll Still Be Playing From 2008" feature. IGN has considered Mega Man 9 as one of the top 15 WiiWare games available. In 2011, IGN listed Mega Man 9 as the 5th-best WiiWare game and the 14th-best PSN game of all time.

Although no financial figures for Mega Man 9 have been released, Christian Svensson (Capcom's Vice President of Business Development) debunked all sales rumors shortly after its launch, stating that the company was "cautiously optimistic" about its performance on WiiWare. Both Svensson and Capcom's Seth Killian stated months later that the company was "definitely happy" with the sales of the game. Inafune also expressed his satisfaction with the game's success, proclaiming that it far exceeded their expectations. A follow-up game, Mega Man 10, was released in March 2010 for WiiWare, PSN, and XBLA. This sequel also features retro-style graphics, audio, and gameplay. Mega Man 9 was later released on the PlayStation 4, Xbox One, and PC as part of Mega Man Legacy Collection 2, which also made a slight change of allowing the player to unlock all of the former downloadable content.
