= Blip Festival =

Chiptune music festival

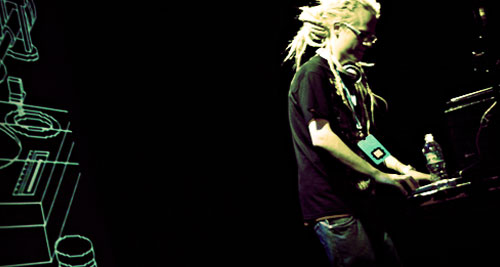
- Dubmood blipfestival 2008
- Genre: Chiptune
- Locations: New York City, Aalborg, Tokyo, Melbourne
- Years active: 2006 - 2012
- Website: www.blipfestival.org

The Blip Festival was a festival that celebrated chiptune music with musical performances, workshops, and screenings of movies. It was held annually starting in 2006 in New York City. In recent years, there have been international versions of Blip Festival held in Europe, Asia, and Australia. The festival is curated and organized by 8bitpeoples, one of the foremost labels in the chiptune scene, as well as local arts organization The Tank. The New York festival (referred to simply as Blip Festival) has switched venues several times, beginning in 2006 at 15 Nassau Street in Manhattan, then moving to Eyebeam Art and Technology Center in 2007, and then being held in Brooklyn at The Bell House in 2008 and 2009. It went back to Eyebeam in 2011 and then the Gramercy Theatre in 2012.

The festival was the subject of a 2008 documentary film, Reformat the Planet, made by 2 Player Productions. The documentary was an official selection of the 2008 South by Southwest Film Festival, and was shown on Pitchfork.tv.

After seven Years and 11 Festivals across four continents it was announced that the October 2012 Blip Festival in Tokyo would be the last installment.

== Blip Festival Europe ==
The Blip Festival Europe was held once only in Aalborg, Denmark on July 24 to 25, 2009. The festival included Bit Shifter, Nullsleep, minusbaby, Hally, Binärpilot, Goto80, Bodenständig 2000, Bu Bu Kitty Fuckers and more.

== Blip Festival Tokyo ==
The Blip Festival Tokyo occurred for three consecutive years and was held for the first time on September 4–5, 2010 in Tokyo, Japan at Koenji High. Artists that played included Goto80, Bit Shifter, Nullsleep, YMCK, Saitone, Hally, Quarta330, Stu, Hip Tanaka, and more. It was consecutively held at Koenji High on October 22–23, 2011 and October 20–21, 2012.

== Blip Festival Australia ==
The Blip Festival Australia was held for the first and only time on February 17–18, 2012 in Melbourne, Australia at Evelyn Hotel. Artists that played included Patric Catani, Bit Shifter, Nullsleep, Dot.AY, Abortifacient, Ten Thousand Free Men & Their Families, _ensnare_, 7bit Hero and more.

== Past lineups ==
=== 2012 lineup ===
- Batsly Adams
- Bit Shifter
- Burnkit2600
- CHiKA
- Chipocrite
- Chromacle
- :| kREW
- Danimal Cannon
- Deadbeatblast (music & visuals)
- Dr. Von Pnok
- Enso
- Exilefaker
- Flashheart
- George & Jonathan
- Graffiti Monsters
- Infinity Shred
- Kris Keyser
- Jean Y. Kim
- Kodek
- Mikrosopht & the p.irateship
- Minusbaby
- Misfitchris
- Monodeer
- No Carrier
- Nullsleep
- Omodaka
- Pulselooper
- Radlib
- Shitbird
- Wizwars
- Zen Albatross

=== 2011 lineup ===
- Anamanaguchi
- BEASTMODE
- Bit Shifter
- Bubblyfish
- Chipzel
- cTrix
- Deadbeatblast (visuals only)
- enso
- exileFaker
- 4mat
- Henry Homesweet
- Knife City
- Raquel Meyers
- minusbaby
- M7Kenji (visuals)
- NNNNNNNNNN
- No Carrier
- Noisewaves
- Nullsleep
- Party Time! Hexcellent! (visuals)
- Tristan Perich
- Ralp
- Stagediver
- Starscream
- Peter Swimm
- Talk To Animals
- Ten Thousand Free Men & Their Families
- Ultrasyd
- vade
- visualicious
- Wet Mango
- Zen Albatross

=== 2009 lineup ===
- Albino Ghost Monkey
- Bit Shifter
- Bubblyfish
- Patric Catani
- Chromix
- The C-Men (visuals)
- Disasterpeace
- Eat Rabbit
- enso (visuals)
- failotron
- Fighter X
- Glomag
- The Hunters (music and visuals)
- I, Cactus
- The J. Arthur Keenes Band
- Je Deviens DJ en Trois Jours
- Jean Y. Kim
- Leeni
- little-scale
- Rosa Menkman (visuals)
- minusbaby
- No Carrier (visuals)
- Nullsleep
- Outpt (visuals)
- Paris (visuals)
- Psilodump
- Rainbowdragoneyes
- Silent Requiem
- Starscream
- David Sugar
- tRasH cAn maN
- Vblank (visuals)

=== 2008 lineup ===
- Anamanaguchi
- Animal Style
- Bit Shifter
- Bubblyfish
- Cheap Dinosaurs
- Cow'p
- Dubmood
- Entter (visuals)
- Glomag
- Graffiti Monsters
- IAYD
- Ikuma
- Jellica
- Lissajou
- Low-Gain
- m-.-n
- Meneo
- minusbaby
- Mr. Spastic
- No Carrier (visuals)
- nordloef
- noteNdo (visuals)
- Nullsleep
- Paris Treantafeles (visuals)
- Role Model
- Sidabitball
- Starscream
- Stu
- Sulumi
- Syphus
- The C-Men (visuals)
- Tonylight
- Trash80
- Unicorn Dream Attack
- USK
- Vblank (visuals)
- zabutom

=== 2007 lineup ===
- 6955
- 8GB
- Alex Mauer
- Anamanaguchi
- Bit Shifter
- Bodenständig 2000
- Bokusatsu Shoujo Koubou
- Crazy Q
- Firebrand Boy
- Gijs Gieskes
- gwEm
- Lo-bat.
- Mark DeNardo
- Markus Schrodt
- minusbaby
- nrgiga
- No Carrier (visuals)
- noteNdo- (visuals)
- Nullsleep
- Oliver Wittchow
- Otro (visuals)
- Paza Rahm
- Postal_M@rket
- Rugar
- Sabrepulse
- Saskrotch
- Tree Wave
- virt
- Yes, Robot

=== 2006 lineup ===
- Anamanaguchi
- Goto80
- Receptors
- Starpause
- Touchboy
- Tugboat
- virt
- x|k
- Bit Shifter
- Coova
- Mark DeNardo
- Pepino
- Quarta330
- Rabato
- Random
- Herbert Weixelbaum
- Cory Arcangel
- Aonami
- Covox
- Crazy Q
- The Depreciation Guild
- Hally
- Kplecraft
- Bud Melvin
- Nullsleep
- Bubblyfish
- Glomag
- Tristan Perich
- Portalenz
- Saitone
- Jeroen Tel
- Neil Voss
- YMCK
- C-Men (visuals)
- C-TRL Labs (visuals)
- noteNdo (visuals)
- Voltage Controlled (visuals)
- Dan Winckler (visuals)

== See also ==
- List of electronic music festivals
- Live electronic music
