= Chipzel =

Northern Irish musician (born 1991)

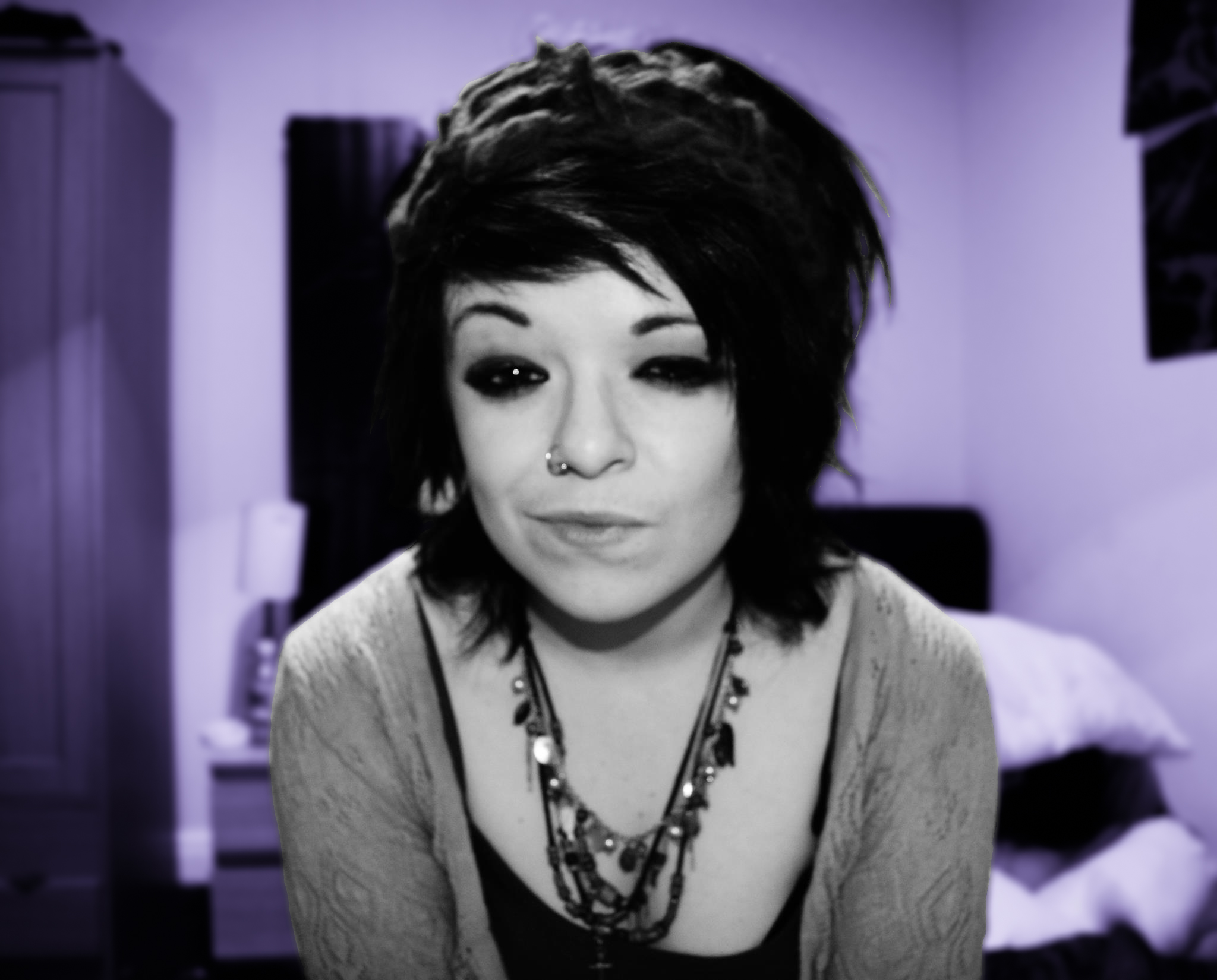
- Chipzel in 2012

Background information
- Birth name: Niamh Houston
- Born: 23 September 1991 (age 33); Strabane, Northern Ireland
- Genres: Chiptune, bitpop
- Occupation(s): Musician, composer, record producer
- Instrument: Game Boy
- Years active: 2009–present
- Labels: Brave Wave Productions; Materia Collective
- Website: chipzel.co.uk

Niamh Houston (born 23 September 1991), better known by her stage name Chipzel, is a musician from Northern Ireland. She is best known for making chiptune music, particularly with a Game Boy. She is also a video game music composer, and is known for the soundtracks of games such as Super Hexagon, Interstellaria, and Dicey Dungeons. Her music is also featured in other games such as Just Shapes and Beats and Spectra.

== Biography ==
=== Early life ===
Niamh Houston was born on 23 September 1991 in Strabane, Northern Ireland. When Houston was a child, her sister played several instruments and her father enjoyed Irish folk music.

=== Career ===
Around the year 2006, Houston began to discover chiptune artists such as Sabrepulse, inspiring her to start making her own music with Little Sound DJ on a Game Boy. She continued to explore chip music, and in 2009, she published her first release, an EP titled Judgement Day. She followed this in 2010 with her first album, Disconnected.

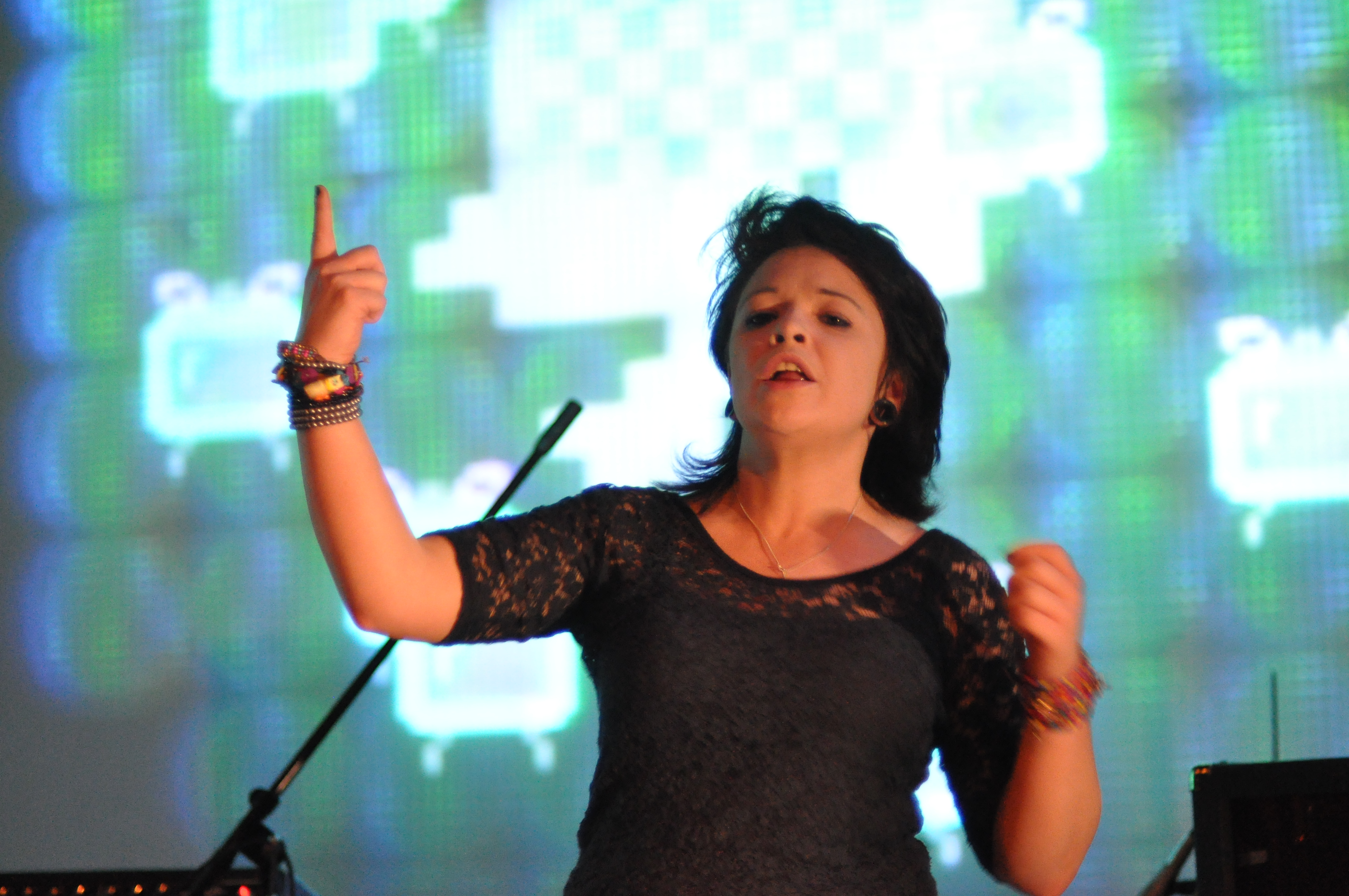
Chipzel performing at Blip Festival in 2011

In 2011, she performed at Blip Festival, a music event focused on chiptune. For live shows, Houston generally uses two Game Boys with tracker software connected to a DJ mixer.

In February 2012, she published her second album, Phonetic Symphony. Later that month, game developer Terry Cavanagh contacted Houston about using her music. Cavanagh was participating in Pirate Kart V, a game jam, and was making a game called Hexagon. Houston liked Cavanagh's project, and thus allowed him to publish Hexagon with her track "Courtesy." Several months later, Cavanagh asked Houston to make tracks for his new game Super Hexagon, an extended recreation of the original Hexagon. She again accepted, and the resulting Super Hexagon EP was published in September 2012, featuring "Courtesy" from the original game, the track "Focus" from Phonetic Symphony, and a new track called "Otis". Super Hexagon was very successful, receiving widespread praise for its design and music. The game's success drew much attention to Houston's work, and sparked an interest in creating more music for video games.

In October 2012, Houston published Fragments, a four-track EP which was released for free as "a massive thanks for all the support from Super Hexagon."

In September 2013, Houston released her album Spectra. Game developer Gateway Interactive approached Houston and proposed making a game based on the album. In early 2015 the game was released (also titled Spectra), a racing game published by Mastertronic Group.

Houston has continued to work on video game soundtracks, and worked over the following two years on the soundtrack for Interstellaria, a space-exploration and management game published by Chucklefish. The soundtrack and the game were both released on 17 July 2015.

In August 2015, Chipzel performed as the opening act at Dare ProtoPlay.

Chipzel worked with Terry Cavanagh again in 2019, creating the music and sound effects for his new game, Dicey Dungeons.

In May 2023, Houston became the host of the six-part BBC podcast 'Cheat Code: The Gaming and Tech Podcast'

== Discography ==
=== Albums ===
- 2009 – Judgement Day
- 2010 – Disconnected
- 2012 – Phonetic Symphony
- 2012 – Super Hexagon (soundtrack)
- 2012 – Fragments
- 2013 – Spectra
- 2013 – Monaco: The Gentleman's Private Collection (compilation)
- 2014 – Adventure Time: The Secret of the Nameless Kingdom (soundtrack)
- 2014 – Size Does Matter (soundtrack)
- 2015 – Chime Sharp (soundtrack)
- 2015 – Interstellaria (soundtrack)
- 2015 – Only Human
- 2017 – Chipped of the Necrodancer
- 2018 – Octahedron (soundtrack)
- 2019 – Dicey Dungeons (soundtrack)
- 2019 – River City Girls (soundtrack)
- 2019 – The Retro-Active Experience (compilation)
- 2019 - Cadence of Hyrule: Crypt of the NecroDancer Featuring The Legend of Zelda
- 2021 – Yellow Magic (soundtrack)
- 2022 – Dicey Dungeons: Reunion Original (soundtrack)

=== Other, featuring, remixed tracks ===
- "Just Dance" (Lady Gaga Remix)
- "Inspire Your Generation" (Preview)
- "22 TODAY YOLO ETC ETC"
- "Immerse"
- “Secret Level” (w/ No Mana)
