= Kärrgruvan =

Coordinates: 60.0964°N 15.9325°E

Kärrgruvan is the name of the northern part of the locality Norberg, located in Norberg Municipality in northwestern Västmanland, Sweden. The locality is mainly famous for its history of industrial mining which lasted for more than 800 years.

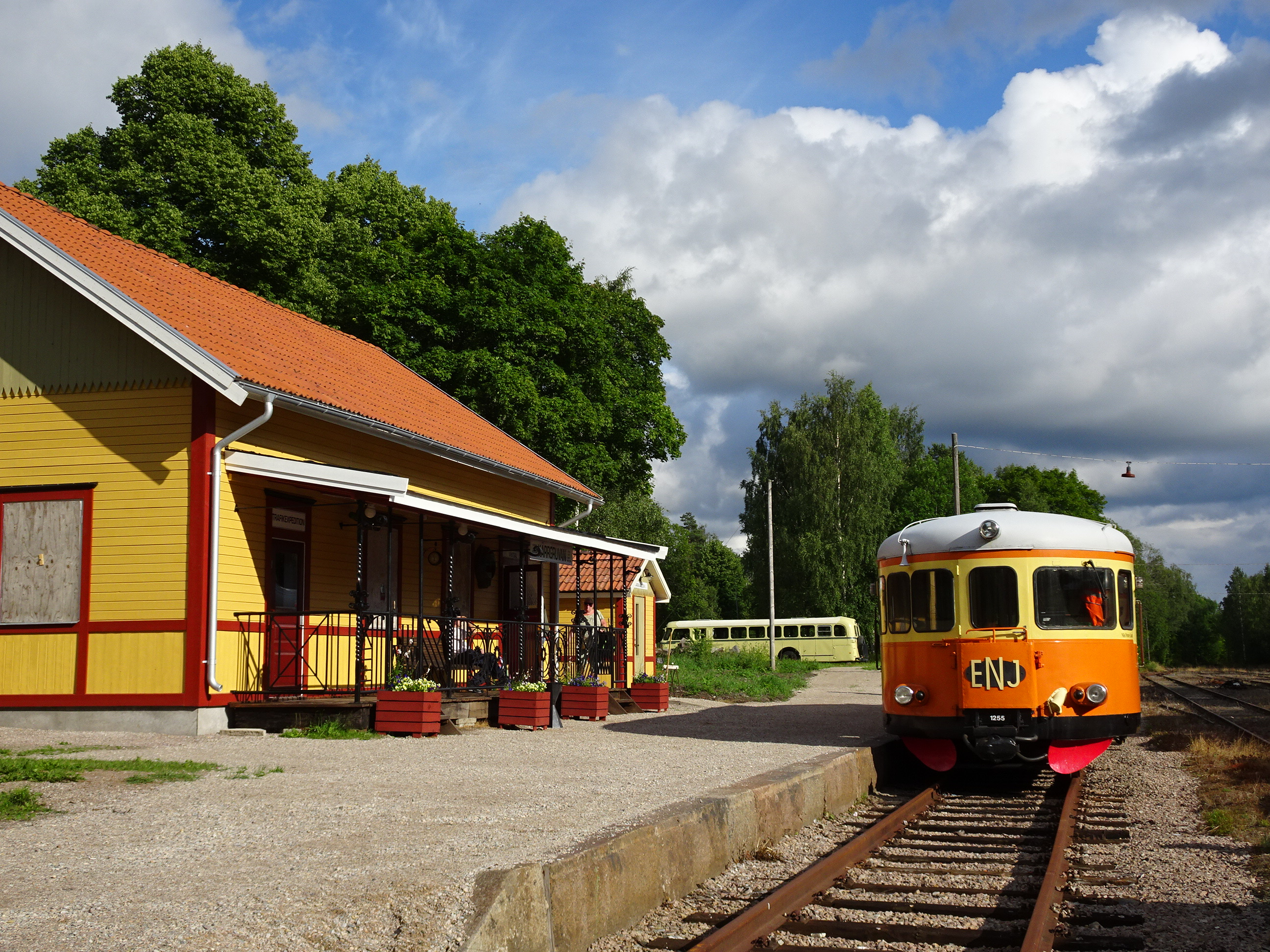
Kärrgruvan's railway station, nowadays exclusively used for railbuses

== Etymology ==
Just like in many other parts of Norberg, Kärrgruvan has quite many open-pit mines in the nature. The name Kärrgruvan comes from a small open-pit mine with the same name and can be translated as "the marsh mine" or "the swamp mine".

== The locality ==
Most of the houses and buildings in Kärrgruvan are located along highway 69 (actually riksväg 69, also known as Hedemoravägen, former länsväg 270) towards Hedemora and along the road Linnévägen. Its centrum is where highway 69 and Linnévägen meet and consists of a pizzeria, a gas station and a nowadays disused grocery shop.

=== Signs of mining ===
Mossgruveparken is an abandoned mining area with deep, water-filled open-pit mines where iron ore was extracted until the beginning of the 20th century.

There is a mining museum in Kärrgruvan called Norbergs gruvmuseum. Under the museum there is a deep shaft used to bring water out of the mines. A waterwheel a couple of kilometers away from there, called Polhemshjulet, ran the pumps with a lever mechanism. Inside the museum visitors can be shown how the process worked. The museum also shows how the earliest method for extracting iron ore worked; to break the mountains by using gunpowder, nitroglycerine and dynamite. Drilling techniques, tools and machines for that are shown in the museum.

=== Habitation ===
If one includes the villages Kylsbo and Kallmora, Kärrgruvan has just below 1 000 inhabitants. This number has been about the same for the last 50 years. During the 1960s the majority of Kärrgruvan's population was settled in five apartment buildings, together called Bolagshagen, a rare and probably unique name which can be translated as The company pasture.

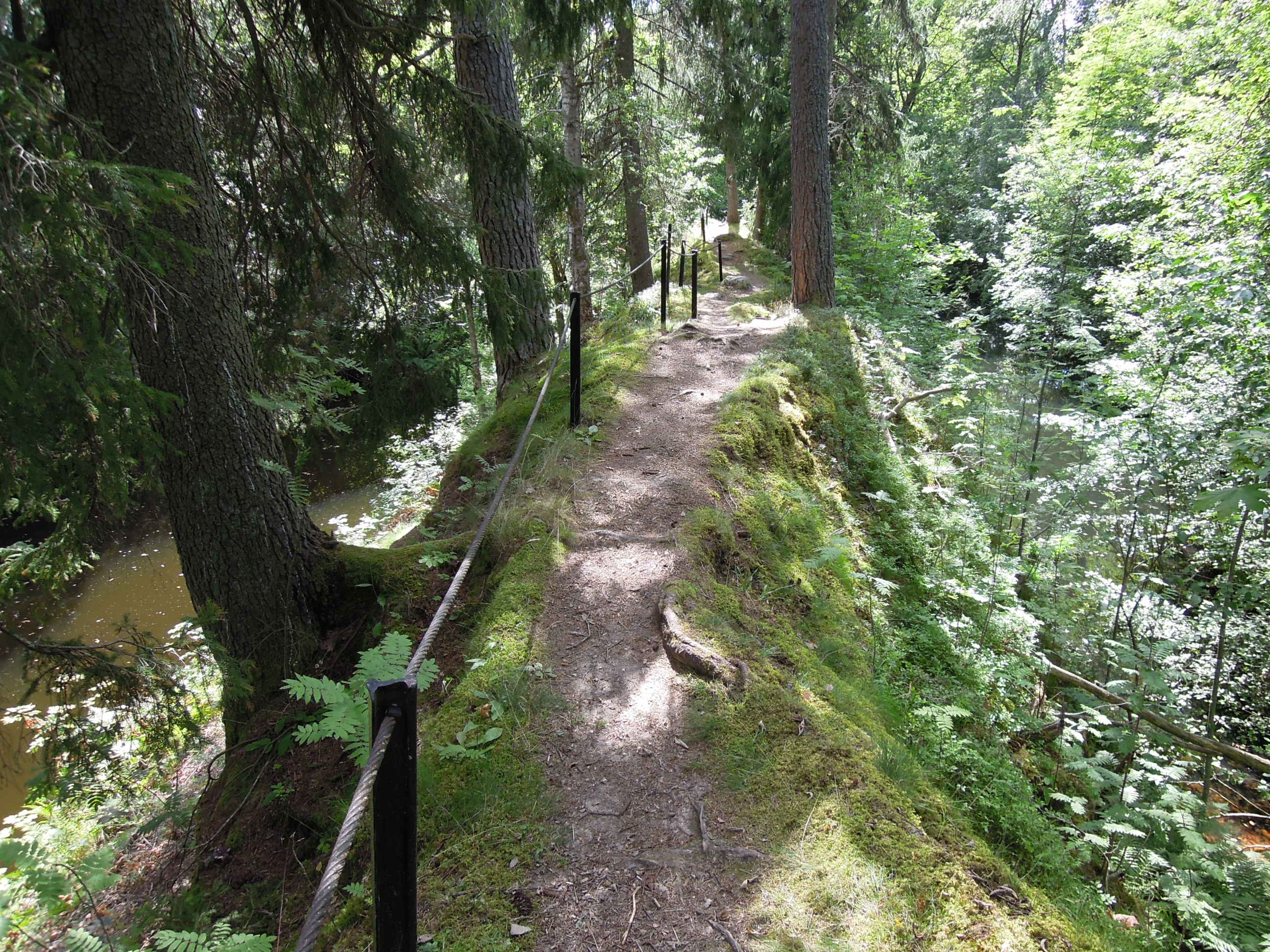
The pig back (Svinryggen), 18 open-pit mines from the Early Middle Ages

== See also ==
- Bergslagen
- Ecomuseum Bergslagen
