= Size Does Matter =

2014 mobile rhythm game

- App icon
- Developer: DOS Studios
- Publisher: Channel 4 Television
- Designers: Silje Merethe Dahl, Lars Øvre Andersen
- Programmers: Nick La Rooy, Trond Fasteraune
- Artist: Mattis Delerud
- Engine: Unity
- Platforms: iOS, Android
- Release: iOS; August 13, 2014; Android; August 21, 2014
- Genre: Rhythm
- Mode: Single-player

Size Does Matter, stylized as Size DOES Matter, is a 2014 indie rhythm game developed by DOS Studios and released by Channel 4 Television for iOS and Android. Players move and resize a set of blocks to fit through moving obstacles and score points. It won the Channel 4 Award at Dare to Be Digital 2013, and the British Academy of Film and Television Arts (BAFTA) Ones to Watch Award 2014.

== Gameplay ==
The player controls a set of blocks which can be moved and resized by swiping up/down at the left and right sides of the touch screen. The player earns points by perfectly fitting through the gaps between each obstacle. Doing this multiple times in a row creates a combo and increases the number of points scored in each successful gap, but if the player hits an obstacle they get a strike and their combo ends. There are multiple power ups including 'Slow-Mo', which slows down time for a few seconds, and 'Body Double', which adds another column of blocks allowing the player to score double points.

Each level is based on a segment of an electronic dance music (EDM) song. Bonus sequences can be reached if fewer than three strikes are made. These are based on the same song, but more difficult. The score achieved in each part of the level is combined to give the final score.

== Music ==
The game features songs from Jonas Eide, Philter, Cristian Voicu, Eirik Suhrke, Rymdreglage, Savant and Chipzel. The music played on the main title screen is "Living iPod" by Savant.

=== Soundtrack ===
Many of the songs were released in a soundtrack album in October 2014.

Size Does Matter (Official Game Soundtrack)

Soundtrack album by Various Artists
- Released: October 4, 2014
- Genre: Electronic dance music

| No. | Title | Music | Length |
|---|---|---|---|
| 1. | "Temperance" | Chipzel | 1:13 |
| 2. | "Fanservice" | Eirik Suhrke | 1:26 |
| 3. | "Zombie Pace" | Rymdreglage | 3:20 |
| 4. | "Infinite Cobra" | Eirik Suhrke | 1:16 |
| 5. | "Phantasm Cats" | Eirik Suhrke | 1:22 |
| 6. | "Blue Haze" | Cristian Voicu | 1:14 |
| 7. | "Blam" | Jonas Eide | 1:11 |
| 8. | "Full Metal" | Jonas Eide | 1:03 |
| Total length: | | | 12:07 |

== Development ==
Initially called Size DOS Matter, the game was created for Dare to Be Digital 2013, a student game design competition run by Abertay University, over a period of nine weeks. The team consisted of a group of five students from the Norwegian School of Information Technology. Mattis Delerud was the team leader and artist, Silje Dahl and Lars Øvre Andersen were game designers, and Nick La Rooy and Trond Fasteraune were programmers.

Videos of the game's development and early demo builds show that the game was developed using the Unity game engine. During development an internal level editor was created, multiple input schemes were tested, and the visuals were designed to emphasise the beat of the songs. The "Super Easy" tutorial level was added to help teach the player the basic controls of the game.

The prototype was presented at the Dare ProtoPlay festival from 8–11 August in Caird Hall, Dundee, where it was announced that they had won the Channel 4 Award. This included £25,000 of funding for additional work on the game and mentoring support. The game was published on the Apple App Store, Google Play Store and Amazon Appstore the following year.

== Reception ==
Reception

Aggregate score
| Aggregator | Score |
|---|---|
| Metacritic | 77/100 |

Review scores
| Publication | Score |
|---|---|
| Pocket Gamer | 4/5 |
| TouchArcade | 3.5/5 |

Size Does Matter was generally well received by reviewers, with an average Metacritic score of 77/100. TouchArcade criticised the perfection demanded by the three strike system, but considered it a good "arcade survival game" praising its fun frantic gameplay. Pocket Gamer called it "elegant and challenging" praising the bright neon visuals, comparing the game to Super Hexagon which also includes music by Chipzel. Whilst they also criticised the three strike system, they liked the potential for mastery and enjoyed the rewarding feeling of beating the levels.

=== Awards ===
- Dare to Be Digital 2013 – Channel 4 Award
- BAFTA Ones to Watch 2014 – Winner
