= Komplett Arnold =

Punk rock band from Norberg, Sweden

- Origin: Norberg, Sweden
- Genres: Punk rock
- Years active: 1989–1995
- Past members: Per Findahl; Fredrik Findahl; Daniel Wiik; Fredrik Haglund

Komplett Arnold was a punk rock band formed in 1989 in Norberg, Sweden by brothers and guitarists Per and Fredrik Findahl, drummer Fredrik Haglund and bassist Daniel Wiik. Fredrik Findahl and Daniel Wiik provided vocals.

== History ==
Komplett Arnold was one of the leading groups on the music scene in Norberg during the 1990s. Komplett Arnold was formed in 1989 by the brothers Fredrik and Per Findahl. Soon after, Fredrik Haglund and Daniel Wiik joined the group. Their first gig was at the Rockaway Beach festival 1990, an annual punk rock festival held in Norberg.

After a gig at Kulturhuset, Stockholm, on 27 December 1995, together with Coca Carola, the members decided to end the group. At this time they got quite many requests to play at different places in Sweden, but a hand injury forced the lead guitarist Fredrik to quit playing for almost a year.

During the six years, they recorded three demo tapes and one CD and they made a number of live performances. They also made T-shirts and other stuff to finance their music. After the break-up, they remixed the demo tapes and other recordings, which have resulted in a couple of new CDs with old material.

Komplett Arnold never had a contract with a record company, but they had their own business. They financed their recordings with own owned money and they found distributors for their CD to spread their music to stores and mail-order companies around Sweden.

Ten years after their first gig, Komplett Arnold reunited for a gig in Norberg the summer of 2000. This was the last time they played together.

== Discography ==
- Dr. Knugelmeister (1991) (remastered in 1998)
- Hometown Revolution (1992)
- Sköt Dig Själv (1993)
- Största Hits (1997)
- Svenska Hits (2002)
