= Don't Look Back (video game) =

2009 video game

- Developer: Distractionware
- Publisher: Kongregate
- Designer: Terry Cavanagh
- Engine: Adobe Flash
- Platforms: iOS, Android, Ouya
- Release: Flash; 2009 iOS; October 16, 2012; Android; October 17, 2012; Ouya; June 27, 2013
- Genre: Platform
- Mode: Single-player

Don't Look Back is a 2009 platform game playable through Adobe Flash and designed by Terry Cavanagh. The game is a modern interpretation of the Greek legend of Orpheus and Eurydice.

The game is a combination of two ideas: Cavanagh wished to create a "silly shooter" where the player's actions were "redeemed" after being shown from a different perspective, and he also wished to create a game where the gameplay acted as a metaphor for the player's actions.

Critics praised the game's addictiveness and presentation, but had different opinions over its high difficulty level.

== Gameplay ==
The game is an interpretation of the Orpheus and Eurydice legend with stylized graphics resembling those produced by the Atari 2600 game console.

Players control a man who begins the game standing at the grave of his lover. After finding a handgun, he descends into the underworld to find the spirit of the deceased and lead her back out to safety. Players have infinite chances to repeat each of the game's screens; the screen must be replayed if the player makes contact with an enemy or hazard, and also if the player turns the man to face his lover once she has been rescued. Play consists of crossing lava pits by jumping across platforms, circumnavigating other hazards, fending off enemies such as spiders and bats, and defeating bosses. After safely leading the spirit out of the underworld, the player reaches the gravestone where the game started, to encounter the man still stood at the grave. Both the player character and the spirit disappear, leaving the other figure standing alone at the grave. The journey is a fantasy; once completed the player is confronted by the reality of the figure silently grieving.

== Development ==
Don't Look Back is a combination of two separate ideas, one of which was what Cavanagh termed as "a silly shooter or something like that", which would be "redeem(ed)" by a twist which would show the player's actions in a different light. The other idea was creating a game where the gameplay itself was "a metaphor for something else that's happening to the player".

== Reception ==
The iOS port had initially been rejected by Apple due to its marketing material stating that "There are no in-app purchases or any of that nonsense".

Journalists praised Don't Look Back overall, in particular its presentation. Jim Rossignol of Rock, Paper, Shotgun described Don't Look Back as "simplistic, but very tricky", adding "It's really well done". Indie game developer Derek Yu stated it is a moody game similar to Seiklus but "more focused and challenging", and that it is rewarding to play for fans of the genre. Tim Rose of IndieGames.com said the game is "simply quite brilliant" and "great platforming fun that deserves to be played". Madeline Blondeau of Paste magazine complimented the game's minimalist aesthetic, stating that it allowed for open interpretation that invoked personal feeling in players. The staff of online video game magazine The Escapist found the game addictive, "a perfect example of doing more with less", and stated it possesses a "wonderfully haunting aesthetic".

In a positive examination of Don't Look Back, game designer Emily Short (writing for Gamasutra) described the game as "not a masterpiece", but she noted that it illustrates "the methods by which a masterpiece will one day be written." She also pointed to the fact that the difficulty of the game elevated it in a way that was impossible for traditional accounts of the Orpheus myth (opera, sculpture, painting, and literature). Through the struggle the player identifies with Orpheus on a much deeper level. Blondeau offered a similar viewpoint about the difficulty adding to the game's experience, claiming that the mechanic of traversing through the underworld backwards represented a diegesis in its gameplay. She also averred that through its interweaving of gameplay and narrative, the game exalted to a "cogent and meditative reflection on love, loss, and the agonizing liminal space between both".

The game was included on game journalist Michael Rose's 2014 book 250 Indie Games You Must Play, and has been credited with bringing Cavanagh into mainstream recognition.
