= Dicey Dungeons =

2019 video game

- Developer: Terry Cavanagh
- Publisher: Terry Cavanagh
- Designer: Terry Cavanagh
- Programmer: Justo Delgado Baudi
- Artist: Marlowe Dobbe
- Writer: Holly Gramazio
- Composer: Chipzel
- Platforms: Linux; macOS; Windows; Nintendo Switch; Xbox One; Xbox Series X/S; Android; iOS; PlayStation 4; PlayStation 5
- Release: 13 August 2019: Windows, macOS, Linux; 13 August 2019; Switch; 15 December 2020; Xbox One, Series X/S; 11 November 2021; iOS, Android; 7 July 2022; PS4, PS5; 6 February 2023
- Genre: Roguelike deck-building
- Mode: Single-player

Dicey Dungeons is a roguelike deck-building game developed by Irish game designer Terry Cavanagh. It was released for Microsoft Windows, macOS, and Linux in August 2019, for Nintendo Switch in December 2020, for Xbox One and Xbox Series X/S in November 2021, and for PlayStation 4 and PlayStation 5 in February 2023. Ports for iOS and Android were released in July 2022.

== Gameplay ==
The player character (bottom left) fighting a dungeon enemy (top right). Each turn, the player or enemy slot random dice rolls into equipment, represented by the larger boxes, as to have the numerical values create combat effects.

Dicey Dungeons combines elements of roguelike games with deck-building games. The game takes place on a game show-like backdrop, where Lady Luck challenges adventurers, who have been turned into dice, to complete a dungeon with a rather unlikely chance of winning their freedom. The player takes one of six characters, which defines the type of equipment they will start with. The player then moves their character across a dungeon map, where there are various encounters with monsters, treasure chests, health items, shops, and upgrade stations, along with exits to the next level. The goal of each run is to reach the lowest level of the dungeon and defeat the boss. Doing so unlocks the metagame progression, such as unlocking additional characters, or new episodes for existing characters that introduce new rulesets that make runs more difficult.

When encountering a monster, the combat takes place in a turn-based manner. On their turn, the player is shown their equipment, each of which has slots for one or more dice to be added, and then a random roll of the number of dice their character currently possesses. The player then places each dice into one of the equipment slots; when all slots are filled, this creates a combat effect. For example, a sword may have a slot for a single dice, and when a dice is slotted, it will do the damage shown on that dice. Some slots have specific requirements, such as an odd or even number, or dice values less or greater than some number. Some equipment or abilities can alter the dice rolls, allowing the dice to be reused. The player continues to slot dice into equipment and abilities until they have exhausted their dice for the turn, or end their turn early. Their opponents have similar equipment with dice slots, and arranges their attacks in similar manner. There are various buffs and debuffs that can be triggered through equipment from both the player and enemy. Combat continues until the player character's health or the enemies' health drops to zero, or both. If only the player character's health is reduced to zero, then the game is over and the player must restart the game. If the enemy's health is reduced to zero, the enemy is defeated and the player character wins, gaining in-game monetary rewards and character experience, along with other potential rewards. By gaining levels, the player character gains more total health as well as an extra dice that is rolled. The player may also get new equipment that they can equip on the character at any time outside of battles. Shops in levels can be used to buy new equipment, trade equipment, or other features. Upgrade stations can improve the effect of one piece of equipment.

== Development ==
Terry Cavanagh announced Dicey Dungeons in May 2018, after about three months of prior development, with an in-progress free version available for users to try up to this point. Cavanagh had planned to produce a commercial version of the game for release later in 2018. Dicey Dungeons is inspired by one of the first roguelike deck-builder games, Dream Quest. The game's art was created by Marlowe Dobbe, while its music was composed by Chipzel and it was written by Holly Gramazio.

Dicey Dungeons was released on 13 August 2019 for Microsoft Windows, macOS, and Linux personal computers, and on 15 December 2020 for Nintendo Switch. The game was ported to Xbox One and Xbox Series X/S by Ratalaika Games, and released on 11 November 2021.

Cavanagh originally planned to release ports of the title for iOS and Android by 2020, but these were released on 7 July 2022, alongside new content released for free, entitled "Reunion".

== Reception ==
Reception

Aggregate scores
Aggregator	Score
Metacritic	PC: 80/100; NS: 88/100; IOS: 98/100
OpenCritic	87% recommend

Review scores
Publication	Score
Destructoid	10/10
GameRevolution	8/10
GameSpot	7/10
Nintendo Life	9/10
Nintendo World Report	9.5/10
PC Gamer (US)	81/100
Pocket Gamer	5/5
RPGFan	72/100
TouchArcade	NS: 4.5/5; IOS: 5/5
USgamer	3/5

Dicey Dungeons received "generally favorable" reviews for Windows and Switch according to review aggregator website Metacritic; the mobile version received "universal acclaim". Fellow review aggregator OpenCritic assessed that the game received strong approval, being recommended by 87% of critics. The game has been called a good introduction into roguelike deck-building games. The Windows release of the game was among the best-selling new releases of the month on Steam. (Note: Based on total revenue for the first two weeks on sale)

Following its initial release exclusive to Bandcamp, game soundtrack record label Materia Collective released the official soundtrack by Chipzel on 20 December 2019.
