= Terry Cavanagh (developer) =

Irish-born UK-based game designer (born 1984)

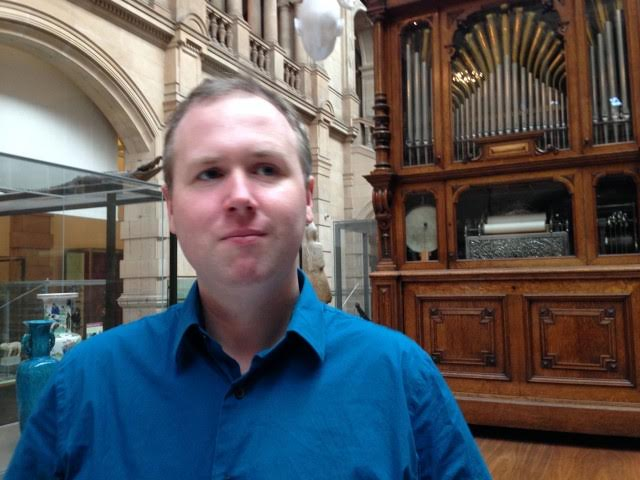
- Cavanagh in 2016
- Born: 1984 (age 41–42); Tydavnet, County Monaghan, Ireland
- Education: Trinity College
- Occupation: Video game designer
- Known for: VVVVVV; Super Hexagon; Dicey Dungeons
- Spouse: Holly Gramazio
- Website: distractionware.com

Terry Cavanagh (/ˈkævənɑː/, KAV-ə-nah; born 1984) is an Irish video game designer based in London, England. He has created over two dozen games, most notably VVVVVV, Super Hexagon, and Dicey Dungeons.

== Biography ==
After studying mathematics at Trinity College in Dublin, Cavanagh worked briefly as a market risk analyst before moving to focus on game development full-time in 2007. While he received some attention in the press for his "serious and arty" indie games, Cavanagh faced significant financial difficulties in his early career. He was reportedly close to abandoning game development when VVVVVV (released in 2010) became an unexpected success, providing him with the financial means to continue developing games.

In the midst of the COVID-19 pandemic, in 2020, he gave away 1000 copies of three of his games for free in the hope it would "offer a distraction" to those in need of it.

Many of his titles share a primitive, minimalist retro aesthetic. He is credited as a programmer for Alphaland, a platform game by Jonas Kyratzes.

Cavanagh has stated that he prefers the personal nature of independent game development, its smaller scale enabling the personality of the creator to shine through in the final product.

== Influences ==
Cavanagh cites the 1997 Japanese RPG Final Fantasy VII as his favorite game, crediting it as his inspiration for becoming a video game developer. In 2009 Cavanagh named interactive fiction writer Adam Cadre as his favorite developer.

== Awards ==
- Cavanagh's game VVVVVV won the 2010 IndieCade Festival in the category of "Fun/Compelling".
- In 2014, Cavanagh was named to Forbes' annual "30 Under 30" list in the Games category.
- In 2019, Cavanagh's game Dicey Dungeons won the 2019 IndieCade Grand Jury award.

== Ludography ==
Game	Platform	Release date
XOLDIERS	Microsoft Windows	2008
Squish	Microsoft Windows	2008
Self Destruct	Microsoft Windows	2008
Transport Stories	Microsoft Windows	2008
Never Opened	Microsoft Windows	2008
We Love Mind Control Rocket	Microsoft Windows	2008
Judith	Microsoft Windows, Mac OS X, Linux	2009
Pathways	Microsoft Windows	2009
Airplane Adventures	Adobe Flash	2009
The Baron's Volcano Party	Adobe Flash	2009
DAS PÜZZELSPIELEN	Adobe Flash	2009
Nun Squad	Microsoft Windows	2009
Bullfist	Adobe Flash	2009
Nanny ZERO	Microsoft Windows, Mac OS X	2009
Deterministica	Adobe Flash	2009
Airplane Adventures 2: The Return	Adobe Flash	2009
The Best Years of my Life	Adobe Flash	2009
Bullet Time	Adobe Flash	2009
Don't Look Back	Microsoft Windows, iOS, Android, OUYA	2009
Radio Silence	Microsoft Windows, Mac OS X, Unity	2010
N.O.T.T.U.B.	Adobe Flash	2010
Sumouse	Microsoft Windows	2010
Kozachok	Adobe Flash	2010
Vegetable Game	Adobe Flash	2010
Going Forward	Adobe Flash	2010
Bababadalgharaghtakamminarronnkonnbronntonnerronn tuonnthunntrovarrhounawnskawntoohoohoordenenthurnuk	Adobe Flash, OUYA	2010
memrrtiks, suashem	Adobe Flash	2010
Phobiaphobiaphobia	Adobe Flash	2010
Red Sky	Microsoft Windows, Mac OS X, Unity,	2010
Bridge	Adobe Flash	2010
VVVVVV	Microsoft Windows, Mac OS X, Linux, Nintendo 3DS, Nintendo Switch, PlayStation Vita, iOS, Android, OUYA	2010
American Dream	Microsoft Windows, OUYA	2011
Hero's Adventure	Adobe Flash	2011
Oiche Mhaith	Adobe Flash, OUYA	2011
At a Distance	Microsoft Windows	2011
Super Hexagon	iOS, Microsoft Windows, Mac OS X, Android, Blackberry 10, Linux, OUYA	2012
ChatChat	Adobe Flash	2012
Hexagon	Adobe Flash, OUYA	2012
Harmonilr	Adobe Flash	2012
Griefer	Adobe Flash	2012
Notsnake	Adobe Flash	2012
Collapse	HTML5	2013
Fountain	Adobe Flash	2013
Naya's Quest	Adobe Flash	2013
Experiment 12	Microsoft Windows, Mac OS X	2013
Maverick Bird	Adobe Flash	2014
Moving Stories	Adobe Flash	2014
GRAB THEM BY THE EYES	Adobe Flash	2015
Copycat	Adobe Flash, Microsoft Windows, Mac OS X, Linux	2015
Constellation Machine	Microsoft Windows, Mac OS X, Linux, Adobe Flash	2016
Tiny Heist	Microsoft Windows, Mac OS, online	2016
Dicey Dungeons	Microsoft Windows, macOS, Linux, Nintendo Switch, iOS, Android, Xbox One, Xbox Series X/S, PlayStation 4, PlayStation 5	2019
Climb the Giant Man Obby	Roblox	2021
Anyone Could Be Struck By Lightning At Any Time	Roblox	2021
Triangle Run	Microsoft Windows, macOS, Linux	2021
Mr. Platformer	Microsoft Windows, macOS, Linux	2023
Terry's Other Games	Microsoft Windows, macOS, Linux	2025
Egg	HTML5, Microsoft Windows, macOS, Linux	2025
State Machine	Microsoft Windows, macOS, Linux	TBA

== Additional works ==
Cavanagh also created Bosca Ceoil in 2013, followed by a version 2.0 in 2015. Bosca Ceoil is a free and open source music making tool, designed for ease-of-use, particularly for beginners. A modern port, Bosca Ceoil: The Blue Album, was created in 2024 by Yuri Sizov.
