= Norbergfestival =

Music festival in Norberg, Sweden

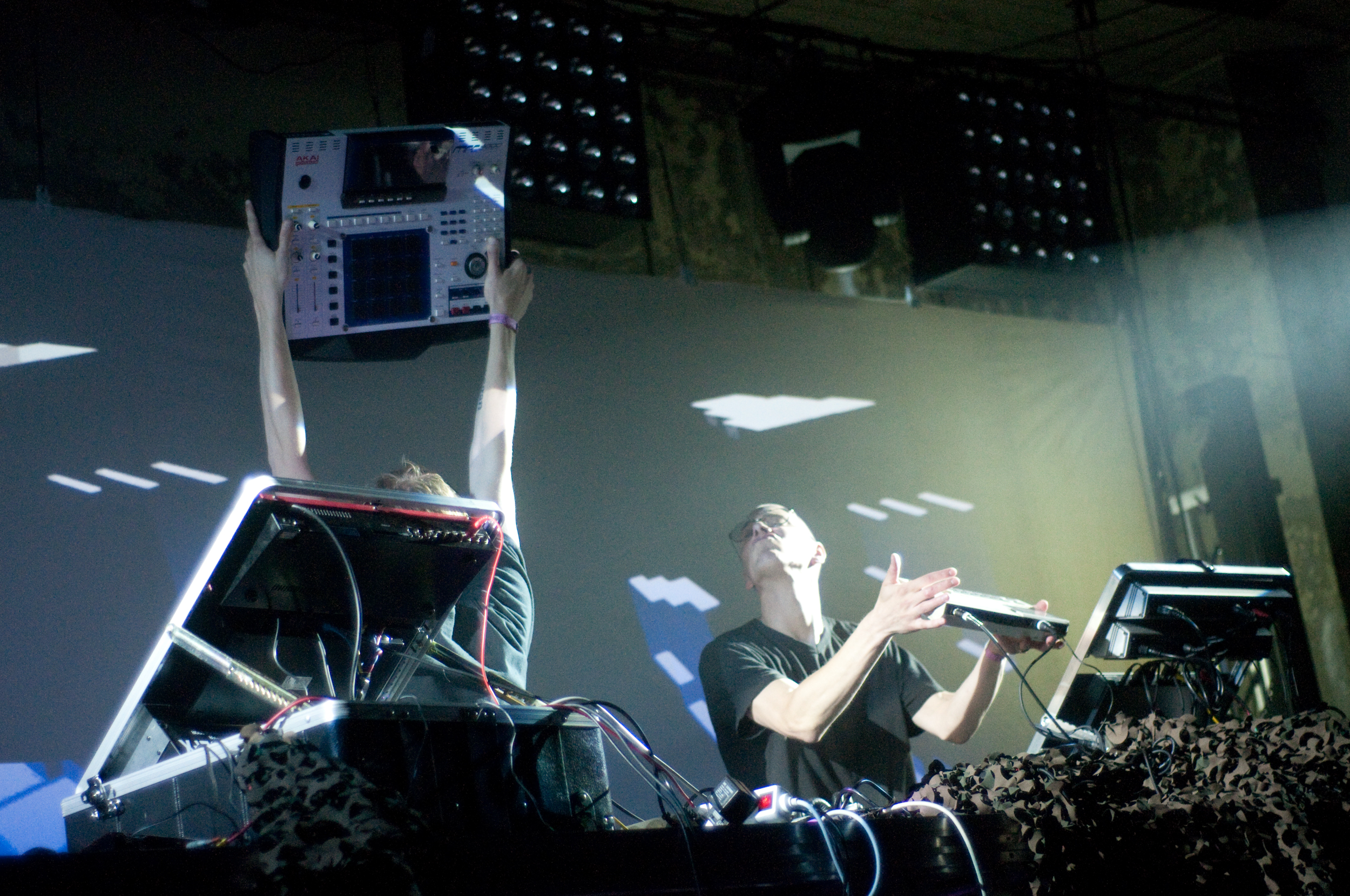
- Akai MPC4000, Norbergfestival 2009
- Genre: Electronic dance music, experimental music, avantgarde, EAM, drone, electronica, 8-bit, acid, breakcore, Detroit techno, dubstep
- Locations: Norberg, Västmanland, Sweden
- Years active: 1999-present
- Founders: Michael Østerz Christiansen and Dag Celsing
- Website: Norbergfestival web site

Norbergfestival is a Scandinavian electronic and experimental music festival held in Norberg, Västmanland, Sweden. The festival was started in 1999 by Michael Østerz Christiansen and Dag Celsing. The event attracts people of different ages and most visitors come from Sweden, Denmark, Norway, Finland, UK or Germany

== History ==
There are four main stages on the festival, the first of which is Mimer with a staggering reverb of more than 7 seconds; concrete and steel structures are the raw surroundings. Kraftcentralen is the old power plant, where the clubbing and dancing atmosphere is intense. Krossverket hosts more intimate concerts and performance art. 303 is the official underground stage. On top of that, the ReallyOpenStage gives visitors a chance to play either on bought or borrowed machines. Art installations are present in Mimer and around the festival area.

Norbergfestival is held inside and around an abandoned mining area. The main concert building, Mimerlaven, was once a pithead frame for the extraction of iron ore. The structure was erected in 1957. Hematite and magnetite from the pits around Norberg were brought into Mimer, crushed and then further processed. The mining business was discontinued in the 1980s.

Every year, around 90 artists perform at Norbergfestival. Music styles include Avantgarde, EAM, Drone, Electronica, 8-bit, Acid, Breakcore, Detroit techno and Dubstep. Notable artists like Pole, Pamelia Kurstin, Luke Vibert, Kid606, Fennesz, B12, Vladislav Delay, Milanese, Pan Sonic, Monolake, Bong-Ra, Skream, Biosphere, DJ Food, Psilodump, Andreas Tilliander, Paul Woolford, Skudge and many more have performed at the festival.

Originally, the festival was run by the Danish-Swedish Norbergfestival association. Since 2012 the festival is being run by the association Anrikningsverket.

== See also ==
- List of electronic music festivals
- List of experimental music festivals
