= Sleepmakeswaves =

Australian post-rock band

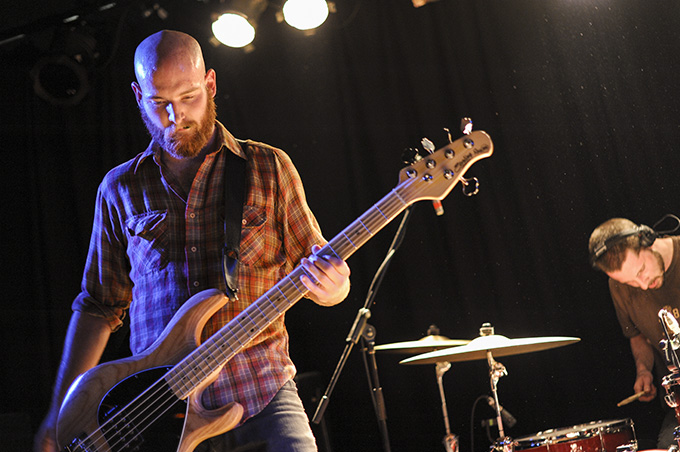
- Sleepmakeswaves performing at the 2012 SXSW festival in Austin, Texas.

Background information
- Origin: Sydney, New South Wales, Australia
- Genres: Post-rock; progressive rock; post-metal
- Years active: 2006–present
- Label: Bird's Robe Records
- Members: Alex Wilson; Otto Wicks-Green; Tim Adderley
- Past members: Tom Binetter; William Smith; Jonathan "Kid" Khor; Daniel Oreskovic
- Website: http://www.sleepmakeswaves.com

Sleepmakeswaves are an Australian post-rock band who formed in Sydney in December 2006. The group is currently composed of guitarist Otto Wicks-Green, drummer Tim Adderley, and bassist/keyboardist Alex Wilson. To date, they have released four full-length studio albums. The band have achieved notable success internationally for their energetic live performances and modern approach to the post-rock genre. They are currently released through Australian independent record label Bird's Robe Records, which is distributed through MGM in Australia and independently worldwide. In 2013, UK label Monotreme Records licensed their debut album for an international release across the UK, Europe, and North America.

== Career ==
=== 2006–2010: Career beginnings and In Today, Already Walks Tomorrow ===
The band formed when Alex Wilson and Tom Binetter responded to a Myspace post by Jonathan Khor, looking to start a new post rock project. Khor had previously collaborated with Jeremy Davidson (aka Johnny Wishbone of the Snowdroppers) and Dom Alessio (of Triple J's Home and Hosed), before continuing to compose music under the name Sleepmakeswaves (which was originally coined by Alessio). Binetter recruited drummer William Smith and the band recorded a self-titled demo, which was released free online through the Lost Children Net Label.

In 2008, the band released their debut EP, In Today, Already Walks Tomorrow featuring 6 tracks. The success of the EP proved the catalyst for the band's international fan base, aiding this, one fan included the track "one day you will teach me to let go of my fears" on a Twilight movie fan video on YouTube, Topping 200,000 hits in a matter of days, the video briefly exposed the band to a worldwide audience before being taken down.

In Australia, the band supported Pelican on their 2009 Australian tour. Later in 2009, founding guitarist Tom Binetter announced his decision to leave the band to pursue a career in law. He was replaced by long-time fan and friend of the band, Otto Wicks-Green. The new lineup began work on what would become the band's debut record, recording for eight days on location in Wingello State Forest in rural Australia with producer Dax Liniere of Puzzle Factory Sound Studio.

=== 2011–2013: ...And So We Destroyed Everything ===
...And So We Destroyed Everything was released through new independent label Bird's Robe Records in 2011. The album generated enough buzz for the band to pursue extensive national tours of Australia in regular succession. They were also invited to support American post-metal band Russian Circles and Japan's Mono and Boris on their Australian visits. During their national tour in support of the record, it was announced that founding drummer Will Smith would be departing to pursue work interests. After a short audition process, the band announced their new drummer, Tim Adderley, also of Sydney band Pirate. The band performed at the 2011 Peats Ridge Festival for New Year's Eve and announced a national tour for February and March 2012. They were also announced as the national support for Karnivool's 16-date sold out Australian tour. The success of the band's album enabled them to tour overseas for the first time. Sleepmakeswaves announced they would be performing at the 2012 SXSW music festival during their March US tour. They were also invited to co-headline Belgium's dunk!festival alongside 65daysofstatic in April, becoming the first Australian band to play at the event.

The band completed their first European tour in April 2012, playing 15 dates across 8 countries. In July, the band announced the Now We Rise and We Are Everywhere Australian tour for September and were also announced as one of the supports for the Sydney and Melbourne dates of Tortoise's Australian tour in October.

In October 2012, it was announced that ...And So We Destroyed Everything had been nominated for the ARIA Award for Best Hard Rock or Heavy Metal Album at the ARIA Music Awards of 2012. Sleepmakeswaves confirmed they would be touring with influential UK electronic-rock band 65daysofstatic on their Australian visit in January 2013 and co-headlined Melbourne's Rock The Bay Festival in February 2013 alongside Electric Mary and The Beards.

In January 2013, Sleepmakeswaves released a remix album ...And then they remixed everything featuring new interpretations of their album tracks, with contributions from 65daysofstatic, Rosetta, Kyson, Tangled Thoughts of Leaving, Glosfrosch, Ten Thousand Free Men & Their Families, Atlantis and True Vibe Nation member DJ Klue. The band announced an extensive Australian tour for June & July 2013, premiering new material and performing multiple shows in cities with alternating sets each night.

In June 2013, the band announced they had signed with UK label Monotreme Records, for a US and European release of their debut album. The release included a deluxe edition of the album, including the remix album, as well as the band's first ever vinyl release.

=== 2014–2016: Love of Cartography ===
On 15 May 2014, the band premiered "Something Like Avalanches" on Triple J. On 4 July 2014, Love of Cartography was released and subsequently debuted at No. 31 on the ARIA Charts. In September, the band announced a national tour with Dead Letter Circus and Voyager in December.

Love of Cartography was nominated at the ARIA Music Awards of 2014. It was also nominated for Australian Album of the Year at the J Awards of 2014 and Best Independent Heavy Album at the AIR Awards of 2014.

In January 2015, the 55-date 'Great Northern' international tour was announced. The band's headline show at Sydney's Metro Theatre (their 55th and final show) was recorded for Triple J's Live at the Wireless program; and was broadcast on Monday 25 July 2015.

In November 2015, Khor announced his departure from the band; with their remaining booked shows serving as his final performances. With Khor's departure, Wilson is the only remaining original member of the band. Khor's replacement was announced in January 2016 as Meniscus guitarist Daniel Oreskovic. In 2016, the band announced their first tour of North America in four years, supporting progressive metal outfit The Contortionist and UK djent band Monuments on a six-week tour from March to May. During this tour, the band recorded and released a live session through Audiotree, featuring four tracks.

=== 2017–2019: Made of Breath Only ===
In January 2017, the band were confirmed as the national support for American post-hardcore band Underoath. February 2017 saw the band announce the release of their third studio album, Made of Breath Only. The first single, "Tundra", was premiered on Triple J on 8 February 2017. The band undertook a headlining tour of China and Australia in March before touring with the Devin Townsend Project in May. For this touring, Oreskovic sat out to focus on other projects. He was replaced by Gay Paris guitarist Lachlan Marks as a touring member of the band. Made of Breath Only debuted at No. 15 on the Australia ARIA Charts.

In June 2017, the band appeared as guests on the Triple J breakfast show to perform on the Like a Version segment. The band performed two songs: "Tundra" from Made of Breath Only and a cover of Robert Miles' "Children".

In August 2017, the band traveled to the UK for an exclusive main stage set at ArcTanGent Festival. In September 2017, they performed at the BigSound music festival in Brisbane, Australia. Later that month they departed for a five-week headlining tour of the UK and Europe, including Norway's Vivid Festival, Germany's Euroblast Festival, Netherlands' ProgPower Festival and Spain's Aloud Music Festival.

During 2018, the band took a break from touring, whilst producing a tribute to Metallica for the 30th anniversary of ...And Justice for All. The instrumental track "To Live Is To Die" was released in August 2018. In 2018, the band celebrated 10 years since their debut EP with shows in September and October and featured the return of founding member Jonathan 'Kid' Khor on guitar for all shows. Original guitarist Tom Binetter also joined the band on stage in Newcastle and Sydney for a performance of "By Moving The Stars I Have Found Where You are Hiding" from the band's 2007 demo recordings. The tour featured Northern Ireland band And So I Watch You From Afar as special guests.

In 2019, the band co-headlined a UK & Europe tour with COG, performing at Prognosis Festival in the Netherlands and other club dates.

=== 2020–21: These Are Not Your Dreams ===
In January 2020, the band announced a trilogy of 3 EPs called These Are Not Your Dreams. The first song, "Cascades" from the No Safe Place EP, was premiered on Triple J's Home and Hosed, followed by tracks "Batavia" and "The Endings That We Write" in subsequent weeks. The trilogy later debuted at #25 on the ARIA Chart. The band announced plans to tour Australia with support from UK band Rolo Tomassi, but these dates were postponed due to the pandemic and Rolo Tomassi were later excused from the lineup due to scheduling conflicts.

=== 2021–2023: Live at the Metro ===
In November 2021, the band released a live album named Live at the Metro with recordings taken from their 2015 Metro Theatre show originally recorded for Triple J's Live at the Wireless. They were announced for the inaugural Monolith Festival alongside Karnivool, COG & Plini in March 2022, following by their rescheduled These Are Not Your Dreams tour for May 2022, however both tours were rescheduled to August 2022 and September/October 2022 respectively.

=== 2024-present: It’s Here, But I Have No Names For It ===
In April 2024, the band released their 4th full-length studio album It’s Here, But I Have No Names For It through Bird's Robe Records. The album was self-produced and engineered by the band, and mixed by Andrei Eremin. They toured Australia, the UK, Europe, and USA in support of the record, including headlining at Dunk Festival in Belgium and Post Festival in Indianapolis. 2025 saw the band announced as co-headliners of the Bird's Robe 15th Birthday tour alongside Caspian, ...And You Will Know Us by the Trail of Dead, Cog and other artists affiliated with the Bird's Robe Records label.

== Members ==
=== Current members ===
- Alex Wilson – bass guitar, keyboards, piano (2006–present)
- Otto Wicks-Green – guitar (2009–present)
- Tim Adderley – drums (2011–present)

=== Current touring musicians ===
- Lachlan Marks – guitar (2017–present)
- Simeon Bartholomew – guitar (2025–present)

=== Former members ===
- Jonathan "Kid" Khor – guitar (2006–2015, 2018)
- Tom Binetter – guitar (2006–2009)
- William Smith – drums (2006–2011)
- Daniel Oreskovic – guitar (2016–2017)

Timeline

== Discography ==
=== Studio albums ===
Title	Details	Peak chart positions
Title	Details	AUS
...And So We Destroyed Everything	Released: 2011; Label: Bird's Robe Records (BRR006); Format: CD, digital download	—
Love of Cartography	Released: July 2014; Label: Bird's Robe Records (BRR046); Format: CD, LP, digital download	31
Made of Breath Only	Released: March 2017; Label: Bird's Robe Records (BRR082); Format: CD, LP, digital download	15
These Are Not Your Dreams	Released: 7 August 2020; Label: Bird's Robe Records (BRR130); Format: CD, LP, digital download	25
It's Here, But I Have No Names For It	Released: 12 April 2024; Label: Bird's Robe Records; Format: CD, LP, digital download	—

=== Remix albums ===
Title	Details
...And Then They Remixed Everything	Released: January 2013; Label: Bird's Robe Records (BRR031); Format: CD, digital download

=== Extended plays ===
Title	Details
Sleepmakeswaves	Released: June 2007 (UK); Label: Lost Children Net Label (LostChildren027); Format: digital download; Note: 2-track 8 cm CDR demo
In Today Already Walks Tomorrow	Released: 2008; Label: Sleepmakeswaves (SMW002); Format: digital download
Sleepmakeswaves on Audiotree Live	Released: 28 April 2016; Label: Sleepmakeswaves (SMW002); Format: digital download

== Awards and nominations ==
=== AIR Awards ===
The Australian Independent Record Awards (commonly known informally as AIR Awards) is an annual awards night to recognise, promote and celebrate the success of Australia's Independent Music sector.

Year	Nominee / work	Award	Result
2014	Love of Cartography	Best Independent Hard Rock or Punk Album	Nominated
2018	Made of Breath Only	Best Independent Hard Rock or Punk Album	Nominated

=== ARIA Music Awards ===
The ARIA Music Awards is an annual awards ceremony held by the Australian Recording Industry Association. They commenced in 1987.

Year	Nominee / work	Award	Result
2012	...And So We Destroyed Everything	Best Hard Rock/Heavy Metal Album	Nominated
2014	Love of Cartography	Best Hard Rock/Heavy Metal Album	Nominated
2017	Made of Breath Only	Best Hard Rock/Heavy Metal Album	Nominated

=== J Award ===
The J Awards are an annual series of Australian music awards that were established by the Australian Broadcasting Corporation's youth-focused radio station Triple J. They commenced in 2005.

Year	Nominee / work	Award	Result
2014	Love of Cartography	Australian Album of the Year	Nominated
