= Mas (Swedish term) =

Term for a man from or connected to Dalarna, Sweden

Mas is the term for a man of any age who either is from and/or have significant genealogical connection to the Swedish region Dalarna. The feminine counterparts are kulla (girl), keling or käring (married woman) or kuna (girlfriend).

== History ==
The word was invented in the capital, Stockholm, during the 18th century since many people from Dalarna, especially from the northern parts of the region, worked in Stockholm at the time. At the time the name Mats was a common name for males from Dalarna, but differences between accents made the name hard to interpret for the people of Stockholm, leading to the misheard name Mas.

The term became commonly used in Dalarna during the end of the 20th century, completely or at least partially replacing the old terms dalkarl (masculine) and kulla (feminine), although the term was traditionally perceived as somewhat humiliating since it was the urban people's way of describing the people of Dalarna as odd and rural.

=== Rumpmas ===
A related term is rumpmas, which is the term for a man coming from either the southern parts of Dalarna, including Avesta and Hedemora, or the northwestern part of Västmanland which used to be a part of Dalarna, mainly including Norberg. The feminine counterpart is rumpkulla.

==== Etymology ====
The origin of rombo and rumbo is the Old Swedish word rumber, which can be translated as open, wide or free, in this case referring to the lowland in the areas around Avesta, Hedemora and Norberg.

== See also ==
- Masarna
- Bergslagen
