= VVVVVV =

2010 video game

- Developer: Terry Cavanagh
- Publishers: WW: Terry Cavanagh; NA/EU: Nicalis (3DS, PS4, Vita, Switch)
- Designers: Terry Cavanagh; Bennett Foddy (Note: Foddy is credited in-game for naming every room in the game.)
- Composer: Magnus Pålsson
- Engine: Adobe Flash (original); C++ (2011 port)
- Platforms: Windows, Nintendo Switch, OS X, Linux, Nintendo 3DS, PlayStation Vita, PlayStation 4, iOS, Android, Ouya
- Release: January 11, 2010: Microsoft Windows, OS X January 11, 2010 Linux July 26, 2011 Nintendo 3DS; NA: December 29, 2011; EU: May 10, 2012; AU: October 4, 2012 Ouya June 11, 2014 iOS, Android June 12, 2014 PlayStation 4, PlayStation Vita; NA: August 25, 2015; EU: August 26, 2015 Nintendo Switch; NA/EU: November 17, 2017
- Genre: Puzzle-platform
- Mode: Single-player

VVVVVV (Note: Pronounced "V" (/ˈviː/, VEE).) is a 2010 puzzle-platform game created by Terry Cavanagh. In the game, the player controls Captain Viridian, who must rescue their spacecrew after a teleporter malfunction caused them to be separated in Dimension VVVVVV. The gameplay is characterized by the inability of the player to jump, instead controlling the direction of gravity, causing the player to fall upwards or downwards. The game consists of more than 400 individual rooms, and also supports the creation of user-created levels.

The game was built in Adobe Flash and released on January 11, 2010, for Microsoft Windows and OS X. The game was ported to C++ by Simon Roth in 2011, and released as part of the Humble Indie Bundle #3. The port to C++ allowed the porting of the game to other platforms such as Linux, Nintendo 3DS, and Nintendo Switch. Unofficial ports of the game have been made for the Pandora and Commodore 64.

== Gameplay ==
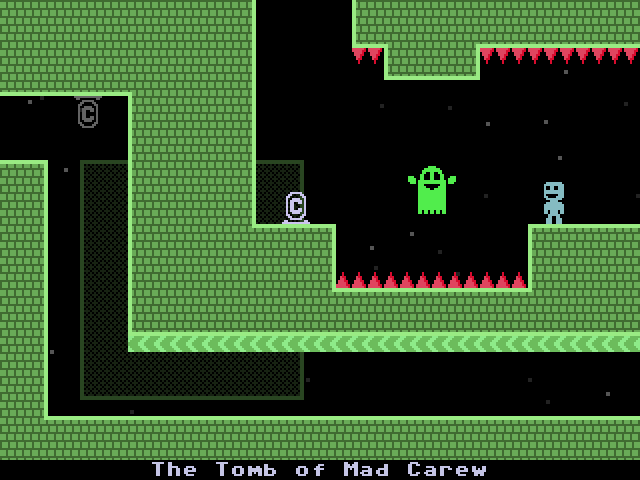
In this room, Captain Viridian must avoid the red spikes and green ghost. The "C" icon to the left of the spike pit is a checkpoint, which the player is returned to upon dying.

Unlike most platforming games, in VVVVVV the player is unable to jump. Instead, the direction of gravity can be reversed when standing on a surface, causing Captain Viridian to fall either upwards or downwards. The player uses this mechanic to traverse the game's environment and avoid various hazards, including stationary spikes and moving enemies. Later areas introduce new mechanics such as moving floors or rooms which, upon touching one edge of the screen, cause the player character to appear on the other side.

VVVVVV contains eight main levels, including an intro level, four levels which can be accessed in a non-linear sequence, two intermission levels, and one final level, only seen outside Dimension VVVVVV (in a "polar dimension"). These are situated inside a large open world for the player to explore, spanning more than 400 individual rooms. Due to its high level of difficulty, the game world contains many checkpoints, to which the player's character is reset upon death.

== Plot ==
The player controls Captain Viridian, who at the outset of VVVVVV must evacuate the spaceship along with the captain's crew when the ship becomes affected by "dimensional interference". The crew escapes through a teleporter on the ship; however, Captain Viridian is separated from the rest of the crew upon arrival. On returning to the ship, the Captain learns that the ship is trapped in an alternative dimension (referred to as "Dimension VVVVVV"), and that the ship's crew has been scattered throughout this dimension. The player's goal is to rescue the missing crew members and determine the cause of the dimensional interference.

== Development ==
The gravity-flipping mechanic of VVVVVV is based on an earlier game designed by Cavanagh titled Sine Wave Ninja, though this novel feature was first seen in the 1986 8-bit game Terminus. In an interview with Indiegames.com, Cavanagh said that he was interested in using this idea as a core concept of a game, something he felt other games which include a gravity-flipping mechanism had never done before.

Cavanagh first unveiled VVVVVV on his blog in June 2009. The game had been in development for two weeks, and Cavanagh estimated that the game would be finished in another two, "but hopefully not much longer." A follow-up post published in July 2009 included screenshots of the game and an explanation of the game's gravity-flipping mechanic. Cavanagh wrote that VVVVVV, unlike some of his previous work such as Judith and Pathways, would not be a "storytelling experiment", but rather "focused on the level design". The game was first shown publicly at the 2009 Eurogamer Expo, which gave Cavanagh the opportunity to collect feedback from players. In December 2009, a beta version of VVVVVV which had been given to donors was leaked on 4chan.

The visual style of VVVVVV is heavily inspired by 8-bit computer games from the 1980s, especially the Dizzy series and Monty on the Run, which is referenced in gameplay as collecting difficult-to-reach shiny objects and most notably the naming of each room; Cavanagh aimed to create a game "that looked and felt like the C64 games I grew up with." He eventually entrusted naming the rooms to QWOP developer Bennett Foddy, who created every room name in the final version. The game's music is heavily dependent on chiptune elements. Swedish composer Magnus Pålsson scored the game, and released the original soundtrack in 2010, titled PPPPPP.

Cavanagh also considered this game an opportunity to indulge in his "retro fetish". He has said because he lacks the technical prowess to make more modern-looking games, he instead focuses on making them visually interesting; additionally, he finds this to be made easier by "work[ing] within narrow limits". VVVVVV was the first game which Cavanagh sold commercially. While his previous games were all released as freeware, due to the size of VVVVVV compared to his previous work, Cavanagh felt that he "couldn't see [himself] going down that route."

=== Release ===
VVVVVV was released on January 11, 2010, for Microsoft Windows and Mac OS X. A trial version of the game is playable on the website Kongregate. A Linux version was in development, but a number of technical difficulties arose in the porting process, which led Cavanagh to cancel it for the time being.

The game was rewritten in C++ by games developer Simon Roth in 2011, allowing Linux support to be successfully implemented. This formed version 2.0 of VVVVVV, launched on July 24, 2011, as part of the third Humble Indie Bundle. Version 2.0 also features support for custom levels, and a level editor. The C++ port also allowed for the implementation of new graphics modes and various speed improvements. Version 2.0, however, does not support saved games from the original Flash version of VVVVVV; many players received this update via Steam without warning, and hence were unable to continue their existing saved games.

Based on the source code of the C++ rewrite, it was also ported in 2011 for the Pandora, which requires files from the Microsoft Windows, Mac OS X or Linux version of the game to work.

On October 7, 2011, it was announced that a version of the game was being made for Nintendo 3DS by Nicalis. It was released on December 29, 2011, in North America and May 10, 2012, in Europe. The Nintendo 3DS version was eventually released in Japan on October 12, 2016, courtesy of Japanese publisher Pikii. In 2010, a demo of the game's early levels was ported to the Commodore 64 by programmer Paul Koller, with Cavanagh's assistance. In April 2017 a complete port to the Commodore 64 was released by developer Laxity.

On the 10th anniversary of the game's release in January 2020, Cavanagh made its source code publicly available on GitHub. This led to the development of Version 2.3, which was driven mainly by the community. Most of the work was done by one contributor, Misa Kai, who was later compensated by Cavanagh.

Version 2.4 was released on January 10, 2024, for the 14th anniversary. It contains a localization system, allowing for 21 new languages to be added.

=== Soundtrack ===
The soundtrack of VVVVVV was composed by chiptune musician Magnus Pålsson (also known as SoulEye). Cavanagh approached Pålsson to compose VVVVVV after playing Space Phallus, an indie game by Charlie's Games, which featured a song by him. Pålsson wrote on the Distractionware blog that, upon playing Cavanagh's previous games, he was "amazed at the depth that came with the games, even though they were small and short." In writing the music for VVVVVV, Pålsson aimed to make "uptempo happy songs that would ingrain themselves into your minds whether you want to or not, hopefully so much so that you’d go humming on them when not playing, and making you want to come back to the game even more." The complete soundtrack, titled PPPPPP, was released on January 10, 2010, alongside VVVVVV and is sold as a music download or CD on Pålsson's personal website. On June 12, 2014, Pålsson released a power metal version of the soundtrack titled MMMMMM which was arranged and performed by guitarist Jules Conroy. The album contains a mod file to replace the in-game music with the metal tracks. Video game record label Materia Collective released a 180g picture disc vinyl LP edition on January 11, 2020.

All tracks are written by SoulEye.

No.	Title	Length
1.	"Powerup"	0:05
2.	"Presenting VVVVVV"	2:43
3.	"Pause"	0:10
4.	"Pushing Onwards"	3:42
5.	"Path Complete"	0:10
6.	"Passion for Exploring"	2:55
7.	"Positive Force"	2:51
8.	"Predestined Fate"	2:13
9.	"Phear"	0:20
10.	"Potential for Anything"	3:45
11.	"Pressure Cooker"	3:30
12.	"Plenary"	0:23
13.	"Pipe Dream"	2:24
14.	"Popular Potpourri"	6:12
15.	"Positive Force (Reversed)"	2:51
16.	"Waiting for VVVVVV"	0:59
Total length:		35:13

== Reception ==
Reception

Aggregate score
Aggregator	Score
Metacritic	PC: 81/100; 3DS: 83/100 iOS: 95/100; NS: 80/100

Review scores
Publication	Score
Destructoid	PC: 10/10
Famitsu	3DS: 7/10, 8/10, 8/10, 7/10
GamesRadar+	8/10
IGN	7.5/10
TouchArcade	5/5

VVVVVV has been generally well received by critics, earning a score of 81/100 for the Windows version and 83/100 for the 3DS version on review aggregator website Metacritic. The game was noted for being the first important independent release of 2010; Kieron Gillen of Rock, Paper, Shotgun called it "the first great Indie game of the year", while Michael Rose, writing for IndieGames.com, noted that the release of VVVVVV followed a year which "some may argue...didn't really deliver an outstanding indie title which showed the mainstream that independent developers mean business." The level design of VVVVVV was lauded by critics: Rose considered the game to have no filler content, which he found to be "one of the game's strongest points". Michael McWhertor of gaming news blog Kotaku wrote that the game's areas contained "a surprising amount of variation throughout...ensuring that VVVVVV never feels like its designer failed to explore the gameplay possibilities."

A number of reviewers wrote of VVVVVV's high level of difficulty. McWhertor found that "the game's trial and error moments can seriously test one's patience." However, several critics noted that the game's challenge is made less frustrating due to its numerous checkpoints, as well as the player's ability to retry after dying as many times as needed. These additions made VVVVVV "not unforgiving", according to IGN staff writer Samuel Claiborn, while still being "old-school in its demands of player dedication". A review in Famitsu noted that while the game was difficult, it was not stressful. IGN's Matthew Adler named VVVVVV the 12th hardest modern game, saying it requires quick reflexes in order to survive and that players will likely die many times.

The price of VVVVVV when it was originally released was $15. This was seen by McWhertor as being the game's "one unfortunate barrier" to entry: "While there's plenty to see and do after blazing through the game's core campaign, the steeper than expected asking price will probably turn some off." Likewise, Gillen wrote in his review that the cost "does strike you as a lot for an Indie lo-fi platformer", while insisting that "it is worth the money". Since its original release, the price of VVVVVV has been reduced to $5. On his blog, Cavanagh said that the decision was difficult to make, but added, "I know that the original price of $15 was off putting for a lot of people".

VVVVVV was awarded the IndieCade 2010 award for "Most Fun and Compelling" game in October 2010. Game development blog Gamasutra honored VVVVVV in its year-end independent games awards, which earned second place in 2009 and an honorable mention in 2010. The game's protagonist, Captain Viridian, is a playable character in the Windows version of the platform game Super Meat Boy.
