= Daniel Savio =

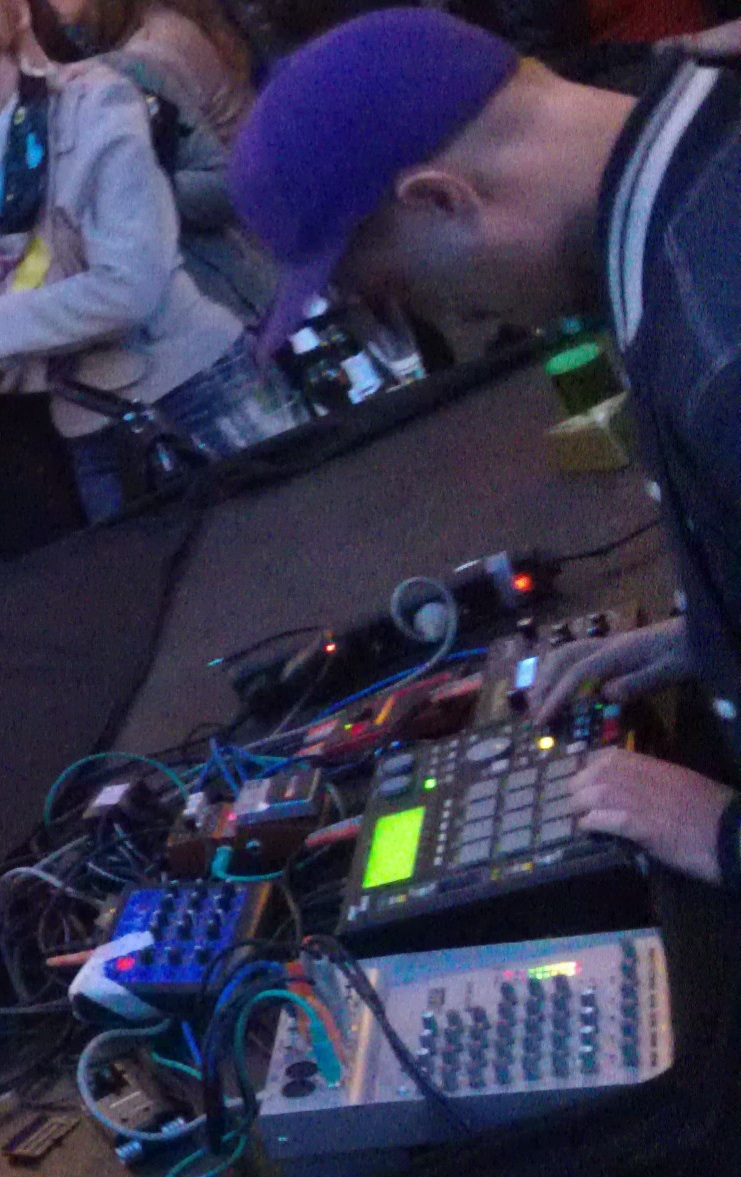
- Savio in May 2012.

Background information
- Born: Daniel Savio; 6 April 1978 (age 48)
- Origin: Södermalm, Stockholm, Sweden
- Genres: Electronic, Skweee, IDM
- Occupations: Musician, composer, remixer
- Instruments: Synthesizers, piano, electronics, drum machine, sequencer, sampler, turntables
- Years active: 1999–present
- Labels: House Of Wisdom; Flogsta Danshall; Flora & Fauna; Dødpop; Losonofono; MYOR; Poisonous Gases; Disques Mazout; Permanent Vacation
- Website: danielsavio.com (archived at Wayback Machine)

Daniel Savio (born 6 April 1978), is a Swedish electronic musician, composer and DJ. He is recognized as the originator of the genre term skweee, describing the sparse electronic music style initially released on Scandinavian record label Flogsta Danshall. With their release of the single "The Bubble Bump" in 2006, the label also debuted Daniel Savio's solo material.

== Early life ==
Born to artist parents, Daniel Savio was encouraged to embrace creativity early in life. The record collections of his uncle's and cousin's made music his starting point. While focusing entirely on DJing, his Stockholm childhood and early teenage years involved brief encounters with breakdancing and graffiti. Savings from a summer job at the age of fourteen gave him access to a sampler. The first music he produced were beats made for himself to rap to.

== Career ==
Following high school, Daniel would go on to form the electro and dub techno group Hundarna Från Söder with friends Aksel Friberg and Tor Löwkrantz. As a member of Hundarna Från Söder, Savio was awarded the Swedish Grammis (Club/Dance) in 2004 for the trio's self-titled debut album. The group was also nominated at the Sveriges Radio P3 Guld awards, as well as the independent Manifest awards. After two albums, and after no real disbanding of the group (in an interview Daniel Savio stated that "it just fizzled out"), Savio continued producing and recording music as a solo artist.

While departing from making music with Hundarna Från Söder, Savio simultaneously started releasing music under his birth name – as well as under the alias "Kool DJ Dust". As Kool DJ Dust he produced the mix and re-edit concept album "The Disco Opera" using samples sourced from obscure European prog- and disco-influenced fusion. The album was released locally on label High Feelings, along with an EP called "The Space Opera". Following the wider re-release of the CD mix album on Service, Pitchfork gave plaudits to the album, comparing "The Disco Opera" to the music of Todd Terje and The Avalanches. Svenska Dagbladet proclaimed Daniel, in the guise of Kool DJ Dust, as "...a Swedish DJ Shadow in terms of the sampling of collages of vinyl, or a one-man Radio Soulwax intertwining the most remarkable combinations of tunes into a suddenly logic entity". In conjunction with the release of "The Disco Opera", Daniel cited influences like Italian composer Dario Argento. He also explained how he endured listening through piles of cheap LPs by saying "it is no worse listening to a bad record from 1972 than it is to listen to the radio on any given day".

== Musical style ==
Daniel Savio "Revolt" (2012)
For the song "Revolt" (2012) a single synth was used for creating all the sounds of the song.

A technique employed by Daniel Savio is committing himself to using a single synthesizer in the making of an entire song, or even full collections of songs. Using this method, the drum sounds, melodies, bass rhythms, pads and sequencing of a track may all be done using just one piece of hardware. The original purpose of the synthesizer in use would typically be considered insufficient for the purpose of making detailed and complete songs.

Savio's music has been compared to productions by Timbaland and Neptunes, echoing early 2000s R&B to a greater degree than his skweee counterparts.

== Selected discography ==
While Savio's solo albums have had digital releases, a longtime preferred format for his singles were 7-inch vinyl. Several releases on his own House Of Wisdom imprint have been 12" vinyl and have been geared more towards house music with an electronic disco influence. Other labels which released records by Savio include Flogsta Danshall, Permanent Vacation, Flora & Fauna, Romb, Dødpop, Harmönia and Losonofono.

Studio albums (as Daniel Savio)

- Dirty Bomb (2009)
- Nekropolis (2010)
- Daniel Savio (2012)
- Ill Eagle (2013)
- Against All Odds (2014)
- Plejjern från Plejaderna (2017)
- Zodiaken (2019)
- Hip Hop (2021)
- Phase II (2022)
- Breakage (2023)
- Skweeeefrigerator (2023)
- Soda Popp Kid (2023)
- Pyramid Scheme (2024)
- Brain Freeze (2024)

DJ mix albums (as Kool DJ Dust)

- The Disco Opera (2008)

Studio albums (as member of Hundarna Från Söder)

- Hundarna Från Söder (2003)
- Troika (2005)

Studio work

- As a turntablist, Daniel Savio is the credited performer on Britney Spears' "Overprotected".
