= The Husbands (TV series) =

Upcoming Apple TV dramedy series

- Genre: Comedy drama
- Created by: Miriam Battye
- Based on: The Husbands by Holly Gramazio
- Written by: Miriam Battye
- Starring: Juno Temple
- Countries of origin: United Kingdom; United States
- Original language: English

Production
- Executive producers: Miriam Battye; Holly Gramazio; Craig Gillespie; Annie Marter
- Production companies: Fortunate Jack Productions; A24

Original release
- Network: Apple TV

The Husbands is an upcoming comedy drama television series for Apple TV starring Juno Temple. It is written and executive produced by Mariam Battye, and based on the novel of the same name by Holly Gramazio.

== Plot ==
Lauren is greeted at the door by her husband, Michael, after returning to her London flat. There's only one problem — she's never seen this man before in her life.

== Cast ==
- Juno Temple as Lauren
- Joe Alwyn
- Richard Gadd
- Kingsley Ben-Adir
- Joel Kinnaman
- Daniel Ings
- Bob Morley
- Fehinti Balogun
- Naomi Wirthner as Edie

== Production ==
=== Development ===
In April 2025, Apple TV ordered an 8-episode television series adaptation of Holly Gramazio’s novel The Husbands. Mariam Battye is the lead writer and Craig Gillespie is the lead director. The executive producers are Gillespie and Annie Marter via their Fortunate Jack Productions, Battye, Gramazio, and A24.

=== Casting ===
In April 2025, Juno Temple joined the series as the main character Lauren. Joe Alwyn, Richard Gadd, Kingsley Ben-Adir, Joel Kinnaman, Daniel Ings, Bob Morley and Fehinti Balogun joined the cast in April 2026.

=== Filming ===
In August 2026, it was reported that Juno Temple wrapped her filming of the series.
