= Skweee =

Musical genre with Scandinavian origins

- Stylistic origins: Electro; chiptune; minimal techno; funk; contemporary R&B; soul; Middle Eastern rhythms
- Cultural origins: Late 2000s, Sweden and Finland
- Typical instruments: Synthesizer

7" skweee singles on sale at the Norberg Festival 2009 in Sweden

Skweee is a musical style, with origin in Sweden and Finland. Skweee combines simple synth/chiptune leads and basslines with funk, R&B or soul-like rhythms, overall rendering a stripped-down funky sound. The tracks are predominantly instrumental.

== Origins ==
The name "skweee" was coined by Daniel Savio, one of the originators of the emerging sound. The name refers to the use of analog synthesizers in the production process, where the aim is to "squeeze out" the most interesting sounds possible.

Producers can vary from high-profile to new talent from the Scandinavian electronica environment.

== Recognition ==
The major outlets of skweee music are the Swedish record label Flogsta Danshall and Finnish record label Harmönia. Norwegian Dødpop, Canadian Ancient Robot, US Losonofono, US Titched, US Poisonous Gases, Spanish Lo Fi Funk, Finnish Mässy, and French Mazout have since been added to this family. The preferred media format of skweee enthusiasts is the 7" vinyl record. Early releases were exclusively released in this format. More recently, however, a series of 12" vinyl records, digital releases and CD compilations have been released through these outlets as well.

The increasing notability of the skweee genre has resulted in releases such as the Eero Johannes album on Planet Mu. Producers such as Rusko, Gemmy, Joker, Zomby, and Rustie have given their take on the sound, resulting in several releases on the boundary between skweee and dubstep.
