= Dr. Knugelmeister =

Studio album by Komplett Arnold
- Released: 1991
- Recorded: April–May 1991
- Genre: Punk rock
- Producer: Fredrik Findahl

Komplett Arnold chronology
Dr. Knugelmeister (1991)	Hometown Revolution (1992)

Dr. Knugelmeister is the debut album by Swedish punk rock band Komplett Arnold. It was recorded in April to May 1991 and was released the same year. The album was remastered in 1998. The no longer available MC edition contained lyrics and fan photos in black and white.

== Track listing ==
(All songs are written by Komplett Arnold except where noted)

=== Cassette ===
==== Side A ====
1. "On the Edge"
2. "Gruesome Sunday Morning"
3. "That's Just the Way It Is"
4. "Crazy World"
5. "California Sun"
6. "House of Insanity"
7. "I Wanna Be A Susaphone"
8. "The Beauty Is In the Beholders Eyes"
9. "Kill the Bandits"
10. "Death of Me"
11. "Blitzkrieg Bop" (Dee Dee Ramone, Tommy Ramone)

==== Side B ====
1. "Shotgun Maniac"
2. "That's What I Call Rock'N Roll"
3. "Eat It"
4. "Time Bomb"
5. "Through the Desert"
6. "Turn Off the News"
7. "Cold Mind"
8. "Through the Town"
9. "To the Sky"
10. "Börjes Moppe"

=== CD ===
1. "On the Edge"
2. "Gruesome Sunday Morning"
3. "That's Just the Way It Is"
4. "Crazy World"
5. "California Sun"
6. "House of Insanity"
7. "I Wanna Be A Susaphone"
8. "The Beauty Is In the Beholders Eyes"
9. "Kill the Bandits"
10. "Death of Me"
11. "Blitzkrieg Bop" (Dee Dee Ramone, Tommy Ramone)
12. "Shotgun Maniac"
13. "That's What I Call Rock'N Roll"
14. "Eat It"
15. "Time Bomb"
16. "Through the Desert"
17. "Turn Off the News"
18. "Through the Town"
19. "To the Sky"
20. "Börjes Moppe"
21. "Selling Dogfood" (bonus track)
22. "Norberg Blues" (bonus track)

== Personnel ==
- Per Findahl – guitar
- Fredrik Findahl – guitar, vocals
- Daniel Wiik – bass, vocals
- Fredrik Haglund - drums
