= Norberg =

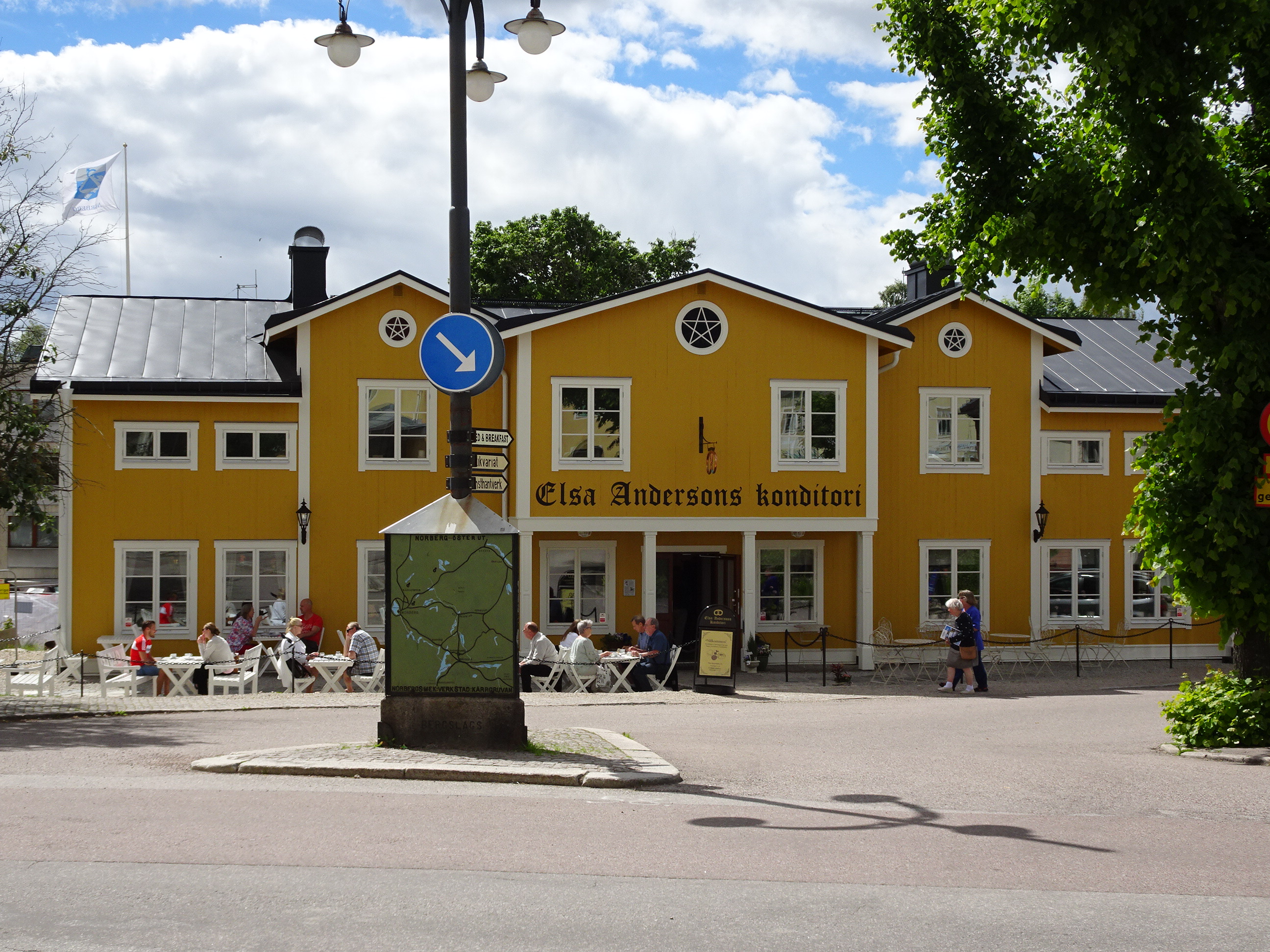
- Elsa Andersons konditori in Norberg

- Location within Västmanland Location within Sweden
- Coordinates: 60°05′N 15°57′E
- Country: Sweden
- Province: Västmanland
- County: Västmanland County
- Municipality: Norberg Municipality

Area
  - Total: 8.09 km^{2} (3.12 sq mi)

Population (31 December 2015)
  - Total: 6,969
  - Density: 690/km^{2} (1,800/sq mi)
- Time zone: UTC+1 (CET)
  - Summer (DST): UTC+2 (CEST)
- Website: http://www.norberg.se

Norberg (Swedish pronunciation: [ˈnûːrbærj]) is a locality and the seat of Norberg Municipality in Västmanland County, Sweden with 4,518 inhabitants in 2010. Best known for the Norbergfestival which is Scandinavias biggest electronic music festival, organized in an old iron ore mine. Norberg consists of two large parts, the actual Norberg in the south and Kärrgruvan (Marsh Mine) in the north, along with smaller settlements scattered around the area.

== History ==
Iron-making in Norberg can be traced back to the 6th century, but the area has been populated since the Nordic Stone Age.

The blast furnace plant at Lapphyttan, probably originates from the 11–1200s (currently under reconstruction elsewhere), shows the beginning of the mining community that grew up in Bergslagen. In the Middle Ages, Norberg was a marketplace where mountain men in the surrounding districts gathered.

The oldest preserved buildings in Norberg are in Norbergsån, the area around Norberg church with farms that originate from the Middle Ages, while many current buildings are from the 18th century. The oldest parts of Norberg's church, including the vaults, date from the 13th century. The interior was changed after a big fire in 1727 and the church tower was rebuilt in 1904. In the cemetery is a bone chamber from the 18th century.

Despite an extensive fire in the mid-18th century, one can still see the original settlement pattern in central Norberg with booths, laundries and a wash-house along the river, while farm houses and residential buildings are nearby.

In the 1970s, raw molten iron was transported by rail from the blast furnaces at Spännarhyttan to the steelworks at Surahammar. Spännarhyttans blast furnace was shut down for good in 1981.

== Landmarks ==
Elsa Andersons Konditori is a historic pastry shop. Formerly a hostelry, it was founded in 1916 and is located next to the square in Norberg. It has been awarded with a diploma from the Gastronomy Academy. On 21 August 2015 it was totally destroyed by a fire but it reopened in 2017.

== See also ==
- Norbergite
- Engelsberg-Norberg Railway - Preserved railway run by enthusiasts, based in nearby Kärrgruvan with a station at Norberg
- Mas (Swedish term)
