= Super Hexagon =

2012 video game

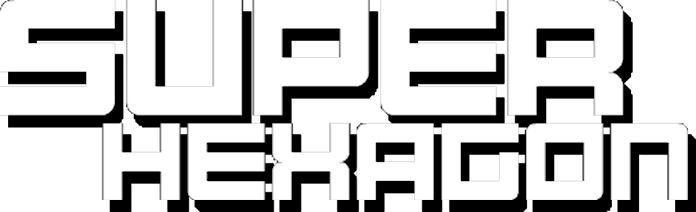
- Publisher: Terry Cavanagh
- Designer: Terry Cavanagh
- Composer: Chipzel
- Platforms: Windows, OS X, Linux, iOS, Android, BlackBerry 10
- Release: iOS: WW: September 6, 2012; Windows, Mac: WW: November 27, 2012; Android: WW: January 19, 2013; BlackBerry 10: WW: February 16, 2013; GNU/Linux: WW: February 27, 2013
- Genre: Action
- Mode: Single-player

Super Hexagon is an action video game created by independent developer Terry Cavanagh with music composed by Chipzel. Originally released for iOS in September 2012, versions for Windows and macOS were released three months later. Android, BlackBerry and Linux versions followed in early 2013.

The game is based on an earlier prototype by Cavanagh, simply titled Hexagon, which was created for a twelve-hour game jam in early 2012.

== Gameplay ==
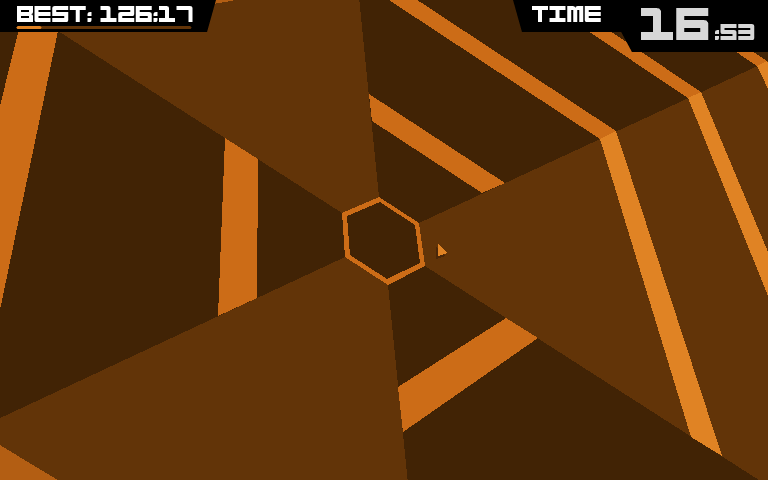
A screenshot of Super Hexagon on Windows

Super Hexagon is a game in which the player controls a triangle on a hexagonal grid in the center while walls come from the edges of the screen. The player must pivot their triangle left or right into an opening in order to survive. The ultimate goal of the game is to survive as long as possible, beating the player's previous record, and the entire level must be restarted if the player makes a mistake. The pace of the game progressively gets more difficult the longer the player has survived and to distract players, the game features a chiptune soundtrack, walls that occasionally change direction, and the playfield will constantly spin in different directions and may also occasionally change color. The game contains three main difficulty levels, respectively "Hexagon", "Hexagoner", and "Hexagonest", beginning at hard, harder, and hardest. Additionally, "Hyper" versions of the previous stages can be unlocked by surviving for over sixty seconds on a level, with their difficulties increasing to "hardester", "hardestest", and "hardestestest" in that order.

== Development ==
Super Hexagon started off as a prototype titled Hexagon, made and released in one day for the late February 2012 game jam Pirate Kart V. Designer Terry Cavanagh saw potential in the project and decided to increase the game's difficulty and expand upon its concept. Cavanagh has stated that he is "not much of a visual artist," thus settling on a minimal look quickly. The visuals of Super Hexagon are barely different from its original Hexagon iteration.

During development, Cavanagh made various changes based on "what felt good", before starting the beta testing process. Cavanagh found that anyone could beat the game once they get better reflexes and a better understanding of the game's mechanics.

Super Hexagon is voiced by journalist Jenn Frank. Cavanagh intended to use a professional voice actor, but did not like their results and returned to Frank, the voice of Hexagon, to reprise the role. Frank stated that, when a game like Super Hexagon is almost entirely created by a single person, it can become a very personal piece of work; "a product of thousands of tiny decisions, and every one is the reflection of the person who made it, what they're like, and what they think about."

=== Music ===
Super Hexagon

EP by Chipzel
- Released: September 6, 2012
- Genres: Video game soundtrack, chiptune
- Length: 8:31

After Cavanagh used Chipzel's track "Courtesy" in the original Hexagon game, he again sought to use her music in the full game Super Hexagon. Chipzel agreed, and created a three-track chiptune soundtrack that was subsequently released as Super Hexagon EP. The soundtrack again included the track "Courtesy", as well as "Focus" from Chipzel's previous album Phonetic Symphony and a new track titled "Otis". Each track corresponded to a level in the game: "Courtesy" was used on the Hexagon level, "Otis" on the Hexagoner level, and "Focus" on the Hexagonest level. When a level in Super Hexagon is restarted, the track always starts off at a random place in order to keep players from feeling like they have to start back from the beginning every time.

In late 2015, the EP was re-released on hexagonal vinyl.

== Reception ==
Reception

Aggregate score
| Aggregator | Score |
|---|---|
| Metacritic | PC: 88/100 iOS: 86/100 |

Review score
| Publication | Score |
|---|---|
| TouchArcade | iOS: 4.5/5 |

Super Hexagon has received a positive critical response with a score of 86/100 on review aggregator website Metacritic for the iOS version and 88/100 for the Windows version.

The game was the runner-up for Apple's App Store "Best of 2012" Game of the Year and was a finalist for the 2013 Independent Games Festival Excellence in Design award (which went to FTL: Faster Than Light) with an Honorable Mention for the Seumas McNally Grand Prize. It was also nominated for "British Game" in the British Academy Video Games Awards in 2013.

== Legacy ==
Vittorio Romeo developed Open Hexagon, a spiritual successor designed to be easily customisable. In May 2021, Terry Cavanagh praised the project in a tweet reading "It's really cool to see that Open Hexagon is still getting regular updates, all these years later - if you liked Super Hexagon and you're interested in what a community driven version looks like, check it out!"
