= Psilodump =

Electronic musician

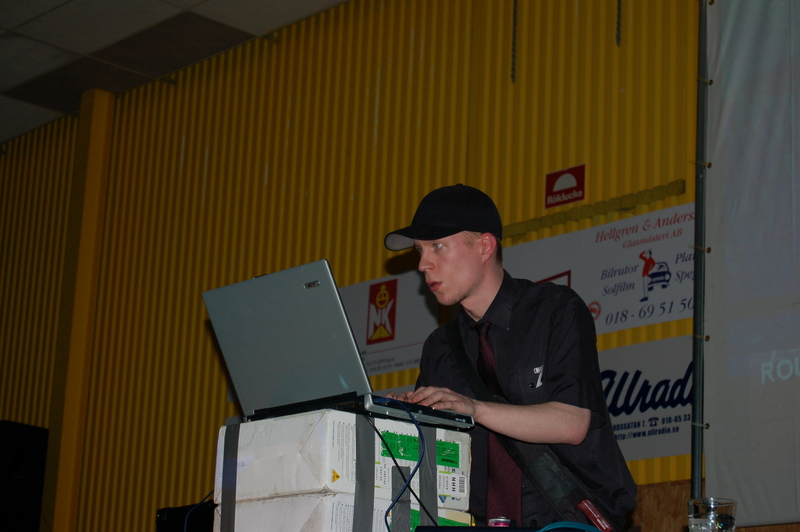
- Psilodump playing live at the Birdie computer festival in 2006

Background information
- Born: Simon Rahm; 15 December 1980 (age 45)
- Origin: Stockholm, Sweden
- Genres: Chiptune, experimental, IDM, electro, house, breakbeat, big beat, drum n bass, tech house, acid house
- Occupations: Musician, DJ, producer
- Labels: 476 Records, domizil, Sound of Habib, Q-Records, Kahvi Collective, Micromusic, 8bitpeoples, Eclectro, X-Dump, Candy Mind, Monotonik, Ninjani Diskus, Demon Tea Recordings, Data Airlines
- Website: www.psilodump.com

Simon Rahm (born 15 December 1980), known professionally as Psilodump (/ˈsaɪ.loʊˌdʌmp/; stylized as psilodump), is a Swedish musician, DJ, and producer based in Stockholm. He has also released work under his real name and as Psilodumputer, Pushiro, and J.Panic.

== Biography ==
Rahm began making music at the age of 11 on an Amiga 500 computer and later an Amiga 1200 before moving to a PC, synthesizers, and other musical equipment. His first live gigs were at local community events, which he described as an inappropriate context for his energetic performances. In the late 1990s he became involved in the rave scene, playing both illegal and legal events. The "psilo-" prefix of his stage name comes from rave drug culture. Before becoming a music professional Rahm worked as a computer service technician.

In addition to Psilodump, Rahm released the 2001 Full of SID/Microcompo Remixes EP, a tribute to the SID Commodore 64 sound chip, under the name Psilodumputer, and when DJing has gone by J.Panic.

In 2003 Rahm co-founded The X-Dump, a Swedish electronic music collective and record label with Din Stalker, Dorothy's Magic Bag, and his brother, Paza Rahm.

He has toured extensively, playing a number of notable events including Peace & Love, Stockholm Pride, Blip Festival, and Norbergfestival.

== Musical style ==
Psilodump - "Jag Minns Inte (Original Mix)"
A sample of "Jag Minns Inte (Original Mix)" from the Memory Loss album (2004)

Psilodump - Psilodumputer
A sample of "Psilodumputer" from the Psilodumputer album (2006)

Psilodump has been closely associated with chiptune music since becoming acquainted with the genre through the Micromusic community in 2000. Several of his albums have been released through chiptune-related labels, including Micromusic and 8bitpeoples, though he has expressed distaste for most chiptune music and critical of what he sees as simplistic tendencies among some of the musicians who make it.

He has cited as musical influences Aphex Twin, Pink Floyd, Nine Inch Nails, Orbital, Kraftwerk, Squarepusher, Cylob, Die Krupps, Hardfloor, Yello, System of a Down, Laibach, David Bowie, Westbam, Björk, Hallucinogen, Moby, and Din Stalker.

== Discography ==
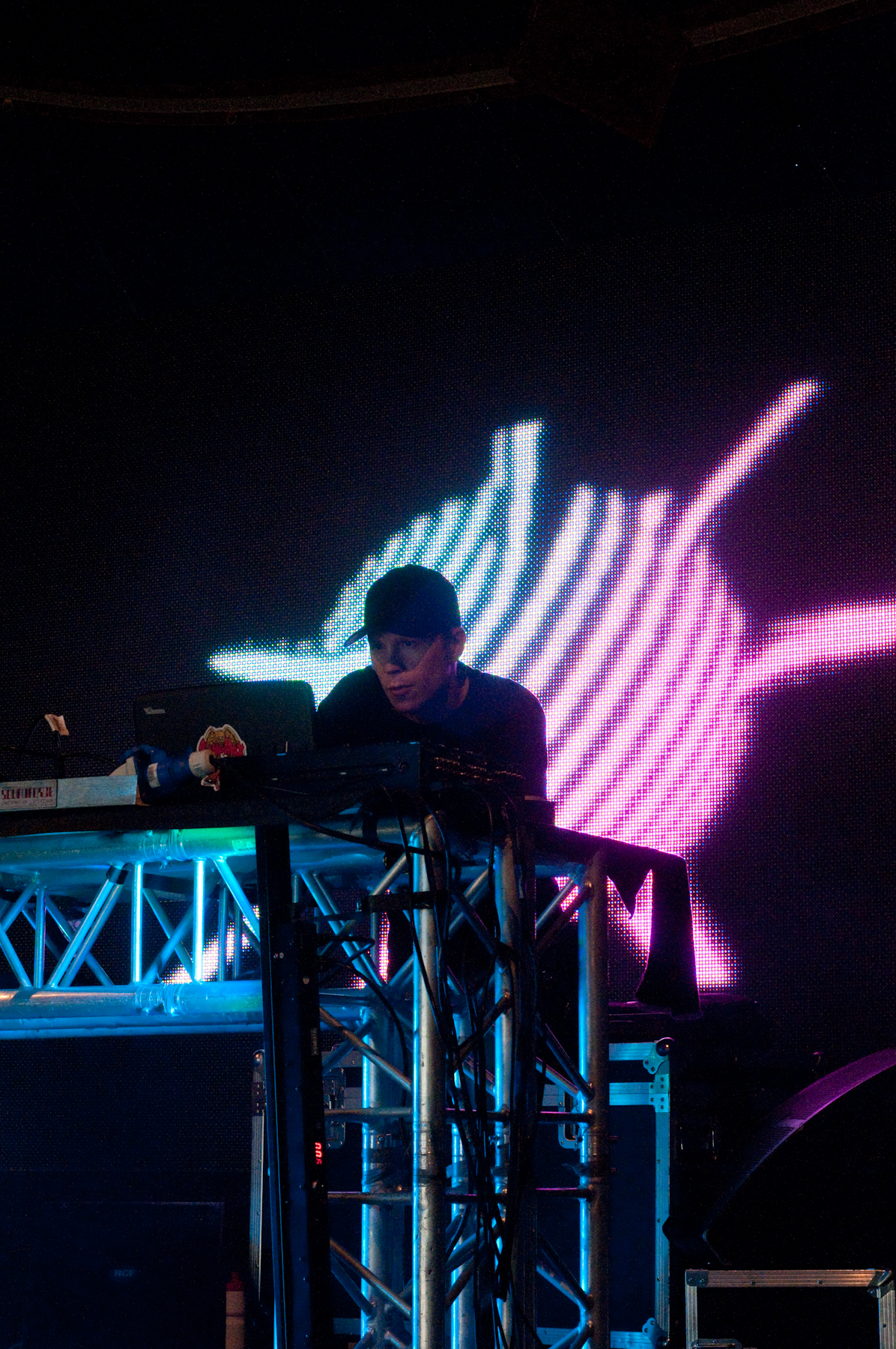
Psilodump at the Peace & Love festival in 2009

Rahm began releasing music in the late 1990s through his own 476 Records label, largely using CD-Rs. His earliest known work from the mid-1990s, under the name Pushiro, was remastered and released on the Art of Realistix label in 2005. He used the name Psilodumputer for his first non-476 Records album, the 2001 EP Full of SID / Microcompo Remixes on the Domizil label. The 2002 Gamma EP, released through Sound of Habib, was the first official title bearing the Psilodump name, which he would use predominantly thereafter. Premonition Magazine described Gamma as an "innovating and well arranged mix between IDM, Tech, and Bitpop," and said of the new artist "this young man should go a long way."

Psilodump went on to have his music published on CD, vinyl, and online, by several labels, such as Sound of Habib, Q-Records, Kahvi Collective, Micromusic, 8bitpeoples, Eclectro Records, Candy Mind Records, Monotonik, Ninjani Diskus, Demon Tea Recordings, Data Airlines, as well as Rahm's affiliated labels 476 Records and X-DuMP3.

Though typically prolific, other than a few tracks under his real name Rahm did not put out new music between 2006 and 2009, when he released The Nya Albumet ("The New Album"), which Zero Magazine called "both danceable and extremely friendly listening."

Many works by Psilodump are Creative Commons licensed and available for free on several websites, including Archive.org.

=== List of works ===
- 476 Volume 1: You're Not Eating It, It's Eating You (476, 1999)
- 476 Volume 2: Psychoactive Sonic Extracted From My Brain (476, 1999)
- 476 Volume 3: Hellbender (476, 1999)
- 476 Volume 4: Psilophytondapsile (476, 2000)
- 476 Volume 5: *Not-Maybe-Could-Had* (476, 2000)
- 476 Volume 6: The Light Is the Biggest Lie (476, 2000)
- Full of SID / Microcompo Remixes EP (as Psilodumputer) (Domizil, 2001)
- Gamma EP (Sound of Habib, 2002)
- Symptom EP (Sound of Habib, 2003)
- Melia EP (Kahvi Collective, 2003)
- Yo Joe Hoe (Micromusic, 2003)
- Memory Loss (8bitpeoples, 2004)
- Washed (Eclectro, 2004)
- Modify (as Pushiro) (The Art Of Realistix, 2005)
- Collecting Shit (as Pushiro) (The Art Of Realistix, 2005)
- Drop the Kontrabas (as Pushiro) (The Art Of Realistix, 2005)
- You Sick Little Monkey (X-DuMP3, 2005)
- Sov Gott (Candy Mind, 2005)
- Jag Och Psilodump (Monotonik, 2005)
- The Night I Lost You All You All (Candy Mind, 2005)
- Psilodumputer (Ninjani Diskus, 2006)
- Room With No Exit EP (Candy Mind, 2006)
- Never Heal (476, 2006)
- Behind the False Smile (X-DuMP3, 2006)
- Mutiny of the Robots (8bitpeoples, 2006)
- Tetrapoda EP (as Simon Rahm) (WikRahm, 2008)
- Scyphozoa (as Simon Rahm) (WikRahm, 2008)
- Elkabel (WikRahm, 2008)
- Muikku (476, 2008)
- Hidden Trains of Pippuri (476, 2009)
- The Nya Albumet (Demon Tea, 2009)
- The Return of the Snabelnauts (476, 2009)
- Brains / Never Heal Uncut (476, 2009)
- 2009-12-19: Blip Festival 2009, The Bell House, Brooklyn, NY, USA (Free Music Archive, 2010)
- The Somnambulist (476, 2010)
- The Droidwhatever EP (X-DuMP3, 2010)
- The Almost Black EP (476, 2011)
- Metronomnomnom (8bitpeoples, 2011)
- Drop (Data Airlines, 2012)
- Kanon (476, 2012)
- What Mind (476, 2012)
- The Nearly Island (476, 2013)
- Whut (476, 2013)
- Drunk Hypnotist (476, 2013)
- Smask (476, 2013)
- Ryck (476, 2013)
- Nine (476, 2014)
- Låtsades Krama Remixes (476, 2014)
- Jag Minns Inte Remixes (476, 2014)
- Wefosi (476, 2015)
- The Ground (476, 2018)
- Kanske Lite (476, 2019)
