= Holly Gramazio =

Australian-born UK-based writer, game designer and curator

- Born: 1981 (age 44–45); Adelaide, South Australia
- Education: University of Adelaide (PhD)
- Occupations: Writer, game designer, curator
- Known for: The Husbands; Now Play This
- Website: https://www.hollygramazio.net/

Holly Gramazio is an Australian writer, game designer and curator based in London. Her first novel, The Husbands, was a New York Times bestseller. The novel was adapted for an upcoming television series by Miriam Battye, starring Juno Temple. The games festival she founded, Now Play This, was part of the London Games Festival during its ten-year life.

== Biography ==
Gramazio moved to London after her PhD in Creative Writing.

In 2015 she founded Now Play This, a festival of experimental games at Somerset House, as part of the London Games Festival, with V Buckenham, and directed it until 2019.

In 2018 she was credited as co-writer on Bernie De Koven's last book The Infinite Playground for MIT Press when he was unable to finish it due to illness.

In 2019 she wrote the script for Dicey Dungeons, which went on to win an IndieCade Grand Jury Prize.

The Husbands, her first novel was published in April 2024 and reached no 12 on the NYT list. Its premise - a woman comes home to find her attic produces an infinite variety of husbands - was described by the Times as "a brilliant satire on the Tinder generation" A television adaptation was in production by Apple TV and A24, starring actors including Juno Temple, Tom Basden, Joe Wilkinson and Gemma Whelan.

The book was parodied on The Simpsons' "Treehouse of Horror XXXVII", where Homer goes into the shed and Marge gets new husbands at random.
