= Skudge =

Swedish musical duo

Skudge is a music duo from Stockholm, Sweden, producing techno music.

2011 they won the Sveriges Radio P3 Guld award (Sveriges Radio P3 is a public radio station in Sweden) within the category dance of the year. This prize is awarded at the P3 Gold Awards in January of each year to artists whose CDs were released over the past Swedish music year. The awards ceremony is broadcast in Swedish public service television and radio; the prize consists of a statuette of gold and broken glass, designed by Anton Gårdsäter.

== Album ==
- Phantom, Skudge Records 2010
- Balancing Point, Skudge Records 2016

== Singles and EP ==
- Depth Buffering EP (12", EP), alphahouse 2009
- Melodrama / Ontic, Skudge Records 2010
- Instrumentals, Skudge Records 2010
- Convolution / Contamination, Skudge Records 2010
- Overture / Mirage, Skudge Records 2010
- Skudge Remixes Part 2 (12", Ltd), Skudge Records 2010
- Skudge Remixes Part 1 (12", Ltd), Skudge Records 2010
- Skudge Remixes Part 3, Skudge Records 2010
- Below / Phantom, Skudge Records 2010
