= Ten Thousand Free Men & Their Families =

Australian musical project

- Origin: Sydney, NSW, Australia
- Genres: Electronic music, chiptune, punk
- Instrument: Nintendo Game Boy
- Years active: 2007–present
- Members: Thomas Gilmore
- Website: 10kfreemen.com

Ten Thousand Free Men & Their Families (also known as 10k or 10kfreemen) is a musical project of Sydney based Game Boy music composer and performer Thomas Gilmore, who began writing music with the Nintendo Game Boy in 2007. Shortly after in 2008, Gilmore and Dot.AY from Brisbane started a blog documenting and promoting Australian chipmusic called GameBoyAustralia. In early 2011, Gilmore and Eugene Davoren-Britton launched a vinyl-only chipmusic label called Sounds Legit. The name for Gilmore's project was inspired by the A Lesson Is Learned But The Damage Is Irreversible webcomic of a similar title. Gilmore currently performs live vocals in a hardcore punk style that transcends the regular boundaries of chipmusic, to form a style of music that Gilmore calls "chipunk". In March 2016, after a period of silence from the act, a live band manifestation of Ten Thousand Free Men & Their Families played at Square Sounds Festival Melbourne.

== Discography ==
Ten Thousand Free Men & Their Families has released many recordings with netlabels in the past, but the discography listed on his website only includes releases that were released physically. Gilmore has stated this is because his physical releases are a huge departure from his previous work that he now considers to be demos. Both MKE OR BRK and Another were stocked by 8bitpeoples, a prominent chipmusic label. The Rite Now single was later stocked by the Milwaukee-based label, Radiograffiti.

=== Solo Releases ===
==== EPs ====
- MKE OR BRK (2010, Independent CD)
- Another (2010, Independent CD)

==== Singles ====
- Rite Now (2011, Independent 5" Vinyl)

=== Compilations ===
- (Triskaidekaphobia) 13,000.00 Milliseconds (2008, Ratskin Records, CD Compilation)
- Progfest 09, The Best of Aussie Prog (2009, Birds Robe, CD Compilation)
- Reformat: A Tribute To Bit Shifter's Information Chase (2011, 8bitpeoples, CD Compilation)
- ...And Then They Remixed Everything (2013, Birds Robe, CD/Digital Remix album for Sleepmakeswaves' ...And So We Destroyed Everything)

=== Web Releases and Demos ===
- 0.999... = 1 (2007)
- The Pokémon Song (2007)
- Glitch Village Vol. 1 (2007)
- Mario Paint EP (2008)
- PixlCrushr / Ten Thousand Free Men & Their Families Split (2008)
- Dot.AY / Ten Thousand Free Men & Their Families Split (2008)
- Glitch Village Vol. 2 (2008)
- DMGMite-01: The Australian Chipmusic Compilation, Volume I (2008)
- Chipsters: The Australian Chipmusic compilation, Volume II (2009)
- Blip Festival 2011 Live Recording (2011)
