= Norberg Municipality =

Norberg Municipality Norbergs kommun
- Municipality
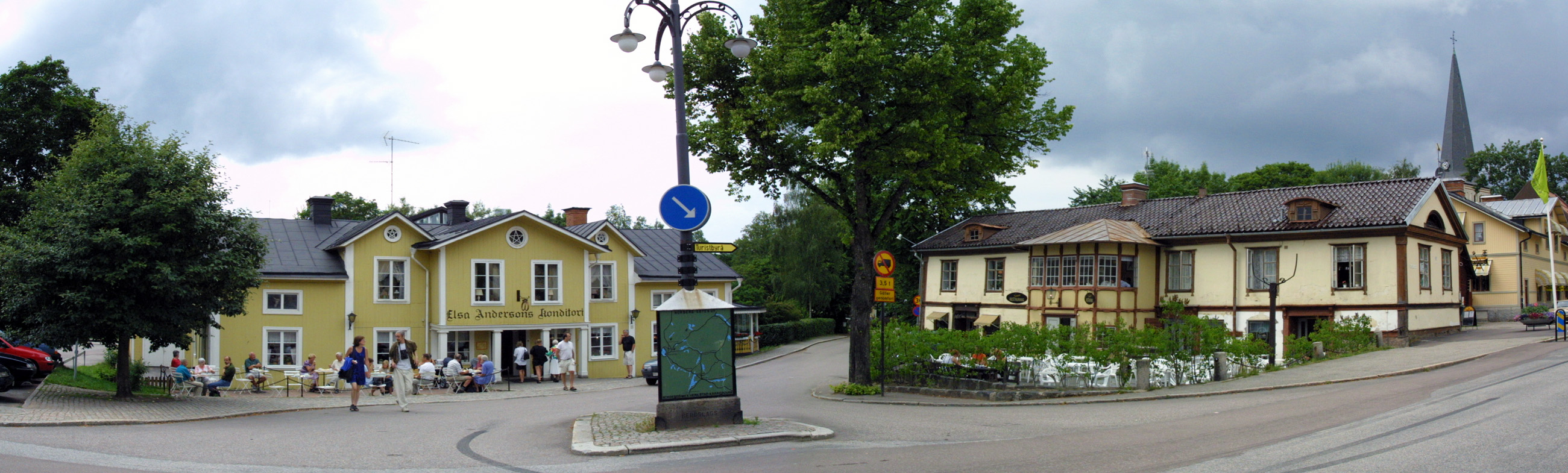

- Coat of arms

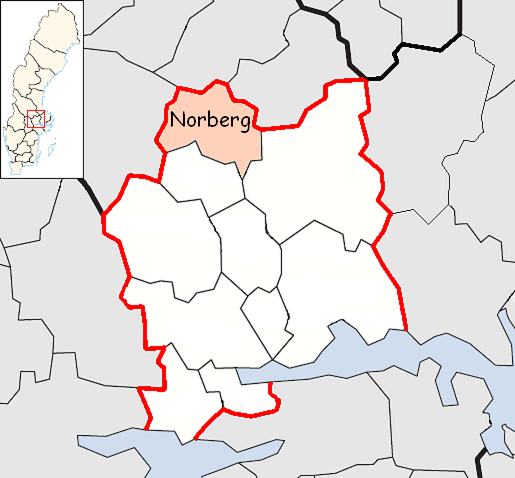
- Coordinates: 60°05′N 15°57′E
- Country: Sweden
- County: Västmanland County
- Seat: Norberg

Area
  - Total: 447.67 km^{2} (172.85 sq mi)
  - Land: 417.8 km^{2} (161.3 sq mi)
  - Water: 29.87 km^{2} (11.53 sq mi)
- Area as of 1 January 2014.

Population (30 June 2025)
  - Total: 5,421
  - Density: 12.98/km^{2} (33.61/sq mi)
- Time zone: UTC+1 (CET)
  - Summer (DST): UTC+2 (CEST)
- ISO 3166 code: SE
- Province: Västmanland
- Municipal code: 1962
- Website: www.norberg.se

Norberg Municipality (Swedish: Norbergs kommun) is a municipality in Västmanland County in central Sweden. Its seat is located in the town of Norberg.

== History ==
The area, located within Bergslagen, the mining district of central Sweden, has historically been a mining area directed at iron. In the 1970s, archeological finds traced the blast furnace in Lapphyttan to the 12th century, predating the earlier known with 300 years.

In the 1390s, Engelbrekt Engelbrektsson was born on a farm outside the town Norberg. He was later to lead notable freedom-rebellions in 1434 against the King.

The coat of arms was created in 1948, and was formally granted and registered as a municipal arms with the municipal reform of 1971. The lower half corresponds to the arms of Engelbrekt Engelbrektsson: Three half lilies in a triangle; the upper half is the sign of iron.

== Geography ==
Geographically the town is situated by the small rivulet Norbergsån, around which its oldest part, including the 14th century Norberg Church and the Mill, are situated. Several houses are from the 18th century.

== Demographics ==
This is a demographic table based on Norberg Municipality's electoral districts in the 2022 Swedish general election sourced from SVT's election platform, in turn taken from SCB official statistics.

In total there were 5,707 residents, including 4,352 Swedish citizens of voting age. 50.5% voted for the left coalition and 47.8% for the right coalition. Indicators are in percentage points except population totals and income.

Location	Residents	Citizen adults	Left vote	Right vote	Employed	Swedish parents	Foreign heritage	Income SEK	Degree
Location			%	%					
Björkängen	1,842	1,293	54.9	43.0	68	69	31	20,602	22
Karbenning	466	408	42.0	56.4	77	89	11	23,568	32
Kärrgruvan	1,225	929	47.1	51.1	82	83	17	25,893	26
Skallberget	2,174	1,722	52.0	46.8	81	85	15	23,929	24
Source: SVT

== Twin towns – sister cities ==
- Raasiku Parish, Estonia
