= Dare to Be Digital =

Internationally video game development competition and talent development programme

Dare to be Digital is a video games design competition targeted at university students and recent graduates, started by and held at Abertay University, Scotland since 2000.

Teams (typically of 5 university undergraduates or fresh graduates) work together in a microcosm of a games development company at their home or within their home university to develop a prototype of a new video game. Teams have 9 weeks from the start of the competition to finish their game although it can be in production for up to a year prior to starting.

The main objective is to help students gain real life working experience as a multi-disciplinary group. Mentoring support is provided by game industry professionals. The competition culminates at Dare Protoplay, an indie games festival in which the games made by Dare Contestants are the main event and can be voted on by the public. Entrants are provided free accommodation for the duration of Dare Protoplay by Abertay University.

Entrance to the competition is based upon each team's ability and the nature of the game concept. This is measured against three criteria: creativity, market potential, and use of technology. Applications for Dare to be Digital are assessed by members of Dare to be Digital's "Developer Accord", consisting entirely of representatives from the games industry. These representatives will also interview the teams before making a decision on which teams will take part that year.

These criteria are also used to decide the three winning teams, who go through to be nominated for the BAFTA Ones To Watch Award in association with Dare to Be Digital (or simply the BAFTA Ones to Watch) award. Additional awards are given by sponsors, such as Channel 4, Design in Action and Intel, as well as an audience and team choice awards based on public and team votes respectively.

== BAFTA Ones To Watch Award ==
The three winning teams of Dare to be Digital form the sole nominees of a BAFTA Ones To Watch Award as of 2007.

BAFTA Ones to Watch Previous Winners
Year	Team name	Game Name	Sponsoring University/College
2007	Voodoo Boogy	Ragnarawk	Abertay University
2009	DarkMatter Designs	Boro Toro	University of Wolverhampton
2010	The Butterflyers	Shrunk!	Abertay University
2011	That Game Studio	Twang!	University of Skövde
2012	Swallowtail	Tick Tock Toys	Norwich University College of the Arts and Abertay University
2013	Kind of a Big Deal	Starcrossed	Kajaani University of Applied Sciences and Abertay University
2014	DOS Studios	Size DOES Matter	Norwegian School of Information Technology
2015	Overly Kinetic (Team OK)	Chambara	University of Southern California and University of Colorado
2016	Mild Beast Games	Sundown	University of Southern California and Berklee College of Music
2017	Bluedoor Games	Among the Stones	Abertay University

There was no BAFTA Video Games Awards Ceremony in 2008. According to the BAFTA award database, the BAFTA Ones to Watch Award was no longer awarded after 2017.

== Dare ProtoPlay ==
Building on the final phase of Dare to be Digital, Dare ProtoPlay, a video game and consumer event, takes place over 3 days in August every year. After the competition ends the teams demonstrate their titles at Dare ProtoPlay, formerly held at the Edinburgh Interactive Festival until 2010 but now at the Caird Hall in Dundee. This free event is open to the general public.

13,000 visitors visited Dare ProtoPlay 2013. Dare 2014 was held on 7–10 August in Dundee City Square and Caird Hall.

== History ==
In 1999, an idea was developed within the University of Abertay Dundee, who were one of the global pioneers in academic courses for video games development. In 2000, it was opened to all university students across Scotland.

Different development models were tested with involvement from international teams who came from Japan, Canada, China, India and Malaysia, where a trial host centre model was carried out.

With industry and government support, the contest opened parallel host centres across the UK as of 2007, in Belfast and Electronic Arts office in Guildford. It has since been opened up to all UK and Irish universities and selected international partners, with all teams now being hosted in the University of Abertay Dundee.

== Awards and recognitions ==
Year	Award	Program	Awards Presenter
2008	New Talent Award	Develop Edu.	Develop Awards
2011	Recommendation for Universities, Colleges and Vocational education	Next Gen	NESTA
2014	Talent Investment	Develop Awards 2014	MCV/Develop

== Support ==
Scottish Enterprise Tayside and Dundee City Council have been supporters of the development of the competition since its beginning, along with local technology company NCR Corporation and game developers such as Rare, Blitz Games Studios, Electronic Arts and Rockstar North.

== Dare 2007 ==
12 teams took part in Dare 2007, including BAFTA Ones to Watch Award nominees Care Box for their game 'Climbactic' (Edinburgh University), Phoenix Seed for 'Bear Go Home' (Peking University and the University of Abertay Dundee) and Voodoo Boogy for 'Ragnarawk' who ultimately won the BAFTA Ones to Watch Award.

== Dare 2008 ==
There were 17 teams taking part in Dare 2008, including BAFTA Ones to Watch Award nominees Blue Skies for their game ‘Origamee’ (Abertay University), Ctrl_D for ‘VegeMe’(Peking University) and DarkMatter Designs for ‘Boro-Toro’, with the latter team winning. That year, Contrived Studios won the Audience Award sponsored by Microsoft.

== Dare 2009 ==
14 teams took part in 2009. The competition went more international with students coming from Canada, England, India, China, Northern Ireland, The Irish Republic, Norway, Scotland and Wales. The BAFTA Ones to Watch Award nominees were Colour-coded by PixelPirates (University of Abertay Dundee), Quick as Thieves by Gentlemen of Fortune (University of Abertay Dundee) and Shrunk by The Butterflyers (University of Abertay Dundee) who won the award.

== Dare 2010 ==
15 teams took part in 2010, coming from China, England, India, Ireland, Sweden, Scotland, USA and Wales. The three BAFTA Ones to Watch Award nominees were Angry Mango for their game 'Mush' (University of Wales, Newport), Team Tickle for 'Sculpty' (Abertay University) and That Game Studio for 'Twang', who ultimately won the award.

=== Awards ===
Prize winners were 'Bears with Jetpacks' for their game 'Grrr!' who won the "Adult Swim" sponsored award for innovation and creativity.

The Teams-Choice award went to Bazooka Duck, who also won the Intel Visual Adrenaline Award, and That Games Studio won the public choice award.

=== Media coverage ===
Dare 2010 was the focus of a 3 part documentary series filmed for, and screened by Channel 4 in the UK. Named 'Crunchtime' the series featured several teams during the development of their games and the Protoplay exhibition.

Team	Game	Format	Country
Abnormal Creations	The Inkwell Chronicles	Wii	UK
Angry Mango	Mush	Windows Mobile	Wales
Bazooka Duck	Epoch Defence	PC	UK
Bears with Jetpacks	Grrr!	Wii	UK
Creative Genius	Silent Symphony	PC	UK
eleMENTAL	Weatherman	Xbox 360	Scotland
Gazhab	Chayya	Xbox 360	India
Grimnir Games	Death Inc.	PSP	UK
King of Dice	Dice Rolling	PC	China
Nevermind Games	WiiKick	Wii	Ireland
Ramblin' Wreckage	Hella Umbrella	Android	USA
Shark on a Bike	Dyed World	Xbox 360	Scotland
Team Tickle	Sculpty	iPad	Scotland
That Games Studio	Twang	Xbox 360	Sweden
Various Artists	Legendary Crusaders	PC	UK

== Dare 2011 ==
Dare 2011 had 15 participating teams from England, Scotland, Wales, Ireland, Northern Ireland, India, Denmark and China.

Team	Game	Format	Country
A Necessary Evil	Carne Carne	PC	UK
Ape-y Eyes	Paper Quest	Kinect	UK
Crispy Nugget Studios	Galaxy Guardians	Kinect	UK
Digital Hazards	Shadow Light	PC	UK
Digital Knights	Joust it Out!	Kinect	Denmark
Evolved Ape	Dreamweaver	PC	UK
Faraway Games	Aida	iPad	UK
Fatdog Games	The Tale of Yog	iPad	UK
FunBox	Ants the Lost Memories	PC	India
Furnace Games	Scorcher	Kinect	UK
Rebel Donut	Plunder in the Jungle	Windows Phone 7	UK
Swallowtail	Tick Tock Toys	iPad	UK
Tea and Techno	Full English Fusion	Windows Phone 7	UK
The Weather Factory	The Balloonist	iPad	Ireland
Yummy Tummy	Who is the Lucky Ghost?	iPhone	China

== Dare 2012 ==
Dare 2012 had 15 participating teams from England, Scotland, Ireland, India, Finland, Israel, Spain and China.

Team	Game	Format	Country
Caracol Games	Slick!	PC	UK
CLOCKinROCK	Liminal Magibrawl	Kinect	Ireland
Fortified	Castle Crusade	iPad	UK
Dapper Hat Games	Mr. Montgomery's Debonair Facial Hair	iPad	UK
Gastank Games	Interstate Outlaws	Kinect	UK
Ideer	Colour Captain	iPad	China
Kind of a Big deal	Starcrossed	Windows Phone 7	Finland
LazzyBrains	What A Day: The Story of a fisher-worm	iPad	India
Loan Wolf Games	Pixel Story	PC	UK
Mad Rocket Games	Ready, Steady, Roll!	Android Tablet	UK
Must Make Games	Badgers vs. Turtles	iPad/iPhone	UK
Raptor Games	Project Thanatos	PC/Sensics zSight Headset	UK
Team Faceplant	GravTech	PC	UK
Team-Iso	IsoChronous	PC	Spain
The Nuclear Duck	Marcelo	Kinect	Israel

=== Awards 2012 ===
==== BAFTA "Ones to Watch Award" Nominations ====
- Starcrossed, for Windows Phone 7 by Kind of a Big Deal

- Pixel Story, for PC by Loan Wolf Games

- Project Thanatos, for PC and virtual reality headset by Raptor Games

==== Channel 4 prize ====
Loan Wolf Games

==== Intel Visual Computing Tools Audience Award ====
Raptor Games

==== Developers Choice Award ====
Team-Iso

== Dare 2014 ==
Dare 2014 had 15 participating teams from Scotland, England, Ireland, USA, China, India and Malta.

Team	Game	Format	Country
A Fox Wot I Drew	Baum	Android Tablet	UK & Ireland
AM	Sunny Rainy Snowy	iPad	China
Desk Jockeys	Reshuffle	Tablet	UK & Malta
Five Pixels	Seek	Android Tablet	UK
Good Day Games	Lapin	iPad	UK & Ireland
Insert Imagination	Kuria	PlayStation Vita	UK
Overly Kinetic	Chambara	PC	USA
Straight Ahead	Straight Ahead	iPad	China
Taleforge Studios	World Eater	iPad	UK
TCN	Soul Seeker	Android Tablet	UK
Team Pugstar	Pug Pug Pirates	iPad	UK & Ireland
The Pillowettes	D-Bug	iPad	USA
Too Mainstream	Sagittarius	PC & Oculus Rift	India
Torque	Don't Walk: RUN	PC/Tablet	UK
Unorthobox	Ally	PC with Controllers	UK

=== Awards 2014 ===
==== BAFTA "Ones to Watch Award" Nominations ====
- Chambara, for PC by Overly Kinetic

- Don't Walk: RUN, for PC and Tablet by Torque

- Sagittarius, for PC and Oculus Rift by Too Mainstream

==== Channel 4 prize ====
Don't Walk: RUN by Torque

==== The Foundry Artistic Achievement Award ====
Seek by Five Pixels

==== Dare Team's Choice Award ====
D-Bug by The Pillowettes

==== Dare Protoplay Audience Award ====
World Eater by Taleforge

==== Dare Commercial Potential Award ====
Baum by A Fox Wot I Drew

== Dare 2015 ==
Dare 2015 had 16 participating teams from Scotland, England, USA, Wales, Netherlands and Ireland.

Team	Game	Country
7th Beat Games	A Dance of Fire and Ice	UK & US
8 Bit Guardians	Acquisition	UK
Future Pixels	Squish Fits	Scotland
Green Bean Conspiracy	Steal Everything	England
Hello Sausage	Deep Space Mine	England
Intimate Systems	You and the Garden	USA
Mandlebar	Impulse Revolution	Northern Ireland & the Republic of Ireland
Mild Beast Games	Sundown	USA
Pathos Studios	Pathos	England & Wales
Pictrail	Selfienation	Scotland
Pixel Tailors	The Wall Shall Stand	UK
Polyhedron	Code Monkeys	Scotland
Prullaria	SnowDown	Netherlands
Sandy	Pogo Mad	Finland
Sun Bear	From The Verge To The Void	Ireland
Yeah Yeah Games	EctoPlaza	USA

=== Awards 2015 ===
==== BAFTA "Ones to Watch Award" Nominations ====
- The Wall Shall Stand by Pixel Tailors

- Sundown by Mild Beast Games

- Selfienation by Pictrail
