= Paragon 5 =

American-Polish video game developer

Paragon Five, Inc.
- Type: Private
- Industry: Video game industry
- Founded: 1999
- Founder: Paul Bragiel
- Defunct: 2004
- Headquarters: Chicago, Illinois, US; Wrocław, Poland, United States / Poland
- Key people: Paul Bragiel (founder & CEO), Pawel Kopinski (studio director, Poland), Stéphane Hockenhull (developer)
- Products: Video games

Paragon Five, Inc. (also known as Paragon 5) was a video game development company with offices in Chicago, Illinois and Wrocław, Poland. Founded in 1999 by Paul Bragiel, the studio is notable for developing some of the earliest console games to come out of Poland and for its collaboration with Japanese publisher Capcom on Nintendo hardware — the first such partnership between a Polish game studio and a major Japanese publisher. The company closed in 2004.

== History ==
=== Founding ===
Paragon Five was founded in 1999 by Paul Bragiel, an entrepreneur and game developer from Chicago, Illinois, who had spent the mid-1990s deeply involved in the demoscene — the underground community of coders, artists and musicians who competed to produce technically impressive work within the tight constraints of consumer hardware. Bragiel established the company with the explicit goal of creating high-quality games for next-generation console platforms, setting up two bases of operation: a Chicago office and a development studio in Wrocław, Poland.

The Polish studio was assembled through Bragiel's demoscene connections. Pawel Kopinski, who served as studio director of the Wrocław office, later recalled that he and several colleagues from the demoscene came together specifically under Bragiel's banner to build games for Nintendo hardware. Bragiel himself has described Paragon Five as one of his most formative professional ventures and the realisation of a lifelong dream to make games.

=== Games and output ===
Paragon Five's first release was Project S-11, a shoot 'em up developed for Sunsoft and released for the Game Boy Color in January 2001. Their second Game Boy Color title, Trouballs, followed later that year, published by Capcom — marking the first collaboration between a Polish game studio and a major Japanese publisher on a Nintendo platform. The studio subsequently moved to the Game Boy Advance, developing Hardcore Pinball in 2002, Karnaaj Rally in 2002 alongside Polish studio Infinite Dreams, and Micro Machines in 2003.

=== Closure ===
Paragon Five closed in 2004. Following the studio's closure, Bragiel went on to co-found Meetro, described as the first location-based social network, before becoming a prominent technology investor, founding several venture funds including i/o Ventures, Golden Gate Ventures, and Sisu Game Ventures.

== Technology ==
=== Paragon 5 GameBoy Tracker ===
One of the studio's most enduring contributions to the games industry was the Paragon 5 GameBoy Tracker, also known as "Beyond Tracker", a custom chiptune music composition tool developed by Paragon Five employee Stéphane Hockenhull specifically for the Game Boy Color hardware. The tracker was adopted by composers beyond Paragon Five's own productions — most notably Jake Kaufman, who used it to score Shantae for WayForward, with Bragiel serving as music producer on that project.

=== GBASS Sound Driver ===
Hockenhull also developed the GBASS Sound Driver, a modified version of Paragon Five's Game Boy Color sound driver. This driver was licensed to a range of other developers active in the GBC and Game Boy Advance scene, including Eurocom, WayForward, The Code Monkeys, One Man Band, Yoyo Entertainment, Rival Dreams and Matahari Studios.

== Games developed ==
Title	Year	Platform	Publisher
Project S-11	2001	Game Boy Color	Sunsoft
Trouballs	2001	Game Boy Color	Capcom
Hardcore Pinball	2002	Game Boy Advance	Telegames
Karnaaj Rally	2002	Game Boy Advance	Jaleco
Micro Machines	2003	Game Boy Advance	Infogrames
