= Shovel Knight: King of Cards =

2019 video game expansion

- Developer: Yacht Club Games
- Publisher: Yacht Club Games
- Composer: Jake Kaufman
- Platforms: Windows; macOS; Linux; PlayStation 3; PlayStation 4; PlayStation Vita; Nintendo 3DS; Nintendo Switch; Xbox One; Wii U; Amazon Fire TV
- Release: December 10, 2019; Nintendo 3DS; December 13, 2019
- Genre: Platform
- Mode: Single-player

Shovel Knight: King of Cards is a 2019 expansion for the 2014 platform game Shovel Knight. It was developed and published by Yacht Club Games. The player controls a dandy named King Knight as he goes on a quest to win a card game and be awarded the title "King of Cards". King Knight attacks enemies by charging towards them and is flung into the air after making contact with a surface or enemy. Gameplay is similar to the original Shovel Knight, and features a new world map. Compared to the original, there are more levels, but each one is shorter. Aside from the platforming, the player can optionally engage in a card minigame called Joustus. In Joustus, players must strategically place cards on a board to ensure they occupy certain spaces.

Yacht Club Games intended for King of Cards to be the final planned expansion for Shovel Knight, and desired for it to be the most ambitious. After removing the world map in the previous content pack Specter of Torment, Yacht Club Games hoped to make a new expansion featuring secret levels and stages with a shorter layout. The developers wanted to create an experience separate from the franchise's typical platforming gameplay, leading them to develop the Joustus minigame. The expansion was released alongside the multiplayer fighting game Shovel Knight Showdown. Upon release, King of Cards received generally favorable reviews from critics, who praised the level design and King Knight's characterization, while the Joustus minigame had a mixed response.

== Gameplay ==
King Knight uses his charge attack while midair against a flying enemy.

Like Shovel Knight, King of Cards is a 2D side-scrolling platform game. The player controls King Knight, a dandy on a quest to win a card game called Joustus and be appointed the "King of Cards". King Knight features a different moveset than other Shovel Knight protagonists; he attacks enemies by charging into them, and is flung upwards after making contact with a surface or enemy. After he is flung upwards, he spins in a pirouette, and can bounce upon enemies and objects while spinning.

King Knight has access to magical items called Heirlooms, such as a sword used to attack enemies or jump higher, a cloak that deflects attacks, and a bubble that allows him to float above the ground. Heirlooms are purchased using Merit Medals, collectables earned by exploring levels and defeating enemies in the Joustus card minigame. Compared to other Shovel Knight titles, there are more levels in King of Cards, but they are shorter, and include paths to hidden stages. They are placed around a world map that has several routes to progress. Members of the Order of No Quarter, the antagonist organization of the original Shovel Knight, wander the world map, and can be defeated in optional boss battles to earn rewards.

In addition to the platforming gameplay, the player can optionally engage in a card minigame called Joustus at pubs located around the world map. In Joustus, the player places cards onto spaces on a board, each card having pointed arrows on some of its sides. A placed card can use its arrows to move another card in a certain direction, such as up, down, left, or right. The arrows can further be used to block the opponent from moving a card in a direction. The intent of the game is to have the player's cards pushed onto spaces marked by gems, while preventing the opponent from having their cards occupy the gem spaces.

== Plot ==
The story is set before Shovel Knight, and, per Yacht Club Games' official timeline, before Specter of Torment. A card game called Joustus becomes popular across the world, with a tournament offering the title of "King of Cards" to whoever can defeat the three Joustus Judges. King Knight, a pretender seeking the title of king, receives a deck of cards from Specter Knight and begins to work his way through the tournament. King Knight's victories attract the attention of a bard and an airship captain named Cooper, who both seek a Joustus champion. With Cooper's airship, King Knight travels to Pridemoor Keep to face the first judge, King Pridemoor, gaining supporters along the way. However, due to the rules simply saying that the Joustus judges had to be defeated, King Knight defeats him in combat instead of using cards. Pridemoor offers to help King Knight defeat the remaining judges, and boards Cooper's airship.

As King Knight searches for the next judge, his mother begins showing romantic interest in King Pridemoor, disgusting King Knight. He fights and defeats the second judge, the Troupple King, before continuing on towards the last. On the outskirts of the final judge's lair, King Knight witnesses a conversation between Specter Knight and two hooded figures. King Knight battles and defeats the last judge, King Birder, who is revealed to be one of the hooded figures. The other figure appears, identifying herself as an evil spellcaster called the Enchantress; she tells King Knight of her plan to assemble an army of knights called the Order of No Quarter to help her dominate the world. King Knight, Pridemoor, and their allies pursue the Enchantress to the Tower of Fate, where King Knight defeats her in combat. The Enchantress sways King Knight by offering to appoint him as king in Pridemoor's place, and he turns on his allies to join the Order of No Quarter. King Knight ends the Joustus contest and usurps Pridemoor's throne, with his mother and King Pridemoor abandoning him. In a post-credits scene, King Knight finishes renovating Pridemoor Keep, and remarks to himself that he is finally able to enjoy his kingdom. Shovel Knight enters moments later, and both prepare for combat.

== Development and release ==
As part of the crowdfunding campaign for Shovel Knight on Kickstarter in 2013, Yacht Club Games listed several stretch goals, additional game features added when funding met a certain target. Among the stretch goals were the addition of three playable characters based around the bosses from the original game. The developers held a vote on which bosses would become playable, and King Knight was one of the winning characters. Yacht Club Games later decided to increase the scale of their plans and give each of the playable knights their own game.

King of Cards was the final planned expansion to Shovel Knight alongside the fighting game Shovel Knight Showdown, and was intended to be the most ambitious campaign. After removing the world map in Specter of Torment, Yacht Club Games hoped to make a larger game that featured secret levels and stages with a smaller layout. The new world map was influenced by Super Mario World and has the main progression routes marked by green paths, while hidden levels are marked by red paths. This was derived from Mario's use of the color to indicate secret areas. To help players find routes to the hidden levels, Yacht Club Games used red objects to lead to secret exits. Each secret exit is placed in the middle of the stage, which was done to avoid compelling players from replaying the entire level to find both the conventional and hidden routes.

The team reduced the size of the levels to distinguish King of Cards from the previous Shovel Knight games, and halved the player's available health. This was because the health system of the previous entries was designed to work with long levels. Wanting to avoid decreasing the difficulty of bosses to account for the lower health, Yacht Club Games allowed for stronger enemies to drop health power ups for every three hits they received. The developers were inspired by Wario when designing King Knight, and intended the character to act "like a big guy who throws his weight around." King Knight's mobility was altered several times, and the final design was compared by the developers to Plague Knight's from Shovel Knight: Plague of Shadows. The designers described him as an "over the top and decadent dandy" and decided to focus gameplay around expanding King Knight's holdings by gathering treasure and supporters.

Yacht Club Games decided to add Joustus to fit their intention that King of Cards would be bizarre and comedic, and they wanted to make a new experience beyond the franchise's platforming gameplay. They teased its inclusion in Specter of Torment, and drew inspiration from Triple Triad from Final Fantasy VIII, the board game Hive, and trading-card games like Magic: The Gathering and Pokémon. Joustus was introduced as an optional feature to avoid detracting from the platforming, and it was largely developed separately from that gameplay. The early versions of Joustus were called Cardurr, and the 3x3 board was inspired by Triple Triad. Special abilities and mechanics for the cards were envisioned inside a spreadsheet shared between team members. Yacht Club Games paid specific attention to the complexity of the abilities and created several mechanics such as "Bomb Arrows", which could be used to remove cards from the board, and "Cascade Arrows", which could convert an opponent's card to the player's side. The developers added ways for the player to cheat at Joustus to align with King Knight's characterization. Game menus were added to help players know their placement options and assemble the cards they wanted to play, and UI features were constructed to help show their abilities.

After creating the mechanics and abilities for Joustus, the developers planned the total number of cards. The final roster of cards features the likenesses of most characters in the Shovel Knight franchise. The team spent a significant amount of time brainstorming how the player would obtain new cards in-game, at one point designing a collectable item called "Card Juice" that could transform platforming enemies into cards. The ability to steal cards from defeated opponents was inspired by collectable card games, and required the creation of a different deck for every hostile character. Opponents that beat the player could even take cards from their deck. To balance the card-playing AI that the player would face, the developers constructed the programming to make decisions intending to prolong each game, while allowing it to change its behaviors to fit the player's skill. Joustus was originally intended to be played at villages located around the world map, though these locations were replaced by smaller pubs called Card Houses. The soundtrack of King of Cards was composed by Jake Kaufman, who did the same for the original Shovel Knight.

The game was planned to release on April 9, 2019, but was delayed, and was launched for Windows, macOS, Linux, PlayStation 3, PlayStation 4, PlayStation Vita, Wii U, Xbox One, Nintendo Switch, and Amazon Fire TV on December 10, 2019. It was released concurrently with Showdown, and both can be purchased as individual games or as part of the Shovel Knight: Treasure Trove collection. A version for Nintendo 3DS was released on December 13.

== Reception ==
Reception

Aggregate scores
| Aggregator | Score |
|---|---|
| Metacritic | PC: 84/100; Switch: 83/100 |
| OpenCritic | 93% |

Review scores
| Publication | Score |
|---|---|
| Destructoid | 10/10 |
| Easy Allies | 9.0/10 |
| Edge | 8/10 |
| GameRevolution | 8/10 |
| GameSpot | 8/10 |
| IGN | 8.5/10 |
| Nintendo Life | 9/10 |
| Nintendo World Report | 7.5/10 |
| Shacknews | 9/10 |
| USgamer | 3.5/5 |

According to the review aggregator website Metacritic, King of Cards received "generally favorable reviews". Some critics felt that the game was a worthy final expansion to Shovel Knight. Nintendo Life said that the game was of similar quality to its predecessors, while Shacknews felt that King of Cards was the most sprawling expansion in the entire franchise. Despite finding the game inferior to Plague of Shadows and Specter of Torment, USgamer said that King of Cards was still a competent game within the series. The Sydney Morning Herald said that it demonstrated the increased capabilities of Yacht Club Games, calling it a "challenging, funny, beautiful game".

Reviewers highlighted the shorter levels. Nintendo World Report found the levels unique in how they deviated from the franchise's typical structure while remaining challenging, and liked how they could be finished more quickly. Nintendo Life compared them to Nintendo platforming levels and felt they brought more mechanical diversity. IGN considered the levels well-balanced, saying they were difficult but not frustrating to play. Other critics found some of the levels and designs too familiar. Destructoid said that the campaign was hurt by the inclusion of settings from previous games, an opinion that Easy Allies also held. GameSpot found the inclusion of the previous settings nostalgic, but said the some of the bosses became less impactful due to reuse. HobbyConsolas wrote that King of Cards was less appealing because it relied upon the design conventions of the original Shovel Knight. Several critics highlighted the difficulty of the later levels. The Sydney Morning Herald considered the late game fairly balanced, unlike other retro games, while Shacknews said that the final boss was too difficult and replicated the unbalanced mechanics of the 8-bit era.

Reviewers discussed King Knight's moveset. GameRevolution described his gameplay style as "brash and cocky", while GameSpot found it distinct, saying that it paired well with the platforming and increased the speed of combat. Shacknews said that his abilities were more standout compared to the powers in previous Shovel Knight games. Nintendo World Report said that the movement was fun but called it too difficult to fully master. His characterization and writing was praised. Shacknews equated the character to "a bad Renaissance fair actor who's gotten too far into his role," and felt that this characterization helped make him interesting to play. GameSpot and The Sydney Morning Herald both found the writing humorous and King Knight entertaining. GameRevolution enjoyed the story, writing that Yacht Club Games had unintentionally created a narrative relevant to modern times through its depiction of an evil and incompetent character rising to power through chance. While finding King Knight less appealing than previous series protagonists, IGN liked the character's story and compared him to Jerry Lawler.

The Joustus minigame received a mixed response. Nintendo Life and IGN felt that Joustus was more than a simple minigame, calling it complex and easy to learn. Shacknews considered it a bold and interesting inclusion, and made King of Cards stand out from its platforming-focused predecessors. On the other hand, GameRevolution criticized the Joustus opponents as too easy, and said that the game relied on randomness over skill. USgamer wrote that it was hard to create strategies despite the simple ruleset, and Nintendo World Report found Joustus difficult because of the number of abilities incorporated in the gameplay. Some critics felt that it disrupted the platforming. IGN said that Joustus interrupted the overall pacing of King of Cards, and that it became difficult to unlock Merit Medals without playing the minigame. The Sydney Morning Herald concurred, writing that players may disapprove of how platforming progression was tied to performing well in Joustus. GameSpot found the minigame challenging, stating that it offered a good way for players to take a break from the platforming.
