= Cyber Shadow =

2021 video game

- Developer: Mechanical Head Studios
- Publisher: Yacht Club Games
- Director: Aarne Hunziker
- Designer: Aarne Hunziker
- Composer: Enrique Martin
- Engine: Construct
- Platforms: Windows; Linux; macOS; Switch; PlayStation 4; PlayStation 5; Xbox One
- Release: January 26, 2021
- Genres: Action, platform
- Mode: Single-player

Cyber Shadow is a side-scrolling action-platform game developed by Finnish indie studio Mechanical Head Studios and published by Yacht Club Games. Using an 8-bit aesthetic, the game follows a cybernetic ninja named Shadow who sets out to rescue his clan in a world overrun by machines.

The game is mostly developed by Aarne Hunziker, who is the sole member of Mechanical Head Studios. It was first shown at PAX East 2019, having been in development from years before and silently announced before that event. It contains stated inspirations from other platform video games such as Ninja Gaiden. The game was released on January 26, 2021 to mostly positive reviews, citing the graphics and gameplay as highlights.

== Gameplay ==
Cyber Shadow is a side-scrolling action-platformer in which players control a ninja character who battles enemies with a sword and various special abilities acquired as subweapons. It features an 8-bit aesthetic which shares similarities to Shatterhand and contains several gameplay elements of Shadow of the Ninja, Ninja Gaiden, Mega Man, Castlevania and similar games, which include snaking paths and occasional backtracking. Several bosses are present.

The game's story is told primarily through cinematic cutscenes, though in-engine ones are used as well.

== Plot ==
The game's plot follows Shadow, a cyborg ninja who sets out to free his fallen clan from synthetic lifeforms harvesting them for their powers. It is set in the ruins of the fictional Mekacity. Shadow travels across Mekacity, fighting the cybernetic beings as well as a traitor from his ninja clan called Apparitor, and ends his captured clanmates lives to free their spirits. His ultimate goal is to find the Master of the clan, with whom the original human Shadow had a seemingly romantic relationship. Shadow discovers that the Master was dying of a mysterious spiritual disease, and her father, in a mad scheme to save her life, attacked the city with his synthetic army and betrayed the Clan so as to drain their mystical powers, and use the drained energy to keep his daughter alive. Cyber-Shadow sets out to defeat him so that he can free her spirit from her dying body and reunite with her in the Ethos, the spiritual realm.

== Development ==
Cyber Shadow was developed by Mechanical Head Studios, a team consisting purely of the creator Aarne Hunziker, and published by Yacht Club Games. Aarne Hunziker, having already been developing the game for years on his own, initially had no intention of teaming up with a publisher; he was first discovered by Yacht Club while posting about the ongoing development on Twitter, and later was convinced by them to "join [their] little family". Although most of the development is handled by Hunziker, the music will be composed by Enrique Martin and produced by Jake Kaufman; in addition to their usual role as a publisher, Yacht Club is giving design feedback from their previous experience developing Shovel Knight.

Hunziker's first experience in game development was hacking the ROMs of classic games to manipulate their visuals, effectively customizing them. He later decided to create his own game, but scrapped it. Four years later he began coding from scratch what would become Cyber Shadow. He has had continued difficulties with the development of the game due to its scope and having to do it almost entirely alone.

Hunziker has described the game as one that combines "the level design principles of Mario, the skills and action of Ninja Gaiden, the enemy designs of Contra and the dark visual aesthetic of Batman", but has also said that it is more deliberately intended as a callback to Shadow of the Ninja. In an interview with Siliconera, he said that "[t]he story is about exploiting carefully nurtured ancient knowledge with logic" as a reason why it involves both ancient ninjas and futuristic robots.

The game was first shown at PAX East 2019, though it was announced less publicly earlier.

In the "Yacht Club Games Presents" on February 26, 2020, it was revealed that the game would release in 2021, and that the Shovel Knight Amiibo would be compatible with the Nintendo Switch version of the game. It was released on January 26, 2021 for PlayStation 4, PlayStation 5, Xbox One, Nintendo Switch and Microsoft Windows.

== Reception ==
Reception

Aggregate scores
Aggregator	Score
Metacritic	PC: 81/100; PS4: 79/100; PS5: 77/100; NS: 81/100; XONE: 80/100
OpenCritic	84% recommend

Review scores
Publication	Score
Destructoid	7.5/10
Game Informer	7.5/10
GameSpot	7/10
Hardcore Gamer	4/5
IGN	8/10

All versions of Cyber Shadow have received "generally favorable reviews", according to review aggregator Metacritic. Fellow review aggregator OpenCritic assessed that the game received strong approval, being recommended by 84% of critics. IGN summed up their 8/10 review by saying "Cyber Shadow's excellent gameplay, level design, variety, and music make it a great modernization of the classic Ninja Gaiden formula."

According to Nintendo (which runs the Nintendo eShop), Cyber Shadow was one of the 15 best-selling indie games of 2021 on the Nintendo Switch.
