= Yacht Club Games =

American video game company

Yacht Club Games, LLC
- Type: Private
- Industry: Video games
- Founded: 2011; 15 years ago
- Headquarters: Los Angeles, California, U.S.
- Key people: Sean Velasco
- Number of employees: 19 (February 2022)
- Website: www.yachtclubgames.com

Yacht Club Games, LLC is an American independent video game development studio and publisher based in Los Angeles, California. It was founded in 2011 by former WayForward Technologies director Sean Velasco. The company announced its first title, Shovel Knight, on March 14, 2013, and released it on June 26, 2014, after a successful Kickstarter campaign. In 2016, the company announced that it would start publishing games from other companies and that the first published game would be Azure Striker Gunvolt: Striker Pack, a compilation containing Azure Striker Gunvolt and Azure Striker Gunvolt 2, which was released later that year. Their second published title was Cyber Shadow, a game developed by Mechanical Head Studios, released in 2021. In February 2022, the company announced its second original title, Mina the Hollower.

The studio has been facing financial issues ahead of the release of Mina the Hollower, with Sean Velasco describing the release of the game as "make-or-break for sure".

== Games developed ==
Year	Title	Genre	Platform	Additional note(s)
2014	Shovel Knight	Platformer	Amazon Fire TV, Linux, macOS, Microsoft Windows, Nintendo 3DS, Nintendo Switch, PlayStation 3, PlayStation 4, PlayStation Vita, Wii U, Xbox One	Originally released simply as Shovel Knight but later renamed with subtitle Shovel of Hope Supported with expansion packs including Plague of Shadows (2015), Specter of Torment (2017), King of Cards (2019), and Showdown (2019)
2021	Shovel Knight Pocket Dungeon	Puzzle, roguelite	macOS, Microsoft Windows, Nintendo Switch, PlayStation 4	A spin-off entry in the Shovel Knight series. Co-developed with Vine.
2022	Shovel Knight Dig	Roguelite, platformer	Apple Arcade, Microsoft Windows, Nintendo Switch, PlayStation 5, Xbox Series X/S	A spin-off entry in the Shovel Knight series. Co-developed with Nitrome.
2026	Mina the Hollower	Action-adventure	Microsoft Windows, macOS, Linux, Nintendo Switch, Nintendo Switch 2, PlayStation 5, Xbox Series X/S	—N/a
TBA	Shovel Knight: Shovel of Hope DX	Platformer	Microsoft Windows, macOS, Linux, Nintendo Switch	An enhanced version of Shovel Knight: Shovel of Hope.
TBA	Untitled Shovel Knight game	Platformer	TBA	An upcoming mainline entry in the Shovel Knight series.

== Games published ==
Year	Title	Developer	Genre	Platform(s)	Additional note(s)
2016	Azure Striker Gunvolt: Striker Pack	Inti Creates	Action, platformer	Nintendo 3DS	Physical compilation of Azure Striker Gunvolt and Azure Striker Gunvolt 2
2021	Cyber Shadow	Mechanical Head Studios (Note: The game's development was mostly done by Aarne Hunziker, the only member of the studio, but the music was composed and produced by Enrique Martin and Jake Kaufman, respectively.)	Action, platformer	Linux, macOS, Microsoft Windows, Nintendo Switch, PlayStation 4, PlayStation 5, Xbox One	—N/a
