= Mina the Hollower =

2026 video game

- Developer: Yacht Club Games
- Publisher: Yacht Club Games
- Producer: Tina Carter
- Designer: Alec Faulkner
- Composers: Jake Kaufman; Yuzo Koshiro
- Platforms: Linux; macOS; Nintendo Switch; Nintendo Switch 2; PlayStation 5; Windows; Xbox Series X/S
- Release: May 29, 2026
- Genre: Action-adventure
- Mode: Single-player

Mina the Hollower is a 2026 action-adventure game developed and published by Yacht Club Games. It released on Linux, macOS, Nintendo Switch, Nintendo Switch 2, PlayStation 5, Windows, and Xbox Series X/S. Mina the Hollower is inspired by games developed for the Game Boy. It received critical acclaim and has sold more than 500,000 copies.

== Gameplay ==
The protagonist fighting an enemy with the whip

The player character is Mina, a genius inventor and mouse who has created advances in Spark Technology. She is a Hollower, a member of a guild dedicated to studying the Earth. She can pick between three different weapons in the beginning of the game. They include a whip (Nightstar), dual daggers (Whisper and Vesper), and a hammer (Blaststrike Maul) that allows her to attack in four directions. Mina can unlock two additional weapons later in the game, and hold one at a time.

Additionally, Mina can take advantage of a technique known as "Hollowing". This grants her the ability to burrow underground for a short time as a way to traverse short distances quickly and cross gaps, while being invincible.

Currency called "Bones" can be spent to raise Mina's combat statistics, and trinkets can be equipped to provide permanent boosts to her navigational and combative abilities. Sidearms can also be found throughout the world, providing Mina with a wide variety of support and combative roles; unlike Trinkets, however, Sidearms are lost upon death.

The game is in a 3/4 isometric perspective, similar to Game Boy Color games such as The Legend of Zelda: Link's Awakening DX.

== Plot ==
Mina the Hollower takes place on Tenebrous Isle, a landmass inhabited by humans and anthropomorphic animals that contains seven "Spark Generators" which power the island and its capital city of Ossex. Mina, a mouse and inventor who helped build the Spark Generators, is invited back to the island by the Marshal of Ossex, who tells her that conditions have worsened over her ten-year absence. Along the way, her ship is wrecked by a monster and she learns that Ossex is under attack by numerous turncoat soldiers. She meets with Baron Lionel, the island's ruler, who helped her build the Spark Generators years before. Lionel informs her that six of the seven generators have been damaged and shut down, requesting her assistance in reactivating them. Thorne, a bat acting as leader of the turncoat soldiers, attacks Mina after she leaves Lionel's manor but flees before he can be captured.

Mina travels across the island, encountering numerous hostile environments as she repairs and reactivates the generators. She encounters Thorne again and learns that he is the Marshal of Ossex; Thorne reveals that he chose to rebel after he discovered that the Spark Generators were worsening the island's environments, and he summoned her for assistance because Lionel was unwilling to shut down the machines. At the sixth generator, Mina secretly witnesses a conversation between Lionel and Thorne. The baron feigns a willingness to shut down the machines, but instead throws Thorne into the generator, and the toxins inside it transform him into a monster.

Mina returns to Ossex to have dinner with Lionel at his manor, which contains the seventh Spark Generator. The baron tricks his guests into believing that Mina is a criminal who seeks to destroy the generators, citing various actions the player committed across the game as evidence of her evil intentions. Mina fights her way through the manor, learning that the baron has always been aware of the effects of the Spark Generators, and that he designed the Plasmium Vials she uses to heal herself as a way to reverse or suppress the monstrous transformations.

Mina defeats Lionel in his office, and he reveals that he was the monster that attacked her ship. He uses toxins to assume this monstrous form, attacking her as she climbs the generator. Thorne joins the battle and helps Mina defeat Lionel, though he is critically wounded and falls off the generator to his apparent death. Mina kills Lionel and destroys the seventh Spark Generator, permanently shutting down the others in the process. Ossex is thrown into chaos due to the loss of the generators, and Mina flees Tenebrous Isle while pursued by a mob of Lionel's supporters. In a post-credits scene, Mina finds Thorne on a neighboring island, where she uses a Plasmium Vial to heal and restore him to his normal appearance. In an alternative ending, if the player avoids committing any actions that Lionel could use as evidence of Mina's evil intentions, she can reaffirm her loyalty to Lionel while at the dinner. The two continue to work together and eventually suppress Thorne's rebellion.

== Development ==
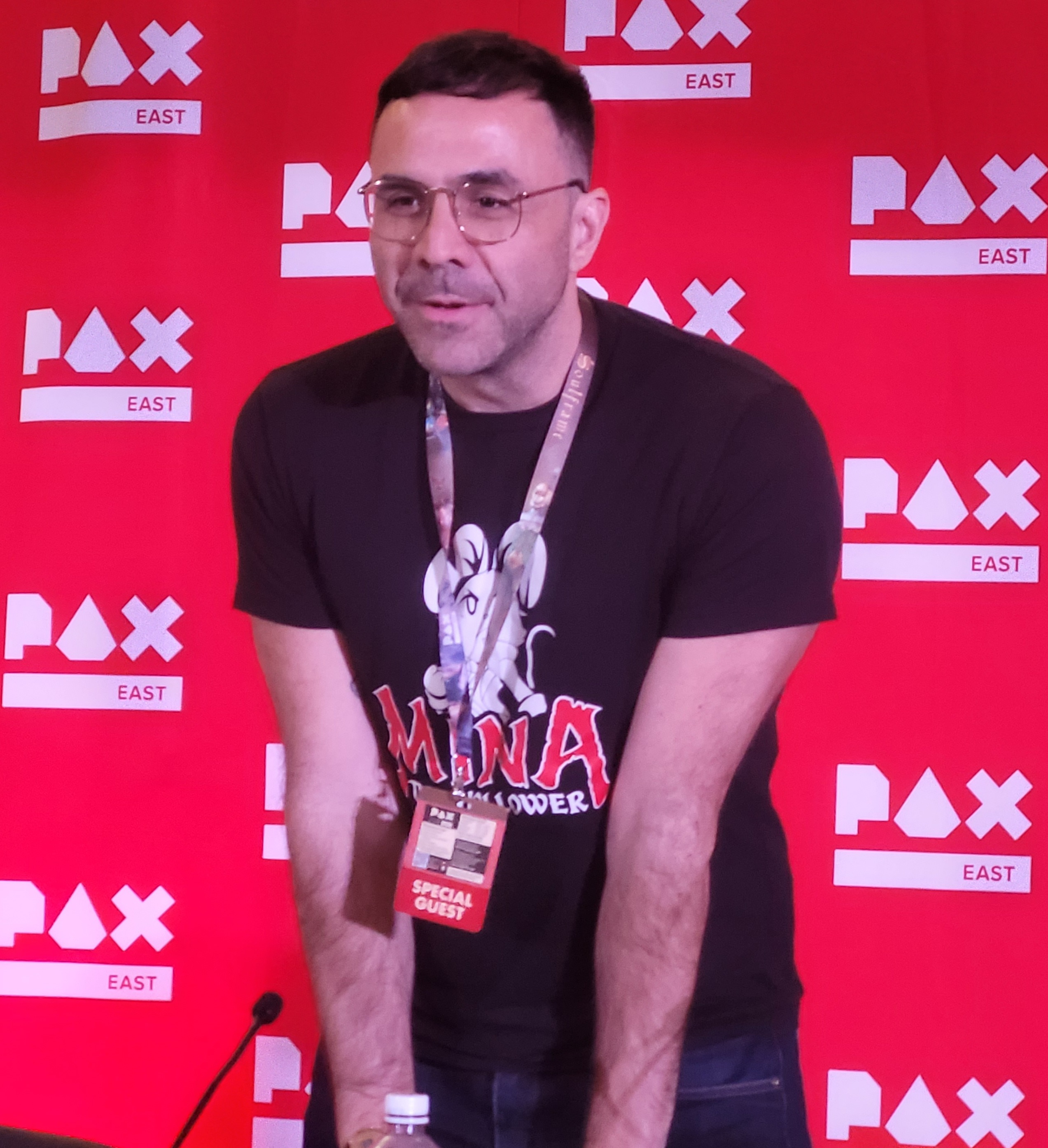
Mina the Hollower director Sean Velasco

Mina the Hollower originally began as a side project by Yacht Club Games employee Alec Faulkner to hone his coding and artistic capabilities, and was not originally intended for commercial release. Development on the solo affair, then under the name Gothic, caught the attention of Yacht Club management, who viewed the title as a favorable pairing to the studio's flagship Shovel Knight series. On February 2, 2022, a Kickstarter campaign was launched to support development, which raised USD$1,239,584 from 21,439 backers. When including other sources of crowdfunding, the game raised over USD$1,400,000 for the studio. Originally scheduled for release on October 31, 2025, the game was later delayed to May 29, 2026. On June 1, 2026, programmer David D'Angelo told GameSpot that failed play testing is what led to the game being delayed.

Mina the Hollower was designed to mimic the visual appearance of a Game Boy Color title. This stylistic decision was made while still a side project for Faulkner, inspired by a slew of Game Boy games he had been playing in his personal time. In an attempt to pay homage to early portable gaming and remain as authentic as possible to the original Game Boy hardware, Mina abides by the technical limitations of the Game Boy, containing no 3D assets and limiting pixel design to four colors per tile. Exceptions to this philosophy include the game's widescreen resolution and loose adherence to the pixel grid for sprites.

The developers' interest in scary stories and horror games, as well as creating the darker-in-tone Specter of Torment downloadable content for Shovel Knight, is what inspired them to create a darker game. The gameplay and story draws influences from such games as Castlevania, The Legend of Zelda: Link's Awakening, and Bloodborne. Other influences include the Disneyland rides The Haunted Mansion and Pirates of the Caribbean. The soundtrack was composed by Jake Kaufman, with two guest tracks from Yuzo Koshiro.

== Reception ==
Reception

Aggregate scores
Aggregator	Score
Metacritic	(NS2) 90/100 (PC) 90/100 (PS5) 91/100
OpenCritic	98% recommend (Note: Based on 109 reviews)

Review scores
Publication	Score
Edge	7/10
Eurogamer	10/10
Famitsu	8/10, 8/10, 8/10, 8/10
Game Informer	8.8/10
GameSpot	9/10
GamesRadar+	4.5/5
Giant Bomb	3.5/5
Hardcore Gamer	4.5/5
IGN	10/10
Nintendo Life	9/10
Nintendo World Report	9/10
RPGamer	4.5/5
Shacknews	10/10

=== Pre-release ===
Will Greenwald of PCMag called the game ambitious in a preview, comparing it to "Castlevania meets Zelda" and describing the presentation as "charming". Stating that he was "very impressed" with the game's demo, he called the mechanic of diving into the ground "unusual", but stated that he quickly got used to it as a natural part of gameplay. Thomas Whitehead of Nintendo Life stated that he was ultimately "left excited" by the game after playing the demo, calling it an "excellent return" for the studio after making numerous spin-offs. Alex Stadnik of Game Informer called it a "gorgeous homage".

=== Post-release ===
Mina the Hollower received "universal acclaim", according to the review aggregator website Metacritic. On review aggregator OpenCritic, 98% of critics recommended the game. The main praise comes from its gameplay, story, and presentation.

=== Sales ===
The game sold over 300,000 copies across all platforms in the first three days. Within two weeks of launching, the game had sold over 500,000 copies.

=== Awards ===
Year	Award	Category	Result	Ref.
2026	Golden Joystick Awards	Best Indie Game — Self-Published	Nominated	
2026	The Game Awards 2026	Best Independent Game	Pending	

== In other media ==
Mina is scheduled to appear as a playable character in the fighting game Rivals of Aether II in 2027. This is the second collaboration between Yacht Club Games and Aether Studios, following the addition of Shovel Knight to the original Rivals of Aether in 2018.
