= Shovel Knight Showdown =

2019 video game expansion

- Official artwork
- Developer: Yacht Club Games
- Publisher: Yacht Club Games
- Platforms: Windows; macOS; Linux; PlayStation 3; PlayStation 4; Nintendo Switch; Xbox One; Wii U; Amazon Fire TV
- Release: December 10, 2019
- Genre: Fighting
- Modes: Single-player, multiplayer

Shovel Knight Showdown is a 2019 fighting video game developed and published by Yacht Club Games. It is an expansion to the platform game Shovel Knight. Players battle using one fighter from among a roster of twenty characters, each with various movesets and fighting styles. The game features several modes, such as "Treasure Clash", where players battle one another to collect the most gems, to a free for all battle to the death. In the story mode, a single player battles against AI-controlled opponents across several stages before facing a boss. Completing this mode with each fighter allows the player to unlock new stages and characters.

Yacht Club Games envisioned Showdown as a small minigame similar to modes in Mega Man 7 (1995) and Super Mario Bros. 3 (1988). The developers gradually built a more expansive title which they compared to a party game. Showdown was released for Windows, macOS, Linux, PlayStation 3, PlayStation 4, Nintendo Switch, Xbox One, Wii U, and Amazon Fire TV on December 10. It was launched alongside the Shovel Knight expansion campaign King of Cards. The game received average reviews on release, with praise towards its characters and multiplayer gameplay. The single-player mode received a negative response, with many reviewers criticizing its difficulty balancing.

== Gameplay ==
Shovel Knight, Black Knight, Polar Knight, and Goldarmor fight on the Colosseum level. Battles can be fought with up to four players using various characters.

Shovel Knight Showdown is a platform fighting game. Players battle using one fighter from a roster of twenty different characters in the Shovel Knight franchise, all of which possess their own movesets and fighting styles. Each fighter has a basic and special attack, a movement skill, and the ability to parry. Playable characters range from Shovel Knight, who attacks with a shovel or magic wand, to Specter Knight, a fast character who can wall jump, to Plague Knight, who throws explosive bombs.

One to four players can engage in combat across several game modes. These settings include a free for all, where the victor is decided by whoever defeats all the other players, to a cooperative mode where players team up to battle AI-controlled opponents. One mode called "Treasure Clash" centers around collecting gems that appear around the level as quickly as possible, while claiming the jewels of other players by slaying them. During battle, various items appear intermittently across the level, and collecting them causes a helpful effect. For example, an item could be food that restores health, or a magnet that can be used to push back other players. Each stage can be altered using a set of modifiers that allow for different effects and battle scenarios, such as a modifier that prevents items from appearing, or another that causes bombs to fall randomly around the level. A special mode called "Chester's Choice" allows the player to randomly set these modifiers, leading to distinct battles with different combinations of stages, items, teams, and other features.

Showdown features a single-player story mode. Set after the narrative of Shovel Knight: Specter of Torment, the plot of the mode is about Specter Knight's friends attempting to defeat the Enchantress by imprisoning her in a magic mirror. In the process, they accidentally create hostile clones of each of the knights which the player must defeat. In this setting, players battle through stages and opponents that are unique to the chosen character, though each variation of the story mode ends with a two-phase boss battle against the mirror. A special minigame must be completed to progress through the campaign; it requires the player to break several moving targets to achieve a set score. Story mode features three difficulty options, and completing the mode for each character allows the player to unlock new fighters and levels.

== Development and release ==
As part of the crowdfunding campaign for Shovel Knight on Kickstarter, Yacht Club Games listed several stretch goals, additional features for the game added when the funding met a certain target. Among the stretch goals was the addition of a four-player battle mode, which would eventually become Shovel Knight Showdown. Showdown was Yacht Club Games' first attempt at creating a multiplayer experience. The developers originally intended for Showdown to be a minigame similar to game modes in Mega Man 7 (1995) and Super Mario Bros. 3 (1988), though the team gradually made it more ambitious. They described the finished product as similar to a party game, yet more expansive and complicated, comparing it to a Super Smash Bros. game.

The team wanted to create variety between battles, and decided to create Chester's Choice to complement the free for all and Treasure Clash settings. The developers created the mode after finding the modifiers too difficult to navigate through a menu. The team tried simplifying these menus and options, but found that they were still too numerous to manage. Chester's Choice was designed as a way for players to avoid spending significant time picking these modifiers. They took inspiration for the mode from Mario Party games, where the game automatically determines each of its settings. Yacht Club Games originally called the mode Roulette, but eventually renamed it after Chester, a character from the franchise who acts as a merchant. Shovel Knight Showdown was delayed from its planned release date of April 9, 2019 so that the developers could refine it. The game was launched concurrently with the expansion campaign Shovel Knight: King of Cards on December 10 for Windows, macOS, Linux, PlayStation 3, PlayStation 4, Wii U, Xbox One, Nintendo Switch, and Amazon Fire TV. It is available both as a standalone game and as part of the Shovel Knight: Treasure Trove compilation.

== Reception ==
Reception

Aggregate scores
Aggregator	Score
Metacritic	Switch: 75/100; PC: 65/100
OpenCritic	36% recommend

Review scores
Publication	Score
Game Informer	7.5/10
GameRevolution	6/10
Nintendo Life	8/10
Nintendo World Report	7/10
USgamer	4.5/5

According to the review aggregator website Metacritic, Showdown received "generally favorable reviews" for its Nintendo Switch version, and "mixed to average reviews" for its PC versions. The game has a 36% approval rating on OpenCritic. Some reviewers said that Showdown lacked an identity as an independent game. Nintendo World Report found it to be fun when played in short periods, but said that it became repetitive over time. GameRevolution called it overall inferior to the rest of the Shovel Knight franchise due to its reliance on multiplayer. In a more positive review, USgamer said that Showdown was one of the best party games of 2019.

Critics considered Showdown a competent multiplayer game. USgamer felt that it would appeal to those who had never encountered the franchise, and would draw in new players through its chaotic gameplay. Nintendo Life noted the speed of matches, and said that it was easy to set up and teach players its mechanics. GameRevolution said that the modes helped make the game feel chaotic and fun, while Vandal found the combat too intense and disorderly to be entertaining. Other reviewers criticized the online multiplayer support as too limited.

The playable characters were positively received. Nintendo Life considered their movesets unique, saying that the inclusion of boss characters from previous games was good fan service. Nintendo World Report called many of the characters well-designed and implemented. USgamer felt that the game distinguished itself from the indie fighting game TowerFall because of its character options. Game Informer found the characters easy to learn and fun but lacking in depth due to their simplicity. Other critics considered some characters unbalanced. Nintendo World Report said that smaller fighters would be at a disadvantage, while GameRevolution cited Shovel Knight as a weak fighter compared to the others. Vandal criticized the characters for their simplistic movesets and lack of depth and balance.

The story mode received a negative response. USgamer opined that the single-player gameplay was inferior to multiplayer by design, but said that its narrative would placate fans of the franchise. Many reviewers wrote that it had poor difficulty balance. Others felt that its AI-controlled opponents were too easy, and GameRevolution added that the minigames in the campaign were frustrating to complete. Game Informer found the story mode repetitive, saying that it would dissuade players from completing it to unlock new characters and stages. A few critics highlighted the boss battle, with GameRevolution writing that it was reminiscent of earlier Shovel Knight games and "delivers on everything you'd want from the series".
