= Aleksi Eeben =

Finnish composer and programmer (born 1976)

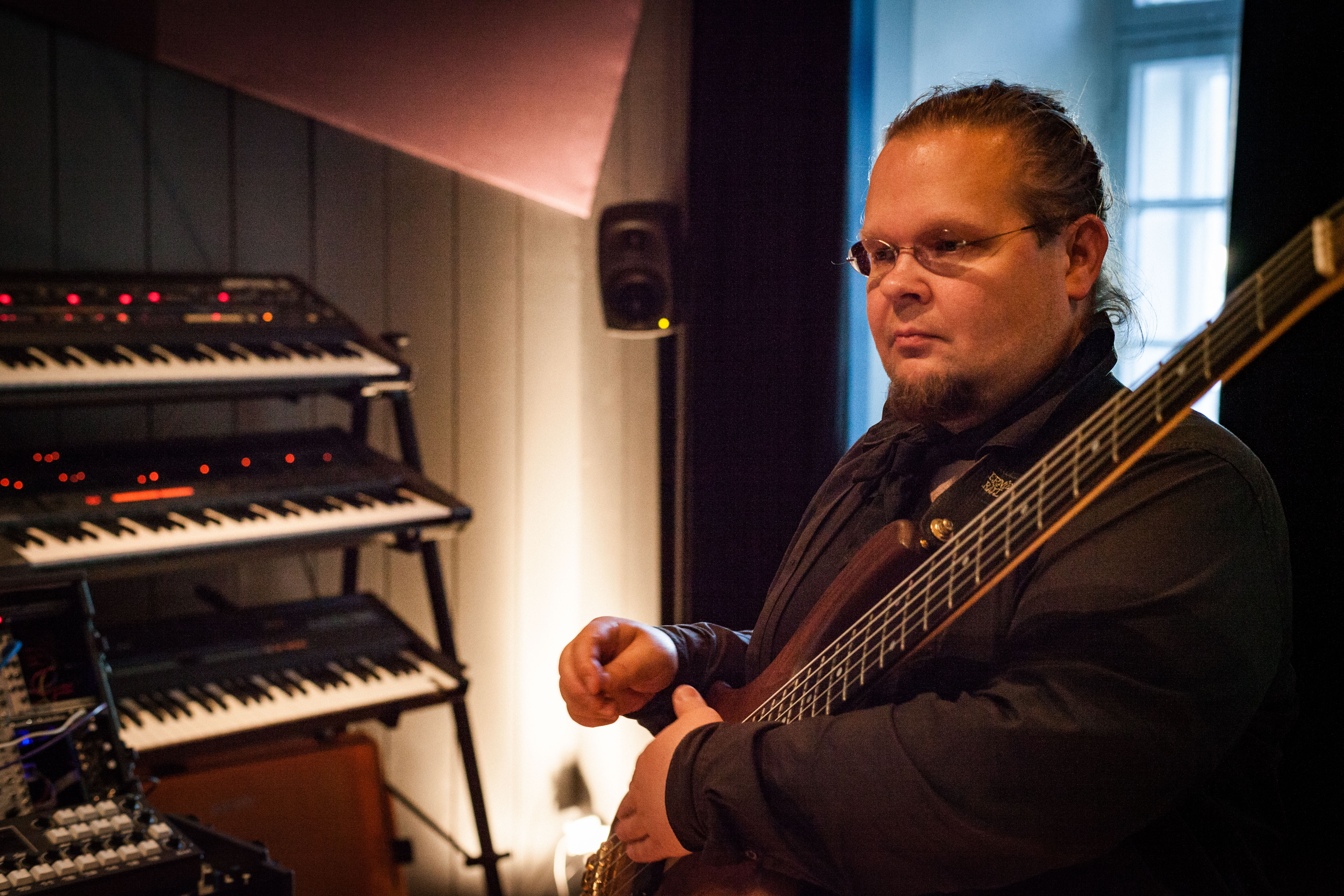
- Eeben in 2017

Background information
- Also known as: Heatbeat; Please Annihilate Oulu
- Born: Antti Aleksi Mikkonen; 2 July 1976 (age 49); Finland
- Genres: Chiptune; electronica; techno; ambient; classical; jazz; video game music
- Occupations: Composer; sound designer; musician; programmer
- Years active: 1988–present
- Labels: Monotonik; Kahvi
- Website: https://aleksieeben.wordpress.com/

Aleksi Eeben (born 2 July 1976), born Antti Aleksi Mikkonen, is a Finnish composer, sound designer, musician and programmer. He is best known for his musical contributions to the demoscene under the alias Heatbeat, where he has composed hundreds of modules using music tracker software and developed his own tools. He has also composed for video games, and was employed as a sound designer at Nokia (later Microsoft Mobile) between 2002 and 2015, creating many ringtones and sounds. His brother is Konsta Mikkonen, also a demoscene musician and dance producer known under the alias Muffler.

== Biography ==
=== Early life ===
Eeben has been interested in music and computers since he was a child, where he played with bongos and sung, and took basic tutorials from magazines. This led to him programming in BASIC on the VIC-20 and Commodore 64, as well as composing music.

=== Demoscene and games ===
Eeben joined the demoscene group Rebels in 1990, and later formed his own group Carillon, which merged with Cyberiad to form the group CNCD. He composed hundreds of tracks for demos and competitions, as well as the soundtrack for the Amiga game Elfmania. He later became inactive in the demoscene, although continued to compose music, while his younger brother continued being active composing music in the demoscene.

In 2001, he composed for the Game Boy Color game Project S-11, with fellow demoscene musician Jonne Valtonen. Paul Bragiel, the founder of Paragon 5 which developed this game, recruited both composers to write music using the company's own tracker, Game Boy Tracker. The music in this game has been considered by critics to be rather complex for the system. Additional titles he composed for include Tom and Jerry: Mouse Hunt and an unreleased game, as well as a track for the homebrew game Mean Mr. Mustard and the Game Boy Advance game Hardcore Pinball. He also developed a music tracker for the Game Boy Color titled Carillon Editor, as well as demos for the system.

During this period, he returned to composing music for the Commodore 64 and developed tracker software for the computer named John Player, feeling that other music tools for the system were unintuitive. He also developed Polly Tracker in 2004, a 4 channel MOD tracker for the Commodore 64 and Sid Vicious in 2006, a software emulator of the Commodore 64's SID chip for the VIC-20.

He has also returned to developing Game Boy software, including the monophonic synthesizer Carina in 2022; funding was supported by Arts Promotion Centre Finland. He maintains an archive of tools and software he developed for 8-bit systems, titled Aleksi's Eight Bit Shed.

=== Nokia and Microsoft Mobile ===
Following his work as a freelance game composer, Eeben joined Nokia as a principal sound designer in 2002, although continued to work on demoscene and chiptune-related projects in his own time. During his time at the company he composed ringtones, alerts and other sounds, as well as being responsible for creating DLS sound banks for phones and managing projects. He later served as the creative director of ringtone sets on Lumia models, which included a selection of ringtones performed by the Bratislava Symphony Orchestra and conducted by David Hernando Rico. The team collaborated with Asbjoern Andersen of the music company Epic Sound, who was another former demoscene musician. He also developed a Windows Phone app in 2014 named Nokia Tones, which includes 1000 Nokia ringtones. The team also worked with a jazz band to create ringtones.

=== Music projects ===
Eeben has also released a large number of solo albums and EPs, as well as participating in collaborative albums by CNCD. The first EP he released was Please Annihilate Oulu in 2000, through the net label Monotonik. The label later released Music Box and The White Box in 2002 and 2004 respectively, two collections of SID modules he composed. He later released non-chiptune albums through the label, and has also released albums through the Kahvi net label. His albums are currently self-published on his Bandcamp.

== Works ==
Year	Title	Notes
1994	Elfmania	
2000	Tom and Jerry: Mouse Hunt	
2000	Mean Mr. Mustard	"Cute"
2001	Project S-11	with Jonne Valtonen
2002	Hardcore Pinball	RoboMech music
2011	One Infinite Tunnel	"The Black Salamander"
2015	Kumoon : Ballistic Physics	"Fruits for Druids"
2019	People Vs People	
2020	Smarty and the Nasty Gluttons	with Sami Jarvinen and Juha Kujanpaa; sound effects (with Ville Hyvönen)
2022	Dancing Pandas	sound effects

== Discography ==
=== Albums and EPs ===
- Please Annihilate Oulu (2000)
- Music Box (2002)
- The White Box (2004)
- Spaceman Far Away From Home (2006)
- Three Times The Music (2007)
- The Five Fish Fingers (2007)
- Perseverance (2008)
- Space Age Cherokee (2008)
- Little Man Entered A Big Village (2010)
- Various Secret Continents (2010)
- Fruits For Druids & Vines For Valkyries (2015)
- Dandelion (2021)

==== With CNCD ====
- CNCD (1995)
- Harmaa Vyöhyke (2000) – sounds; with Markku Saarinen
- Harmaa Vyöhyke MMXX (2020)

=== Singles ===
- "The Grand Rules" (2002)
- "Planet of Vines" (2014)
- "Even Cities of Gold" (2020)
- "Resolution" (2022)
