= Shovel Knight: Plague of Shadows =

2015 video game expansion

- Developer: Yacht Club Games
- Publisher: Yacht Club Games
- Composer: Jake Kaufman
- Platforms: Linux; macOS; Nintendo 3DS; PlayStation 3; PlayStation 4; PlayStation Vita; Wii U; Windows; Xbox One; Nintendo Switch
- Release: September 17, 2015; Nintendo Switch; March 3, 2017
- Genre: Platform
- Mode: Single-player

Shovel Knight: Plague of Shadows is a 2015 expansion for the 2014 platform game Shovel Knight, developed and published by Yacht Club Games. The player takes control of Plague Knight, an alchemist on a journey to create the ultimate potion. Plague Knight attacks by throwing alchemical bombs, and has the ability to double jump and perform a more powerful "burst jump" that sends him forward through the air. Gameplay is similar to the original Shovel Knight but features a new story and alterations to the levels to account for Plague Knight's movement.

The game was originally conceived as a minor add-on to Shovel Knight but grew in scale as development commenced. Yacht Club Games decided to retain the levels of the original game while using Plague Knight's abilities and moveset to make the stages feel fun to play again. The team faced trouble balancing the levels, and increased the difficulty of Plague Knight's movement to ensure the game remained challenging. Plague of Shadows received positive reviews on release, particularly for its story and the moveset, with some critics considering it more difficult than its predecessor. Yacht Club Games used player feedback on Plague of Shadows to help design the following Shovel Knight expansion, Specter of Torment.

== Gameplay ==
Plague Knight uses a burst jump to collect a green coin.

Like Shovel Knight, Plague of Shadows is a 2D side-scrolling platform game. Players take control of Plague Knight, an alchemist on a journey to create the ultimate potion. Plague Knight attacks enemies by throwing bombs, and can perform both a double jump and a powerful "burst jump" in which he triggers an explosion beneath himself to send him through the air.

Inside levels are green coins that Plague Knight can give to his assistant, a witch named Mona, who uses them to alter the effects of his bombs or burst jump. These altered effects include bombs which create a wall of fire on the ground, take a longer time to explode, or circle around the player. Altered burst jumps include ones that cause him to fall slowly after jumping or shoot projectiles. Plague Knight features a lower amount of health than Shovel Knight but can drink potions found inside levels to increase his maximum amount. This increase lasts until the player dies.

In addition to Plague Knight's bombs and burst jump, he can gain abilities called Arcana, which are obtained by selling the Relics of the original Shovel Knight when he finds them inside hidden chests. Plague Knight can further collect music sheets that award treasure when given to a certain merchant. The levels of Plague of Shadows are the same as those of the original game, but feature changes to account for Plague Knight's different methods of movement, including new secret passages and areas.

== Plot ==
Running parallel to Shovel Knight, Plague Knight, a member of the Order of No Quarter, plots a scheme. He plans to steal essence from Shovel Knight and the other members of the order to use as ingredients in the ultimate potion, capable of granting any of its user's desires. He is aided by his alchemists and assistant Mona, who pursue alchemy in secret due to the local villagers fearing and rejecting it. Plague Knight gradually defeats the other members of the Order of No Quarter as well as Shovel Knight and gathers their essences into his alchemical machine. While collecting the essences, Mona and Plague Knight are revealed to harbor hidden romantic feelings for each other. Mona later leaves Plague Knight after a conversation with Black Knight, convinced that Plague Knight is only using her as a tool for his scheme.

Once Plague Knight defeats all the knights, he journeys to the Tower of Fate for the Enchantress' essence. He confronts and defeats the Order of No Quarter again, but is knocked off the tower by Shovel Knight while celebrating his victory. As Plague Knight reaches the Enchantress' chamber and finishes the potion with her essence, Black Knight and Mona arrive and try to stop him. Plague Knight reveals that his intention was always to use the potion to win Mona's heart, but she confesses her love for him. Plague Knight attempts to stop the reaction, but it goes out of control, creating a dark version of himself. The real Plague Knight defeats the shadow and stabilizes the potion; Mona and Plague Knight decide to use it to destroy the Tower of Fate. The villagers learn of the tower's destruction, and hail Plague Knight and his alchemists as heroes. In a post-credits scene, Plague Knight and Mona share a dance in their laboratory.

== Development and release ==
As part of the crowdfunding campaign for Shovel Knight on Kickstarter in 2013, Yacht Club Games listed several stretch goals, additional game features added when funding met a certain target. Among the stretch goals were the addition of three playable characters based around the bosses from the original game. The developers held a vote on which bosses would become playable, and Plague Knight was one of the winning characters. Yacht Club Games later decided to increase the scale of their plans and give each of the playable knights their own game.

Plague of Shadows was the first follow-up expansion to Shovel Knight. The developers had never added content to a previous game, and first envisioned the expansion to be similar to Mega Man Powered Up, where the only changes would be the addition of a new character with minor changes to their movements and powers. As production commenced, the team decided to create Plague of Shadows as an independent title. While the developers decided to retain most of the existing levels, they wanted to use Plague Knight's unique mobility make the old stages fun to play again. Although the original Shovel Knight character featured simple movement that was easy to understand, Yacht Club Games hoped to design a character where the player could find new ways to control how they moved.

The developers desired for the playable Plague Knight to act similarly to his boss battle in the original game, and designed the burst jump and bomb attacks to fit his themes of chaos and explosions. Yacht Club Games found it troublesome to balance the game when the player could use the jumping movement to reach every part of the level, and designed Plague Knight's movement to be difficult to control to ensure the game remained challenging. The team cited the greater mobility as a way to make the player feel like they were breaking the levels of the original Shovel Knight. The soundtrack for the game was composed by Jake Kaufman, who had done the same for the original Shovel Knight. The soundtrack features a vocal arrangement by Mint Potion, a musical project founded by Kaufman, vocalist Dale "CorgiKing" North, and Jeff Ball.

The team created the expansion while porting the original game to new platforms, and finished development on August 4, 2015. Plague of Shadows was released on September 17, 2015, for Windows, Linux, macOS, PlayStation 3, PlayStation 4, PlayStation Vita, Nintendo 3DS, Wii U, and Xbox One. A port to Nintendo Switch was launched on March 3, 2017. The expansion was released concurrently with a new Challenge Mode that features gameplay scenarios that the player can complete, including speedruns. After release, Yacht Club Games felt that Plague of Shadows was not effectively advertised as an independent game because of how similar its levels appeared compared to the original Shovel Knight. For their following expansion, Shovel Knight: Specter of Torment, the developers relied upon player feedback for Plague of Shadows to design the playable protagonist and the difficulty balancing.

== Reception ==
Reception

Aggregate scores
Aggregator	Score
Metacritic	PC: 89/100; Wii U: 84/100
OpenCritic	89%

Review scores
Publication	Score
Destructoid	9.5/10
GameTrailers	8.6/10
Nintendo World Report	9/10

According to the review aggregator website Metacritic, Plague of Shadows received "generally favorable reviews" for its PC and Wii U versions. Critics felt that Plague of Shadows was a worthy expansion to Shovel Knight. Nintendo World Report said that the expansion increased the appeal of the original game, while Gamer.nl called it well-designed and executed. Eurogamer and Destructoid wrote that the game felt like an entirely new experience while still reusing content from Shovel Knight. Nintendo Life opined that the game was just as good as the original, and that its use of new and old content gave it a unique feel.

Reviewers highlighted Plague Knight's moveset. Destructoid found Plague Knight to be an agile character, finding him to be more difficult to control than the character of Shovel Knight and featuring more complex combat. Nintendo World Report reiterated Plague Knight's new mobility and controls, adding that the game featured a strategic element with each of the different weapon alterations to choose from. Eurogamer considered Plague Knight's movement to be bizarre, but said that this strangeness made the DLC feel compelling to play.

The story received a positive response. Nintendo Life said that the narrative helped make Plague Knight into a complex character, and helped justify playing through the same platforming levels again. Gamer.nl highlighted how the story ran parallel with the original game, and found it to be comedic and improved Plague Knight's characterization. Other reviewers mentioned the game's difficulty. Nintendo World Report called the expansion more frustrating than the original Shovel Knight, while Nintendo Life found the platforming to be tough because of Plague Knight's abilities. Some critics liked the health potion system. Destructoid called it their favorite mechanical addition, and Nintendo Life said that it added an aspect of risk to the gameplay.
