= Shovel Knight =

2014 video game

- Developer: Yacht Club Games
- Publisher: Yacht Club Games
- Director: Sean Velasco
- Designers: Sean Velasco; Michael Herbster; Alec Faulkner
- Programmers: David D'Angelo; Ian Flood
- Artists: Morgan Guyer; Erin Pellon; Nick Wozniak; Sandy Gordon
- Composers: Jake Kaufman; Manami Matsumae
- Platforms: Nintendo 3DS; Wii U; Windows; macOS; Linux; PlayStation 3; PlayStation 4; PlayStation Vita; Xbox One; Amazon Fire TV; Nintendo Switch
- Release: June 26, 2014: Nintendo 3DS, Wii U; NA: June 26, 2014; PAL: November 5, 2014 Windows; WW: June 26, 2014 PS3, PS4, PS Vita; WW: April 21, 2015 Xbox One; WW: April 29, 2015 Amazon Fire TV; WW: October 5, 2015 Nintendo Switch; WW: March 3, 2017
- Genre: Platform
- Modes: Single-player, multiplayer

Shovel Knight is a 2014 platform game developed and published by Yacht Club Games. Players control the eponymous adventurer as he journeys to save his partner, Shield Knight, while fighting an evil Enchantress and a group of knights called the Order of No Quarter. Shovel Knight uses his shovel to attack, dig, and bounce on enemies as he progresses through levels that end with a boss fight. The player can collect treasure to improve Shovel Knight's abilities or purchase Relics which provide helpful effects. Dying causes players to lose some of their treasure and sends them to the last checkpoint, and they can return to the location of death to recover their lost gold.

Yacht Club Games was founded by former employees of WayForward Technologies, and they began developing Shovel Knight in 2013. They studied many Nintendo Entertainment System (NES) games, drawing inspiration from various sources such as Zelda II: The Adventure of Link (1987), Castlevania III: Dracula's Curse (1989), and the Mega Man franchise. The art was intended to replicate the style of NES titles but with better software and an expanded color palette. The soundtrack was composed largely by Jake Kaufman, who previously worked with the developers at WayForward, and the songs were designed to work entirely on an NES system. Yacht Club Games received feedback from participants at a demo featured at PAX East, and crowdfunded their product through Kickstarter, though the money raised was insufficient to cover the development costs. After several delays, the game was first released on June 26, 2014.

Shovel Knight received critical acclaim, with reviewers considering it one of the greatest video games ever made. Critics felt that it replicated the feel of games in the 8-bit era, and praised the checkpoint system, level design, soundtrack, and bosses. Yacht Club Games released multiple expansions, including three additional campaigns titled Plague of Shadows (2015), Specter of Torment (2017), and King of Cards, (2019) and a multiplayer fighting game titled Shovel Knight Showdown (2019). With the release of these expansions, the original campaign received the retronym Shovel of Hope. The expansions were released as standalone games, or as part of a compilation called Shovel Knight: Treasure Trove.

Yacht Club Games started a franchise with Shovel Knight, and the eponymous character has appeared in dozens of other video games. A spin-off roguelike-puzzle game, Shovel Knight Pocket Dungeon, was co-developed with Vine and first released on December 13, 2021. A prequel, a roguelike game titled Shovel Knight Dig, was co-developed with Nitrome and first released on September 23, 2022. An improved version of the original campaign called Shovel of Hope DX is in development.

== Gameplay ==
Pre-release screenshot depicting Shovel Knight digging through dirt blocks

Shovel Knight is a 2D side-scrolling platform game with an 8-bit graphical style. In the base campaign retroactively titled Shovel of Hope, players control the eponymous adventurer as he goes on a journey to rescue his partner Shield Knight while fighting the Enchantress and her Order of No Quarter. Shovel Knight can jump, attack with his shovel, dig through dirt blocks, unearth treasure, or use this tool to bounce upon enemies and objects.

Levels are themed around the individual knights of the Order of No Quarter, feature several checkpoints, and end with a boss fight against one of the order's eight members. Each section of the world map contains two or three knights, and the player must defeat all of them to progress to the next area. Aside from the main quest, players are encouraged to collect treasure to improve Shovel Knight's abilities.

By finding a salesman named Chester hidden inside levels, the player can purchase items called Relics with treasure. These Relics provide helpful effects and are powered using a resource called magic. Examples of Relics include a locket that grants temporary invulnerability, or a wand that shoots fireballs. The player can further use treasure to buy useful upgrades for Shovel Knight's health, magic capacity, armor, or shovel. For example, an upgrade for the shovel allows it to shoot projectiles whenever Shovel Knight is at maximum health. Some levels contain hidden music sheets that the player can give to a non-player character called the bard; trading these sheets awards treasure and the ability to sound test each of the game's music tracks.

Dying in Shovel Knight causes the player to lose a portion of their treasure at the location of death, and the player can return to this location to recover their lost gold. If the player dies again before claiming this treasure, it is lost forever. As an optional challenge, players have the choice of destroying checkpoints to be awarded treasure, at the risk of being sent back to an earlier location in the level should they die. Completing the game unlocks a more difficult New Game Plus mode, which reduces the number of available checkpoints and increases the damage Shovel Knight takes.

=== Expansions and platform-exclusive features ===
Free updates add new features to the game, including a "Challenge Mode" where the player can complete difficult tasks such as speedrunning or repeat battles with the game's bosses. There are local cooperative multiplayer features which allow two players to complete levels in tandem, and co-op on Nintendo platforms is compatible with Shovel Knight series amiibo figures, allowing players to store customized characters or summon cosmetic fairies. A body swap mode allows players to alter the genders or identifying pronouns of certain characters in the Shovel of Hope campaign.

Three additional single-player campaigns titled Plague of Shadows, Specter of Torment, and King of Cards focus on different playable characters who appear as bosses in the Shovel of Hope campaign. Plague of Shadows casts players as Plague Knight, who uses bombs to attack enemies and can use both a double jump and a powerful "burst jump" to launch himself through the air. Specter of Torment is centered around Specter Knight, who can run up walls, jump off of them, and use his scythe to slash enemies and obstacles. King of Cards puts players in control of King Knight, who has a shoulder bash which turns into a spin attack upon colliding with enemies or objects. King Knight's campaign features a card battle mini-game called "Joustus", in which players place cards on a field to claim spaces marked with gems. In addition to these campaigns, Shovel Knight features a multiplayer fighting game add-on called Shovel Knight Showdown. In Showdown, up to four players compete in various game modes using playable fighters based around characters in the franchise. The game includes a single-player story mode which can be completed to unlock new fighters and levels.

Shovel Knight has several version-exclusive features such as unique boss battles; a boss version of Kratos from God of War appears in the PlayStation ports, while Rare's Battletoads are included as enemies in the Xbox One and Windows versions. The Nintendo 3DS version features a StreetPass arena mode, which lets players record themselves moving around an arena and attempting to defeat an invisible enemy. The recording is then sent to other players connected through StreetPass, allowing the recorded player characters to fight each other in combat.

== Plot ==
Shovel Knight and his partner Shield Knight are renowned and successful adventurers, but while exploring the Tower of Fate, an amulet curses Shield Knight and leaves Shovel Knight stranded outside of the sealed tower. Grieving for his friend, Shovel Knight gives up adventuring and goes into self-imposed exile. During his absence, a powerful being known as the Enchantress rises to power, spreading evil across the land. Upon hearing that the Enchantress has unsealed the Tower of Fate, Shovel Knight resolves to journey back to it, hoping to find and rescue Shield Knight. To reach the tower, Shovel Knight confronts and defeats the members of the Order of No Quarter, a group of knights serving the Enchantress.

Across his journey towards the Tower of Fate, Shovel Knight continuously battles with his old rival Black Knight. After he defeats Black Knight for a final time at the outskirts of the tower, Black Knight reveals that the Enchantress is actually Shield Knight, who is possessed by an evil spirit that inhabits the amulet. Shovel Knight ascends the tower and defeats the Order of No Quarter again, before battling the Enchantress. He manages to exorcise the evil spirit, turning her back into Shield Knight. The amulet transforms into a powerful monster known as the Remnant of Fate, which Shovel Knight and Shield Knight defeat together. Shield Knight holds back the Remnant of Fate as the tower collapses, while Black Knight carries an unconscious Shovel Knight to safety. He leaves Shovel Knight by his campfire and departs. A post-credits scene shows Shield Knight, who managed to escape the collapsing tower, lying next to Shovel Knight as he sleeps.

== Development ==
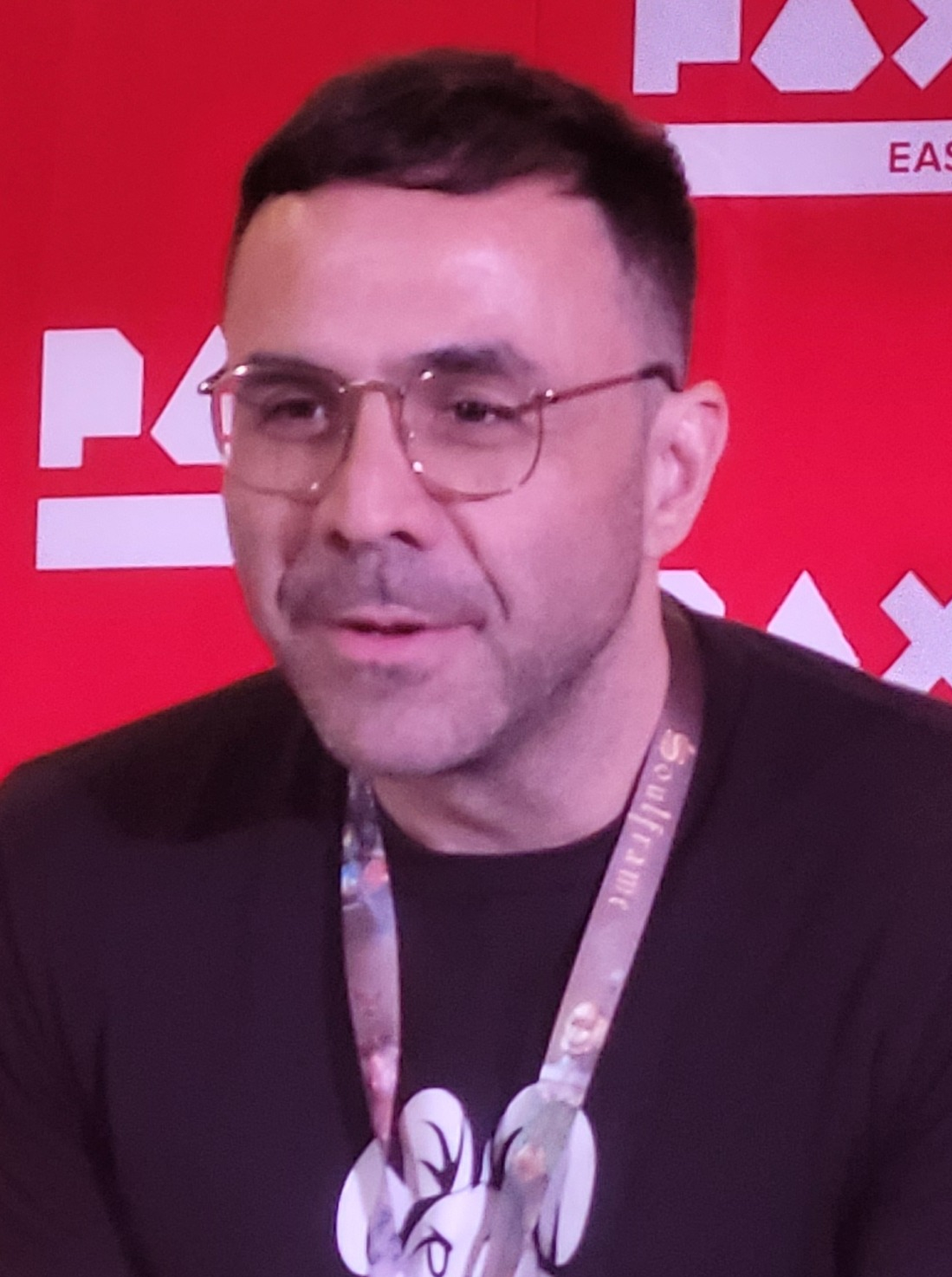
Director Sean Velasco

Yacht Club Games was founded by former employees of the video game company WayForward Technologies. The concept behind Shovel Knight was conceived in January 2013. Designer Nick Wozniak stated that the idea for the game started out as "sort of as a joke conversation over lunch that kind of got too serious". The team was inspired by several Nintendo Entertainment System (NES) games, and eventually the sword-thrust move from Zelda II: The Adventure of Link was cited as a move that the designers liked. They believed that this move would be better suited for a shovel instead of a sword. Director Sean Velasco said that the decision of the protagonist's name was "pretty much settled" after the first brainstorming session, with the name "Plummet Knight" being the only other suggestion.

The game was revealed on March 15, 2013, alongside the launch of a Kickstarter campaign to crowdfund development, with a minimum goal of US$75,000. Before the launch of the crowdfunding campaign, Yacht Club Games was put in contact with Dan Adelman, the director of digital content development at Nintendo of America. Adelman liked the game and was able to provide support with publishing and development. The campaign went on to collect a total of $311,502, fulfilling all announced "stretch goals" for additional features by its end on April 13. Those goals included a four-player battle mode, a mission-based challenge setting, a body swap mode, and additional playable story campaigns for three boss characters.

The campaign had numerous rewards for backers, including an art book and special bags of dirt decorated to symbolize members of the Order of No Quarter. In combination with money brought through PayPal donations, Yacht Club Games raised a total of $328,682. The team provided a demo for Shovel Knight at PAX East, and received favorable coverage from video game websites. The amount the developers raised was insufficient to cover the game's costs, and they had to delay the release date, leading them to work the last months of its development without payment.

=== Design ===
Yacht Club Games performed research on various NES games to help with their design, and they learned about the innovations and drawbacks of early and late NES titles. Despite being a 2D platform game, Shovel Knight was designed in a 3D engine, which allowed for the developers to easily port it to different platforms and allow for the finding and removal of bugs. The developers followed feedback from players of the PAX demo and other interested people, who helped them fix bugs and provided inspiration for mechanics and stretch goals for the Kickstarter campaign.

The Order of No Quarter was inspired by the Robot Masters, characters from the Mega Man franchise that serve as its main bosses. Castlevania III: Dracula's Curse influenced how they designed the items of Shovel Knight to give them multiples utilities. The developers drew inspiration for the checkpoint design from Dark Souls, and attributed smaller influences to DuckTales, Super Mario Bros. 3, and U.N. Squadron. Yacht Club Games gave attention to Shovel Knight's movement, designing it so the character would slide after moving horizontally, though this movement could be prevented by jumping. The team was concerned about the difficulty, wanting to create an experience with improved balancing compared to traditional NES games. This led to them avoiding a lives system and implementing the mechanic where the player can retrieve their treasure upon death. An optional boss was designed by Matthew Kowalewski and Woolie Madden of Super Best Friends Play as part of a backer reward.

The story was underdeveloped at first, with the developers focusing only on the main character. They sought to create both a humorous experience with tragic elements, and originally made the game end with Shield Knight's death and Shovel Knight burying her corpse. According to programmer David D'Angelo, Shield Knight was originally supposed to be a princess, as the creators were using NES era damsel-in-distress characters like Roll, Peach, and Zelda as inspirations. Due to her lack of character, she was referred to as "Princess McGuffin" within the team. They eventually rewrote her to be a skilled and heroic fighter, and altered the narrative after finding that the tragic elements overpowered the humor.

=== Art and music ===
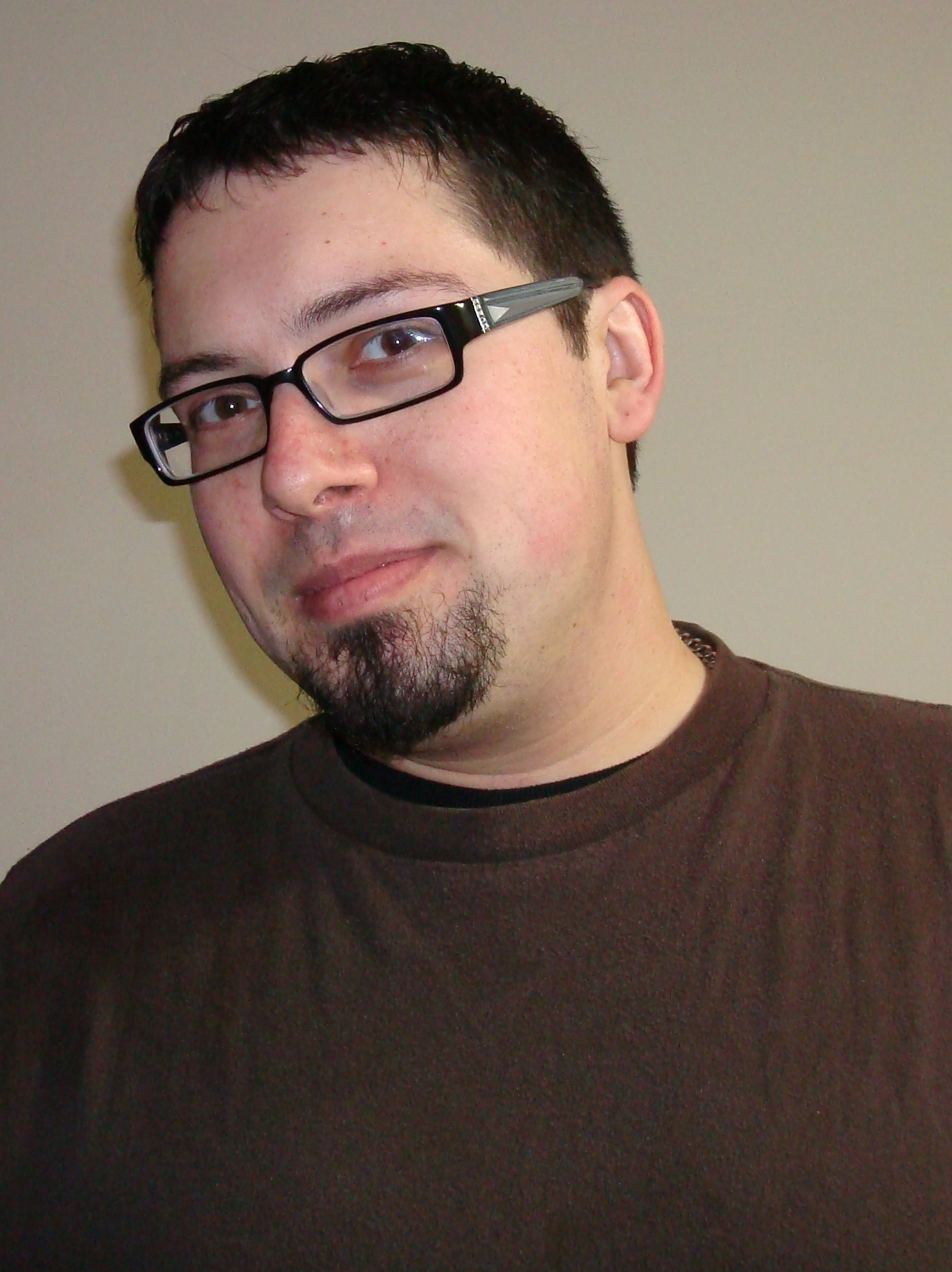
Composer Jake Kaufman

The developers hoped to replicate the art of NES titles, but with alterations and better software. The art of the game avoided problems with sprites which were present on the NES console, such as a "flickering" effect. The game itself was designed with a resolution that allows for more horizontal space for gameplay, and it contains significant parallax scrolling that was difficult to create on the NES. The team placed emphasis on designing the pixel art, as there were a limited number of shades to choose from on the color palette for the NES. Shovel Knight includes four pixel colors not found on the NES color palette, which the developers used for various purposes, such as to help with the transitioning between different shades. The developers included advanced visuals that were difficult to recreate on the NES, including camera shake effects and complex sprites.

For the "Body Swap" mode, Yacht Club Games felt that many video games lacked gender diversity, and sought to create a mode that would allow players to customize the gender presentation and bodies of the main characters individually. The developers avoided altering the hitboxes of the cast, and characters with stronger gender presentations were given more apparent designs, in contrast to other members who were altered in subtle ways. For example, Black Knight retained an androgynous appearance but with different armor, while the "Enchanter" was given a samurai-inspired design, similar to that of Ganondorf in the Super Smash Bros. series, in contrast to the Enchantress' original robed appearance.

"Strike the Earth!"
The music in Shovel Knight is written to use the VRC6 sound chip, which adds three additional audio channels to the NES.

Shovel Knight features chiptune music composed by Jake Kaufman, with two contributions by Mega Man (1987) composer Manami Matsumae. The soundtrack was released for download via Bandcamp on the same day as the game, as was a rearrangement album. Kaufman was friends with the developers, and had previously worked on the soundtracks for several entries in the Shantae franchise. He created the songs using FamiTracker, a software used to create music in the same style as NES games. Kaufman emphasized a bombastic and dramatic audio style; the soundtrack took a year to develop, and can be played entirely on an NES system. When the audio finished production, it was subject to equalization and compression, and the in-game sound effects were allowed to play simultaneously with the soundtrack, in contrast to the NES where the effects could interrupt the sound channel where the music was playing.

== Release ==
The game was originally slated for release in September 2013, but was delayed into early 2014. After various further delays, Yacht Club Games announced on June 5 that the game would be released on June 26, 2014. It was launched on that date for the Wii U, Nintendo 3DS, and Windows through Steam. It arrived on the European Nintendo eShop for the 3DS and Wii U on November 5, 2014. Shovel Knight was eventually released on PlayStation 3, PlayStation 4, and PlayStation Vita on April 21, 2015. An Xbox One port was finalized on April 29. A version for the Amazon Fire TV was released on October 5, 2015, and various platforms got a physical media release in October 13. The game is available through Linux and macOS. A Japanese localization created by 8-4 was launched in 2016. A port to Nintendo Switch became available on March 3, 2017.

Prior to 2017, the game was sold under the name Shovel Knight, with the various additional campaigns appearing as free downloadable content (DLC). An update made the original story campaign and DLC campaigns available for standalone purchase, with the original campaign being renamed Shovel of Hope. A compilation of all the campaigns was released as Shovel Knight: Treasure Trove, with all previous purchases being updated to the Treasure Trove edition. The collection first became available for the Nintendo Switch, and released on Windows through Steam beginning on April 9, 2017. On launch, it contained Shovel of Hope, Plague of Shadows, and Specter of Torment. King of Cards and Showdown were added to the collection after their release on December 10, 2019.

== Reception ==
Reception

Aggregate score
| Aggregator | Score |
|---|---|
| Metacritic | (Vita) 92/100 (NS) 91/100 (3DS) 90/100 (PS4) 90/100 (WIIU) 88/100 (XONE) 86/100 (PC) 85/100 |

Review scores
| Publication | Score |
|---|---|
| Eurogamer | 7/10 |
| GameSpot | 7/10 |
| Hardcore Gamer | 4.5/5 |
| IGN | 9/10 |
| Nintendo Life | 9/10 |
| Shacknews | 8/10 |
| USgamer | 5/5 |

Shovel Knight received universal acclaim, according to review aggregator platform Metacritic. Reception was "generally favorable" for Wii U, Xbox One and PC. Several critics felt that the game recreated the feel of games in the 8-bit era. Shacknews wrote that the game replicated the atmosphere of the NES time period but with its own positive innovations, while USgamer said that it felt fresh despite using mechanics from older games. IGN contended that despite taking influence from NES titles, the experience was unique and well designed. Polygon and Kotaku said that it replicated the strengths and removed all of the disadvantages of the 8-bit era, while GameSpot felt that it demonstrated the endurance of earlier video games. Numerous outlets have listed Shovel Knight as among the greatest video games ever made. (Note: Attributed to multiple references.)

The checkpoint system was praised. Hardcore Gamer believed that it was a creative addition, saying that it was rewarding for players who were daring enough to want the extra treasure, while encouraging them to play cautiously. IGN concurred, writing that the checkpoints rewarded cautious players though it did not punish reckless ones as much as other NES games such as Castlevania III. USgamer appreciated that the game did not have a lives feature, giving the reviewer time to enjoy the levels and test new strategies. GameSpot and Shacknews wrote that the amount of checkpoints made the game fair and encouraged them to keep playing, but GameSpot felt that they sometimes made Shovel Knight too easy and discouraged experimentation with gameplay techniques. Siliconera lauded the checkpoints, saying that their addition helped balance the experience and that they were the most important feature. The controls were described as easy to understand, and effective.

The level design was positively received. Critics found them to be distinct and praised their mechanics. USgamer found the levels more difficult than the bosses, calling their designs unique, and acknowledging their increasing complexity. IGN liked their art design, highlighting the artwork of the backgrounds in particular. PC Gamer found the levels difficult, giving particular attention to the different enemies and platforming. GameSpot felt that each stage would challenge the player in unique ways. The reviewer praised the inclusion of secret areas, but felt as though they offered underwhelming rewards. Hardcore Gamer said that the levels were excellent at teaching player's the game's varied mechanics without affecting the pacing. The level "The Lich Yard" containing Specter Knight was considered a highlight by PC Gamer and GamesRadar. In a more critical review, Eurogamer contended that the formatting of the levels was weak.

The Order of No Quarter was very well received. Reviewers appreciated their designs. Nintendo World Report praised their characterizations and animations, saying that they were standout despite their short appearances in gameplay. Eurogamer called their boss battles among the high points of the game, and Shacknews and GamesRadar found these battles unique and fun. GameSpot said that the boss fights remained difficult and engaging across multiple playthroughs, heavily testing the player's skills and knowledge. Vandal called the bosses entertaining, but said that some items would make them too easy to defeat. The enemy design had a divided response. Eurogamer said that they were distinct, while IGN found the enemies less appealing compared to the bosses. Vandal felt that some of the enemies were too similar across levels, which was concurred by Destructoid. The soundtrack was considered a highlight. GameRevolution and PCMag found it to be reminiscent of the music of the Mega Man series, while USgamer found the songs to be nostalgic and appealing, convincing the reviewer to stop playing to listen to the music.

=== Sales ===
Including Kickstarter backers, 180,000 copies of Shovel Knight were sold within one month of the North American launch. 49,000 copies were sold on Wii U, 59,000 were sold on 3DS, and 66,000 were sold on Steam. As of June 30, 2015, more than 700,000 copies had been sold. By September 2019, 2.65 million copies had been sold.

=== Accolades ===
List of awards and nominations
| Year | Awards | Category | Result | Ref. |
|---|---|---|---|---|
| 2014 | The Game Awards 2014 | Best Independent Game | Won | |
| 2014 | National Academy of Video Game Trade Reviewers (NAVGTR) awards | Original Light Mix Score, New IP | Nominated | |
| 2014 | National Academy of Video Game Trade Reviewers (NAVGTR) awards | Game, Original Action | Nominated | |
2015
| 2015 | 18th Annual D.I.C.E. Awards | Handheld Game of the Year | Nominated | |

== Legacy ==
Shovel Knight was a financial success, and it helped Yacht Club Games become a publisher of third-party games such as Azure Striker Gunvolt and Cyber Shadow. An amiibo figure of Shovel Knight was revealed in 2015, as the first amiibo toy produced by a third party. It was released on January 9, 2016. An amiibo 3-pack containing Plague Knight, Specter Knight, and King Knight was released in 2019 along with a gold variant of the previously released Shovel Knight figure.

The protagonist of Shovel Knight has appeared in dozens of video games as a guest character, leading to outlets to compare him to Stan Lee. He appears as a playable character in games such as Indie Pogo, Blade Strangers, Cook, Serve, Delicious!, and Rivals of Aether. Shovel Knight appears as a non-playable character in Yooka-Laylee, and Bloodstained: Ritual of the Night, and he appears as an assist trophy in Super Smash Bros. Ultimate. He has cosmetics based on his design featured in Fall Guys, and a card featuring the character was released for Balatro. The music of Shovel Knight is also featured in Just Shapes & Beats, and Voez. Yacht Club Games collaborated with Arby's in March 2021 to release a set of toys, which included Arby's-themed cheat codes.

A roguelike-puzzle game titled Shovel Knight Pocket Dungeon was first released on December 13, 2021 for macOS, PlayStation 4, Nintendo Switch, and Windows. Gameplay is set on a 8x8 grid, and allows the player to move in four directions. Enemies continue to spawn at the top of the grid, and players must move into their spaces to attack them. The game received "generally favorable reviews" according to Metacritic. A prequel titled Shovel Knight Dig was co-developed with Nitrome, and was first released on September 23, 2022 for Nintendo Switch, Windows, iOS, and tvOS (via Apple Arcade). It is a roguelike game, and involves Shovel Knight descending down a hole to defeat the villainous Drill Knight and his minions, the Hexcavators. Gameplay involves collecting upgrades which are lost once the player dies, though they can spend treasure to purchase permanent upgrades. Shovel Knight Dig received "generally favorable reviews" according to Metacritic.

Yacht Club Games began developing a 3D Shovel Knight game in 2020, and first teased it in 2024. The studio had been developing the title at the same time as its other project, Mina the Hollower, though the company was eventually forced to concentrate all of its efforts on the latter game. This was due to financial problems, which were stabilized following the launch of Mina. An improved version of the original campaign titled Shovel of Hope DX is in development, which contains multiplayer and challenge systems, several playable characters, and a "rewind feature".
