= Project S-11 =

2001 video game

- Developer: Paragon 5
- Publisher: Sunsoft USA
- Designers: Paul Bragiel; Stéphane Hockenhull; Francis Bernier
- Composers: Jonne Valtonen; Aleksi Eeben
- Platform: Game Boy Color
- Release: NA: January 3, 2001
- Genre: Shoot 'em up
- Mode: Single player

Project S-11 is a game developed by Paragon 5 and published by Sunsoft for the Game Boy Color. It was released exclusively in North America on January 3, 2001.

== Gameplay ==
Gameplay of Project S-11

The game is played in a manner similar to a shoot 'em up arcade game. Players control the S-11 fighter, which can freely move across the top-down oriented screen. Waves of enemies come from the top of screen (and occasionally the side and the bottom of the screen) which the player must attempt to destroy to gain points. Players can collect various power-ups, which will make their weapons stronger or give them an extra life. Players will fight a mini boss half-way through a level, and a larger boss at the end of each level.

== Development and release ==
Project S-11 was developed by Paragon 5 and published by Sunsoft. The name was originally supposed to be a placeholder, with a contest being held to name it. Along with getting to name the game, the winner would appear in the game credits and received a cash prize of $200. In 2025, it received a physical rereleased by ModRetro.

== Reception ==
Reception

Review scores
Publication	Score
Computer and Video Games	4/5
GameSpot	6.3/10
IGN	8/10
Official Nintendo Magazine	88%

IGN praised the game for its lack of slowdown and for its excellent gameplay. GameSpot wrote of the game, "Project S-11 is about the best the GBC is going to see in terms of space shooters." Jonny Dimaline for Retro Gamer described the game as having better graphics than gameplay. Reviewing the ModRetro version, Willem Hilhorst for Nintendo World Report called it "a pretty great shmup on Game Boy Color", giving praise for its soundtrack.
