= Karnaaj Rally =

2002 video game

- North American cover art
- Developers: Paragon 5, Infinite Dreams
- Publisher: Jaleco Entertainment
- Composer: Jake Kaufman
- Platforms: Game Boy Advance, Symbian OS
- Release: NA: December 20, 2002
- Genres: Racing game, Vehicular combat game
- Modes: Single-player, multiplayer

Karnaaj Rally is a racing and vehicular combat game for the Game Boy Advance handheld video game console developed by Polish game developer, Infinite Dreams. It was released on November 21, 2002. The game was well received by critics. It was re-released on UIQ3 platforms as K-Rally in 2007. It uses 3D polygons.

== Gameplay ==
Karnaaj Rally is a racing game in top-down perspective.

The player takes the role of a racer with a sponsor. The player is able to make bets, buy armor, upgrade their engine or tires and maintain leadership by winning races. Races are divided into seasons. The final race consists of a lunar race.

A single player quick race.

== Reception ==
Reception

Aggregate scores
Aggregator	Score
GameRankings	80%
Metacritic	81/100

Review scores
Publication	Score
GameSpot	7.8/10
IGN	8.8/10
Nintendo World Report	9/10

Karnaaj Rally received generally favorable reviews. The title maintains an 80% ranking on GameRankings as well as an 81 out of 100 score on Metacritic based on 9 reviews. It received an 8.8 "Great" rating from IGN. It also obtained a "good" rating of 7.8/10 from GameSpot in which it is called "a blast to play". The publication later named it the best Game Boy Advance game of January 2003.

The box art for Karnaaj Rally was criticized by many video game reviewers and publications. It was featured in 1UP.com's feature titled "Hey Covers... You Suck!" in which it is described as "..the world's ugliest man jump[ing] in front of the camera." IGN's review of the game, although very positive, states that it is "hard to ignore the crappy name and awful package design" and advises readers to "Never judge a book by its cover."

Seanbaby was criticized by readers when, in the June 2003 issue of Electronic Gaming Monthly (issue 167), he reviewed the game based solely on the cover without having played the game. He later played it and reviewed it with "it wasn't as bad as it looked like it'd be" in response to the criticism.
