= Shovel Knight Dig =

2022 video game

- Developers: Nitrome; Yacht Club Games
- Publisher: Yacht Club Games
- Composer: Jake Kaufman
- Series: Shovel Knight
- Platforms: Nintendo Switch; Windows; iOS; tvOS; PlayStation 5; Xbox Series X/S
- Release: Windows, Switch, iOS, tvOS; September 23, 2022; PS5, Xbox Series X/S; May 15, 2025
- Genres: Platform, Roguelike
- Mode: Single-player

Shovel Knight Dig is a 2022 roguelite platform game developed by Nitrome and Yacht Club Games and published by Yacht Club Games. It is an entry in the Shovel Knight franchise and a prequel to the original game. The player controls the protagonist Shovel Knight as he fights enemies and collects treasure while descending down a hole to recover his stolen treasure bag. When the player dies, they lose all obtained upgrades, returning to the surface with a fraction of the treasure they collected while playing. At the surface, they can spend treasure on a variety of items that make gameplay easier.

Yacht Club Games was beginning to show fatigue from supporting the Shovel Knight franchise for several years and decided to pass on development to mobile game studio Nitrome. Both developers conceived Shovel Knight Dig as an arcade-style game where the player continuously moves downwards. The teams cited Downwell as one of the game's earliest inspirations and drew further influence from Spelunky and Dig Dug.

Shovel Knight Dig launched for Windows, Nintendo Switch, and iOS and tvOS through Apple Arcade on September 23, 2022. The game received positive reviews from critics, who praised the level design, bosses, graphics and music. However, the roguelike style of gameplay divided reviewers, with many calling it an unnecessary addition. A free DLC called Fate and Fortune was released for iOS and PC on March 17, 2023. Another free DLC titled Wicked Wishes was released on May 15, 2025 alongside ports for PlayStation 5 and Xbox Series X/S.

== Gameplay ==
Shovel Knight (top right) uses his shovel to bounce upon an insectoid enemy.

Shovel Knight Dig is a roguelite platform game. Controlling the eponymous adventurer, the player descends down a hole to stop the villainous Drill Knight and his minions, the Hexcavators. Shovel Knight can jump, dig horizontally and downwards, attack with his shovel, and bounce upon enemies and objects. A playthrough consists of four separate sections, each composed of three procedurally generated levels and a boss fight with one of the Hexcavators.

As the player progresses through the levels, they encounter secret passages, harmful obstacles, and collectable treasure. Players cannot remain in the same location for too long, or an unstoppable buzzsaw will follow them through the level and kill Shovel Knight upon contact. Gameplay is centered around collecting as much treasure as possible to buy useful upgrades at shops, such as increased hit points or limited-use Relics that provide various effects.

In addition to shops, Shovel Knight can find three golden gears within each level as an optional objective, which give additional heath or a power-up if all are collected. Shovel Knight Dig has been frequently compared to Downwell, as both feature digging down from a vertical perspective, fighting enemies, and collecting treasure. A permadeath feature causes Shovel Knight to lose all upgrades upon dying, returning the player to the surface with a portion of their collected treasure. At the surface, the player may spend the treasure on a variety of items, including tickets that allow Shovel Knight to start at a later section, sets of armor that provide useful benefits, or keys that can unlock new Relics.

== Plot ==
Shovel Knight Dig is a prequel to Shovel Knight. A troublemaking thief named Drill Knight steals Shovel Knight's treasure bag, escaping by digging a hole into the earth. Angered, Shovel Knight follows Drill Knight down the hole, learning that his adversary has assembled a digging crew of evil knights called the Hexcavators. Shovel Knight later convenes with his adventuring partner Shield Knight, and the two resolve to defeat Drill Knight and reclaim the bag. After descending down the hole and defeating some of the Hexcavators, Shovel Knight returns to the surface, watching as the nearby Tower of Fate falls underground due to Drill Knight's tunnels. Catching up to the Hexcavators, Shovel Knight learns that the team was assembled to search for a secret treasure, which they intend to sell in exchange for wealth and fame; they are aided by Drill Knight's ultimate weapon, the indestructible Omega Saw, which has been pursuing Shovel Knight through the tunnels. At Drill Knight's underground castle, Shield Knight stays behind to hold off the castle's traps, leaving Shovel Knight to face Drill Knight alone. Emerging victorious, Shovel Knight reclaims his bag and returns to the surface with Shield Knight.

If the player performs a number of optional puzzles across a playthrough, they instead experience an alternative ending. During the fight with Drill Knight, Shovel Knight manages to destroy the Omega Saw using a weapon called the Omega Driver, which accidentally cracks open the floor, revealing a hidden vault connected to the Tower of Fate. By inserting magical gems obtained by defeating the Hexcavators, Shovel Knight unlocks the chamber, with Drill Knight entering after he realizes that it leads to the secret treasure. Shovel Knight gives pursuit, confronting the Hexcavators just as they unearth the treasure: a magical amulet housing an evil spirit called the Enchantress. Drill Knight accidentally releases the Enchantress, allowing the spirit to transform him into a powerful monster. Shovel Knight and Shield Knight work together to defeat the monster, sealing the Enchantress back inside the amulet. The Tower of Fate begins rising to the surface, forcing them to leave the amulet behind and escape the collapsing hole. In a post-credits scene, Shovel Knight shows his partner an old relic he kept inside the bag, which he uses to open the secret entrance to their former hideout, the Burrow. The two resolve to reclaim the amulet from the Tower of Fate and prevent it from being used for evil. (Note: As depicted in Shovel Knight (2014))

=== Wicked Wishes ===
At the surface, Shovel Knight discovers an Adventurers Guild ran by the shopkeeper Hoofman and his "Hooflings," small creatures that perform his chores. While initially clean and prosperous, the guild slowly falls into disrepair, forcing the Hooflings to overwork. Shovel Knight discovers a secret room containing a lamp, which when struck summons a genie known as the Lamp Lord. Accepting Shovel Knight as his new master, the Lamp Lord agrees to aid him and terminates his last master's wish.

Hoofman reveals that he was the Lamp Lord's former master, saying that he wished for another version of himself, in which the Lamp Lord summoned the Hooflings to help with his chores. However, Hoofman learned that the wish came with a curse: the decay of his guild, which caused the Hooflings to become overworked. With Shovel Knight as the new master, Hoofman's wish was undone, causing the Hooflings to disappear. Shovel Knight and Shield Knight venture into the hole to confront the Lamp Lord, who agrees to release the Hooflings if Shovel Knight defeats him in his lamp. Upon Shovel Knight's victory, the Lamp Lord reveals he is actually a con artist who used numerous theatrics and techniques to trick people into believing he was a real genie. Shovel Knight and Shield Knight agree to let him go in exchange for his aid during their journey. Once they return to the guild, Hoofman is delighted to see his Hooflings back and begins helping with their workload himself.

== Development and release ==
Shovel Knight Dig was developed in a collaboration between Yacht Club Games, the creator of the original Shovel Knight, and mobile game studio Nitrome. The team at Yacht Club Games was beginning to show fatigue from supporting the Shovel Knight franchise for several years, and they decided to pass on development of a new game to a third-party. Nitrome was chosen as a developer for the new game, with both studios conceiving Shovel Knight Dig as an arcade-style game where the player continuously moves downwards. Development lasted a total of four years, with Yacht Club Games openly discussing different concepts and ideas with Nitrome, while checking on the team on a weekly basis. The teams cited Downwell as one of the game's earliest inspirations, and drew further influence from Spelunky and Dig Dug.

Shovel Knight Dig was announced without a release date on August 28, 2019, and was delayed in November 2021 for a 2022 release. The game was launched for Nintendo Switch, Windows, iOS, and tvOS (via Apple Arcade) on September 23, 2022. A free DLC update called Fate and Fortune was released for iOS and PC on March 17, 2023, introducing quality-of-life changes, a music track from Jake Kaufman, and a new "Knightmare Mode" available to players who had already completed the game. A second and final DLC update for the game, Wicked Wishes, was announced in June 2024. It was released on May 15, 2024 alongside ports for PlayStation 5 and Xbox Series X/S.

== Reception ==
Reception

Aggregate score
Aggregator	Score
Metacritic	81/100 (PC); 85/100 (Switch); 79/100 (iOS)

Review scores
Publication	Score
Destructoid	8.5/10
Electronic Gaming Monthly	5/5
Eurogamer	Recommended
Game Informer	8/10
GameSpot	8/10
IGN	8/10
Nintendo Life	9/10
PCMag	4/5

According to review aggregator website Metacritic, Shovel Knight Dig received "generally favorable" reviews.

Critics described the game as a worthy successor to Shovel Knight, and found its gameplay to be unpredictable and intense. Many compared the game to Downwell, and appreciated the platforming gameplay, finding it reminiscent of the original game. However, the roguelike mechanics divided critics. Destructoid felt as though as though the game effectively combined the platforming with a satisfying roguelike style, while other reviewers felt as though these mechanics were unnecessary. Game Informer wrote that he would rarely think about the roguelike features during gameplay, and felt as though the style of progression common to other games in the genre was absent. PCMag echoed this sentiment, saying that Shovel Knight Dig did not feel unique in an indie game market saturated with the roguelike style.

The game's graphics and music received praise. Electronic Gaming Monthly liked how the style of the graphics and musics compared to games of the 16-bit era, saying that it felt like an upgrade compared to the original Shovel Knight’s 8-bit inspired design. Nintendo Life agreed with this opinion, although he noted that the music felt less memorable than the original, which he said may be a consequence of the fast-paced gameplay. Other reviewers appreciated the boss fights, which TouchArcade found to be the most similar aspect of gameplay to the original.

The level design was positively received, although reviewers noted that their layouts would become familiar over time. Destructoid felt as though some of the level generations were easier than others, and noticed that the procedural generation would gradually change enemy layouts and behaviors. GameSpot liked this addition, saying that "It's like a magic trick: over and over you'll see things that are the same, but also different." On the other hand, PCMag wrote that levels would become less and less interesting once the player learned their unique mechanics, saying that compared to the original Shovel Knight, "Dig feels a bit like a step back". Nintendo Life dissented, writing that the generated levels felt like they were made by humans and not a computer programs, due to their unique mechanics. The reviewer found the game to be a challenging and well-made platformer, despite calling it a shorter entry in the series.
