= Elfmania =

1994 video game

- Developer: Terramarque
- Publisher: Renegade Software
- Composer: Aleksi Eeben
- Platform: Amiga
- Release: 1994
- Genre: Fighting
- Modes: Single-player, multiplayer

Elfmania is a 2D fighting game developed by Terramarque and released by Renegade Software in 1994 for the Amiga.

== Gameplay ==
The gameplay is a standard fighting game, but Elfmania does not have special moves triggered by various button combinations, as is typical in most other games of this type. Instead, there are only a few standard attacks and one special move for each character. In order to win the game, different characters have to be used, which need to be bought. To buy more expensive and stronger characters, the player collects gold coins as a reward for beating enemies.

Multiplayer fights use an odd variation of tic-tac-toe: the game has an overhead map consisting of squares. Players choose where to fight, and the square is marked with the winner's symbol. Getting a line of six squares wins the game.

== Characters ==
There are a total of six characters to choose from, in order of cost to hire and with the first three costing the same amount of gold:

- Janika, an elf who chose to live as a pirate and the only female fighter in the game.
- Tenko, an elf who lives in the forest.
- Taiki, known as the Ice Elf and hailing from a wintry village.
- Seven, chief of the Royal guard. He fights using a scimitar.
- Kosken, a strong and bulky fighter and the kingdom's executioner.
- Matiki, ruler of the Elven kingdom and the most expensive fighter to hire. He fights using a war hammer.

== Reception ==
The game enjoyed mixed reviews. One group received it very well: for example, a CU Amiga review rated it as 93% and praised it for bringing the quality of console beat 'em ups to the Amiga. Amiga Magazine rated it 10/10, and Amiga Format 92%.

On the other hand, Amiga Power granted it only 61%, and the Swedish Datormagazin awarded only 1/5 points. This latter group argued that while the game was outstanding graphically, it fell short of any real gameplay.
