= Trouballs =

2001 video game

- Developer: Paragon Five
- Producer: Capcom Entertainment
- Platform: Game Boy Color
- Release: NA: September 26, 2001
- Genre: Puzzle
- Mode: Single-player

Trouballs is a 2001 Game Boy Color puzzle video game developed by Paragon Five and published by Capcom Entertainment. The game was developed out of Paragon Five's studio in Wrocław, Poland, founded and led by Paul Bragiel.

== Gameplay ==
A screenshot depicting the puzzle gameplay.

Similar in design to Tetris and Puyo Puyo, Trouballs requires players to match balls of the same color into boxes of four or six, which then disappear. Players manipulate the balls on the screen through turning wheels. Additional features include falling balls, moving winches and gears. The game has two modes: a "set number" mode with a fixed number of balls on screen, requiring the player to arrange them into rectangles until they vanish; and "ever more balls", in which balls keep falling into play and the player must prevent the screen from filling up before the time limit expires.

== Development ==
Paragon Five was founded in 1999 by Paul Bragiel, an entrepreneur and game developer from Chicago, Illinois, who had spent the mid-1990s deeply involved in the demoscene. It was through Bragiel's demoscene connections that the Wrocław team behind Trouballs was assembled. Pawel Kopinski, who served as the studio director, later described the game as the starting point of his entire career in the industry, recalling that he and several colleagues from the demoscene came together under Bragiel's Paragon 5 banner specifically to build it for the Nintendo Game Boy Color.

== Reception ==
Reception

Review scores
Publication	Score
AllGame	2.5/5
GamePro	3/5
IGN	7/10
Game Boy Xtreme	80%

Trouballs received mixed reviews upon release. On the positive side, Ian Osborne of Game Boy Xtreme called it a "fun game" and a "solid, playable puzzler", awarding it 80%. Craig Harris of IGN gave it a 7 out of 10, describing it as a "decent package with a lot of decent puzzles to complete".

Critical responses were more divided on the game's presentation and staying power. GamePro gave it three out of five, arguing that its Tetris-style backdrops and monotonous music failed to sustain engagement over longer sessions. Allgame was harsher, awarding it 2.5 out of 5 and pointing to structural frustrations — in particular the time limit forcing rushed play, and the mechanic of sending players back to the first level upon losing all lives, which the reviewer estimated could mean spending over half an hour just to advance past the second level.
