= Shovel Knight Pocket Dungeon =

2021 video game

- Developers: Vine; Yacht Club Games
- Publishers: Yacht Club Games; Netflix Games (Note: iOS and Android)
- Composer: Jake Kaufman
- Series: Shovel Knight
- Engine: GameMaker Studio
- Platforms: macOS; Nintendo Switch; PlayStation 4; Windows; Android; iOS
- Release: macOS, Switch, PS4, Windows; December 13, 2021; Android, iOS; June 6, 2023
- Genres: Puzzle, roguelike
- Modes: Single-player, multiplayer

Shovel Knight Pocket Dungeon is a roguelike puzzle game co-developed by Vine and Yacht Club Games, and published by Yacht Club Games. A spin-off of the platform game Shovel Knight, the player takes control of the namesake adventurer as he becomes trapped within a magical artifact, the Pocket Dungeon, and is forced to fight his way out while battling other knights who befell the same fate.

Gameplay is set on an 8x8 grid, on which the player can move in one of four directions. Enemies appear at the top of the grid, and the player attacks them by moving into the spaces they occupy. The contents of the grid move down the screen every time the player moves or attacks, and a game over occurs if the player loses all of their health or if the grid becomes completely filled. As players defeat the game's bosses, they unlock new playable characters with their own special abilities.

Yacht Club Games was inspired to create Pocket Dungeon after meeting with Vine, a solo developer working on a project called Puzzle Knights. Noting similarities between both games, the developers recruited Vine and helped him establish a development team. Development took place over three years on a budget of $1 million. The game was first released on December 13, 2021, for Windows, PlayStation 4, and Nintendo Switch. It received positive reviews from critics, who praised its playable characters, soundtrack, and graphics, with many highlighting the game's difficulty. Yacht Club Games supported the game with downloadable content expansions.

== Gameplay ==
A screenshot depicting the player character Shovel Knight moving across the 8x8 grid

Shovel Knight Pocket Dungeon is a roguelike puzzle game. Players take control of Shovel Knight and other playable characters as they attempt to escape the titular Pocket Dungeon. The player character is set on an 8x8 grid, on which they can move in one of four directions. Enemies spawn at the top of the grid and gradually move to the bottom. The player character attacks foes by moving into the spaces they occupy, reducing their health. Damaging enemies causes the player character to lose hit points, though this loss is avoided if their attack kills the monster. If the player character attacks an enemy that has at least one creature of the same type adjacent to it, the connected enemies take an equal amount of damage, allowing for the defeat of several foes at once. Lost hit points are restored by collecting potions that intermittently spawn alongside the monsters.

Enemies and other obstacles move down the screen every time the player moves or attacks, and continue to move at a slower rate if the player remains idle. A game over occurs if the player loses all their hit points or if the grid becomes completely filled with enemies. (Note: Optional settings can prevent a game over from losing hit points through an "infinite lives" mode, which allows the character to slowly respawn while the grid continues to fill.) Defeating monsters grants gems and fills a meter which gradually depletes over time. Adding to this gem meter allows the player to yield an increasing amount of jewels. Gems can be spent at shops in exchange for items called Relics, which provide useful effects such as more hit points.

New characters are unlocked by defeating bosses and progressing through the game, and each features its own special abilities. For example, Specter Knight has the ability to regain hit points by slaying creatures, Prism Knight teleports around the grid, and Plague Knight poisons enemies after attacking them. When the player experiences a game over, they keep a portion of their gems; kept gems can be spent to unlock new Relics that can be purchased or discovered inside levels. The game features accessibility options that are used to alter the playable character's health and attack damage and a two-person multiplayer mode where players face each other in a split-screen. In this mode, players compete to slay as many enemies as possible, and killing creatures causes the grid of the other player to quickly fill up.

== Plot ==
A mysterious cube appears at Shovel Knight's campsite. When he investigates it, he becomes trapped in a realm inside the box called the Pocket Dungeon. There, he meets a man named Puzzle Knight, who has remained inside the cube for many years. He tells Shovel Knight that the only way to escape the Pocket Dungeon is to traverse the realm and defeat a being called the Pocket Dungeon Master. Later on, Puzzle Knight informs Shovel Knight of a magical key that was broken into four parts, asking him to collect its missing fragments. While journeying through the dungeon, Shovel Knight encounters other knights who became trapped, defeating and recruiting them to his side. On the final level, Puzzle Knight reveals himself to be the Pocket Dungeon Master; he sent the knights on a quest to find him to identify a powerful warrior who could act as his replacement, allowing him to escape. The chosen playable character defeats Puzzle Knight, escaping the Pocket Dungeon alone.

By collecting the four key fragments, the player experiences the true ending. After the battle with Puzzle Knight, a warrior named Prism Knight appears and informs him of the key's completion, and Puzzle Knight uses it to unlock a secret level called the Tower of Fate. Inside, the three knights meet the Enchantress, who reveals that Prism Knight was responsible for trapping Shovel Knight and the other playable characters inside the dungeon; the Enchantress had manipulated her into using her powers to lure knights to the cube, claiming that doing so would allow her to locate her missing father. The Enchantress plans to dominate the world while the knights are imprisoned, and turns Puzzle Knight into a monster to ensure they remain trapped. The chosen character defeats the monster and reverts Puzzle Knight to his original form. The Pocket Dungeon collapses, and all the knights escape. In a post-credits scene, Puzzle Knight is revealed to be Prism Knight's father, relating in a conversation that he first became trapped in the dungeon while searching for an heirloom. He gives Prism Knight this artifact, a magic telescope that causes a shooting star to appear in the sky.

== Development and release ==
Shovel Knight Pocket Dungeon is a spin-off of Shovel Knight. After Yacht Club Games had finished developing Shovel Knight: Treasure Trove, an employee found a solo developer called Vine while on Twitter, discovering a roguelike puzzle game the developer worked on called Puzzle Knights. Interested in both game genres and finding similarities between both games, Yacht Club Games contacted Vine and helped him assemble a team of developers. The game was created over the course of three years, with Yacht Club Games and Vine splitting its $1 million budget equally.

The soundtrack was composed by Jake Kaufman, who had done the same with previous Shovel Knight titles. Shovel Knight Pocket Dungeon was first released for Windows, macOS, Nintendo Switch, and PlayStation 4 on December 13, 2021. After release, Yacht Club Games launched a free update to the game containing accessibility controls and announced three downloadable content (DLC) expansions. Ports to iOS and Android were published by Netflix Games and launched on June 6, 2023, alongside the first DLC, Puzzler Pack. The Puzzler Pack adds playable characters, unlockable Relics, and new locations. Another DLC expansion called Paradox Pack was released on August 13, 2024, adding new playable characters, bosses, and levels.

== Reception ==
Reception

Aggregate scores
Aggregator	Score
Metacritic	84/100 (PC); 83/100 (Switch); 80/100 (PS4)
OpenCritic	93% recommend

Review scores
Publication	Score
GameSpot	8/10
Hardcore Gamer	4.5/5
IGN	8/10
Nintendo Life	9/10
Nintendo World Report	9/10
NME	4/5
Shacknews	9/10
Siliconera	8/10
Paste	9/10

According to the review aggregator website Metacritic, Shovel Knight Pocket Dungeon received "generally favorable reviews" for its PC, Nintendo Switch, and PlayStation 4 versions. On OpenCritic, it received a 93% approval rating.

Critics praised the game's combination of puzzle and roguelike mechanics. Eurogamer called its gameplay innovative and smart, while IGN was impressed in how the developers had combined the dissimilar roguelike and puzzle genres. Nintendo Life found Pocket Dungeon to be well-designed and fun, saying that it was a worthy entry into the franchise.

Critics found Shovel Knight Pocket Dungeon fast-paced and difficult. Shacknews felt that the game was not a casual experience and said that the difficulty rapidly increased. NME said that the pace of each level could feel overwhelming but considered the difficulty manageable after the player learned each of the mechanics. Nintendo Life found the difficulty to be punishing when the player made minor mistakes but contended that the game remained fair despite the frequency of player death. The accessibility options were positively received. Hardcore Gamer felt that these settings gave the player options to adjust the gameplay. Although NME said that they made game easier to play, the reviewer found the lack of support for colorblindness disappointing.

The soundtrack was highlighted. Nintendo Life called the music similar in quality to Kaufman's earlier work, and NME said that they fit the tone and pace of the levels. The reviewer for Paste related that they would sometimes restart the game just to hear the first level's song again. Other critics liked the visuals. Nintendo World Report considered them visually pleasing and distinct from the rest of the franchise, and Paste found the character designs in particular to be charming and neat.

Reviewers widely praised the playable characters. Eurogamer said that they were one of the main appeals of the game and were well-designed, highlighting Specter Knight in particular. GameSpot felt that their abilities altered how the game could be played and liked defeating each of the bosses in order to unlock them. Nintendo Life thought that the characters offered significant replayability to the game, and Paste felt that they added depth. However, the reviewer felt that some of the knights were better than others, and made the original Shovel Knight character feel boring by comparison.
