= Vitamin Connection =

2020 video game

- Developer: WayForward
- Publisher: WayForward
- Director: James Montagna
- Producers: John Eric Hart; Joel Youkhanna
- Designer: Alex Dupré
- Programmers: John Eric Hart; Jimmy Hart; James Guintu
- Artists: Lindsay Collins; Anna Angrick; David Nevers
- Writers: James Montagna; Elliot Trinidad; Tomm Hulett; Tommy Pedrini
- Composers: Tommy Pedrini; Maddie Lim; Chiyoko Yamasato; Jake Kaufman; Julian Sanchez; Jesse Martin
- Engine: EngineBlack
- Platform: Nintendo Switch
- Release: February 20, 2020
- Genre: Action-adventure
- Modes: Single-player, multiplayer

Vitamin Connection is a 2020 action-adventure game developed and published by WayForward, exclusively for Nintendo Switch. It was released on February 20, 2020, to positive critical reception. Limited Run Games distributed limited physical versions of the title.

== Gameplay ==
Players take control of one of two characters, Vita-Boy and Mina-Girl, who use the microscopic Capsule Ship to fight off viruses and other enemies hosted within the Sable family, which makes them ill. The ship itself is controlled with an individual Joy-Con and motion controls, which are used to control the ship and execute attacks. Main levels are navigated using the tilt controls of the Switch. Various "sub-games" are also present throughout the adventure.

== Development ==
The game was announced on August 13, 2019 in a press release by WayForward. The title was always intended to be a Switch exclusive, with the team stating they were impressed by the system's hardware upon receiving a development kit and wanted to create a game tailored towards the console's unorthodox capabilities. Development officially started in 2017, but funding difficulties stalled progression on the title and for a period forced the team to work on other internal projects. The game was heavily inspired by Jet Set Radio and the Katamari series, specifically with respect to their focus on a creativity, a distinct artstyle and the emphasis the games place on their soundtracks.

== Release ==
Vitamin Connection got its first trailer in January, 2020, and was announced to have a release date of February 20, 2020 as a downloadable title on the Nintendo eShop. The game received a limited physical release by Limited Run Games alongside Mighty Switch Force! Collection, and Mystik Belle for a "WayForward Day." Standard editions went up for a two-week pre-order period beginning on January 17, while a collector's edition was limited to 2,000 copies.

== Reception ==
Reception

Aggregate score
Aggregator	Score
Metacritic	(NS) 80/100

Review scores
Publication	Score
Nintendo Life	7/10
Nintendo World Report	9/10

Vitamin Connection was generally well received by critics. Review aggregator website Metacritic gave the game 80/100, based on ten reviews.

Nintendo World Report gave the game a 9/10, praising its gameplay, content and style, though did offer some criticism towards the backtracking the game featured. Jon Mundy of Nintendo Life gave the game an overall positive review, praising the visuals, co-op gameplay and the variety that the game offers. However, he mentioned some criticism regarding the controls and the game's frequent use of backtracking.
