= Shovel Knight: Specter of Torment =

2017 video game expansion

- Developer: Yacht Club Games
- Publisher: Yacht Club Games
- Composer: Jake Kaufman
- Platforms: Nintendo Switch: Linux; macOS; Windows; Wii U; Nintendo 3DS; PlayStation 3; PlayStation 4; PlayStation Vita; Xbox One
- Release: Nintendo Switch; March 3, 2017; Linux, macOS, Windows; April 5, 2017; Wii U; April 21, 2017; PlayStation 3, PlayStation 4, PlayStation Vita, 3DS, Xbox One; April 25, 2017
- Genre: Platform
- Mode: Single-player

Shovel Knight: Specter of Torment is a 2017 expansion for the 2014 platform game Shovel Knight, developed and published by Yacht Club Games. The player controls Specter Knight, an undead warrior tasked with recruiting a group of knights for the Enchantress, the main villain of Shovel Knight. Specter Knight can run up walls and jump off them, and slash through enemies and objects with his scythe to move through the air. Specter Knight can obtain red skulls hidden inside levels, which can be traded for Curios, objects that grant special abilities. Gameplay in Specter of Torment is similar to Shovel Knight, but features new levels and redesigned boss fights.

Yacht Club Games developed Specter of Torment after finishing production of the previous DLC, Shovel Knight: Plague of Shadows. They created new levels based on the stages from the original Shovel Knight, and spent four months revisiting and balancing each completed level. The team designed Specter Knight to be an easily controllable character after receiving feedback that the movement of Plague Knight, the protagonist of Plague of Shadows, was too complex. Upon release, Specter of Torment received generally favorable reviews from critics, who praised the platforming gameplay, narrative, level design, and Specter Knight's moveset, though some considered the game too short.

== Gameplay ==
Specter Knight jumps across platforms to collect a red skull, which is used to purchase special weapons and abilities.

Like Shovel Knight, Specter of Torment is a 2D side-scrolling platform game. Players control Specter Knight, an undead warrior serving the evil Enchantress. Specter Knight features a different moveset than the protagonist of Shovel Knight: he can run up walls, jump off them, and attack enemies with his scythe. Slashing an enemy or object with the scythe allows him to move forward through the air, upward or downward.

Specter of Torment features redesigned boss fights and new levels based on those from the original Shovel Knight. These stages are accessed from a hub world instead of a large map. As with Shovel Knight, players can destroy checkpoints to receive a reward, but will be unable to respawn at that location if they die before reaching the next checkpoint.

Hidden inside levels are red skulls, which can be traded at a vendor in the hub world for special weapons and abilities called Curios. Curios serve a similar role to Relics in Shovel Knight, and are powered using a resource called darkness that is recharged by slaying enemies. Examples of Curios include the "Green Skull" for regaining health, "Judgment Rush" for teleporting through walls, and "Hover Plume" for temporarily floating in mid-air. Progressing through the game allows the player to learn Specter Knight's true identity and how he came to serve the Enchantress.

== Plot ==
Specter of Torment is a prequel to Shovel Knight. At the Tower of Fate, the Enchantress, the main antagonist of Shovel Knight, instructs her undead servant Specter Knight to defeat eight knights and force them to join her Order of No Quarter. In Specter Knight's possession is a magic locket, which grows in power as he recruits the knights. Once all are defeated, its magic will resurrect him as a living creature. As Specter Knight defeats his adversaries and forces them to serve the Enchantress, he recalls memories of his former life: before dying, he was an adventurer named Donovan, who explored alongside his partner, Luan. The two scaled the Tower of Fate in search of a magical amulet to give to Luan's son. Once at the top, they ran into Shovel Knight's partner Shield Knight, who warned them that the amulet was cursed. Donovan fought Shield Knight against Luan's wishes, causing the floor beneath them to collapse, killing Luan. Shield Knight, having transformed into the Enchantress due to the amulet's corruption, offered to save a mortally wounded Donovan in exchange for servitude. Unaware that the Enchantress was Shield Knight, he accepted the offer and was transformed into Specter Knight.

After Specter Knight assembles four of the knights, a boy named Reize breaks into the Tower of Fate hoping to defeat the evil within. Seeing his potential, the Enchantress fills him with dark energy, corrupting him despite Specter Knight's protests. Once seven knights are recruited, Specter Knight's friend Black Knight breaks in and reveals that the Enchantress is Shield Knight. Enraged that he was working for his enemy, Specter Knight pursues the Enchantress to her private sanctum. Upon his arrival, the Enchantress summons Reize and fills him with more dark energy, turning him into a powerful monster. Specter Knight defeats Reize, and the Enchantress agrees to grant the locket its remaining power. When she discloses her intention to appoint Reize as the eighth knight, Specter Knight abruptly promises to be the last knight in Reize's place, heals the boy with the locket, and returns him to his village. Now bound to serving the Enchantress for eternity, Specter Knight laments to Black Knight that the Order of No Quarter is unstoppable. In a post-credits scene, Specter Knight reminisces over the locket, which is a keepsake given to him by Luan. In a final memory, it is shown that Luan asked Donovan to protect his son, Reize.

== Development ==
As part of the crowdfunding campaign for Shovel Knight on Kickstarter in 2013, Yacht Club Games listed several stretch goals, additional game features added when funding met a certain target. Among the stretch goals were the addition of three playable characters based around the bosses from the original game. The developers held a vote on which bosses would become playable, and Specter Knight was one of the winning characters. Yacht Club Games later decided to increase the scale of their plans and give each of the playable knights their own game.

Development of Specter of Torment began after Yacht Club Games finished production of the previous expansion, Shovel Knight: Plague of Shadows. The developers hoped to make a more ambitious experience than Plague of Shadows, which featured a character with unique movement, but the same levels as the original game. The team felt that the movement of Plague of Shadows made the levels of Shovel Knight interesting to play again, but surmised that playing through the stages again in a third expansion would be repetitive even if they altered the player's mobility. Yacht Club Games decided to redesign all of the stages while using the originals as blueprints. The final product was intended to be an equal combination of new and reused content, but ended up composed mostly of new features. As Specter of Torment was the third overall campaign in the series, the team desired to innovate on many of the mechanics present in the two previous games.

=== Character design ===
Yacht Club Games wanted to create a darker story centered around Specter Knight, a boss character from the original game that they intended to be "tragic but awesome". The developers designed Specter Knight's mobility after receiving feedback on the movement in Plague of Shadows. Some players of Plague of Shadows had complained that the movement of its protagonist, Plague Knight, was too chaotic, so Yacht Club Games simplified the controls for Specter Knight. The team dropped the flying movement used in Specter Knight's boss battle in the original game after finding it incompatible with the platforming.

The wall jumping was inspired by 3D action games such as Prince of Persia, while the slashing movement was influenced by The Legend of Zelda: Ocarina of Time and Ninja Gaiden Black. The developers wanted Specter Knight to act like a "grim reaper ninja", at one point included shurikens as part of his attack repertoire. Difficulties with teaching players how to use the slashing movement led to Yacht Club adding a UI element on objects that could be slashed, which indicates whether the player would move upward or downward by attacking these objects from a certain angle. They further allowed Specter Knight to fall slower to give players more time to recognize the direction that they would move in by slashing. The Curios were originally designed to be earned by defeating enemies; the player could only use one at a time, and each Curio would be lost upon death. Believing that this system made Curios feel like power-ups rather than new abilities, the developers allowed them to be permanently accessible through an inventory similar to the original Shovel Knight's. Some of Specter Knight's boss abilities were recreated as Curios, and others were designed to address specific level challenges such as invulnerable enemies or difficult platforming.

=== Level design ===
The levels took nearly a year to complete. Yacht Club Games felt that Specter Knight's increased mobility would require different level layouts. Early in development, the team added more spacing and walls inside their new stages to ensure the player could move properly. This spacing was a constant concern, as developers did not always know what platforming movements the player would take to progress. They recounted that "10 percent of our design process involves thinking up fun scenarios, and about 90 percent involves wrangling with the spacing requirements".

The team planned for each level to feature approximately 26 rooms and 6 secret areas; this room count was based on a design formula taken from the Mega Man franchise. They wanted a consistent balance between platforming, combat, and exploration, and occasionally planned for each room to be centered around an individual theme, such as platforming or puzzles. The rooms and enemies were often revised or rearranged, and the team would sometimes consider their plans excessive, abandoning them to focus on creating basic platforming sections. Each stage was intended to start simple and become more complex and challenging over time, before reverting to the earlier difficulty. Yacht Club Games felt that the gameplay concepts should be "introduced, extrapolated upon, shuffled away, and revisited", and that players could be challenged if all the mechanics were combined at the end of the level.

The developers, after playing the game so much themselves, found it tricky to balance the difficulty. They decided late in development they had made the levels too hard, and gradually reduced their challenge before release. Because players could use the hub to access all of the available stages, unlike the previous two games where they could only be completed in a certain order, the team redesigned the easier levels of Shovel Knight and Plague of Shadows to be more difficult, while reducing the challenge of the harder ones.

The game includes enemies and objects that were taken from previously cut concepts. The developers considered Plague of Shadows and Shovel Knight too similar visually, saying that the comparable graphics made it hard to communicate that they were separate games. As a result, the team created new tiles to give Specter of Torment a unique artistic design. They used background art to convey information about gameplay mechanics, indicate secret rooms, and further the narrative. The Nintendo 3DS version includes backgrounds with more depth perception, and allows for the viewing of art that is not visible in other ports of the game. The soundtrack was composed by Jake Kaufman, who created most of it while streaming on Twitch. The soundtrack features remixes of previous music from the series, as well as several new songs.

== Release and reception ==
Reception

Aggregate scores
Aggregator	Score
Metacritic	Switch: 84/100
OpenCritic	97%

Review scores
Publication	Score
4Players	84%
Destructoid	9.5/10
GameRevolution	8/10
GameSpot	8/10
Nintendo Life	9/10
Nintendo World Report	9/10
Shacknews	8/10
USgamer	4.0/5

Specter of Torment was announced on December 1, 2016, at The Game Awards, and was first released for Nintendo Switch as a launch title on March 3, 2017. The expansion is sold as a standalone game but is also available as part of the compilation Shovel Knight: Treasure Trove. The game was also released for Linux, macOS, and Windows one month later on April 5. A version for the Wii U was first released on April 21, and ports for PlayStation 3, PlayStation 4, PlayStation Vita, Nintendo 3DS, and Xbox One were released on April 25.

According to the review aggregator website Metacritic, Specter of Torment received "generally favorable reviews" for its Nintendo Switch version. Critics called Specter of Torment a worthy entry in the Shovel Knight series, and felt that it built upon the merits of the original game. GameSpot said that Specter of Torment replicated the mechanics that made Shovel Knight excellent, while USgamer felt that it was of similar quality to both of its predecessors. Shacknews felt that Specter of Torment was more appealing than Shovel Knight, and called it a "modernized version of the platforming games that we loved and loved to hate from childhood."

Reviewers praised Specter Knight's moveset. GameRevolution likened the moveset to that of a Super Smash Bros. character, saying that it was fun and helped distinguish the game from its predecessors. USgamer felt that the controls and moveset helped create a unique and aggressive style of gameplay. GameSpot contended that the simple controls made Specter Knight feel powerful and fun.

The platforming received similar praise. Nintendo Life said that the game's platforming was comparable to its predecessors, and wrote that it felt "satisfying in a way that few games manage in this day and age." GameSpot considered the platforming challenging, highlighting how Specter Knight would have to input several moves together to progress and contended that the difficulty helped make gameplay feel rewarding. GameRevolution felt that the platforming was difficult to understand because it relied upon complicated movement, and was overall inferior to the original Shovel Knight's. The level design was positively received. GameRevolution and Nintendo Life found the levels similar to that of the original game, but liked the content additions and how the stages accommodated Specter Knight's movement. Nintendo World Report wrote that the game provided a new experience by redesigning old mechanics, and GameSpot called the new levels familiar but memorable due to their mechanical changes.

The story was considered a highlight. Nintendo World Report liked the narrative and called it "surprisingly tragic", while Shacknews felt that the story helped make Specter Knight a complex character. Destructoid said that it was the best story in the series, despite its short length, and demonstrated how Yacht Club Games had improved its writing. GameRevolution felt that the narrative held more weight than Plague of Shadows, but that the quality of the writing was uneven. Critics gave attention to the boss fights. GameSpot called the redesigned bosses an "enjoyable surprise" and thought that some of the bosses were too similar. USgamer considered the bosses easier than in previous games, while Nintendo World Report said that some of them were frustrating. Other reviewers found the game too short. Shacknews said that some players would dislike the narrow focus on platforming gameplay, while Nintendo Life called the DLC "short but sweet". The reviewer for Nintendo Life said that the game was another entry in a great franchise, and was just as excellent as the original Shovel Knight.
