= Paul Bragiel =

American businessman

- Born: 15 September 1977 (age 48)
- Citizenship: American, Polish, Colombian
- Scientific career
- Fields: Computer Engineer and Business

Paul Bragiel (born 15 September 1977 in Chicago, Illinois) is an internet entrepreneur and currently a managing partner of Bragiel Brothers.

== Early life ==
Bragiel, the oldest child of Mary and Walter Bragiel, was raised in Mt. Prospect and South Barrington, Illinois. In the late 1990s, he was involved in the demoscene.

== Ventures ==
Bragiel graduated from University of Illinois in 1999. Shortly after graduating he founded his first company, Paragon 5, with offices in Chicago and Poland. In 2004, he founded the first location-based social network, Meetro. In 2008, he founded Lefora, which was sold to Crowdgather in the summer of 2010.

In 2010, he launched i/o Ventures, a seed fund and accelerator based in San Francisco.

In 2012, he launched three more technology-focused seed funds. Savannah Fund (Sub-Saharan Africa) and Golden Gate Ventures (Southeast Asia) were created to foster entrepreneurship in those regions. Gamefounders (Eastern Europe) invests in companies building gaming-related products.

In 2014, Paul launched Sisu Game Ventures, a $50m global early-stage venture fund investing in games.

In 2015, he launched Presence Capital, a $10m venture fund investing in early-stage virtual reality (VR) and augmented reality (AR) companies.

In 2019, he launched SMOK Ventures, a $50m venture fund investing in early-stage companies in Central & Eastern Europe.

In 2021, Paul launched Niu Ventures, a $10m venture fund investing in early-stage companies in Brazil.

He travels around the world to give lectures on startups and is an advisor to governments on their technology and entrepreneurship policy including Philippines, Singapore, Brazil and Tanzania.

== Olympics ==
In 2013, Bragiel trained in cross-country skiing in Finland with a view to competing in the 2014 Sochi Olympics under the Colombian flag. In order to participate, Bragiel obtained Colombian citizenship by presidential decree and was soon globally addressed as the man who was hacking his way into the Olympics.

For the 2016 Summer Olympics, Bragiel joined the Tonga delegation as team attaché.

During the 2018 Winter Olympics, Bragiel served as a coach for both the Colombia and Tonga cross-country ski teams. He is noted as being the first person to participate in the Opening and Closing Ceremonies for two different countries in the same Olympics.

== Baseball ==
In April 2024, Paul was announced as a bench coach for the Poland national baseball team, joining manager Dennis Cook and coach John McLaren.

== Youtube ==
"Premature Baldness", uploaded on April 29, 2005 by user "Paul", is the fourth oldest video on YouTube and holds several significant distinctions in the platform's history.

Notably, it marks the first edited video on YouTube. Other milestones include the first video featuring copyrighted music and the first video to surpass one minute in duration.
