= Jake Kaufman =

American video game music composer (born 1981)

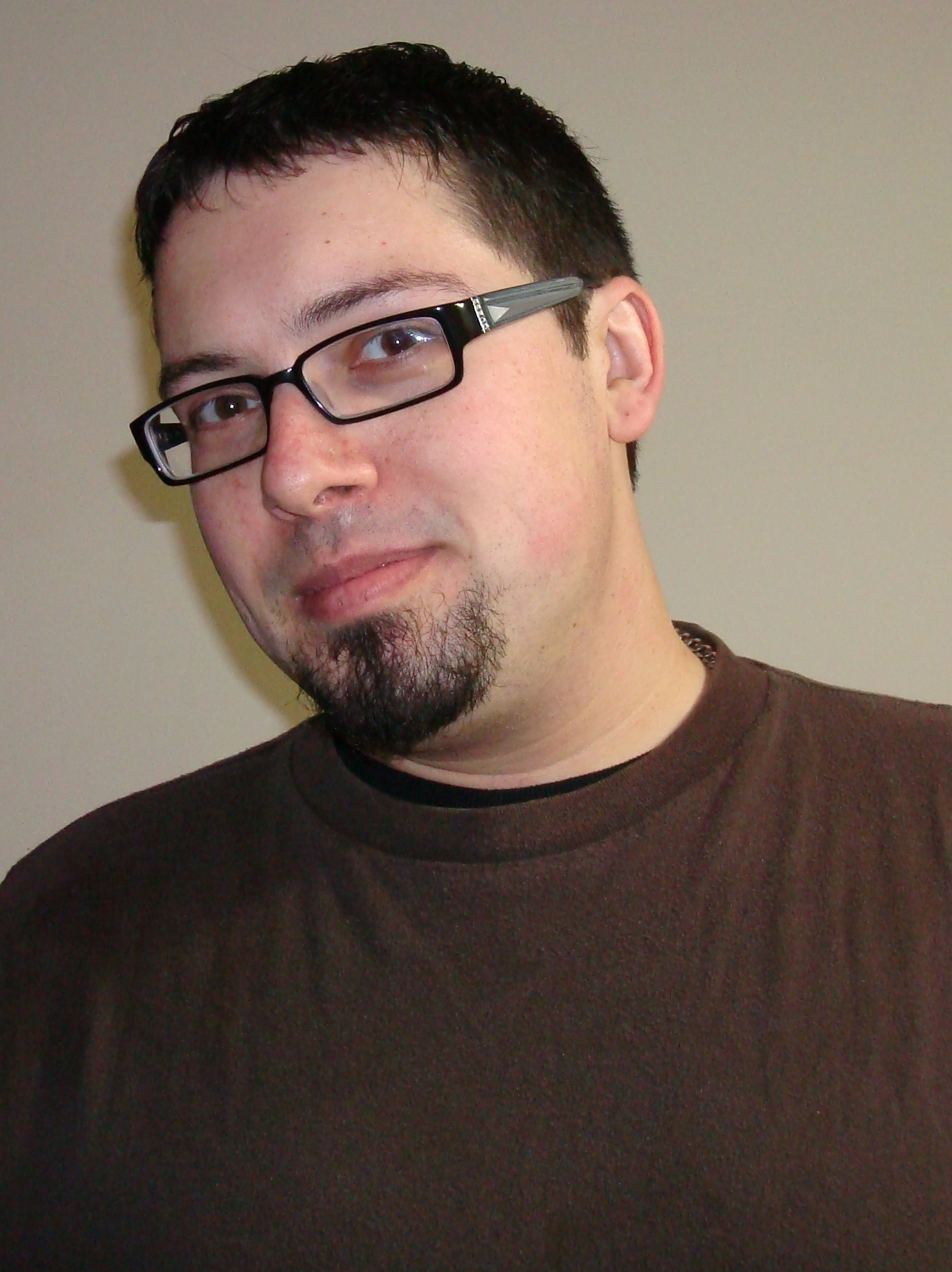
- Kaufman in 2009

Background information
- Also known as: virt virtjk
- Genres: Video game music, chiptune
- Occupations: Composer, sound designer
- Years active: 2000–present
- Labels: Big Lion Music; Mint Potion

Jake Kaufman (born 1981; also known as virt or virtjk) is an American video game music composer. After starting out creating arrangements and remixes of video game soundtracks, he began his commercial composing career in 2000 with the score to the Game Boy Color port of Q*bert. He continued to compose music for games for the next couple of years, working primarily with handheld video games. In 2002, he set up the website VGMix, which hosted video game music remixes. His career began to take off over the next few years, resulting in him transitioning jobs into a full-time freelance composer by 2005. Since then he has worked on several big-name projects such as the Shantae series, Contra 4, Red Faction: Guerrilla, DuckTales: Remastered, Shovel Knight, and Crypt of the Necrodancer.

== Biography ==
Kaufman dropped out of high school with what he describes as "a total lack of work ethic and no concept of timeliness or organization." He spent the next few years composing arrangements and remixes of video game music under the alias "virt". In 2000, Kaufman broke into the video game industry as a composer, with his first work being the Game Boy Color port of Q*bert. Over the next few years, he composed the music to several Game Boy Color and Game Boy Advance games. In 2002, Kaufman was one of the co-founders of the website VGMix, which hosted video game music remixes.

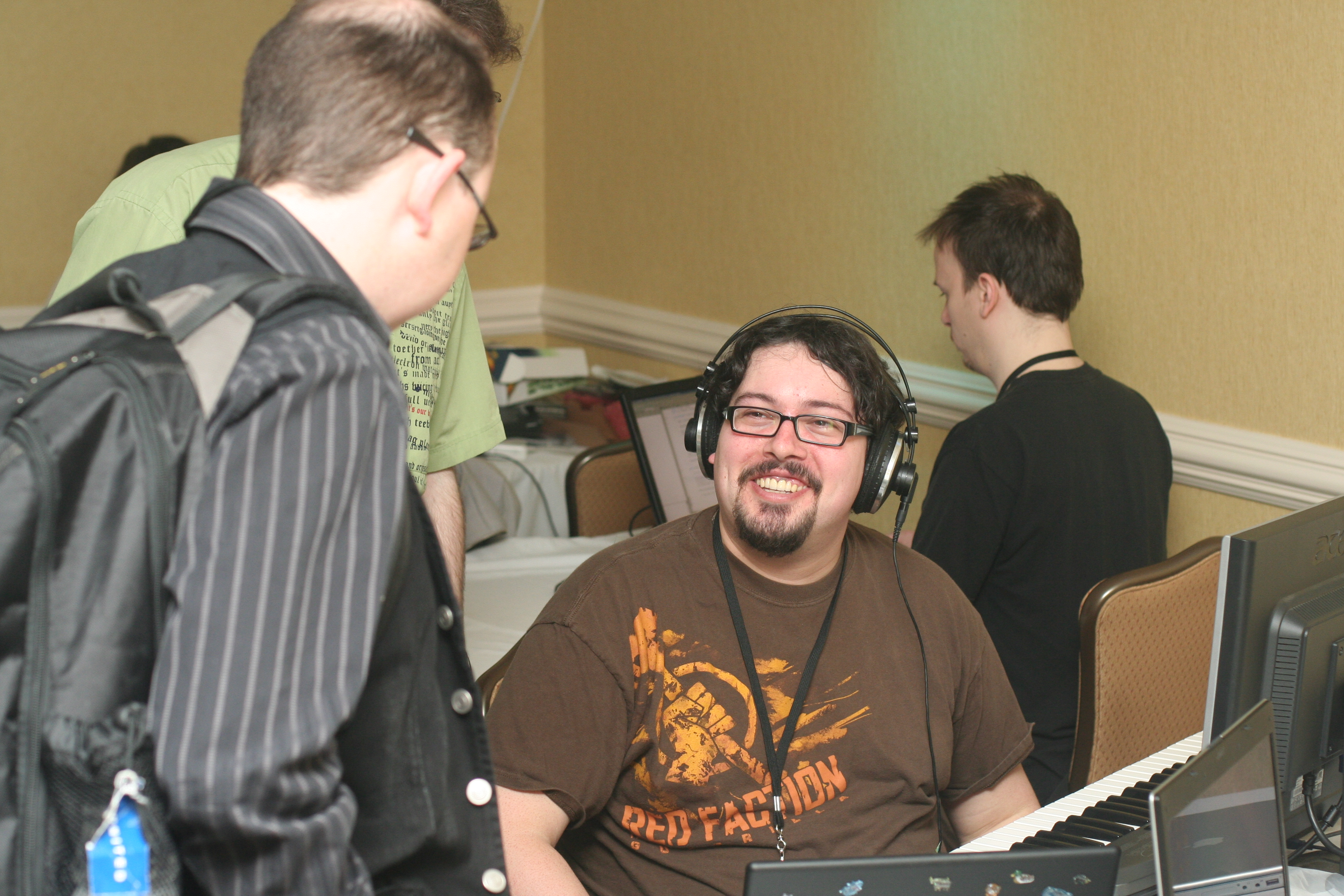
Kaufman at Notacon in 2009

During 2002–2005, Kaufman's career as a video game music composer began to take off. By 2005, he was a full-time freelance video game composer. He continued to compose music to increasingly big-name projects, such as Contra 4 and TMNT in 2007 and Red Faction: Guerrilla in 2009; he described composing the soundtrack to a Contra game and a Teenage Mutant Ninja Turtles game as his "lifelong dream". Kaufman contributed a track to the official arranged album of music from Ketsui: Kizuna Jigoku Tachi. He was a full-time employee of Volition while working on Red Faction, but in January 2010, he left the company to become the "lead audio guy" for WayForward, for which he had already composed several soundtracks such as those of Shantae and Contra 4. For WayForward he first composed the soundtrack to Shantae: Risky's Revenge, the sequel to the game he worked on ten years prior. Original Sound Version named Kaufman their Composer of the Year for 2011, based on his work on BloodRayne: Betrayal and Mighty Switch Force, as well as several other soundtracks and arranged albums. Kaufman lives with his puggle Nugget in northern Los Angeles.

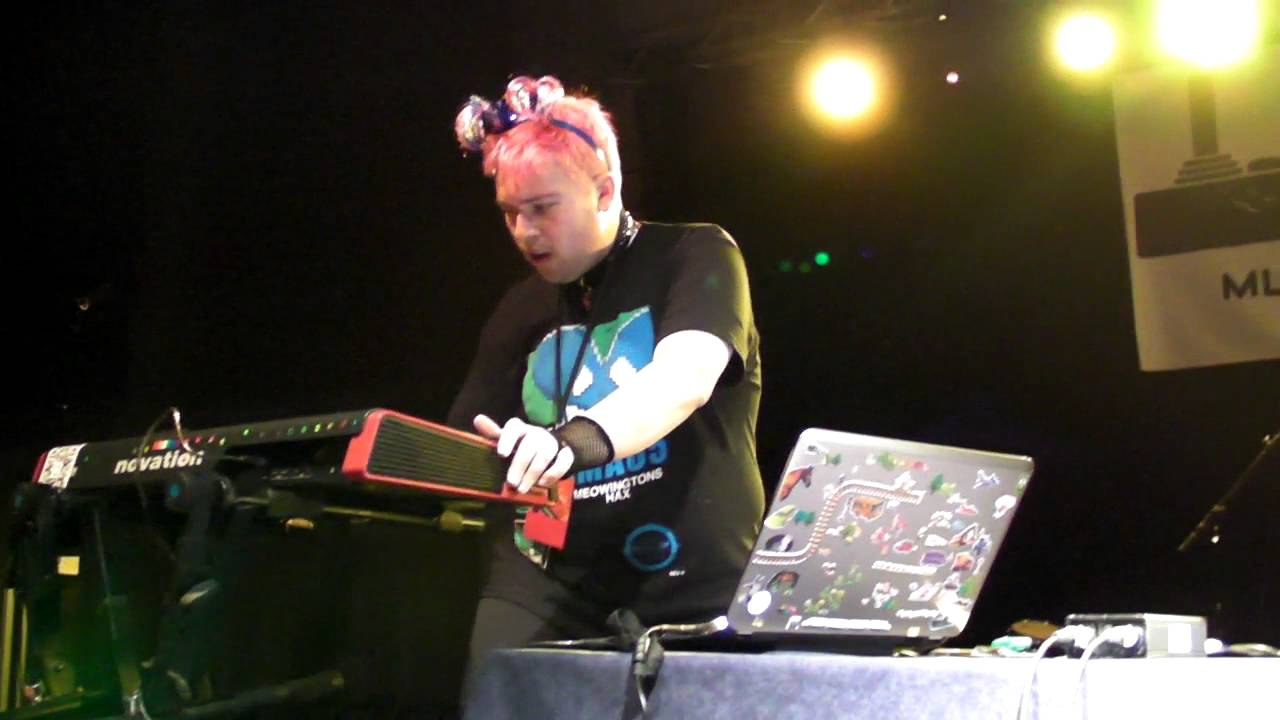
Jake Kaufman performing at MAGFest 10 in 2012

While working at WayForward, Kaufman composed music for the Shantae series, the BloodRayne series, and nearly a dozen other games. During this time he also composed music for independent games such as Shovel Knight. On November 1, 2014, Kaufman announced that he was leaving WayForward on mutual terms to work as a freelance composer and sound designer from his own studio, in order to be able to set his own schedule and choose his own projects. The last games which he worked full-time for the company were Teenage Mutant Ninja Turtles: Danger of the Ooze and Shantae: Half-Genie Hero, the latter being composed between 2013 and 2015 but only released in late 2016.

In February 2015, Kaufman collaborated with Jessie Seely, a video game vocalist and professional artist, to launch the Kickstarter campaign of [NUREN] The New Renaissance. [NUREN] was self-described as "the world's first virtual reality rock opera." The project was planned to be a full-length music album, accompanied by music videos that users would experience using a head-mounted display such as the Oculus Rift. The proposed music and videos were set in a post-war future society where androids cater to humanity's needs; two prototype androids named QGK and RIX were planned as the main subjects of the project. In March 2015, the project was successfully funded with $76,950 raised. The project was slated to arrive to Kickstarter backers in February 2016. In August 2016, Kaufman cited "contracting work" and a "ridiculous client workload" as obstacles to completing [NUREN], and as of 2025 it has yet to be released.

In March 2016, Kaufman and recording engineer Robert Altschuler founded their own music label called Mint Potion, based in Santa Clarita, California. It provides music and audio services for a variety of productions, most notably the background music and theme songs for the TV shows OK K.O.! Let's Be Heroes and Mao Mao: Heroes of Pure Heart. Through Mint Potion, Kaufman briefly worked again with WayForward as a freelance composer on the games Cat Girl Without Salad: Amuse-Bouche and Vitamin Connection, as well as continued composing for the various Shovel Knight DLCs. Other composers such as Chiyoko Yamasato and Tommy Pedrini have since joined the label.

== Works ==
=== Video games ===
Year	Game	Notes	Ref.
2000	Q*bert	Music	
2000	Drymouth	Music	
2000	M&M's Minis Madness	Music	
2001	Tennis Masters Series	Music	
2001	David Beckham Soccer	Music	
2001	Who Wants to Be a Millionaire?	Arrangements of Keith and Matthew Strachan's soundtrack; Game Boy Color version	
2001	Atlantis: The Lost Empire	Music	
2001	X-Bladez: Inline Skater	Music	
2002	The Scorpion King: Sword of Osiris	Music	
2002	Karnaaj Rally	Music	
2002	Godzilla: Domination	Music	
2002	Shantae	Music	
2002	Micro Machines	Music	
2002	Hardcore Pinball	Music	
2002	Rugrats: I Gotta Go Party	Music	
2004	Barbie as the Princess and the Pauper	Music	
2005	Spy Hunter / Super Sprint	Music	
2005	Legend of Kay	Music	
2005	Rebelstar: Tactical Command	Music	
2005	Berenstain Bears and the Spooky Old Tree	Music	
2006	Miami Nights: Singles in the City	Music	
2006	Ibiza Beach Party	Music	
2007	Shrek: Ogres & Dronkeys	Music	
2007	Contra 4	Music	
2007	Petz: Catz 2	Music	
2007	Elements of Destruction	Music with Chad Seiter	
2007	TMNT	Music; Nintendo DS version	
2007	Surf's Up	Music; Nintendo DS and GBA versions	
2007	Cranium Kabookii	Music	
2008	Imagine: My Secret World	Music	
2008	Winx Club: Mission Enchantix	Music	
2008	Pokermillion 2009: The Bluff	Music	
2008	Ben 10: All Out Attack!	Music	
2009	Mighty Flip Champs!	Music	
2009	Red Faction: Guerilla	Music with Timothy Michael Wynn and others	
2009	Barbie and the Three Musketeers	Music; DS, Wii and PC versions	
2009	Virtual Villagers: Erschaffe dein Paradies!	Music	
2010	Despicable Me: The Game - Minion Mayhem	Music	
2010	Shantae: Risky's Revenge	Music	
2010	Batman: The Brave and the Bold – The Videogame	Music with Kristopher Carter, Michael McCuistion, and Lolita Ritmanis	
2011	Thor: God of Thunder	Music; Nintendo DS version	
2011	SpongeBob SquigglePants	Music	
2011	Mighty Milky Way	Music	
2011	BloodRayne: Betrayal	Music	
2011	Mighty Switch Force!	Music	
2011	Centipede: Infestation	Music	
2011	Otomedius Excellent	Music; downloadable content addition	
2011	DoDonPachi DaiFukkatsu	Black Label Arrange version	
2012	Retro City Rampage	Music with Leonard J. Paul and Matthew Creamer	
2012	Darkstalkers Resurrection	Music	
2012	Hotel Transylvania	Music	
2012	Double Dragon Neon	Music	
2012	Adventure Time: Hey Ice King! Why'd You Steal Our Garbage?!!	Music	
2013	Mighty Switch Force! 2	Music	
2013	Regular Show: Mordecai and Rigby in 8-Bit Land	Music	
2013	Ultionus: A Tale of Petty Revenge	Music	
2013	Adventure Time: Explore the Dungeon Because I Don't Know!	Music with Ian Stocker	
2013	DuckTales: Remastered	Original music and arrangements of Hiroshige Tonomura's soundtrack	
2014	Shovel Knight	Music	
2014	Wonder Momo: Typhoon Booster	Music with Alex Culang	
2014	Boot Hill Heroes	Music	
2014	Shantae and the Pirate's Curse	Music	
2014	Teenage Mutant Ninja Turtles: Danger of the Ooze	Music	
2015	Adventures of Pip	Music	
2015	Supreme League of Patriots	Music	
2015	Mighty Switch Force! Hose It Down!	Music	
2015	Legend of Kay Anniversary	Music	
2015	Vanguard V	Main theme	
2016	Crypt of the Necrodancer	Alternate soundtrack	
2016	Pulsar Arena	Music	
2016	Shantae: Half-Genie Hero	Music	
2016	Cat Girl Without Salad: Amuse-Bouche	Music	
2020	Ray’s the Dead	Music with various others	
2020	Boot Hill Bounties	Music with various others	
2020	Vitamin Connection	Music	
2021	Shovel Knight Pocket Dungeon	Music	
2022	Shovel Knight Dig	Music	
2024	Teenage Mutant Ninja Turtles: Shredder's Revenge	Arrangement of "It Won't Fly!"	
2026	Mina the Hollower	Music with Yuzo Koshiro	
2026	Tanuki: Pon's Summer	Music with various others	

=== Film ===
Year	Title	Director	Notes
2007	Press Start	Ed Glaser	
2009	Rampage	Çetin Inanç	English dub

=== Television ===
Year	Title	Notes
2017–2019	OK K.O.! Let's Be Heroes	as Mint Potion Studios
2019–2020	Mao Mao: Heroes of Pure Heart	as Mint Potion Studios

=== Web ===
==== Pilots ====
Year	Title	Notes	Ref.
2026	Gameoverse	Composer; with Grant Kirkhope	
