= List of music video games =

This is a list of music video games, sorted alphabetically. The table can be sorted by a different column via clicking on the small box next to column heading.

== Legend ==
Video game platforms
3DS	Nintendo 3DS, 3DS Virtual Console, iQue 3DS	Arcade	Arcade video game	DC	Dreamcast
DROID	Android	DS	Nintendo DS, DSiWare, iQue DS	GBA	Game Boy Advance, iQue GBA
iOS	iOS, iPhone, iPod, iPadOS, iPad, visionOS, Apple Vision Pro	LIN	Linux, SteamOS	MAC	Classic Mac OS, 2001 and before
MOBI	Mobile phone	NS	Nintendo Switch	OS2	OS/2
OSX	macOS	PS1	PlayStation 1	PS2	PlayStation 2
PS3	PlayStation 3	PS4	PlayStation 4	PS5	PlayStation 5
PSN	PlayStation Network	PSP	PlayStation Portable	PSV	PlayStation Vita
Quest	Meta Quest / Oculus Quest family, including Oculus Rift	SAT	Sega Saturn	Stadia	Google Stadia
Wii	Wii, WiiWare, Wii Virtual Console	WiiU	Wii U, WiiU Virtual Console	WIN	Windows, all versions Windows 95 and up
WP	Windows Phone	XB	Xbox, Xbox Live Arcade	XB360	Xbox 360, Xbox 360 Live Arcade
XBO	Xbox One	XBX/S	Xbox Series X/S	Zune	Zune HD

== List ==
Title	Developer	Platform	Release date	Ref.
1... 2... 3... KICK IT! (Drop That Beat Like an Ugly Baby)	Dejobaan Games	WIN	April 1, 2011	Home; Steam
A-Band	Flammable Games	XB	April 13, 2012	Xbox
A Dance of Fire and Ice	7th Beat Games	WIN, iOS, DROID, NS	January 25, 2019	HomeSteam
Alvin and the Chipmunks	Sensory Sweep Studios	DS, Wii, PS2, WIN	December 4, 2007	Home
Alvin and the Chipmunks: The Squeakquel	ImaginEngine	DS, Wii	December 1, 2009 (NA)	Home
Alvin and the Chipmunks: Chipwrecked	Behaviour Interactive	DS, Wii, XB360, PS2	November 15, 2011 (NA); November 25, 2011 (EU)	Home
Angelic Concert	Kogado Studio	WIN, PS2, XB	January 19, 2001: Windows; January 19, 2001 (JP); PlayStation 2; March 13, 2003 (JP); Xbox; March 13, 2003 (JP)	Home
Angelic Concert ~ Encore	Kogado Studio	WIN	December 3, 2004 (JP)	Home
AS ~ Angelic Serenade	Kogado Studio	WIN	March 29, 2002 (JP)	Home
ASDVD ~ Umareta Bakari no Love Song	Kogado Studio	WIN	September 19, 2003 (JP)	Home
Amplitude	Harmonix	PS2	March 24, 2003 (NA); September 26, 2003 (EU)	Home; DE.PS2
Arcaea	lowiro	iOS, DROID, NS	March 9, 2017: iOS/Android; March 9, 2017; Nintendo Switch; May 18, 2021	Home
Audiosurf	Dylan Fitterer	WIN, Zune	February 15, 2008	Steam; Home
Audiosurf 2	Dylan Fitterer	WIN	October 3, 2013	Steam; Home
Audition Online	T3 Entertainment	WIN	2004: 2004 (KOR) September 1, 2006 (SGP) April 2, 2007 (NA) May 31, 2007 (UK) June 25, 2007 (EU)	Home
Band Hero	Neversoft; Budcat Creations; Vicarious Visions	PS2, PS3, Wii, XB360, DS	November 3, 2009 (NA); November 6, 2009 (EU); November 25, 2009 (AUS)	Home
Beat Hazard	Cold Beam Games	WIN, OSX, PS3, XB360, DROID, iOS	April 16, 2010	Steam; Home
Beat the Song	AAAGAMES	WIN	August 28, 2018	Steam
The Beatles: Rock Band	Harmonix; Pi Studios	PS3, Wii, XB	September 9, 2009	Home
Beatmania	Konami	Arcade	December 1, 1997 (JP)	Home
Beatmania IIDX	Konami	Arcade	February 26, 1999 (JP)	Home
Before the Echo (Sequence)	Iridium Studios	XB360, WIN, OSX, LIN	May 5, 2011: Xbox 360; May 5, 2011; Windows; October 20, 2011; OS X, Linux; October 15, 2015	Home; Steam
Bit.Trip Beat	Gaijin Games	Wii, iOS, WIN, OSX, 3DS, DROID, LIN, NS	March 16, 2009: Wii (WiiWare); March 16, 2009 (NA) April 28, 2009 (JP) May 1, 2009 (PAL); iOS; September 30, 2010 (NA); Windows; November 2, 2010 (NA); OS X; November 2, 2010 (NA); Wii; September 13, 2011 (NA) March 16, 2012 (PAL); Nintendo 3DS; September 13, 2011 (NA) March 16, 2012 (EU) July 10, 2013 (JP); Android; August 15, 2012 (WW); Linux; August 15, 2012 (WW); Nintendo Switch; December 25, 2020 (WW)	Steam
Bit.Trip Core	Gaijin Games	Wii, 3DS, WIN, NS	July 6, 2009: Wii (WiiWare); July 6, 2009 (NA) August 4, 2009 (JP) August 21, 2009 (PAL); Nintendo 3DS; September 13, 2011 (NA) March 16, 2012 (EU); Steam; October 3, 2012 (WW); Nintendo Switch; December 25, 2020 (WW)	Steam
Bit.Trip Fate	Gaijin Games	Wii, Wii, 3DS, WIN, OSX, NS	October 25, 2010: Wii (WiiWare); October 25, 2010 (NA) November 19, 2010 (PAL); Wii; September 13, 2011 (NA) March 16, 2012 (PAL); Nintendo 3DS; September 13, 2011 (NA) March 16, 2012 (EU) July 10, 2013 (JP); Steam; July 11, 2013 (WW); Nintendo Switch; December 25, 2020 (WW)	Steam; Home; Nintendo
Bit.Trip Flux	Gaijin Games	Wii, 3DS, NS	February 25, 2011: Wii (WiiWare); February 28, 2011 (NA) February 25, 2011 (PAL); Wii; September 13, 2011 (NA) March 16, 2012 (PAL); Nintendo 3DS; September 13, 2011 (NA) March 16, 2012 (EU) July 10, 2013 (JP); Nintendo Switch; December 25, 2020 (WW)	Steam
Bit.Trip Presents... Runner2: Future Legend of Rhythm Alien	Gaijin Games	WIN, OSX, LIN, iOS, PS3, WiiU, XB360, PSV, NS	February 26, 2013: Wii U (eShop); February 26, 2013 (NA) April 11, 2013 (EU) August 22, 2013 (AUS); Xbox 360 (XBLA); February 27, 2013 (WW); Windows, OS X, Linux (Steam); February 26, 2013 (WW); PlayStation 3 (PSN); March 5, 2013 (NA) August 21, 2013 (EU); PlayStation Vita; December 17, 2013 (WW); iOS; October 13, 2013 (WW); Nintendo Switch; February 29, 2024 (WW)	Steam
Bit.Trip Runner	Gaijin Games	Wii, WIN, OSX, 3DS, LIN, NS	May 14, 2010: May 17, 2010 (NA) September 14, 2010 (JP) May 14, 2010 (PAL); Wii; September 13, 2011 (NA) March 16, 2012 (PAL); Nintendo 3DS; September 13, 2011 (NA) March 16, 2012 (EU) July 10, 2013 (JP); Steam; February 28, 2011 (WW); Nintendo Switch; December 25, 2020 (WW)	Steam
Bit.Trip Void	Gaijin Games	Wii, 3DS, WIN, OSX, NS	March 5, 2010: October 27, 2009 (JP) November 23, 2009 (NA) March 5, 2010 (PAL); Wii; September 13, 2011 (NA) March 16, 2012 (PAL); Nintendo 3DS; September 13, 2011 (NA) March 16, 2012 (EU) July 10, 2013 (JP); Steam; 2012-12-19 (WIN) (WW) 2013-01-30 (OSX) (WW); Nintendo Switch; December 25, 2020 (WW)	Steam
Bollywood Wannabe	Chrysaor Studio	WIN	January 31, 2013	Home; Steam
Break Blocks	Greater Good Games	WIN, OSX	February 28, 2012	Home; Steam
Britney's Dance Beat	Metro; Hyperspace Cowgirls	PS2, GBA, WIN	May 8, 2002	Home
Canmusic	Hanseul Soft	WIN		
Cartoon Network 'Toon Jam!	Turner Interactive	WIN	1995	
Chime	Zoë Mode	XB360, WIN, PS3	February 2, 2010	
Chunithm	Sega	Arcade	July 16, 2015	Home
Chunithm Plus	Sega	Arcade	February 4, 2016	Home
Chunithm Air	Sega	Arcade	August 25, 2016	Home
Chunithm Air Plus	Sega	Arcade	February 9, 2017	Home
Dance Central	Harmonix	XB360	November 4, 2010: November 4, 2010 (NA) November 10, 2010 (EU) November 18, 2010 (AUS) June 2, 2011 (JP)	Home
Dance Central 2	Harmonix	XB360	October 21, 2011: October 21, 2011 (AUS/EU) October 25, 2011 (NA) October 27, 2011 (JP)	Home
Dance Central 3	Harmonix; Backbone Entertainment	XB360	October 16, 2012: October 16, 2012 (NA) October 18, 2012 (JP) October 19, 2012 (AUS/EU)	Home
Dance Dance Revolution	Konami	Arcade	November 21, 1998	DDR Gateway
Dance Dance Revolution	Konami	Arcade	March 14, 2013	DDR Gateway
Dance Dance Revolution 2ndMix	Konami Computer Entertainment Tokyo	Arcade, PS1, DC	January 29, 1999: Arcade; January 29, 1999 (JP); PlayStation; August 28, 1999 (JP); Dreamcast; February 17, 2000 (JP)	
Dance Dance Revolution 3rdMix	Konami Computer Entertainment Tokyo	Arcade, PS1	October 30, 1999: Arcade; October 30, 1999 (JP/AS) 2000–03 (KOR); PlayStation; June 1, 2000 (JP) 2000-06-21 (Plus) (JP)	
Dance Dance Revolution Extreme JP	Konami Computer Entertainment Tokyo	Arcade, PS2	December 25, 2002: Arcade; December 25, 2002 (JP); PlayStation 2; October 9, 2003 (JP)	
Dance Dance Revolution Extreme NA	Konami Computer Entertainment Tokyo	PS2	September 21, 2004 (NA)	
Dance Dance Revolution Ultramix	Konami	XB	November 19, 2003 (NA)	
Dance Dance Revolution Ultramix 2	Konami Digital Entertainment	XB	November 18, 2004 (NA)	
Dance! Online	9you	WIN	March 2007	
Dancing with the Stars	Zoë Mode; Aurona n-Space	PS2, Wii, WIN, MOBI	October 23, 2007 (NA)	
DDR Festival Dance Dance Revolution	Konami Computer Entertainment Japan	PS2	November 18, 2004 (JP)	Home
Dear Pianissimo	Kogado Studio	WIN	August 11, 2006 (JP)	Home
Dear Pianissimo Refrain	Kogado Studio	WIN	June 29, 2007 (JP)	Home
Deemo	Rayark	NS, PS4, iOS, DROID, WIN, PSV	November 13, 2013	HomeSteam
Descend the Beat	Baygull Studios LLC	WIN, OSX, iOS, DROID	2011	Home
Descend the Beat HD	Baygull Studios LLC	WIN, OSX, iOS, DROID	October 12, 2011	Home; Indievania
Digital Dance Mix Vol. 1 Namie Amuro	Sega AM2	SAT	January 10, 1997 (JP)	Sega AM2
DJ Hero	FreeStyleGames; Exient Entertainment	PS2, PS3, Wii, XB360	October 27, 2009 (NA); October 28, 2009 (AUS); October 29, 2009 (EU)	
DJ Hero 2	FreeStyleGames	PS3, Wii, XB360	October 19, 2010 (NA/AUS); October 22, 2010 (EU)	
DJ Max Technika Tune	Pentavision	PSV	December 4, 2012	Home
DJ Max Trilogy	Pentavision	WIN	December 25, 2008	
DJ Wars	Spike	SAT	December 18, 1997 (JP)	
Donkey Konga	Nintendo	NGC	December 12, 2003	
Drum Mania	Bemani	Arcade, PS2	July 10, 1999: Arcade; July 10, 1999; PlayStation 2; March 4, 2000	Home
Elite Beat Agents	iNiS	DS	November 6, 2006 (NA); May 3, 2007 (AUS); July 13, 2007 (EU)	
Eggs Hero	AkadeM и Shootka	DROID	December 3, 2017	Google Play Store
Frederic: Resurrection of Music	Forever Entertainment S.A.	WIN, OSX, MOBI, WiiU	July 3, 2012	Big Fish
Frequency	Harmonix	PS2	November 20, 2001 (NA); June 28, 2002 (PAL)	Home; US.PS2
Frets on Fire	Unreal Voodoo	WIN, LIN, OSX	August 3, 2006	Home; FOF.SF; SF
Frets on Fire X	Frets On Fire X	WIN, OSX, LIN	February 21, 2009	Mod DB
Friday Night Funkin'	The Funkin' Crew Inc.	WIN, OSX, LIN	November 1, 2020	Itch.io
Geometry Dash	RobTop Games	WIN, OSX, iOS, DROID	August 13, 2013	RobTop Games
Gitaroo Man	Koei iNiS	PS2, PSP	June 21, 2001: PlayStation 2; June 21, 2001 (JP) February 18, 2002 (NA) June 21, 2002 (EU); PlayStation Portable; June 8, 2006 (JP) September 29, 2006 (EU) November 14, 2006 (NA)	
Groove Coaster (Rhythmvaders)	Matrix Software	Arcade, DROID, iOS	July 28, 2011: Groove Coaster; Arcade: November 5, 2013; iOS: July 28, 2011; Groove Coaster Zero; iOS: November 20, 2012; Groove Coaster EX; Arcade: May 26, 2014; Groove Coaster 2: Heavenly Festival; Arcade: January 22, 2015; Groove Coaster 2: Original Style; Android: July 1, 2015; iOS: July 1, 2015; Groove Coaster 3: Link Fever; Arcade: March 10, 2016; Groove Coaster 3EX: Dream Party; Arcade: March 16, 2017	Home (iOS, Android)
Guitar Freaks	Bemani	Arcade, PS1, PS2	February 1, 1999 (JP)	Home
Guitar Freaks Append 2nd Mix	Konami	PS1	February 24, 2000 (JP)	JP.PS1
Guitar Freaks 3rd Mix & DrumMania 2nd Mix	KCEJ	PS2	December 7, 2000	
Guitar Hero	Harmonix	PS2	November 8, 2005 (NA); April 7, 2006 (EU); June 15, 2006 (AUS)	
Guitar Hero 5	Neversoft; Budcat Creations; Vicarious Visions	PS2, PS3, Wii, XB360	September 1, 2009 (NA); September 11, 2009 (EU); September 16, 2009 (AUS)	
Guitar Hero Encore: Rocks the 80s	Harmonix	PS2	July 24, 2007 (NA); July 27, 2007 (EU); August 1, 2007 (AUS)	
Guitar Hero II	Harmonix	PS2, XB360	November 7, 2006: PlayStation 2; November 7, 2006 (NA) November 15, 2006 (AUS) November 24, 2006 (EU); Xbox 360; April 3, 2007 (NA) April 4, 2007 (AUS) April 6, 2007 (EU)	
Guitar Hero III: Legends of Rock	Neversoft; Budcat Creations; Vicarious Visions	PS2, PS3, Wii, XB360, WIN, OSX	October 28, 2007: Console; October 28, 2007 (NA) November 7, 2007 (AUS) November 23, 2007 (EU) 2008-03-06 (PS2 & PS3); 2008-05-22 (Wii); 2008-07-24 (XB360) (JP); Windows; November 13, 2007 (NA) November 30, 2007 (EU) April 19, 2008 (AUS); Mac OS X; December 10, 2007 (NA) January 21, 2008 (EU)	
Guitar Hero: On Tour	Vicarious Visions	DS	June 22, 2008	
Guitar Hero On Tour: Decades	Vicarious Visions	DS	November 16, 2008	
Guitar Hero On Tour: Modern Hits	Vicarious Visions	DS	June 9, 2009	
Guitar Hero: Smash Hits	Beenox Studios	PS2, PS3, Wii, XB360	June 16, 2009 (NA); June 24, 2009 (AUS); June 26, 2009 (EU)	
Guitar Hero World Tour	Neversoft; Budcat Creations; Vicarious Visions	PS2, PS3, Wii, XB360, WIN, OSX	October 26, 2008: 2008-10-26; 2009-07-26 (WIN & OSX) (NA) 2008-11-07; 2008-11-14 (PS3); 2008-11-21 (PS2) (EU) November 12, 2008 (AUS)	
Guitar Hero: Aerosmith	Neversoft; Budcat Creations; Vicarious Visions	PS2, PS3, Wii, XB360, WIN, OSX	June 27, 2008: Console; June 27, 2008 (EU) June 29, 2008 (NA) August 6, 2008 (AUS) October 9, 2008 (JP); Windows; October 17, 2008 (NA); OS X; November 3, 2008 (NA)	
Guitar Hero: Metallica	Neversoft	PS2, PS3, Wii, XB360	March 29, 2009: PlayStation 3, Wii & Xbox 360; March 29, 2009 (NA) May 27, 2009 (AUS) May 29, 2009 (EU); PlayStation 2; April 14, 2009 (NA) May 27, 2009 (AUS) May 29, 2009 (EU)	
Guitar Hero: Van Halen	Neversoft; Underground Development	PS2, PS3, Wii, XB360	December 22, 2009 (NA); February 17, 2010 (AUS); February 19, 2010 (EU)	
Guitar Hero: Warriors of Rock	Neversoft; Vicarious Visions	PS3, Wii, XB360	September 24, 2010 (EU); September 28, 2010 (NA); September 29, 2010 (AUS)	
Guitar Praise	Digital Praise	WIN, OSX	September 25, 2008	
Guitar Rising	GameTank	WIN, OSX, PS3, XB360	December 8, 2012	
GuitarBots	Ovelin		November 21, 2012	Ovelin
GuitarTuna	Ovelin	iOS, DROID	November 2, 2012	Ovelin
Hatsune Miku and Future Stars: Project Mirai	Sega	3DS	March 8, 2012 (JP)	Home
Hatsune Miku: Project Mirai 2	Sega	3DS	November 28, 2013 (JP); September 8, 2015 (NA); September 11, 2015 (PAL)	Home
Hatsune Miku: Live Stage Producer	Sega	DROID, iOS	November 22, 2012: Android; November 22, 2012 (JP); iOS; December 6, 2012 (JP)	Home
Project DIVA	Sega	PSP, PS3	July 2, 2009 (JP)	Home
Hatsune Miku: Project DIVA 2nd	Sega	PSP, PS3	July 29, 2010 (JP)	Home
Hatsune Miku: Project DIVA Arcade	Sega	Arcade	January 1, 2010 (JP)	Home
Hatsune Miku: Project DIVA Extend	Sega	PSP, PS3	November 10, 2011 (JP)	Home
Hatsune Miku: Project DIVA F	Sega	PSV, PS3	August 30, 2012: PlayStation Vita; August 30, 2012 (JP); PlayStation 3; March 7, 2013 (JP)	Home
Hatsune Miku: Project Diva Pack 1 – Okawari	Sega	PSP	March 25, 2010 (JP)	Home
Hatsune Miku: Project Diva Pack 2 – Motto	Sega	PSP	July 1, 2010 (JP)	Home
High School Musical 3: Senior Year Dance	Page 44 Studios	PS2, Wii, WIN, XB360	October 31, 2008: Wii; October 21, 2008 (NA) November 14, 2008 (EU) December 10, 2008 (AUS); PlayStation 2; October 28, 2008 (NA) November 7, 2008 (EU) December 10, 2008 (AUS); Xbox 360; October 28, 2008 (NA) November 7, 2008 (EU) November 23, 2008 (AUS); Windows; October 31, 2008 (NA)	
In the Groove	Roxor Games	Arcade, OSX, PS2, WIN	August 30, 2004: Arcade; August 30, 2004 (NA); PlayStation 2; June 17, 2005 (NA) August 21, 2006 (EU); OS X, Windows; August 21, 2006 (NA)	
In the Groove 2	Roxor Games	Arcade	June 18, 2005	
InstrumentChamp	Music Instrument Champ AB	WIN, OSX	TBA (WW)	Home
Jubeat	Konami	Arcade	July 24, 2008	Home
Jung Rhythm	Altron	SAT	January 15, 1998 (JP)	
Jungle Rumble	Disco Pixel	iOS, DROID, PSV	February 2015	Home
Just Dance	Ubisoft Paris; Ubisoft Milan	Wii	November 17, 2009 (NA); November 26, 2009 (AUS); November 27, 2009 (EU)	
Just Dance 2	Ubisoft Paris; Ubisoft Milan	Wii	October 12, 2010 (NA); October 14, 2010 (AUS/EU)	
Just Dance 3	Ubisoft Paris; Ubisoft Reflections; Ubisoft Montreal	Wii, XB360, PS3	October 7, 2011: Wii & Xbox 360; October 7, 2011 (NA) October 11, 2011 (AUS/EU); PlayStation 3; December 6, 2011 (NA) December 8, 2011 (AUS) December 9, 2011 (EU)	
Just Dance 4	Ubisoft Milan; Ubisoft Paris; Ubisoft Reflections; Ubisoft Bucharest; Ubisoft Pune	Wii, XB360, PS3, WiiU	October 2, 2012: Wii, Xbox 360 & PlayStation 3; October 2, 2012 (EU/AUS) October 9, 2012 (NA); Wii U; November 18, 2012 (NA) November 30, 2012 (EU/AUS)	
Just Dance 2014	Ubisoft Milan; Ubisoft Paris; Ubisoft Reflections; Ubisoft Bucharest; Ubisoft Pune; Ubisoft Montpellier; Ubisoft Barcelona	Wii, XB360, PS3, WiiU, PS4, XBO	October 1, 2013: Wii, Xbox 360, PlayStation 3 & Wii U; October 1, 2013 (EU/AUS) October 4, 2013 (UK) October 8, 2013 (NA); PlayStation 4; November 15, 2013 (NA) November 29, 2013 (EU/AUS); Xbox One; November 22, 2013	
Just Dance 2015	Ubisoft Milan; Ubisoft Paris; Ubisoft Reflections; Ubisoft Bucharest; Ubisoft Pune	Wii, XB360, PS3, WiiU, PS4, XBO	October 21, 2014 (NA); October 23, 2014 (EU/AUS); August 25, 2015 (CHN)	
Just Dance 2016	Ubisoft Milan; Ubisoft Paris; Ubisoft Pune	Wii, XB360, PS3, WiiU, PS4, XBO	October 20, 2015 (NA); October 22, 2015 (EU); October 23, 2015 (UK)	
Just Dance 2017	Ubisoft Milan; Ubisoft Paris; Ubisoft Reflections; Ubisoft Pune	Wii, XB360, PS3, WiiU, PS4, XBO, WIN, OSX, NS	October 25, 2016: Xbox 360, Xbox One, PlayStation 3, PlayStation 4, Wii, Wii U, Windows & macOS; October 25, 2016 (NA) October 27, 2016 (EU) October 28, 2016 (UK) October 29, 2016 (AUS) April 28, 2017 (CHN); Nintendo Switch; March 3, 2017	
Just Dance 2018	Ubisoft Milan; Ubisoft Paris; Ubisoft Shanghai; Ubisoft Bucharest; Ubisoft Montreal	Wii, XB360, PS3, WiiU, PS4, XBO, NS	October 24, 2017 (NA); October 26, 2017 (AUS/EU)	
Just Dance 2019	Ubisoft Paris; Ubisoft Shanghai; Ubisoft Pune	Wii, XB360, WiiU, PS4, XBO, NS	October 23, 2018 (NA); October 25, 2018 (AUS/EU)	
Just Dance 2020	Ubisoft Paris; Ubisoft Shanghai; Ubisoft Pune; Ubisoft Bordeaux	Wii, PS4, XBO, NS, Stadia	November 5, 2019 (NA/AUS/EU); March 12, 2020 (JP); December 24, 2020 (CHN)	
Just Dance 2021	Ubisoft Paris	PS4, XBO, NS, Stadia, PS5, XBX/S	November 12, 2020: Xbox One, PlayStation 4, Nintendo Switch & Stadia; November 12, 2020; Xbox Series X/S & PlayStation 5; November 24, 2020	
Just Dance 2022	Ubisoft Paris; Ubisoft Shanghai; Ubisoft Pune; Room8	PS4, XBO, NS, Stadia, PS5, XBX/S	November 4, 2021	
Just Dance 2023 Edition	Ubisoft Paris	NS, PS5, XBX/S	November 22, 2022	
Kudos: Rock Legend	Positech Games	OSX, WIN	June 1, 2007 (NA)	
Lyroke	We R Interactive	iOS, DROID	January 1, 2013 (NA/EU)	Home
Maestro! Jump in Music	Pastagames, Neko Entertainment	DS, iOS	November 6, 2009	
Maimai	Sega	Arcade	July 11, 2012: maimai; July 11, 2012 (JP); maimai PLUS; December 13, 2012 (JP); maimai GReeN; July 11, 2013 (JP); maimai GReeN PLUS; February 26, 2014 (JP); maimai ORANGE; September 18, 2014 (JP); maimai ORANGE PLUS; March 19, 2015 (JP); maimai PiNK; December 10, 2015 (JP); maimai PiNK PLUS; June 30, 2016 (JP); maimai MURASAKi; December 15, 2016 (JP); maimai MURASAKi PLUS; June 22, 2017 (JP); maimai MiLK; December 14, 2017 (JP); maimai MiLK PLUS; June 21, 2018 (JP); maimai FiNALE; December 13, 2018 (JP)	Home
Maimai DX	Sega	Arcade	July 11, 2019: maimai DX; July 11, 2019 (JP); maimai DX PLUS; January 23, 2020 (JP); maimai DX Splash; September 17, 2020 (JP); maimai DX Splash PLUS; March 18, 2021 (JP); maimai DX UNiVERSE; September 16, 2021 (JP); maimai DX UNiVERSE PLUS; March 24, 2022 (JP)	Home
Major Minor's Majestic March	NanaOn-Sha	Wii	April 23, 2009 (JP); March 24, 2009 (NA); June 26, 2009 (EU)	
Micron	Apparition Games	WIN, OSX, LIN, iOS, DROID	August 5, 2012 (US)	Home
Mojib-Ribbon	NanaOn-Sha	PS2	November 20, 2003	
Museca	Bemani	Arcade	December 10, 2015	
Muse Dash	PeroPeroGames	iOS, DROID, WIN, NS	June 14, 2018: iOS/Android; June 14, 2018; Steam/Nintendo eShop; June 20, 2019	Home; Steam
Musync	I-Inferno	PSV, iOS	June 24, 2014	
Musynx	PM Studios	NS, PS4, PSV		
Music Run	Pocket Maestro	DROID	July 10, 2015	Google Play Store
Miku Flick	Sega; Crypton Future Media	iOS	March 9, 2012 (JP); April 9, 2012 (NA)	Home
Miku Flick/02	Sega; Crypton Future Media	iOS	August 10, 2012 (JP/NA)	Home
The Naked Brothers Band	Barking Lizards Technologies; 1st Playable Productions	WIN, PS2, DS, Wii	October 20, 2008	
Neon FM	Unit-e Global	Arcade, DROID, iOS	2013: Arcade; 2013; Android/iOS; April 2017	Home
Norwegian Wood	No Fun Games	WIN, OSX, LIN	September 24, 2009	Home
NoteBlaster	Collinator Studios Inc.	iOS	December 15, 2016	Home
O2Jam	O2Media	WIN	June 10, 2003	
O2Jam Analog	Nowcom	iOS, DROID	July 3, 2011	
O2Jam U	MOMO Corp	iOS, DROID		
Ongaku	SmashMouthGames	WIN	October 8, 2010	Home
ONGEKI	SEGA	Arcade	July 26, 2018	Home
Osada	Amanita Design	WIN	April 6, 2011	Home
osu!	Dean "peppy" Herbert	WIN, OSX, LIN, iOS, DROID	September 16, 2007	Home
PaRappa the Rapper	NanaOn-Sha	PS1, PSP, PS4	December 6, 1996: PlayStation; December 6, 1996 (JP) September 26, 1997 (EU) October 31, 1997 (NA); PlayStation Portable; December 7, 2006 (JP) July 6, 2007 (EU) July 17, 2007 (NA) August 9, 2007 (AU); Playstation 4; April 4, 2017 (WW)	
PaRappa the Rapper 2	NanaOn-Sha	PS2, PS4	August 30, 2001: PlayStation; August 30, 2001 (JP) January 21, 2002 (NA) April 5, 2002 (EU); PlayStation 4; December 14, 2015 (WW)	
Phase Shift	DWSK	WIN	March 20, 2010	Home
Piano Tiles	Hu Wen Zeng; Cheetah Mobile; Umoni Studio	iOS, DROID, WP	March 28, 2014	Home iT; G.P; WP
Piano Tiles 2	Cheetah Mobile	iOS, DROID	August 24, 2015	G.P iT
Phigros	Pigeon Games	iOS, DROID	August 31, 2019	
Pop'n Music	Konami	Arcade	September 29, 1998	Home
Quaver	Swan	WIN, LIN	July 10, 2020	HomeSteam
Quest for Fame	Virtual Music Entertainment	WIN, OS2, PS1, Arcade, MAC	1995	
R: Rock'n Riders	PIXY Corporation	PS1	April 1, 1999	
Reflec Beat	Konami	Arcade	November 4, 2010	
Remembering	Monobanda & SonicPicnic, Netherlands	WIN, MAC	April 1, 1999	Home
Rhythm Destruction	Curious Panda	WIN	October 2012	Home
Rhythm Doctor	7th Beat Games	WIN, OSX, LIN, XBO, XBX/S	2020	HomeSteam
Rhythm Heaven	Nintendo SPD1	DS	July 31, 2008: July 31, 2008 (JP) April 5, 2009 (NA) May 1, 2009 (EU) September 24, 2009 (KR)	
Rhythm Heaven Fever	Nintendo SPD; TNS	Wii	July 21, 2011: July 21, 2011 (JP) February 13, 2012 (NA) July 6, 2012 (EU) September 13, 2012 (AUS)	
Rhythm Heaven Groove	Nintendo EPD	Switch	July 2, 2026	
Rhythm Heaven Megamix	Nintendo SPD	3DS	June 11, 2015: June 11, 2015 (JP) June 16, 2016 (NA) October 21, 2016 (EU) October 22, 2016 (AUS) December 1, 2016 (KR)	
Rhythm Tengoku	Nintendo SPD	GBA, Arcade	August 3, 2006: Game Boy Advance; August 3, 2006; Arcade; September 20, 2007	
Rhythm Thief & the Emperor's Treasure	Sega; Xeen	3DS, iOS	January 19, 2012: Nintendo 3DS; January 19, 2012 (JP) April 5, 2012 (EU) April 12, 2012 (AUS) July 10, 2012 (NA); iOS; January 9, 2014	
Rhythm Zone	Sonic Boom	iOS, WIN	July 20, 2010: Windows; July 20, 2010; iOS; May 18, 2011	
Rock Band	Harmonix; Pi Studios	XB360, PS3, PS2, Wii	November 20, 2007: Xbox 360; November 20, 2007 (NA) September 12, 2008 (EU) November 7, 2008 (AUS); PlayStation 3; November 20, 2007 (NA) September 12, 2008 (EU) November 7, 2008 (AUS); PlayStation 2; December 17, 2007 (NA) September 12, 2008 (EU) November 7, 2008 (AUS); Wii; June 22, 2008 (NA) September 12, 2008 (EU) November 7, 2008 (AUS)	
Rock Band 2	Harmonix; Pi Studios	XB360, PS3, PS2, Wii	October 19, 2008: Xbox 360; September 14, 2008 (NA) 2008-10-19 (Bundle); 2008-11-21 (EU); PlayStation 3; October 19, 2008 (NA) March 27, 2009 (EU); PlayStation 2; December 18, 2008 (NA) March 27, 2009 (EU); Wii; December 18, 2008 (NA) October 9, 2009 (EU)	
Rock Band 3	Harmonix; Backbone Entertainment	XB360, PS3, Wii, DS	October 26, 2010 (NA); October 28, 2010 (AUS); October 29, 2010 (EU)	
Rocksmith	Ubisoft San Francisco	WIN, PS3, XB360	October 18, 2011: PlayStation 3, Xbox 360; October 18, 2011 (NA) September 28, 2012 (EU) September 13, 2012 (AUS) October 11, 2012 (JP); Windows; October 16, 2012 (NA) October 18, 2012 (EU)	
Rocksmith 2014	Ubisoft San Francisco	WIN, PS3, XB360, PS4, XBO	November 4, 2014	
Rotaeno	XD inc.	iOS, DROID	May 30, 2022	
Runner3	Choice Provisions	WIN, OSX, NS, PS4	May 22, 2018: Windows, macOS, Nintendo Switch; May 22, 2018 (WW); PlayStation 4; November 13, 2018 (WW)	
Samba de Amigo	Sonic Team; Gearbox Software	Arcade, DC, Wii	December 1999: Arcade; December 1, 1999 (JP) 2000–03 (NA); Ver. 2000; December 14, 2000 (JP); Dreamcast; April 27, 2000 (JP) October 16, 2000 (NA) December 8, 2000 (EU); Wii; September 23, 2008 (NA) September 26, 2008 (EU) October 2, 2008 (AUS) December 11, 2008 (JP)	
Samba de Amigo: Party Central	Sega	NS, Quest	August 29, 2023: Nintendo Switch; August 29, 2023; Meta Quest; Fall 2023	Home
Santa Rockstar HD	Bekho Team	WIN, OSX	December 11, 2011	Home
SingStar	London Studio	PS2, PS3	May 2004: Original; May 2004; Latest; October 2011	Home
Smile Shooter ~First Ticket~	Kogado Studio	WIN	January 14, 2011 (JP)	Home
Solfège	Kogado Studio	WIN	December 21, 2007 (JP)	Home
Solfège ~Sweet Harmony~	Kogado Studio	PSP	December 18, 2008 (JP)	Home
Solfège ~La Finale~	Kogado Studio	WIN	November 5, 2009 (JP)	Home
Sound Voltex	Konami	Arcade	January 18, 2012	Home
Space Channel 5	United Game Artists; Art Co., Ltd	DC, PS2, GBA	December 16, 1999: Dreamcast; December 16, 1999 (JP) June 4, 2000 (NA) October 6, 2000 (EU); PlayStation 2; March 15, 2002 (EU) December 12, 2002 (JP) November 18, 2003 (NA); Game Boy Advance; March 6, 2003 (EU) June 17, 2003 (NA)	
Space Channel 5: Part 2	United Game Artists	DC, PS2, PS3, WIN, XB360	February 14, 2002: Dreamcast; February 14, 2002 (JP); PlayStation 2; February 14, 2002 (JP) February 12, 2003 (EU) November 18, 2003 (NA); Steam; March 5, 2011 (WW); PlayStation 3 (PSN); October 4, 2011 (NA) October 5, 2011 (EU/JP); Xbox 360 (XBLA); October 5, 2011 (WW)	Steam
Space Music	ajm113	WIN	February 14, 2009	Mod DB
Star Melody Yumemi Dreamer	Kogado Studio	NS, WIN	November 4, 2021: Nintendo Switch; November 4, 2021 (JP); Windows; January 21, 2022 (WW)	HomeSteam
StepMania	Many	WIN, OSX, LIN	August 21, 2001	Home
StepManiaX	Step Revolution	Arcade	2017	Home
SuperStar SMTOWN	S.M. Entertainment, Dalcomsoft Inc.	iOS, DROID	August 26, 2014	Home; App Store; Google Play Store
Symphonic Rain	Kogado Studio	WIN	March 26, 2004 (JP)	Home
Symphonic Rain - Treasure Edition	Kogado Studio	WIN	June 24, 2005 (JP)	Home
Symphonic Rain - 2017 Remaster Edition	Kogado Studio	WIN, NS	June 15, 2017: Windows; June 15, 2017 (WW); Nintendo Switch; December 13, 2018 (JP)	HomeSteam
Tadpole Treble	BitFinity	WIN, LIN, OSX, NS	August 2, 2016	Home
Taiko no Tatsujin	Namco	Arcade	February 21, 2001	Home
Turba	Binary Takeover	WIN	April 4, 2010	Steam; Home; Mod DB
UltraStar	Loud Arts	WIN, LIN, OSX	May 2012	Home
Um Jammer Lammy	NaNaOn-Sha; Namco	Arcade, PS1, PSN	March 18, 1999: PlayStation; March 18, 1999 (JP) January 5, 2000 (NA) September 19, 2001 (EU); Arcade; 1999 (JP); PlayStation Network (PS3); February 27, 2008 (JP) October 1, 2009 (NA) December 12, 2012 (EU)	
Vib-Ribbon	NanaOn-Sha	PS1, PS3, PSP, PSV	December 12, 1999: PlayStation; December 12, 1999 (JP) September 1, 2000 (EU); PlayStation 3, PlayStation Portable & PlayStation Vita; August 7, 2014 (NA) August 15, 2014 (EU)	
Virtual Orchestra Studio (VOS)	Hanseul Soft	WIN		
vivid/stasis	Team Vividstasis	WIN	March 7, 2023	Steam
VOEZ	Rayark Games	iOS, DROID	May 26, 2016: iOS; May 26, 2016 (WW); Android; June 2, 2016 (WW)	Home
WildChords	Ovelin	iOS	February 8, 2012	Ovelin
WGiBeat	thomeval	WIN	January 30, 2011	Code.Google
Yousician	Yousician	iOS, DROID, OSX, WIN	November 1, 2014	Yousician

== See also ==
- List of artists who have portrayed themselves in music games
- List of GuitarFreaks games
