= Bit.Trip Saga =

2011 video game

- North American box art
- Developer: Gaijin Games
- Publishers: NA: Aksys Games; PAL: Rising Star Games
- Series: Bit.Trip
- Platform: Nintendo 3DS
- Release: NA: September 13, 2011; PAL: March 16, 2012; JP: July 10, 2013
- Genre: Music
- Mode: Single-player

Bit.Trip Saga (stylized as BIT.TRIP SAGA) is a music video game developed by Gaijin Games and published by Aksys Games for the Nintendo 3DS. It was released on September 13, 2011 in North America, a year later in the PAL region by Rising Star Games on March 16, 2012, and another year later in Japan by Arc System Works on July 10, 2013. It is a compilation of the six downloadable video games released for the Nintendo Wii's WiiWare service, including Bit.Trip Beat (2009), Bit.Trip Core (2009), Bit.Trip Void (2009), Bit.Trip Runner (2010), Bit.Trip Fate (2010), and Bit.Trip Flux (2011).

== Gameplay ==
All six of the Bit.Trip titles support the Nintendo 3DS' stereoscopic 3D visual effects. All of the games feature "simple graphics" and "challenging gameplay tied to a soundtrack of Atari 2600-like bleeps".

== Development ==
Bit.Trip Saga was announced on April 28, 2011 in a press release by Aksys Games, its publisher. Gaijin Games, along with Aksys, was responsible for the creation of all the Bit.Trip titles included in this collection, which included Bit.Trip Beat, Bit.Trip Core, Bit.Trip Void, Bit.Trip Runner, Bit.Trip Fate, and Bit.Trip Flux.

== Reception ==
=== Pre-release ===
The release of all six Bit.Trip games in one collection garnered excitement from journalists. Kotaku's Michael McWhertor wrote that its numerous features would make it "worth the cost/wait". GameZone's David Sanchez wrote that "Bit.Trip Saga will be a worthwhile purchase for indie gamers and fans of all-around awesome games".

=== Critical ===
Reception

Aggregate score
| Aggregator | Score |
|---|---|
| Metacritic | 75/100 |

Review scores
| Publication | Score |
|---|---|
| Destructoid | 8.5/10 |
| Eurogamer | 7/10 |
| GamePro | 4/5 |
| GameSpot | 8/10 |
| GameZone | 8.5/10 |
| Giant Bomb | 3/5 |
| IGN | 8/10 |
| Nintendo Life | 7/10 |
| Nintendo Power | 8/10 |
| Nintendo World Report | 7.5/10 |
| Official Nintendo Magazine | 84% |
| Pocket Gamer | 4/5 |
| Digital Spy | 3/5 |
| Metro | 8/10 |

The game received "generally favorable reviews" according to the review aggregation website Metacritic. Metro gave the game eight out of ten, saying, "It's not quite as fully-featured as its Wii equivalent but this is still an excellent compilation of some of the best indie games of this generation." The Digital Fix gave it seven out of ten, saying, "The charming retro stylings and addictive score-based gameplay will demand multiple playthroughs for those who are up for the challenge on offer. The lack of extras is a disappointment, but the games on offer as part of the collection are some of the most addictive indie games of recent years." However, Digital Spy gave it three stars out of five, saying that the game "may be lacking in frills, but it certainly isn't short on thrills. Granted, there are occasional problems with the 3DS controls, while the lack of extras compared to the Wii release is a little disappointing, but overall Bit.Trip Saga is an entertaining collection of games well suited to the small screens of the Nintendo 3DS."
