= Bit.Trip Core =

2009 video game

- Developer: Gaijin Games
- Publisher: Aksys Games (WiiWare) Gaijin Games (PC) QubicGames (Switch)
- Designer: Alex Neuse
- Series: Bit.Trip
- Platforms: Wii; Nintendo 3DS; Windows; OS X; Nintendo Switch
- Release: WiiWare: NA: July 6, 2009; JP: August 4, 2009; PAL: August 21, 2009; Wii: NA: September 13, 2011; PAL: March 16, 2012; Nintendo 3DS: NA: September 13, 2011; EU: March 16, 2012; JP: July 10, 2013; Windows, OS X: WW: October 2, 2012; Nintendo Switch: WW: December 25, 2020
- Genres: Action, Music
- Modes: Single-player, Multiplayer

Bit.Trip Core, marketed as BIT.TRIP CORE, is a 2009 arcade-style rhythm game developed by Gaijin Games and published by Aksys Games for the Wii's WiiWare download service. It is the second game in the Bit.Trip series, directly succeeding Bit.Trip Beat and preceding Bit.Trip Void, Bit.Trip Runner, Bit.Trip Fate and Bit.Trip Flux.

== Gameplay ==
Bit.Trip Core is played with the Wii Remote controller held sideways. Players control the 'core', a plus-shaped ship located in the centre of the screen. The object of the game is to aim the core's lasers with the four directions on the D-Pad and fire the laser with the 2 Button in order to collect multi-colored dots known as 'beats'. There are three levels in total, named "Discovery", "Exploration" and "Control" respectively, each approximately 15 minutes in length. On the Steam version, players control the Core with the WASD keys and fire using Enter.

As the player builds up a score multiplier by collecting beats in a row without missing, the game transitions into Mega and Super modes, making alterations to the level's graphics and music. In addition, bombs can be acquired and used with a press of the 1 Button, which is useful for clearing the screen of beats during difficult sections. If the player misses several beats, a Nether meter fills - this puts the game into a silent, black-and-white phase. This can be escaped from if the player collects beats, but further misses before escaping the Nether will result in a Game Over.

== Development ==
Gaijin Games began development on Bit.Trip Core even before the release of Bit.Trip Beat. The game was inspired by Cosmic Ark, an Atari 2600 game that was a personal favourite of designer Alex Neuse. After going through several iterations of the game's design, which the team thought would be way too confusing, they settled on a system that shared some similarities with rhythm games such as Guitar Hero. Meanwhile, the controls were influenced by feedback from playtesters.

The game was later bundled with the other five Bit.Trip games as Bit.Trip Complete for the Wii in 2011. A Nintendo Switch port released on December 25, 2020.
