= Indie Pogo =

2018 video game

- Steam capsule image featuring a selection of the game's playable characters (Note: Characters pictured include (clockwise from left): Fishy, CommanderVideo, Orcane, Lilac, Viridian, Jack, Teslakid, Welltaro, Shovel Knight, and Velocispider.)
- Developer: Lowe Bros. Studios
- Publisher: Lowe Bros. Studios
- Director: Trevor Lowe
- Programmer: Chris Atkins
- Artist: Tyler Conley
- Composer: Robbie Dolan
- Engine: GameMaker Studio
- Platforms: Microsoft Windows, Nintendo Switch
- Release: Microsoft Windows: WW: July 10, 2018; Nintendo Switch: WW: TBA
- Genre: Fighting
- Modes: Single-player, multiplayer

Indie Pogo is an indie crossover fighting video game developed and published by Lowe Bros. Studios. The game features characters and settings from more than 50 different indie games, such as Shovel Knight, VVVVVV, Teslagrad, the Bit.Trip series, and Freedom Planet. After being successfully funded via Kickstarter in October 2017, the game was released on Microsoft Windows in July 2018. A Nintendo Switch version is currently in development.

== Gameplay ==
Indie Pogo is a platform fighter, in which up to four players battle across one of several open arenas with platforms, and attempt to defeat opponents by depleting their health or knocking them off the screen. Unlike other fighting games, the primary gameplay mechanic of Indie Pogo is auto-jumping: characters landing on the ground or a platform will automatically jump back into the air. Every character has access to a set of aerial melee attacks and special moves derived from those used in their original game, such as Shovel Knight wielding his Relics, or Captain Viridian inverting their own gravity. Characters can also perform a double-jump, a directional air-dodge, a mid-air grab, parkour movement on the ground and walls, and a charge-based attack that keeps them on the ground until the button is released. During a battle, players can initiate a "pogo combo" by repeatedly bouncing off opponents' heads without taking damage, ending when the character touches the ground. The player will gain gems by performing a successful pogo combo, and can use five of their gems to activate a character-specific super move. An update in May 2019 added optional gameplay modifiers called "Augments", up to three of which can be equipped to a character before a battle. For example, the "Air Jump" augment gives the character an additional mid-air jump, while the "Double Edged" augment doubles the amount of damage a character both deals and takes. The game currently features 15 stages to battle on, with many stages featuring unlockable alternate layouts to choose from.

The game includes a basic arcade mode that pits players against a series of opponents, culminating in a battle against the game's final boss, Crow from Starblade's Nefarious. Players can also participate in Challenge Mode, which tasks them with completing specific scenarios similar to the Event Matches in Super Smash Bros.; Infinite Pogo, in which they must defeat as many opponents as possible before their character's health is depleted; and a traditional training mode in which they can practice against an AI opponent. The game supports local four-player battles, as well as online matchmaking. Players will earn coins after each battle, which can be used at an in-game shop to purchase new characters, stages, character skins, profile emblems, and taunts; additional skins and emblems are available as premium downloadable content. Collectible in-game trophies based on other indie titles can also be obtained via completing arcade mode with each character, winning them from a bonus game, or spending coins at a gashapon machine.

== Characters ==
The game featured 14 playable characters at launch. As of October 2021, five additional characters have been added via free updates, with four other characters planned for inclusion for a total of 23.

Fighter	Playable	Game	Creator
Blockman	Yes	The Blocks Cometh	Halfbot
Bullet Kin	DLC	Enter the Gungeon	Dodge Roll
Captain Viridian	Yes	VVVVVV	Terry Cavanagh
CommanderVideo	Yes	Bit.Trip	Choice Provisions
Diogenes	DLC	Getting Over It with Bennett Foddy	Bennett Foddy
Dust	DLC (Note: Not yet released)	Dust: An Elysian Tail	Humble Hearts
Fishy	Yes	Shütshimi	Neon Deity Games
Gunvolt	DLC	Azure Striker Gunvolt	Inti Creates
Jack	Yes	Jack the Reaper	Dream's Bell
Kick	DLC	Divekick	Iron Galaxy
Meat Boy	DLC	Super Meat Boy	Team Meat
Octodad	DLC	Octodad: Dadliest Catch	Young Horses
Orcane	Yes	Rivals of Aether	Dan Fornace
Penelope	Yes	The Next Penelope	Aurélien Regard
Sash Lilac	Yes	Freedom Planet	GalaxyTrail
Shovel Knight	Yes	Shovel Knight	Yacht Club Games
Stardrop	Yes	Stardrop Sprint	Lowe Bros. Studios
Teslakid	Yes	Teslagrad	Rain Games
Velocispider	Yes	Velocispider	Retro Dreamer
Voltar the Omniscient	DLC	Awesomenauts	Ronimo Games
Welltaro	Yes	Downwell	Ojiro "Moppin" Fumoto
Yolk	DLC	Leap Day	Nitrome
Zorbié	Yes	Zorbié	Étienne Périn and Simon Périn

== Development ==
Indie Pogo drew inspiration during development from the Super Smash Bros. series and an iOS game called Slam Bots, in an effort to make a multiplayer version of that game. The game was self-funded by Lowe Bros. Studios for three years before launching a Kickstarter campaign on September 12, 2017 with a $25,000 funding goal. By the end of the campaign, the game had raised nearly $42,000.

The game was released for Windows on July 10, 2018. In December 2020, Lowe Bros. Studios announced development of a port for Nintendo Switch, which would include all characters. However, the company stated in July 2022 that development had halted on the game due to unspecified licensing issues.
