= Bit.Trip Void =

2009 video game

- Developer: Gaijin Games
- Publishers: Aksys Games (WiiWare); Gaijin Games (PC); QubicGames (Switch)
- Designers: Alex Neuse; Chris Osborn
- Artist: Mike Roush
- Composer: Nullsleep
- Series: Bit.Trip
- Platforms: Wii, Nintendo 3DS, Windows, Mac OS X, Nintendo Switch
- Release: WiiWare: JP: October 27, 2009; NA: November 23, 2009; PAL: March 5, 2010; Wii: NA: September 13, 2011; PAL: March 16, 2012; Nintendo 3DS: NA: September 13, 2011; EU: March 16, 2012; JP: July 10, 2013; Windows: WW: December 19, 2012; OS X: WW: January 30, 2013; Nintendo Switch: WW: December 25, 2020
- Genres: Bullet hell, Rhythm
- Modes: Single-player, Multiplayer

Bit.Trip Void, marketed as BIT.TRIP VOID, is an arcade-style bullet hell rhythm game developed by Gaijin Games and published by Aksys Games for the Wii's WiiWare download service. It was first released in Japan in 2009, and later in North America and PAL regions in 2009 and 2010, respectively. It was designed by Alex Neuse and Chris Osborn, while the visuals were designed by Mike Roush. While initially having what they now describe as "noisy" audio and visuals, they changed them to be more minimalistic to alleviate this, a decision which worked well with their minimalistic design for the HUD. Neuse designed it so that it could be open to interpretation by players, though stating that they intended it to delve into starring character Commander Video's psyche, and "what it means to have emotions and personal space."

It puts players in control of a void, and represents the end of Commander Video's first chapter. Players move the void around with the joystick of either the Classic Controller or the Nunchuk, attempting to collect all of the black squares that appear, causing the void to grow; however, if hit players hit a white square, the void will be reduced to its regular size. Players are also able to reduce their void in size to avoid the white blocks. It features a heavy emphasis on retro-styled visuals and audio, with the audio composed by electronic musician Nullsleep. It was followed by three more games in the series, all developed by Gaijin Games: Bit.Trip Runner, Bit.Trip Fate, and Bit.Trip Flux.

Bit.Trip Void was well-received both before and following its release; it currently holds aggregate scores of 79 and 80.08% at Metacritic and GameRankings, respectively. It was praised for its audio and visuals, as well as its unique concept and 8-bit style. However, the high level of difficulty was still a problem, with IGN citing how the game sometimes blends the black squares with a black background, as well as a lack of leaderboards, which both IGN and GameSpot deride. Video Gamer named it as one of their recommendations for the WiiWare service.

== Gameplay ==
Several scenes of gameplay in Bit.Trip Void. The ball that players control grows larger with each black dot collected and will shrink to its original size when a white dot is collected.

Players take control of a spherical black void while black and white squares come from all sides of the screen in a modern retro game described by GameSpot and IGN as a bullet hell game. It is controlled using either the Nunchuk or the Classic Controller for the Wii. Other versions use differing controls, with the console versions using the analogue stick. Void has three levels, with two checkpoints and a boss at the end. Before each level is a cutscene of the main character, Commander Video. Players are tasked with hitting every black square, while avoiding the white ones. With each black square hit, the void grows, and the player's combo grows with it, increasing the score more with every combo increase; however, if a white square hits the void, it will undo the void's growth and reset the combo to zero. The void may grow to great sizes, taking up most of the screen. Sometimes, the size will be too large to not hit a white square. This forces players to return to normal size by pushing a button, though without the added punishment of losing their combo. When the void returns to normal size, it will often be accompanied with a beat with squares coming out of the void.

Occasionally, players will obtain the ability to repel white squares, crucial for some parts. Hitting white squares or missing black squares too often will send the players' void to the netherworld; if they continue to fail to hit the black squares or dodge the white squares, they will get a game over, and will have to start over at the last checkpoint. After dying in or beating a level, players are shown their final score, and if it is a high score, will be able to enter it in. The HUD information such as the score and combo are shown in the background. Anywhere from two to four players may play at one time, with each player's void connected to each other, making any white squares that hit any void affect everyone.

== Development and release ==
Bit.Trip Void was developed by Gaijin Games and published by Aksys Games for the Wii's WiiWare digital download service. It was first released in Japan on October 27, 2009, and was later released in North America and PAL regions on November 23, 2009, and March 5, 2010, respectively. It was announced with an official website called explorethevoid.com. It was produced by Alex Neuse, illustrated by Mike Roush, and composed by electronic musician Nullsleep. Initially, it was to be controlled using the Wii Remote's pointer technology, where the void acts as the pointer's cursor and grows and shrinks based on how close the pointer is to the Wii's Sensor Bar. However, Neuse felt that it "completely destroyed the sense of meandering and flow they strove for"; additionally, the mechanic of adjusting size with the distance from the sensor bar was too complicated, leading to them using the Nunchuk. Because of its freer movement compared to that of its predecessors Bit.Trip Beat and Bit.Trip Core, it enabled Neuse to design levels to have patterns coming from all sides of the screen.

The visuals and audio were initially designed to be complex, but the developers found this to be too "noisy"; as a result, they made it more simplified and minimal. He described the current build as "black and white over a sunset background", versus the early build, which he describes as "midnight colors". Roush was not satisfied with the earlier design, feeling that nothing about it was exciting, leading to its current design. The game was designed without a HUD, an idea that they've had from the very beginning; the minimalistic design that they went with fit in well with this. While it had less time to complete, due to E3 2009, it was considered their easiest game to develop at the time. In discussing the underlying meanings behind Void, Neuse explains that Void "delve into his psyche, and what it means to have emotions and personal space. Not only what it means to have those things, but to use and abuse them." However, he noted that this was only their intention, and that he wanted it to be left up to interpretation by players. A Void-themed level was featured in the iOS release of Bit.Trip Beat. Bit.Trip Void was designated the end of a chapter of games consisting of itself and its predecessors; however, at its reveal, Gaijin Games stated "But as one chapter ends, another begins.." It was followed up by three more games, namely Bit.Trip Runner, Bit.Trip Fate, and Bit.Trip Flux.

The game was later bundled with the other five Bit.Trip games as Bit.Trip Complete for the Wii in 2011. A Nintendo Switch port released on December 25, 2020.

== Reception ==
=== Pre-release ===
Kotaku's Stephen Totilo called its controls the most comfortable in the series, also praising its graphics, sound, and for being the most "gamer-friendly". IGN's Levi Buchanan found himself "hooked" on Void after playing it at Penny Arcade Expo in 2009, citing the retro aesthetic used. GameSpot's Sophia Tong found it easy to play it for a long period of time due to its implementation of checkpoints, also calling it as engaging as the others.

=== Post-release ===
Reception

Aggregate scores
Aggregator	Score
GameRankings	80.08%
Metacritic	79/100

Review scores
Publication	Score
Eurogamer	8/10
IGN	7.0/10
Official Nintendo Magazine	8.2/10

Since its release, Bit.Trip Void has received generally positive reception, holding aggregate scores of 79 and 80.08% at Metacritic and GameRankings respectively. IGN's Daemon Hatfield praised the Atari 2600-like visuals and soundtrack, in particular the players' ability to contribute to it. And while he found the game's appearance stylish, he found it too difficult to track the black squares when the background fades to black. He also derided the lack of online leaderboards, commenting that "it is becoming less and less acceptable to overlook the most basic of online functionality." GameSpot's Lark Anderson praised Void for making the traditionally difficult more forgiving with the implementation of checkpoints and continues, as well as its "risk-versus-reward" mechanic, which he describes as a "refreshing spin" on the bullet hell genre. However, like Hatfield, he found fault in the lack of online leaderboards, adding that the number of levels is small.

Video Gamer's James Orry named it one of their WiiWare recommendations, particularly if readers are looking for something a "little different". Eurogamer's Kristan Reed described it as a "deeply unhinged voyage into the realms of chiptune rhythm-action." Reed, however, did describe it as being difficult, and that even with checkpoints, the game is a "rough ride". Kotaku's Mike Fahey called the backgrounds psychedelic, and praised Gaijin Games for creating "compelling modern games with 8-bit sensibilities." Destructoid's Stella Wong called it a stellar entry in the series, praising its atmosphere. She felt that the audio was less prominent than it was in Bit.Trip Core, comparing it to Rez. Official Nintendo Magazine described it as "Insanely hard retro magic." While NGamer found it to be a "one-trick pony", they called its idea "neat" and "well-executed".
