= Bit.Trip Runner =

2010 video game

- Developer: Gaijin Games
- Publishers: Aksys Games (Wii, 3DS); Gaijin Games (PC); QubicGames (Switch)
- Designer: Alex Neuse
- Series: Bit.Trip
- Platforms: Wii, Windows, Mac OS X, Nintendo 3DS, Linux, Nintendo Switch
- Release: WiiWare: PAL: May 14, 2010; NA: May 17, 2010; JP: September 14, 2010; Windows, OS X: WW: February 28, 2011; Wii: NA: September 13, 2011; PAL: March 16, 2012; Nintendo 3DS: NA: September 13, 2011; EU: March 16, 2012; JP: July 10, 2013; Linux: WW: December 13, 2011; Nintendo Switch: WW: December 25, 2020
- Genres: Platform, music, runner
- Mode: Single-player

Bit.Trip Runner (stylized as BIT.TRIP RUNNER) is an arcade-style rhythm game developed by Gaijin Games and published by Aksys Games for the Wii's WiiWare download service. It is the fourth game to be released in the Bit.Trip series of games, serving as the successor to Bit.Trip Beat, Bit.Trip Core and Bit.Trip Void, and as the predecessor to Bit.Trip Fate and Bit.Trip Flux. A remake called Bit.Trip ReRunner was released on September 19, 2023 for Windows, developed by Choice Provisions and Gamecraft Studios.

== Gameplay ==
Bit.Trip Runner is a 2D platformer in which the player takes control of Commander Video, the main protagonist of the Bit.Trip series who had appeared only during cut-scenes in the previous titles. The game is split into three worlds, known as "Impetus", "Tenacity" and "Triumph" respectively, each containing 11 stages and a boss encounter. In each level, Commander Video runs automatically from left to right. To complete a level, the player must input certain commands on the controller, including jumping, sliding and kicking, to avoid or destroy obstacles and enemies. If Commander Video is hit by any object, he is immediately warped back to the beginning of the level and starts running again.

During levels, the player obtains power-ups that upgrade the score multiplier, starting at 'Hyper' and progressing through 'Mega', 'Super', 'Ultra', and finally 'Extra'. As these multipliers are gained, the background music becomes more advanced accordingly, with new melodies being added and modern instrumentation layered on top. Commander Video is also able to collect gold bars distributed through the course of the levels - if all the gold bars in a level are acquired, the player is given access to a short bonus stage based on Pitfall, the famous Atari 2600 game programmed by David Crane.

== Development ==
As the fourth of six Bit.Trip games, Runner was designed as an attempt at "fleshing out the BIT.TRIP universe into a fuller, richer place by showing players what exactly the world looked like: an optimistic and colorful place while at the same time dreary and hostile." The game makes a number of notable changes to the design conventions of the other Bit.Trip games, like a more traditional playable character and a structure consisting of many smaller levels rather than three long ones.

In an early version of the game, Commander Video had a wider arsenal of abilities, some of which were callbacks to Core and Void, but designer Alex Neuse decided to remove the more complicated moves after observing that playtesters were becoming overwhelmed.

The game's soundtrack combines 8-bit music with contemporary genres such as techno and electronica. The independent chiptune band Anamanaguchi contributed some songs to the soundtrack. Meanwhile, to fit with the use of Commander Video as a character, artist Mike Roush created the graphics with a heavy emphasis on eyeballs, providing the locations with greater personality.

The game was later bundled with the other five Bit.Trip games as Bit.Trip Complete for the Wii in 2011. A Nintendo Switch port was released on December 25, 2020.

== Reception ==
Reception

Aggregate score
| Aggregator | Score |
|---|---|
| Metacritic | WII: 76/100 |

Review scores
| Publication | Score |
|---|---|
| GameSpot | 8.5/10 |
| IGN | 7.0/10 |
| Nintendo World Report | 8.5/10 |

Upon its initial release on WiiWare, Bit.Trip Runner was met with mostly positive reviews. Praised for its aesthetics, catchy soundtrack, and addictive gameplay, the game is seen as an extraordinarily unforgiving title. At the 2011 Independent Games Festival, it won the award for Excellence in Visual Art, and was an honorable mention for the Seumas McNally Grand Prize and the Excellence in Audio awards.

== Sequels and remake ==
A sequel called Bit.Trip Presents... Runner2: Future Legend of Rhythm Alien was released on PlayStation Network, Xbox Live Arcade and Wii U Nintendo eShop on February–March 2013, and released on Steam on February 26, 2013. It features 120 new levels, 8 playable characters and updated HD graphics.

Another sequel, simply named Runner3, was released for the Nintendo Switch, PlayStation 4 and on Steam in 2018, with planned release for the Xbox One.

A remake with revamped visuals and music, titled Bit.Trip Rerunner, was released for Windows on Steam on September 19, 2023. The remake includes a new "Runner Maker," allowing players to make their own custom levels. Alongside the original campaign, the remake also offers a completely new set of levels, which integrate the two cut mechanics that referenced Core and Void, as well as levels based on music tracks from the rest of the series. The remake also adds features from the other Runner games - checkpoints and the dance input. In February 2026, a kickstarter was launched for a potential Nintendo Switch 2 version of the game.
