= Bit.Trip Complete =

2011 video game

- Developer: Gaijin Games
- Publishers: NA: Aksys Games; PAL: Rising Star Games
- Series: Bit.Trip
- Platform: Wii
- Release: NA: September 13, 2011; PAL: March 16, 2012
- Genres: Action, music
- Modes: Single-player, multiplayer

Bit.Trip Complete is a compilation of six games in the Bit.Trip series, including Bit.Trip Beat (2009), Bit.Trip Core (2009), Bit.Trip Void (2009), Bit.Trip Runner (2010), Bit.Trip Fate (2010), and Bit.Trip Flux (2011).

== Development ==
It was developed by Gaijin Games for the Wii and published by Aksys in North America and Rising Star Games in the PAL region.

== Contents ==
Included with the game is a music CD, titled Bit.Trip Soundtrack Sampler that contains pieces from all six games.

The game also includes 20 extra "challenge levels" for each game, as well as bonus content related to the production of the games. These levels are completely new but are shorter than the already included levels.

== Reception ==
Reception

Aggregate score
Aggregator	Score
Metacritic	84/100

Review scores
Publication	Score
Destructoid	10/10
Electronic Gaming Monthly	8.5/10
Game Informer	8/10
GameSpot	8/10
GameTrailers	8.5/10
GameZone	8/10
IGN	8/10
Nintendo Life	9/10
Nintendo Power	9/10
Nintendo World Report	9/10
Official Nintendo Magazine	86%
411Mania	6/10
Metro	8/10

The game received "favorable" reviews according to the review aggregation website Metacritic.
