= Tharsis (video game) =

2016 video game

- Developer: Choice Provisions
- Publisher: Choice Provisions
- Designer: Zach Gage
- Engine: Unity
- Platforms: Windows; Mac OS X; PlayStation 4; Nintendo Switch
- Release: WW: January 12, 2016
- Genre: Strategy
- Mode: Single-player

Tharsis is a 2016 strategy video game developed and published by Choice Provisions. It was released worldwide in January 2016 for Windows and Mac OS X through the download service Steam, as well as for PlayStation 4, and later in April 2020 for the Nintendo Switch. The game follows a team of astronauts on the first crewed mission to Mars, in order to track down a signal that is apparently extraterrestrial in origin. After being hit by a micrometeorite storm, they must resort to desperate measures to survive the trip.

A turn-based game played using simulated virtual dice, the player controls four characters, attempting to fix problems with the ship and keep the crew alive each turn by managing their dice cache, health, and stress level. Developed by designer Zach Gage and the indie development studio Choice Provisions, the game was created to mimic a board game experience.

Critics were polarized on whether the gameplay was deeply strategic or overly dependent on random chance, and the game was more poorly received by video game reviewers than streamers, board game players or other developers.

== Gameplay ==
Tharsis allows players to control four astronauts with unique jobs and abilities inside a heavily damaged spacecraft, the Iktomi. The game lasts for 10 in-game weeks, during which time the player must attempt to reach Mars without any of the crew perishing. At the start of each week, at least two parts of the ship will have a problem in need of repair, and which, if left alone, can damage the ship's hull integrity or crewmember health. The player can click each astronaut to deploy them to a certain module for that turn and repair them using the astronaut's dice. If a problem is not repaired after all crew members move, the negative effect will trigger.

The player, using the Captain character, attempts to put out a fire by rolling dice.

Each astronaut has their own health points, stress meter, and dice cache. Every roll of the dice decreases the character's maximum dice by one unless replenished with food. Problems can only be repaired by adding enough dice to match the indicated number. However, there are several types of hazards that can hinder dice rolls, which can only be avoided by gaining "assists". There are a maximum of three assists at a time, and one is consumed to prevent a hazard. Besides using the dice to repair, each room has a bonus that can be activated by rolling a certain dice, or combination of them. Extra dice can also be invested into research, allowing beneficial abilities to be used at a later time.

At the end of each week, crew can work on side projects that the player can choose from. Usually, these side projects have both a positive and negative effect. The higher the crew's stress, the worse the negative effects, and if crew are allowed to go insane, they will work on a solo side project with a more drastic effect than usual, and may harm the other crew. The crew can also eat food, if any, during this time. Cannibalism can be used as a last resort if the crew runs out of food. The player can choose to feed the body of a crew member who died in the beginning of the game to various surviving crew. However, this has significant negative consequences to the characters' stress levels and maximum health, and affects the game's ending.

== Plot ==
The game is set in the near future, where Earth has received a mysterious signal from Tharsis on Mars. With scientists believing it to be a sign of extraterrestrial life, the Iktomi is built, and its six crewmembers are sent to Mars to investigate the anomaly. Depending on the characters used, the voice of the commander will be either male or female. However, halfway through their mission, the ship is suddenly hit by a micrometeorite storm that kills two crew members, Mapiya Musgrave and J. Cross, and destroys the Pantry where the food is stored. With limited food supplies and crew, disasters start running rampant throughout the ship, and the astronauts are forced to constantly fight to survive. Despite still being able to contact Mission Control, they are unable to turn back home.

During the journey, the crew deciphers data sent from Tharsis and realizes that it shows what seems to be an exact copy of the crew of the Iktomi who are in dire straits. Unsure of what to make of this data, they manage to survive until they reach Mars and launch the capsule, while the Iktomi remains in orbit and is destroyed. The crew tracks down the signal and comes across an alien artifact. Suddenly, the artifact flashes with a bright light. If one or more of the Iktomi's crew is dead, the artifact compels them to detach their helmets and suffocate. One of the crew manages to survive long enough to send a distress call, which the artifact sends back in time, creating a causal loop. If the entire crew makes it safely to Mars, the commander declares the mission accomplished, but advises Earth not to expect survivors. One of the crew members manages to pick up a rock and throw it at the artifact before it can activate, destroying it in a massive explosion. Mars is seen covered in a layer of snow, implying the planet can now support human life.

== Development ==
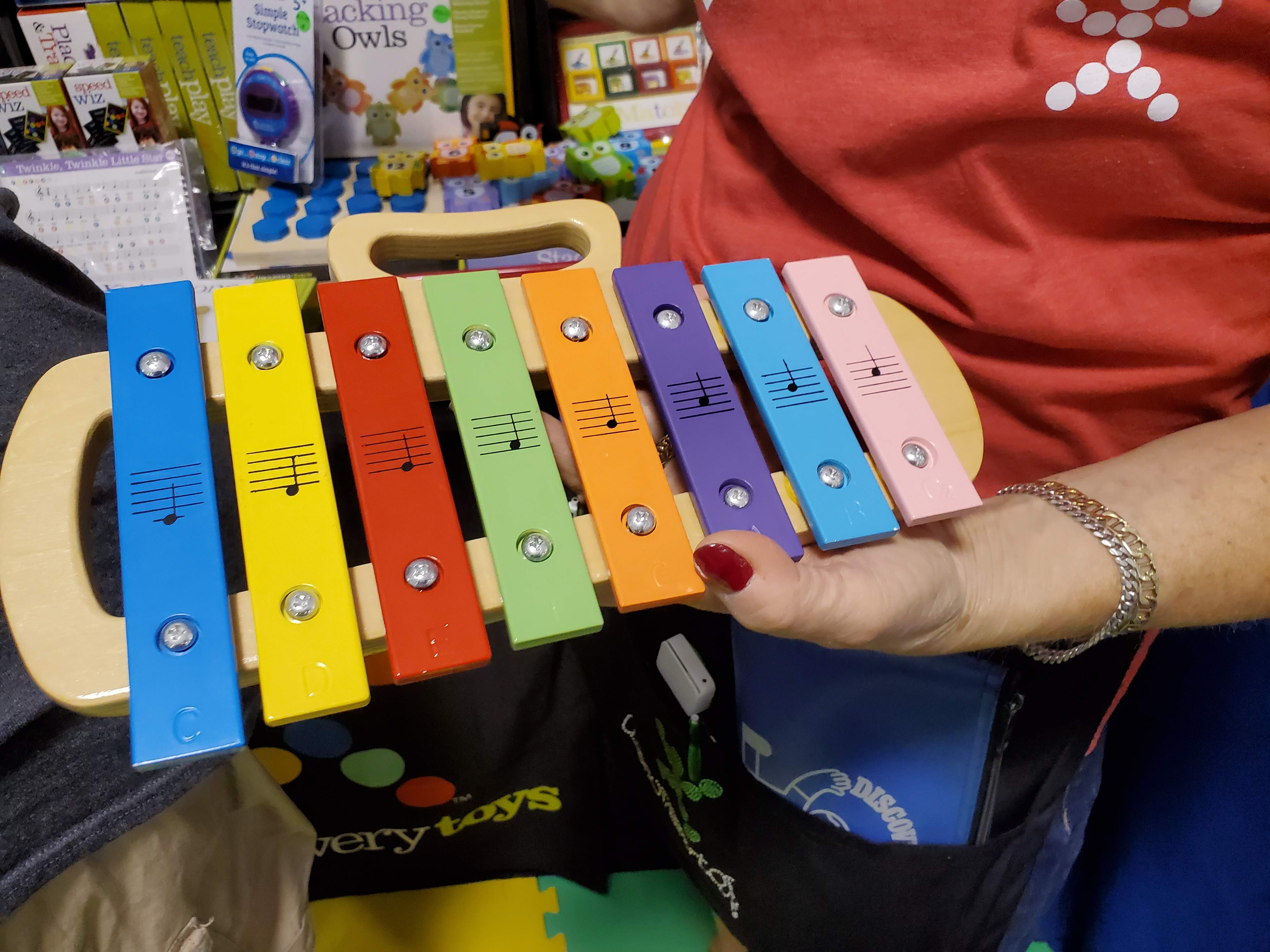
The color scheme of Tharsis was based on that of a toy xylophone.

According to an interview with Mike Roush, co-founder of Choice Provisions, the original inspiration for Tharsis was the story of the whaling ship Essex, which was sunk by a whale, forcing the crew to resort to desperate attempts to stay alive, including cannibalism. The game was also inspired by the Apollo 13 mission and the fact that they were forced to use unusual household items to maintain the air scrubber.

The game was also created out of Choice Provisions's desire not to be "typecast" as a studio that only developed the Bit.Trip series or worked in an 8-bit retro style. Tharsis's art style was based on 70's sci-fi designs such as those used in Space: 1999 and UFO, but which was updated to be realistic in a modern-day context. The pastel color scheme was derived from that of a children's xylophone. The soundtrack consists of tracks from the album Half Age EP by Weval.

The dice mechanic was used due to a perceived resurgence in the popularity of board games, as well as due to the uniqueness of the concept in video games. A challenge that was noted was the high learning curve of the game, which caused people to abandon it instead of watching the tutorial or delving deeper into the strategic mechanics. The game was balanced to provide a degree of challenge such that players could not beat the game on their first try, but required repeated attempts to be able to get further and further. The game's development took approximately two years to complete.

== Reception ==
Reception

Aggregate score
| Aggregator | Score |
|---|---|
| Metacritic | PC: 61/100; PS4: 65/100; NS: 58/100 |

Review scores
| Publication | Score |
|---|---|
| Destructoid | 6.5/10 |
| GameSpot | 6/10 |
| IGN | 4.8/10 |
| PC Gamer (US) | 44/100 |
| Play | 45/100 |

Tharsis received "mixed or average" reviews according to Metacritic, a review aggregator. Amongst positive reviews, Matt Peckham of Time called the game "ingenious" and "brutally exacting". Reviewer Andrei Dumitrescu of Softpedia cited "interesting mechanics" and "a lot of replayability", despite the high difficulty, and that the game showed how humans persevere in the face of hopeless odds. Brian Dumlao of Worthplaying scored the game moderately, praising the "lovingly rendered" graphics of the ship despite the "generic" characters, and saying the music was "done very well", though mentioning that the game was "not for everyone", and that people who weren't comfortable with losing far more often than they would win would be unhappy with the game.

A common point of criticism was that success was perceived to be overly based on random chance. Patrick Hancock of Destructoid praised the game's graphics as "wonderful", aside from the faces of the crew members, but criticized the game for relying "too much on dice rolls", leading to the feeling that winning is too dependent on luck and "destroy[ing] one's interest in trying again". Rob Zacny of IGN stated that he felt that he had gotten lucky when things went well, instead of doing "something clever". Tyler Wilde of PC Gamer called the game highly "dependent on chance" and suggested that the difficulty varies widely depending on how good your dice rolls are for that particular playthrough.

According to designer Zach Gage, Tharsis was one of the most critically divisive he ever worked on. The game received an overall negative response from publications that were video game focused, while it received a more positive response from streamers, board game players, and developers. He believes this is due to the fact that games of chance are usually used as a lazy shortcut to make things harder, or to take the player's money in mobile games, which caused the gameplay of Tharsis to be overlooked.
