= Runner3 =

2018 video game

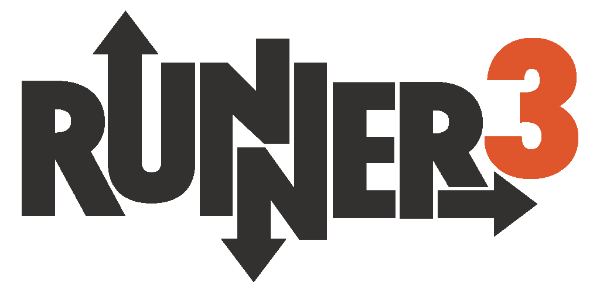
- Developer: Choice Provisions
- Publishers: Choice Provisions; Nicalis (physical)
- Composers: Matthew Harwood; Stemage
- Series: Bit.Trip
- Engine: Unity
- Platforms: Nintendo Switch, Windows, macOS, PlayStation 4
- Release: Windows, macOS, Switch: WW: May 22, 2018; PlayStation 4: WW: November 13, 2018
- Genres: Platform, rhythm
- Mode: Single-player

Runner3 is a rhythm platform game developed by Choice Provisions. A sequel to Bit.Trip Presents... Runner2: Future Legend of Rhythm Alien, Runner3 is part of the Bit.Trip series, starring the character CommanderVideo. The game was released on May 22, 2018 on Microsoft Windows, macOS, and Nintendo Switch, and was released on the PlayStation 4 on November 13, 2018.

== Gameplay ==
Runner3 is a rhythm platform game in which players take control of CommanderVideo, the protagonist of the Bit.Trip series. Similar to the previous two Runner games, CommanderVideo runs forward automatically and the player controls actions such as jumping, sliding, and kicking to overcome obstacles and collect items. Many of the game objects are encountered in sync with each level's background music, encouraging the player to keep the beat while playing through each level.

There are optional collectible goods scattered across every level, the most common ones being gold bars. There is a set amount of gold in each level, and each bar collected increases the player's score. One of the more important collectibles is the Mode-Ups, a less common object across all three games in the series that progresses the level's music while also allowing the player to attain a higher score. The five modes in Runner3 (Hyper, Mega, Super, Ultra, and Extra) remain the same as in the previous games, with the player starting at Hyper and increasing one level per Mode-Up item collected. Notably, in previous Runner games, the Mode-Up appeared as a red 3D plus; in Runner3, it appears as a blue boombox. Runner3 also includes a completely new collectible, Gems, which can be found on an alternate, more difficult path that usually forces the player to skip gold bars, requiring multiple runs per level for the player to get full completion. Each Gem can be collected only once and is used to unlock cosmetic items.

Runner3 introduces new mechanics such as rideable vehicles and the ability to double jump. While previous Runner games split levels into different routes by allowing the player to either jump onto a vertical platform or slide under it, Runner3 makes use of alternate paths that branch off to the side, letting the player select the path to take simply by inputting a direction. The game also features side-quests, called Hero Quests, in which CommanderVideo stops to interact with non-playable characters that, for example, might task him with collecting specific items in certain levels. Completing Hero Quests unlocks new playable characters; in addition to past characters from the Bit.Trip series, Runner3 includes playable versions of the Shovel Knight character from the game of the same name, Eddie Riggs from Brütal Legend, and the Narrator, a caricature of voice actor Charles Martinet.

There are 27 main levels (each containing many branching paths, collectibles, and secrets), and three main worlds (Foodland, Spookyland, and Machineland) with differently themed scenery between each world.

=== Retro challenges ===
Each game in the Runner series has had retro challenges as additional content for players looking for additional, more difficult gameplay. In BIT.TRIP RUNNER and Runner2, the retro challenges are smaller levels based on older video games, and run on the same core mechanics as the main game, having only gold bars to collect. Runner3's retro challenges are much more different than the regular game, giving the player full control over CommanderVideo's movement, making it play as a more traditional platformer. Each retro level has five "Gildan Coins", which can be traded in for extra cosmetics at an in-game shop.

== Development ==
Runner3 was developed by video game development studio Choice Provisions. One focal point of Runner3's design was creating a rewarding and enjoyable experience for playing on any difficulty. Choice Provisions' co-founder Alex Neuse emphasized that many games rewarded only hardcore players and offered a lesser experience for playing on lower difficulties. Voice actor Charles Martinet reprised his narration role in Runner3 and had a playable appearance.

== Release ==
Runner3 was announced in September 2016. In February 2017, Nintendo revealed that Runner3 would launch on the Nintendo Switch console in the latter half of 2017. However, in August 2017, Choice Provisions announced that the game would not release until 2018. A physical version of Runner3 was announced by Nicalis on December 13, 2017. It was released on Steam and Nintendo Switch on May 22, 2018.

Following the release, Choice Provisions announced upgrades to the game, which will include such features as enemy density, more checkpoints, stair assist, bonk counter, and gold bars and gems.

== Reception ==
Reception

Aggregate score
Aggregator	Score
Metacritic	NS: 73/100; PC: 78/100

Review scores
Publication	Score
GameSpot	7/10
IGN	7/10

The video game aggregator site Metacritic gave the Nintendo Switch version a 73/100, while the PC version got a 78/100.

Kevin Tucker of Shacknews, who reviewed the Steam version of the game, gave it 9 out of 10. Seth Macy of IGN criticized the game's "outdated" graphics and repetitiveness of levels, giving it a 7 out of 10.
