= Woah Dave! =

2014 video game

- Developer: MiniVisions
- Publisher: MiniVisions
- Designer: Jason Cirillo
- Composer: The Full Grown Men
- Platforms: iOS, Windows, OS X, Linux, Nintendo 3DS, PlayStation Vita, PlayStation 4, Wii U, Playdate (console)
- Release: iOS, Windows, OS X, Linux, Nintendo 3DS, NA: October 30, 2014; PlayStation Vita: NA: January 6, 2015; EU: January 7, 2015; JP: November 4, 2015; PlayStation 4: NA: March 31, 2015; EU: April 1, 2015; JP: November 4, 2015; Wii U: NA: August 20, 2015; Apple TV: NA: November 2, 2015; Panic Playdate: NA: September 1, 2026
- Genre: Platform
- Modes: Single-player, multiplayer

Woah Dave! is a platform video game developed and published by MiniVisions for iOS, Microsoft Windows, Nintendo 3DS, PlayStation 4, and PlayStation Vita. The game was released on iOS, Windows, and Nintendo 3DS on October 30, 2014. It was released for the PlayStation Vita on January 6, 2015. A PlayStation 4 version was released on March 31, 2015. Said PS4 version of Woah Dave! was released with two new levels, six new characters, boss battles, new enemy types, UFOs players can hitch a ride on, other hidden Easter eggs and the ability to play the original version of the game. The added features were patched onto Woah Dave! on all of the platforms it was released on.

A graphically-simplified version of Woah Dave! (displayed in black-and-white) was released on the Panic Playdate (console) on September 1, 2026.

== Gameplay ==
Gameplay takes place on a single screen level where players play as the titular Dave. Dave must defeat a variety of enemies by throwing either eggs or skulls at them, however holding onto either of these will kill Dave after a while. The goal of the game is to rack up as many coins as possible, which is done by successfully killing monsters. Monsters evolve if they fall into the lava at the bottom of the screen and the more evolved a monster gets the more coins Dave gets for killing them.

== Reception ==
Reception

Aggregate scores
Aggregator	Score
GameRankings	82% (iOS); 78% (3DS); 68% (Vita)
Metacritic	82/100 (iOS); 73/100 (Vita)

Review scores
Publication	Score
Destructoid	8.5/10 (3DS)
TouchArcade	4/5 (iOS)
Gamezebo	5/5 (iOS)

Woah Dave! received positive reviews from critics. On GameRankings, the iOS version holds an 82%, while the Nintendo 3DS version has a score of 78%. Metacritic gives the iOS version a score of 82 out of 100. Reviewing for Destructoid, Jonathan Holmes gave the game an 8.5 out of 10, and wrote: "There's hours of arcade fun, strange charm, and game design science here. If you can get past the game's deceptively simple surface and are content to challenge yourself after the game stops providing new carrots to chase, you'll find Woah Dave! to be well worth your pennies." Gamezebo reviewer Jim Squires gave the iOS version a perfect 5 out of 5, writing that "Woah Dave! is the grunge rock of video games, and I'm loving every minute of it".

== Sequel ==
Choice Provisions announced a sequel titled Space Dave!, scheduled for and later released in Q1 2018. It released on the Nintendo Switch in 2018.
