= Bit.Trip Beat =

2009 video game

- Mock box art made by Gaijin Games for Bit.Trip Beat
- Developer: Gaijin Games
- Publishers: Aksys Games (Wii & 3DS, North America and Europe); Arc System Works (Wii & 3DS, Japan); Gaijin Games (PC, Android); Namco Bandai (iOS) QubicGames (Switch)
- Designer: Alex Neuse
- Series: Bit.Trip
- Platforms: Wii, iOS, Windows, Mac OS X, Nintendo 3DS, Android, Linux, Nintendo Switch
- Release: WiiWare: NA: March 16, 2009; JP: April 28, 2009; PAL: May 1, 2009; iOS: NA: September 30, 2010; Windows, Mac OS X: NA: November 2, 2010; Wii: NA: September 13, 2011; PAL: March 16, 2012; Nintendo 3DS: NA: September 13, 2011; EU: March 16, 2012; JP: July 10, 2013; Android, Linux: WW: August 15, 2012; Nintendo Switch: WW: December 25, 2020
- Genres: Action, Music
- Modes: Single-player, multiplayer

Bit.Trip Beat, marketed as BIT.TRIP BEAT, is an arcade-style music video game developed by Gaijin Games and published by Aksys Games for the Wii's WiiWare download service. It was released in 2009 in North America, and released in Japan and PAL regions in the same year. It was later released for the Windows and Mac OS X through the download service Steam in 2010, while Namco Bandai published it for iOS on iPod Touch, iPhone, and iPad in both Bit.Trip Beat and Bit.Trip Beat HD versions. Android and Linux versions debuted in the Humble Android Bundle 3.

The WiiWare version is controlled by tilting the Wii Remote while holding it on its side. Players are placed in control of a paddle on the left side of the screen which, much like Pong, is tasked with deflecting squares that are coming from the right side. Each successful hit creates a sound effect that contributes to the background music, which was composed by an anonymous composer at Petrified Productions. A soundtrack was eventually released for the game's music, including some songs by micromusican Bit Shifter who composed the Title Screen and Credits music.

Since its release, Bit.Trip Beat received generally positive reception, holding an 80 and 80.15% from Metacritic and GameRankings, respectively. Wired named it the fifth best Wii game of 2009, while IGN named it the eighth best WiiWare game. The most common praise for it was what multiple reviewers describe as addictive gameplay, stylish visuals, and a great soundtrack. However, certain reviewers criticized its short game length and high level of difficulty. It has spawned five sequels since, including Bit.Trip Core, Bit.Trip Void, Bit.Trip Runner, Bit.Trip Fate, and Bit.Trip Flux; with the exception of Flux, which plays as a reversed version of Beat, each game has a unique gameplay style to the last.

== Gameplay ==
Several scenes of gameplay from Bit.Trip Beat. The player controls the paddle on the left while projectiles approach from the right in varying patterns. The score and its multiplier are shown on the top and bottom left of the screen.

Bit.Trip Beat puts players in control of a paddle that reflects differently sized and coloured beats, similar to Pong, as they come from the right side of the screen toward the left. It is controlled by holding the Wii Remote sideways and tilting it toward and away from the player to make the paddle go up and down. Gameplay takes place in one of three different phases: Transition, Descent, and Growth, with each phase more difficult than the last. Before each phase a cutscene of the character Commander Video is shown. Phases are split into several parts, with each part ending with multiple rainbow-coloured beats. At the end of each phase is a boss. Either through getting a game over or beating the phase, players will then have their final scores tallied.

When the beats collide with the paddle, they make a noise, contributing to the background music. Each successful deflection earns players a set score. Beats may also move in strange patterns, such as beats that bounce back after being deflected or beats that pause for a moment. If the paddle misses a beat, it will deplete a meter on the lower screen slightly; if the meter is completely depleted, the background will change to black and the beats and paddle white. If the meter depletes again, players will lose and have to start the phase over. In order to get out of this, players must fill up a meter at the top of the screen before the lower meter empties again, bringing them to normal. If players fill it up again, it will bring them into a new style, where the music, graphics, and sound effects are changed, with the score per each successful deflection doubled. Each time the meter is filled up at this point, the score multiplier increases.

Special beats will, if hit, modify players' paddle temporarily in some way; some will make the paddle tiny, rewarding players for meeting a threshold of beats hit while in this form, or doubling paddles to prepare players for a sequence of beats that cannot be hit without two paddles. If the lower meter empties on this screen, players will return to the normal mode. Bit.Trip Beat also features a multi-player mode, allowing anywhere from two to four players to play cooperatively, all paddles working together to deflect the beats. The four player mode modifies the paddles to make them smaller to prevent the game from becoming too easy.

The iOS release of Bit.Trip Beat has several new features. This includes leaderboards, downloadable levels based on other titles in the Bit.Trip series, achievements, and the ability to either use the built-in accelerometer or the iOS series' touch screens. Its multi-player mode allows for both off and online multi-player. Similar to the iOS version, the Windows and Mac OS X versions feature leaderboards and achievements. This version adds an easy mode and the ability to post high score data to either Facebook or Twitter.

=== Story ===
The first cutscene in BIT.TRIP BEAT introduces us to Commander Video, the protagonist of the BIT.TRIP series. He is seen coming to life after absorbing some colorful pixels known as "beats." The first level, TRANSITION, begins next to a giant, pulsing blue planet. A meteor emerges from the planet, travels across the vast emptiness of space, and eventually enters another planet. The second level, DESCENT, begins here. DESCENT is a roller coaster ride down into the lava-filled depths of the world, ending with the camera diving down into the lava to finish the stage.

As all this is happening in the background, the player is bouncing beats (the game's form of Pong balls) off of a paddle in a Pong-style rhythm game. The gameplay flows in perfect timing to the beat of the music- the player (and Commander Video) both rely on the music and help create it.

The backgrounds can be interpreted in 2 different ways; Commander Video's soul has emerged from the Ether and transitioning from the ethereal world to the physical world, or Commander Video's conception, with the journey from the blue planet to the lava-filled depths of the other planet representing the sperm's journey to the egg.

The third level, GROWTH, is a bit easier to understand. In the background, a brain is slowly coming together. About halfway through the level, after developing a pair of eyes, it begins to fly around and look at all sorts of Earthly objects: houses, trees, owls, pyramids, trains, and more. This is Commander Video entering the physical world and perceiving reality for the first time.

After the credits in BEAT, Commander Video is in complete darkness. He sees a light-filled room in the distance with other Commander Videos in it. He approaches the room, is overcome by light, and declares, "I AM ONLY A MAN!". Commander Video is born.

== Development and release ==
Bit.Trip Beat was developed by Gaijin Games and initially published by Aksys Games. It was designed by Alex Neuse, its art by Mike Roush, and its programming by Chris Osborn. Their publishing agreement with Aksys was formed due to Neuse's personal relationship with its president, Akibo Shieh, with whom the two of them had wanted to work on a game together before. Despite the amicable relationship with Aksys, the budget and development time were less than they would have wanted, though they put up with it due to their good relationship and the challenge of developing with those limits. Because of being only three people, the developers had to do more than what they normally would have to. Before its reveal, Gaijin released a teaser on IGN. Its title was originally 8-Bit Beat, though this was changed to Bit.Trip Beat. Early on, the developers could only afford one development kit, causing them to have to interrupt each other's work to use it. One of the first ideas made for the game was to give it an Atari 2600 art style.

It was initially proposed as "Pong with music". While described as being "not a big selling point" by Roush, the enthusiasm given off by Neuse convinced him to stay and work with him on it. Roush attributes the development of Bit.Trip Beat on WiiWare over competing services Xbox Live Arcade and PlayStation Network due to both coming off from the development of a Nintendo DS game before it and Neuse's Nintendo fanboyism. Its development time spanned three and a half months. He explains that it was easier to switch from the DS to Wii than it would be to switch to an entirely different company's platform. Neuse noted music video game Rez for inspiring Beat, calling it one of his favourite games of all time. The developers designed its controls with the intent of hearkening back to the era of "spinner controls" traditionally used in paddle games. Initially, they used several different kinds of controls, including having players control it with the d-pad, the analog stick, and by pointing the Wii Remote at the screen. However, they eventually settled on holding the controller sideways and tilting it. Boss battles were added near the end of development; while Neuse did not want to feature them despite his love for the video game trope, he felt that the game could benefit from them. However, due to the short time spent creating them, he finds them to feel rushed, even though they add to the game. Neuse explains that, while wanting the game to remain open to interpretation, Beat shows CommanderVideo's journey from the ethereal to the corporeal, ending with CommanderVideo becoming aware of himself and saying "I am only a man."

Near the end of development, the developers realized that they had mistakenly forgotten to localize the game, including error messages, such as those telling if save data has been corrupted. As such, they believe that they diminished its accessibility in other regions as a result. A bug, interpreted to be intentional, prevented the game from saving unless players achieve a high score. This only affected the North American version, as the other versions came out after it was fixed. A traditional patch was not easily accomplished on the WiiWare service, which Game Set Watch speculates drove them to their method of fixing it, which included putting up two save files that included high scores for the first two levels, thereby unlocking the third level.

=== Audio ===
Originally, the audio was intended to be entirely chiptune; however, they realized that they should make the music more appealing to more people, making them change the style to simply chiptune-inspired. They outsourced the music to noted micromusician Bit Shifter. Bit.Shifter used Atari 2600 and Nintendo Entertainment System samples to compose the songs. Gaijin Games released the soundtrack for Bit.Trip Beat, which contains ten songs. While given a limited release initially, it was eventually given wide release on services such as Amazon MP3, iTunes, eMusic, and others.

=== Promotion and release ===
It was published by Aksys Games for the WiiWare on March 16, 2009, in North America and May 1, 2009, in PAL regions. Arc System Works published it in Japan on April 28, 2009. It was released for iOS in North America on September 30, 2010, where it was published by Namco Bandai. The iOS release was accompanied by an HD version of it for the same platform. Aksys also published it for Microsoft Windows and Mac OS X through the Steam service on November 2, 2010, in North America. Because they had no money for marketing, they launched a viral marketing campaign, which consisted of the above-mentioned teaser video, screenshots, and a CommanderVideo web site, all of which were well-received; however, according to Neuse, the hype for the game died down too far before the game's release, which he feels hurt its sales potential. While a release for the Xbox 360's Xbox Live Arcade and the PlayStation 3's PlayStation Network has been mentioned as possible in the future by the creators, they noted that it was difficult to accomplish.

Artist Mike Terpstra created two posters for the game, depicting Commander Video standing above a city. Bit.Trip Beat has been featured as part of a series of videos made by Nintendo called "Developer's Voice", which shares "in-game footage and insight who worked on the title". After the release of the first demo of Bit.Trip Beat for WiiWare, Gaijin Games CEO Alex Neuse claimed that the demo brought sales of the game up to their initial projections, later claiming that it needs to be played for players to understand it. A demo was released for the iOS version titled Bit.Trip Beat Blitz. During a Steam sale, Bit.Trip Beat was sold in the Indie Pulse Pack for $5.00, which included Audiosurf, Beat Hazard, Rhythm Zone, and The Polynomial. It was released on sale for $1.99 for the iOS launch. For Halloween in 2010, Namco Bandai dropped the prices of both Bit.Trip Beat and Bit.Trip Beat HD to $0.99 each on the iOS. The Windows and Mac OS X versions of Bit.Trip Beat were available for 10% off of $9.99 for the first week of its release.

The game was later bundled with the other five Bit.Trip games as Bit.Trip Complete for the Wii in 2011. It was also released as a Nintendo Switch port on December 25, 2020.

== Reception ==
Reception

Aggregate score
Aggregator	Score
Metacritic	(iOS) 75/100 (NS) 73/100

Review scores
Publication	Score
Destructoid	(WII) 9/10
Eurogamer	(WII) 7/10
GameSpot	(WII) 7.5/10
GamesRadar+	(WII) 4/5
IGN	(PC) 7.5/10
Nintendo Life	(NS) 9/10
Nintendo World Report	(NS) 7/10
Pocket Gamer	(iOS) 3.5/5

=== Pre-release ===
Ars Technica's Ben Kuchera noted it for being a quality title on the WiiWare service, which he states has been lacking in quality titles. He praised the trailer as exciting, while anticipating that it will be a "joy to play." Kotaku's Mike Fahey commented that it looked like a "blast to play." IGN's Steve Butts commented that while its combination of Pong-like gameplay and rhythmic gameplay could result in people referring to it as "Pong Pong Revolution", it was hard not to be "captivated, tested and utterly exhausted" by it.

=== WiiWare release ===
Pong was commonly cited by both the developers and critics as an inspiration for Bit.Trip Beat.

Since its release for WiiWare, Bit.Trip Beat has received generally positive reception, holding aggregate scores of 80/100 and 80.15% on Metacritic and GameRankings, respectively. GameSpot's Lark Anderson praised it for its addictiveness, music, and visuals; however, he criticized the number of levels, lack of online leaderboards, and for a confusing premise. Destructoid's Jonathan Holmes called it one of his favourite games of 2009. IGN's Mark Bozon described the gameplay as basic, but fun. He also praised the aesthetic quality of the game, describing the music as "extremely well-composed and complex" and the graphics for successfully achieving an old school style with its visuals. He also named it one of the 15 best WiiWare games. Wired's Gus Mastrapa named it his fifth favourite Wii game of 2009, calling it "one of the biggest surprises of the year", calling it "hard as hell". It was well received by Official Nintendo Magazine's Simon Bramble, who described it as a "fresh take on Pong" and praising its value and aesthetics. However, he noted its few levels left them wanting, even though they were large and unique.

Edge called it "short and difficult", though praising the developers for its use of "rhythm and conditioning to such powerful effect." They also noted that the game could have improved if the three levels were broken up into several more smaller segments. In MTV Multiplayer's review of one of its sequels Bit.Trip Flux, editor Jason Cipriano noted that while good, it was too difficult. Eurogamer's Simon Parkin described it as a "brisk, radiant creation" as well as a "nostalgic celebration". However, he did feel that Gaijin was "struggling" to come up with ways to increase the difficulty by the third phase, citing a unique type of beat that obscured the screen to an extent with their "flair". NGamer's Nick Ellis called it a "superb reinvention of Pong" and "unashamedly retro". While also praising the music and addictiveness, they criticized its high level of difficulty and eye strain that it may cause.

IGN's Lucas M. Thomas named it the eighth best WiiWare game, noting the fact that Pong creator Ralph Baer had played Bit.Trip Beat as evidence of its quality. He also compared it to Nintendo's Art Style series, calling it addictive and a good value, but also brief. IGN also featured it as a part of their "WiiWare Showcase" series, describing it as a "quick trip to a catchy musical game." Authors Jeff and Steve Fulton noted Bit.Trip Beat as a good example of a "post-retro game". They later note that it isn't appropriate to call it Pong, as while it shares some elements, it is very different. They also noted that, sans the visual and audio enhancements, it succeeds as a post-retro game as being an idea that could have been accomplished on the Atari 2600, but with the rhythmic premise, would make it impossible back in the day. Bit.Trip Beat was awarded with "The Michael Jackson Award for Best Video Game Music" by PC World, praising the game's use of sound effects to enhance the music. By the first half of 2009, Destructoid's Chad Concelmo named Bit.Trip Beat one of the best games of the year, as well as four other Destructoid editors.

=== Later releases ===
The PC version has received fairly positive reception as well. Gamezebo described it as a combination of Pong and Guitar Hero, commenting that the combination of Pong-like gameplay and rhythmic gameplay usually "works beautifully". While describing its gameplay as "simple yet addictive" and its aesthetics as "primitive yet beautiful", they criticized the game length, high difficulty level, and a lack of multi-player. They also noted that the Wii version was superior. Indie Games' Tim W. featured the Windows and Mac OS X versions as part of the web site's Best Of Indie Games feature. Fellow Indie Games editor Michael Rose strongly suggested buying it, describing it as a "far more insane" version of Pong. However, he did criticize it for having few, long levels that could be difficult for people who have difficulty keeping focus. Mobile gaming developer Zach Cage called Bit.Trip Beat one of his favourite games released in the past 10 years. IGN's Charles Onyett called it "fluid and creative", though deriding its high level of difficulty. He praised the game for its aesthetics, calling the music "catchy" and the visuals "irresistible" to long-time gamers, though feeling that the graphics can get distracting at times. He also praised the developers for the inclusion of online leaderboards.

GamesRadar's Andrew Hayward praised the premise of the game as well as the iOS' touch controls. He also named it one of the 50 best iPad games of 2010. Gamezebo praised the iOS version for its aesthetics and gameplay and criticized it for its difficulty like they did with the Steam version; however, while it features the multi-player mode that they criticized the computer version for lacking, they criticized it for its "chaotic" nature and connection issues. IGN's Levi Buchanan found that while it was aesthetically pleasing and fun, it was too difficult. Adrenaline Vault's Michael Smith recommended that iOS device owners buy it, citing quality gameplay, graphics, and music, the latter two he says are good even if certain players do not like 8-bit. While he typically advises readers to "try before you buy" when buying a $5 iOS game, he cites Bit.Trip Beat as an exception.

Ars Technica's Ben Kuchera called the iOS version "near perfect". He described its "rhythm game meets Pong" style as working well on the platform. GamePro's Ryan Rigney featured it as one of their App Store Games of the Week of October 1, 2010. They called it a combination of music video game Audiosurf and Pong, praising Gaijin Games for mixing the old with the new. UGO Networks' Jason Cipriano called it addictive in their article on iOS games with achievements. Wired's John Mix Meyer listed it as one of the iPad's "10 Biggest, Baddest Games", commenting that while alone its elements were not strong enough to make a game, combined they are great. It was nominated for the Excellence in Audio award at the Independent Games Festival in 2010; it ultimately lost to Amnesia: The Dark Descent. Game Set Watch's Eric Caoili speculated that if Bit.Trip Beat is successful on the iOS platforms, that Namco Bandai may publish more of them.

=== Legacy ===
Bit.Trip Beat was the first in a series of six titles. It was followed by Bit.Trip Core, which uses the d-pad to control the gameplay instead of motion controls. The third game in the series is titled Bit.Trip Void, which puts players in control of an 8-bit ball. The fourth game is titled Bit.Trip Runner, the first game to put players in direct control of CommanderVideo. The fifth game in the series is titled Bit.Trip Fate, a side-scrolling on-rails shooter that again puts players in direct control of Commander Video. The final game in the series, Bit.Trip Flux, features similar mechanics and ideas to Beat, including featuring the same guest musician and its Pong-like gameplay. The developer attributes the return to this gameplay mechanic as Commander Video returning to "his simplest energetic state". However, it was designed to be easier than its predecessor, with no Game Over possible.

== Android compatibility issue ==
On Android systems running Android Marshmallow or higher, Bit.Trip Beat freezes upon opening. The Android app has not been updated since 2012, and the Bit.Trip Beat Android support email address has stopped responding.
