= Runner2 =

2013 video game

- Developer: Gaijin Games
- Publishers: Gaijin Games (PC & Wii U); Aksys Games (X360 & PS3)
- Producers: Alex Neuse; Mike Roush
- Designers: Danny Johnson; Alex Neuse
- Programmers: Darren Ensley; Mike Gonzales; Andrew Hynek
- Artists: Jason Cirillo; Chris Meyer; Mike Roush
- Composers: Petrified Productions; Disasterpeace
- Series: Bit.Trip
- Engine: Atrophy Engine
- Platforms: Microsoft Windows, OS X, Linux, Wii U, Xbox 360, PlayStation 3, PlayStation 4, PlayStation Vita, iOS, Nintendo Switch
- Release: Windows, OS X, Linux: WW: February 26, 2013; Wii U: NA: February 26, 2013; EU: April 11, 2013; AU: August 22, 2013; Xbox 360: WW: February 27, 2013; PlayStation 3: NA: March 5, 2013; EU: August 21, 2013; iOS: WW: October 31, 2013; PlayStation Vita: WW: December 17, 2013; PlayStation 4: WW: February 24, 2016; Nintendo Switch: WW: February 29, 2024
- Genre: Platform
- Mode: Single-player

Bit.Trip Presents... Runner2: Future Legend of Rhythm Alien (also known as simply Runner2) is a 2013 side-scrolling platformer developed by Gaijin Games. The game is the sequel to Bit.Trip Runner (2010) and was released as a downloadable title on PlayStation 3, PlayStation Vita, Xbox 360, Wii U, Microsoft Windows, OS X, Linux, and iOS. Versions for PlayStation 4 and Nintendo Switch were later released in 2016 and 2024 respectively. The PC, Mac, Linux, and Wii U versions were self-published by Gaijin Games, and the Xbox 360 and PlayStation 3 versions were published by Aksys Games.

While Runner2 has a lot in common with its predecessor, its polygonal graphics mark a significant departure from past entries in the Bit.Trip series. In an interview with Push Square, Gaijin Games co-founder Mike Roush cited the studio's urge to “spread its wings a bit” as the inspiration behind the change. The game also features narration by Charles Martinet.

Runner2 received generally positive reviews from critics. A sequel, Runner3, released in 2018 for Nintendo Switch, PlayStation 4 and PC.

== Gameplay ==
Runner2 is divided into five themed worlds, each with fourteen regular levels and five bonus stages for a grand total of ninety-five. The goal of each level is to guide the chosen character to the end of the level without striking an obstacle or falling off the screen. The character runs automatically, and in order to arrive safely at the finish, the player must perform various simple actions such as jumping, sliding and kicking, as well as more complex moves including hanging from rails, deflecting projectiles with a shield, and slide-kicking. Most obstacles require the player to perform one specific action to survive—jumping over ground-based enemies, sliding under hovering enemies or fireballs (which fly at head height), kicking stop-sign walls—although the player can either deflect the square "beat" blocks to earn points or simply slide under them. If the player hits an obstacle (including failing to jump and thus running into a wall) or falls off the screen, the game rewinds to the beginning of the level. Runner2 introduces checkpoints halfway through normal levels and after each phase of a boss level; if the player suffers a "bonk" after hitting a checkpoint, the game rewinds to that checkpoint. The game has very mild penalties for failure: it does not track lives, so the player can fail a level as many times as necessary to beat it. It does reset the rewound area, so the player must collect gold bars and mode upgrades again, and it does track the total number of player bonks and ratio of bonks to level completions, though this only affects players curious enough to look at the stats page.

Although it shares the auto-running style of its predecessor, the game also boasts several new features. There's a glide move that enables the character to travel further while jumping, a loop-the-loop that challenges the player to twirl their analog stick in tandem with the character's placement on the circle, diamond-shaped structures that task the player with pressing buttons at the correct time, and a dance move. The glide move proves necessary to make many of the game's jumps. The loop-the-loop and diamond structures simply award players bonus points for good timing, with no way to suffer a hit. Dancing earns the player bonus points but causes the character to ignore other inputs, such as jumping and ducking, for the approximately half second the dance animation takes, meaning the player must carefully time their dancing to maximize points while not crashing into obstacles. As noted above, the game also introduces checkpoints at the halfway mark of each level. These take the form of crossbars which the player may run into, allowing them to continue at that point rather than the beginning of the level, or jump over, which does not set the rewind marker but does award bonus points. If a player manages to gather every gold bar and mode upgrade in a level, they're provided a chance to shoot the character into a large target from a cannon. The closer the character lands to the center, the more points the player receives. Hitting the bulls-eye earns the player a Perfect+ ranking for the level, the goal of some of the in-game challenges as well as achievements or trophies.

=== Costumes and alternate characters ===
Runner2 also boasts a variety of unlockables, such as additional costumes and new characters (including Unkle Dill, CommandgirlVideo, Whetfahrt Cheeseborger, Reverse Merman, Pitazo, CaptainVideo, and retro CommanderVideo). Costumes are hidden in treasure chests scattered throughout the game, whereas new characters are earned by completing certain levels. The player simply needs to run into a treasure chest to claim it, and they keep it even if they suffer a hit later in the level. In some levels, giant locks protect the path to the treasure chest. The player must first complete the Key Vault level in that world to make keys appear, then replay such levels to collect the key and chest.

=== Retro levels ===
Similar to its predecessor, Runner2 is home to several retro levels, which unlock when players uncover hidden Famicom cartridges. Collecting a cartridge immediately ends the level; in some cases the player must collect a key and open a lock guarding the path which contains the cartridge. While the retro levels of Runner were inspired by the Atari 2600 era of gaming, Runner2's retro levels are more reminiscent of the 8-bit era.

== Development and release ==
Runner2 was released as a downloadable title for the Wii U on the Nintendo eShop and on Microsoft Windows, OS X, and Linux via Steam on February 26, 2013. It was then released on the Xbox 360's Xbox Live Arcade the next day. The game was released on the PlayStation Network on March 5, 2013. Although all versions are generally the same, the Wii U version offers the added ability of playing on the Wii U GamePad with the Off TV Play function. The developers also confirmed that because Wii U is the newest platform with the most memory, it has the best overall load times of any of the consoles. Runner2 was removed from the Xbox Marketplace sometime in 2018, alongside other Aksys published titles.

=== Later releases ===
The game is also available on PS Vita, PS4 and Nintendo Switch. An iOS version, entitled Bit.Trip Run, was released on October 31, 2013. It was heavily modified from the original game to be adapted for touch controls.

=== Downloadable content ===
A "Good Friends" DLC pack was released on Steam on July 11, 2013, with a release for the console versions to follow. The DLC adds six characters from various titles, including Dr. Fetus from Super Meat Boy, Josef from Machinarium, Quote from Cave Story, Raz from Psychonauts, and the Spelunker from Spelunky, along with an invisible Commander Video skin. Atlas from Portal 2 is a Steam-exclusive character.

== Audio ==
Like the rest of the Bit.Trip series, Runner2's music is a pivotal part of the experience. There's a sound associated with every action, which allows the player to contribute to the soundtrack as they progress. Chiptune artist Disasterpeace provided the music for the game's retro stages, and Petrified Productions provided the rest of the soundtrack. The narration in this game is done by Super Mario voice actor Charles Martinet.

== Promotion ==
Prior to its release, Gaijin Games promoted Runner2 with several gameplay videos, character announcements, and frequent updates on their blog. In one post, the studio asked its readers to try their hand at naming levels in the game; in another, they discussed the nature of development transparency, and the merits of keeping fans and press in the loop over the course of a game's creation.

In one of the more well-publicized reveals, Gaijin Games co-founder Alex Neuse informed Joystiq that the team was keeping track of how many beers they consumed over the course of development.

== Reception ==
Reception

Aggregate score
Aggregator	Score
Metacritic	PC: 85/100; WIIU: 84/100; X360: 87/100; PS3: 86/100; VITA: 83/100

Review scores
Publication	Score
Eurogamer	8/10
Game Informer	9/10
GameSpot	9/10
IGN	9/10
Joystiq	4/5
Nintendo Life	9/10
TouchArcade	4.5/5

Runner2 was met with positive reviews. IGN called it "one of the finest music games ever made," and referred to the synchronicity of the music and gameplay as trance-inducing. GameSpot similarly praised the soundtrack and gameplay, stating that "you feel like you're reacting instinctually with button presses before you consciously realize what you're doing." Neal Ronaghan of the Nintendo World Report referred to it as "one of the best side-scrolling platformers in recent memory," citing in particular its visuals and gameplay.

Chris Plante of Polygon enjoyed Runner2's inviting nature, calling it a game "everyone can play." Destructoid's Kyle MacGregor stated that, although he was apprehensive of Runner2's departure from the Bit.Trip series' trademark retro graphics, he'd "come to prefer the new look." He also said that it felt "like a very natural progression for the series," and that "Runner2 is a marvelous platformer that just about anyone should be able to enjoy."

=== Sales ===
The game sold more than 1 million units by March 2014.
