= Nullsleep =

American electronic musician and computer artist

- Nullsleep - live at The Tank, NYC 2006

Background information
- Born: Jeremiah Johnson; October 7, 1980 (age 45)
- Origin: Riverside, California, U.S.
- Genres: Electronic; chiptune; synthpop; indie
- Instruments: Game Boy; Famicom; LSDJ; MCK; keyboard
- Years active: 1999–present
- Labels: 8bitpeoples, Intikrec
- Website: Nullsleep.com

Jeremiah Johnson (born October 7, 1980), better known as Nullsleep, is an American electronic musician and computer artist currently residing in New York City. In 1999 he co-founded the low-bit art collective 8bitpeoples, and has served as its lead director since its inception. He is best known for his high-energy Game Boy pop songs.

Johnson graduated from the Fu Foundation School of Engineering and Applied Science at Columbia University in 2003, where he studied computer science and music. He uses Game Boys and NES consoles to create music.

== Biography ==
=== 1980 to 1998: Formative Experiences ===
Born on a United States Air Force base, March AFB in Riverside, California, Johnson's family relocated to New York upon his father's honorable discharge from the USAF shortly after his birth. Most of his childhood was spent on suburban Long Island, where he attended Islip High School and lived with his mother and brother until he was 18 years old.

Johnson has cited the film Electric Dreams as an influential force in his early musical pursuits. Inspired by a Giorgio Moroder arrangement of a minuet featured in the film, Johnson took 3 weeks of cello lessons during one summer of his adolescence. This would be the only formal musical training he would have until entering university. However, Moroder's synthesizer-driven Italo disco style would have a more lasting effect.

Throughout his high school years, Johnson spent increasing amounts of time working with computers, coding BASIC programs with his younger brother, following the demoscene, and exploring the web. It was during this time that he met Mike Hanlon in an Internet chatroom – together the two would go on to found 8bitpeoples.

=== 1999 to 2004: Early History ===
In September 1999, Johnson began studying at Columbia University in New York City. Around this time the idea for 8bitpeoples was born out of an IM conversation he had with friend Mike Hanlon. The idea for the group centered on forming a collective of like-minded musicians, who were inspired or influenced by the aesthetics of early videogames and were interested in offering their music for free through digital distribution. Johnson put together their first website and hosted it on the desktop computer in his university dorm room. Early on he established himself as the driving force behind the group, acting as organizing and directing 8bitpeoples, while also actively contributing as an artist.

His early works bear little resemblance to the style and direction that his music would later take. Wooden Polyurethane Papers, his first release, is a silly and playful collection of loosely constructed songs with a penchant for raw waveforms, simplistic synths, and low-quality samples. He followed this with Click Bleep Click, a 3-track EP consisting of much more complex compositions that tend toward bittersweet melodies, processed videogame samples, and field recordings from around Manhattan. This is an interesting entry within Nullsleep's discography as it shows a very different direction that could have been pursued, but was instead apparently abandoned. With his next two releases on 8bitpeoples, Hello World and The Gameboy Singles 2002, Nullsleep focused once again on playful simplicity. The latter of these two was his first release to be composed entirely on the Game Boy (using the LSDJ tracker) and marks the beginning of his period working exclusively with videogame hardware.

That same year, Nullsleep was also working on his Depeche Mode Megamix, a 14+ minute Game Boy composition paying tribute to the influential synthpop band Depeche Mode. The megamix (composed of Enjoy the Silence, Photographic, New Life, and Everything Counts) was only performed live once, during a show at Remote Lounge in New York. During the performance the Game Boy which Nullsleep was performing on crashed and wiped out the contents of the cartridge, forcing him to play the second half of the mix from a backup recording. This recording was later released on 8bitpeoples along with a condensed minimix version, and has since been downloaded over 100,000+ times. Around this same period of time, Nullsleep began exploring music composition on the Nintendo Entertainment System using a program called MCK which takes music macro language (MML) as input. He would go on to release a number of NES chiptunes through his personal site, but they would remain mostly unreleased through 8bitpeoples, with the exception of his Axel F and Silent Night arrangements on two different compilations. While Nullsleep continues to compose and perform using the NES (and later the Famicom), the bulk of his creative efforts remain attached to the Game Boy.

== Discography ==
=== Albums & EPs ===
Wooden Polyurethane Papers (8bitpeoples, 1999)
Click Bleep Click (8bitpeoples, 2000)
Hello World (8bitpeoples, 2001)
The Gameboy Singles 2002 (8bitpeoples, 2002)
Depeche Mode Megamix (8bitpeoples, 2002)
Electric Heart Strike (8bitpeoples, 2007)
Unconditional Acceleration (8bitpeoples, 2008)
Shadowtravel (Radiograffiti, 2013)

=== Compilation Appearances ===
Colors (promo, 8bitpeoples CD, 1999)
Axel F (8bitpeoples MP3/CD, 2002)
Retork (Enough Records MP3, 2003)
VGM Mixtape #8 (NoSides Records CD, 2003)
The 8bits of Christmas (holiday album, 8bitpeoples MP3, 2003)
Sonic Rec Room (Codek Records CD, 2004)
Dirty Soundtrack Vol.2 (d-i-r-t-y.com MP3, 2004)
Microdisko Vol.01 (Microdisko CD, 2005)
GB/V.A. (Intikrec CD, 2005)
8BP050 (8bitpeoples 2xCD, 2006)
8-Bit Operators: The Music of Kraftwerk (tribute compilation, Astralwerks Records, 2007)
Getsumen To Heiki Mina Vol. 4 (Aniplex CD)
Getsumen To Heiki Mina Chiptune Collection (Aniplex CD)

=== Video games ===
- Bit.Trip Void
