= Choice Provisions =

American video game developer

Choice Provisions Inc.
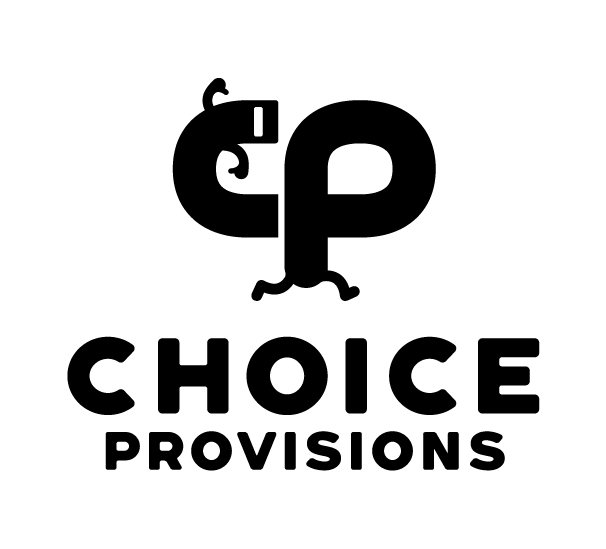
- Formerly: Gaijin Games Inc. (2007–2014)
- Type: Private
- Industry: Video games
- Founded: 2007; 18 years ago
- Headquarters: Santa Cruz, California
- Key people: Alex Neuse & Mike Roush
- Products: BIT.TRIP series Tharsis; Hextech Mayhem: A League of Legends Story; Woah Dave!
- Website: choiceprovisions.com

Choice Provisions Inc., formerly known as Gaijin Games Inc. prior to June 2014, is an American independent video game development studio, best known for their Bit.Trip series of video games. The studio was founded in 2007 by Alex Neuse, Mike Roush, and Chris Osborn and is located in Santa Cruz, California.

== History ==
Gaijin Games initially emerged in 2004. The founder, Alex Neuse, had been employed at LucasArts since 1997, but after the project he had been working on was cancelled, Neuse decided that he wanted greater creative freedom, which spurred him to create his own studio. However, the company was unable to acquire sufficient funds or support from a publisher, and all of its development endeavors were halted indefinitely when Neuse was offered the position of creative director at Santa Cruz Games.

At Santa Cruz Games, Mike Roush, Alex Neuse and Chris Osborn formed a friendship. Neuse, Roush and Osborn were involved in the development of several games tied into licensed properties, but they became dissatisfied with the restrictions on their creativity. Osborn, with his love for Chiptunes, Neuse with his affinity for Atari 2600 and Roush with his aesthetic and drive for unique experiences, shared the same philosophies of game design. Subsequently, the trio quit their jobs at Santa Cruz to start up Gaijin Games again.

Neuse had a variety of game ideas that he had sketched out in a notebook, which he pitched to Roush and Osborn. Eventually, they settled on their favorite six concepts and formed the idea of a series called '8-Bit: A series of six new classics in the 8-bit style for humans who enjoy fun'. Gaijin signed a publishing deal with Aksys Games, then ditched the previous title in favor of BIT.TRIP and began development on the first title. Danny Johnson joined Gaijin during the fifth game in the series. Between the fifth and sixth games, Gaijin collaborated with Different Cloth to bring an iPhone/iPod Touch game, lilt line, to the WiiWare service. After all six games in the series were completed, Osborn left Gaijin Games to form another independent studio known as Tracer. After Osborn's departure, Roush and Neuse took on the monikers of Co-Founders and Co-Creators of all Gaijin projects and creative endeavors.

Following the climax of the BIT.TRIP series, Gaijin Games announced that they were very interested in developing games for the Nintendo 3DS and have since obtained development kits for the handheld device. Their first 3DS title was released in 2011 and was revealed to be a compilation of the six BIT.TRIP games called Bit.Trip Saga. In February 2011, the studio also absorbed the small-time developer Robotube, founded by Jason Cirillo - Roush explained this move as an effort to branch out into "more experimental, casual games." After the studio was rebranded as Choice Provisions in June 2014, the Robotube subsidiary was also rebranded as "Minivisions." The first game released under the Minivisions label was Woah Dave!, which initially released on October 30, 2014.

After almost a 2-year development cycle, Gaijin Games completed the sequel to RUNNER, Runner2 on February 26, 2013. It sold over 1 million units within the first year.

In June 2014, the company announced it would be changing its name to Choice Provisions. The studio decided to change their name due to the arguably negative connotations of the term "gaijin" ("foreigner" in Japanese).

== Games ==
=== Bit.Trip series ===
Game title	Release	Platform(s)	Notes
Bit.Trip Beat	March 16, 2009	Wii, Nintendo 3DS, Microsoft Windows, OS X, Linux, iOS, Android, Nintendo Switch	Switch version released on December 25, 2020
Bit.Trip Core	July 6, 2009	Wii, Nintendo 3DS, Microsoft Windows, OS X, Nintendo Switch	Switch version released on December 25, 2020
Bit.Trip Void	October 27, 2009	Wii, Nintendo 3DS, Microsoft Windows, OS X, Nintendo Switch	Switch version released on December 25, 2020
Bit.Trip Runner	May 14, 2010	Wii, Nintendo 3DS, Microsoft Windows, OS X, Linux, Nintendo Switch	Switch version released on December 25, 2020
Bit.Trip Fate	October 25, 2010	Wii, Nintendo 3DS, Microsoft Windows, OS X, Nintendo Switch	Switch version released on December 25, 2020
Bit.Trip Flux	February 25, 2011	Wii, Nintendo 3DS, Microsoft Windows, OS X, Nintendo Switch	Switch version released on December 25, 2020
Bit.Trip Saga	September 13, 2011	Nintendo 3DS	Enhanced compilation of the six original Bit.Trip games
Bit.Trip Complete	September 13, 2011	Wii	Enhanced compilation of the six original Bit.Trip games
Runner2	February 26, 2013	Microsoft Windows, OS X, Linux, Wii U (eShop), Xbox 360 (XBLA), PlayStation 3 (PSN), PlayStation 4 (PSN), PlayStation Vita, iOS, Nintendo Switch	An HD sequel to Runner, Switch version released on February 29, 2024
The Bit.Trip	December 5, 2015	PlayStation 3, PlayStation 4, PlayStation Vita	Enhanced compilation of the six original Bit.Trip games
Runner3	May 22, 2018	Microsoft Windows, OS X, Nintendo Switch	
Bit.Trip Rerunner	September 19, 2023	Microsoft Windows, PlayStation 5, Xbox Series X/S	Remake of Runner with a level editor, PS5 and Xbox Series X/S versions released on May 22, 2024 and May 28, 2024 respectively

=== Other games ===
Game title	Release	Platform	Notes
Lilt Line	December 13, 2010	WiiWare	Published WiiWare version, developed by Different Cloth
Bloktonik	June 15, 2011	iPad	Published iOS version, developed by Robotube Games
Woah Dave!	October 30, 2014	Microsoft Windows, iOS, Mac, Nintendo 3DS, Wii U, PlayStation Vita, PlayStation 4, Linux, Android	Developed under the MiniVisions label
Destructamundo	December 10, 2014	iOS, Android, Windows	Developed under the MiniVisions label
Dragon Fantasy: The Volumes of Westeria	April 9, 2015	Microsoft Windows, Mac, Nintendo 3DS, Wii U, Linux	Published Steam, Wii U & 3DS versions, developed by Muteki
Shutshimi	August 25, 2015	Microsoft Windows, Mac, PlayStation Vita, PlayStation 4, Linux	Developed by Neon Deity Games
Laserlife	September 22, 2015	Microsoft Windows, PlayStation 4, Xbox One	
Tharsis	January 12, 2016	Microsoft Windows, macOS, PlayStation 4	
Drive!Drive!Drive!	December 13, 2016	Microsoft Windows, PlayStation 4, PlayStation Vita	Developed by Different Cloth
Space Dave!	January 25, 2018	Nintendo Switch	Developed under the MiniVisions label
Bubsy: Paws on Fire!	May 16, 2019	PC, Nintendo Switch, PlayStation 4	
Hextech Mayhem: A League of Legends Story	November 16, 2021	PC, Nintendo Switch	
Word Warrior: Zombie Typocalypse	December 14, 2023	PC	
Breakout Beyond	March 25, 2025	PlayStation 4, PlayStation 5, Xbox One, Xbox Series X/S, Nintendo Switch, PC, Atari VCS	Was originally developed as a game for the Intellivision Amico
