= Bit.Trip =

- CommanderVideo, the protagonist of the Bit.Trip series
- Genres: Rhythm, action
- Developer: Choice Provisions (formerly Gaijin Games)
- Platforms: Microsoft Windows, macOS, Linux, iOS, PlayStation 4, PlayStation 3, PlayStation Vita, Wii, Wii U, Nintendo 3DS, Xbox 360, Nintendo Switch
- First release: Bit.Trip Beat; April 28, 2009
- Latest release: Bit.Trip Rerunner; September 19, 2023

Bit.Trip, stylized BIT.TRIP, is a series of nine video games developed by Choice Provisions (or under their previous name Gaijin Games) and published by Aksys Games for the Wii, Nintendo 3DS, Microsoft Windows, macOS, PS Vita, PS4, and PS5. It was published by Arc System Works for WiiWare and Nintendo eShop in Japan, and by Namco Networks America Inc for the iPhone, iPod Touch and iPad.

Each game revolves around the adventures of a character named "Commander Video", and features "a crazy mix of 80s aesthetics and modern game design". The styles of the games range from pong-like, to platforming, and shooting. Each game in the series features a chiptune-inspired soundtrack, but a different style of rhythm-based gameplay in each. Most games in the series have few levels; Beat, Core, Void and Flux have only three levels each while Fate has six and Runner has 36. Most of the games feature levels lasting between 10 and 25 minutes to make up for having such few levels. The games also consists of 8 modes; Nether, Hyper, Mega, Super, Ultra, Extra, Giga, and Meta; which changes based on how well the player does. Each successive game adds a new mode, the highest being Mega in Beat, and Meta in Flux.

== Games ==
=== Main series ===
==== Bit.Trip Beat ====
Reminiscent of the classic video game Pong, Bit.Trip Beat (2009) involves players moving an onscreen paddle in order to bounce off waves of incoming blocks to the beat of the music. As the player progresses through the game, the patterns of blocks become increasingly complex, but players can judge how well they are doing through changes in the graphics and music. The game is played by tilting the Wii Remote rotated on its side to move the paddle, via stylus or circle pad on the 3DS, via touch on iOS devices, via keyboard or mouse on PC, or via motion controls on the Nintendo Switch by tilting the controller (or console in handheld mode), or through the use of the controller's joystick. Bit.Trip Beat also features up to 4-player cooperative multiplayer.

In October 2009, Gaijin Games released the soundtrack to Bit.Trip Beat as a digital download, first on CDBaby and then on other major music stores. The soundtrack features over 19 minutes of chiptunes from the game.

On November 3, 2010, Bit.Trip Beat was released on the Steam platform for Windows and Mac.

==== Bit.Trip Core ====
The second game in the series, Bit.Trip Core (2009), continues the rhythm based gameplay of the series. The gameplay involves players taking control of a plus shape in the middle of the screen that can fire a laser beam in only four directions (up, down, left and right), with the objective being to destroy patterns of blocks that zoom across the screen. As with the first game, as the player progresses through the game the patterns of blocks become increasingly complex, with changes in the graphics and music occurring based on how well they play.

In March 2010, Gaijin Games released the soundtrack to Bit.Trip Core as a digital download, first on CDBaby, and iTunes, then other major music stores. Despite featuring the same proportion of levels as Bit.Trip Beat, Core's soundtrack is substantially smaller, with less than 15 minutes of music.

==== Bit.Trip Void ====
Released in late 2009, Bit.Trip Void puts players in control of the "void", a black, pixelated circle, which players move around the screen with 8-directional control. The objective of the game is to grow the void by collecting black squares that appear, while also dodging white squares that reset the size of the void and cause the player to lose points. The size of the void can also be reset by the player without incurring point losses, which is often needed as the void grows to sizes making it difficult and/or impossible to dodge the white squares. Void features music by guest composer Nullsleep, and its levels are named after Sigmund Freud's three parts of the human psyche.

The soundtrack to Bit.Trip Void was announced in May 2010, and is now available on CDBaby, as well as through iTunes and Amazon.

==== Bit.Trip Runner ====
Bit.Trip Runner (2010) is the fourth installment of the Bit.Trip series. Runner features over 50 levels. The gameplay involves players controlling Commander Video and making him jump, slide, kick, and more through various obstacles in his path. The special guest band Anamanaguchi provides menu and credits music. Though it has over 50 levels, called Challenges, breaking the 3 level norm of the last games, these levels are divided evenly amongst 3 zones, called Levels, which each have their own distinct background and musical feel; each level houses twelve challenges, including a boss challenge. For every challenge (except boss challenges) there is a retro challenge awarded should the player collect all gold bars in the normal level. Each retro challenge is harder than the normal challenge and usually has more gold bars. The perfect completion of a retro challenge will award players with an exclamation point beside the stage and the word "PERFECT" beside the score in the scoreboard, but only if they have done everything "extra" (e.g., jumping on top of springboards that they do not need to in order to finish) in the challenge beforehand. Bit.Trip Runner won the 2011 Independent Games Festival (IGF) Excellence in Visual Arts award.

On February 28, 2011, Bit.Trip Runner was released on the Steam platform for Windows and Mac.

==== Bit.Trip Fate ====
Bit.Trip Fate (2010) is the fifth installment of the series. It is a rhythm rail shooter, or shmup. It was formally announced on September the 4th, at the Penny Arcade Expo, in the Destructoid LIVE booth. It was released on WiiWare on October 25, 2010.

The game sees Commander Video travelling across a set path, able to move anywhere along this path and shoot in any direction. By defeating enemies and collecting the items they drop, Commander Video can enhance his state, though it will drop if he is hit. Along the way, he can run into allies which temporarily give him special weapons. Among these characters are CommandGirl Video and Junior Melchkin from previous BIT.TRIP games, as well as cameo appearances by Super Meat Boy and Mr. Robotube, who are characters from other independent video games.

It is the first video game to prominently feature dubstep music.

==== Bit.Trip Flux ====
Bit.Trip Flux (2011), the sixth game in the main series, returns to the gameplay of Bit.Trip Beat while combining elements from the other five games in the series, such as beats the player's paddle must avoid. As with the other games, changes in the graphics and music of the title reflect how well the player is doing, though there are multiple checkpoints in each level, unlike in Beat. Similar to Beat, Bit.Trip Flux also features two-player cooperative multiplayer.

==== Bit.Trip Presents... Runner2: Future Legend of Rhythm Alien ====
Bit.Trip Presents Runner2 (2013) is a spin-off and spiritual successor to Bit.Trip Runner. While having the same main character and play style, the game is only a non-canon side story in between Runner and Fate. This is the first game in the series to be released for Wii U, PS3 and Xbox 360. Unlike the previous Bit.Trip games, it is not 8 bit themed.

==== Runner3 ====
Runner3 is a rhythm platform game developed by Choice Provisions. A sequel to Bit.Trip Presents... Runner2: Future Legend of Rhythm Alien, Runner3 is part of the Bit.Trip series, starring the character CommanderVideo. The game was released on May 22, 2018, on Microsoft Windows, macOS, and Nintendo Switch, and it released for PlayStation 4 in November 2018, Xbox One will release later.

==== Bit.Trip Rerunner ====
Bit.Trip Rerunner is a rhythm platform game developed by Choice Provisions. A remake to Bit.Trip Runner, Bit.Trip Rerunner is part of the Bit.Trip series, starring the character CommanderVideo. The game was released on September 19, 2023, on Steam, May 22, 2024, on PlayStation 5, and May 28, 2024, on Xbox Series X/S. The game also featured a built-in level editor to create and share levels. In February 2026, a kickstarter was launched for a potential Nintendo Switch 2 version of the game.

=== Compilations ===
==== Bit.Trip Saga / Complete ====
The entire WiiWare Bit.Trip series was released for the Nintendo 3DS and Wii in collections respectively titled Bit.Trip Saga and Bit.Trip Complete respectively on September 13, 2011, in North America and March 16, 2012, in Europe. The 3DS version of the game features new control schemes (for instance, stylus control via the touchscreen for Beat and Flux) while the Wii version has 20 extra "challenge levels" for each game, as well as bonus content related to the production of the games. Both compilations also included a CD soundtrack called "Bit.Trip Soundtrack Sampler" featuring a number of tracks from each of the individual games. The soundtrack comes with every copy of Bit.Trip Complete, and was available as a pre-order bonus when purchasing Bit.Trip Saga from GameStop.

==== The Bit.Trip ====
A compilation of the first six games (up to Flux) for the PlayStation 4 and PlayStation Vita. This collection was announced at the 2015 PlayStation Experience and was released later that day, December 5, 2015. This compilation added achievements, and retained the difficulty levels from Complete. A PlayStation 3 Version was planned but later cancelled for unknown reasons.

== Appearances in other media ==
Since release Commander Video has made several appearances in video games outside of the Bit.Trip series, including as playable character in games such as Super Meat Boy, Indie Pogo, Fraymakers, Minecraft, and UFHO2. He also makes an appearance in Retro City Rampage and Octodad: Dadliest Catch, as a swimmer in Ridiculous Fishing and as a trophy in Super Smash Bros. for Wii U. CommandGirl Video is a playable character in Woah Dave! which was created by the same developers that made the Bit.Trip series.

== Reception and legacy ==
Aggregate review scores
Game	Metacritic
Bit.Trip BEAT	80/100
Bit.Trip CORE	80/100
Bit.Trip VOID	79/100
Bit.Trip RUNNER	76/100
Bit.Trip FATE	74/100
Bit.Trip FLUX	81/100
Bit.Trip Presents... Runner2: Future Legend of Rhythm Alien	85/100
Runner3	73/100

Throughout the series, the Bit.Trip games have enjoyed positive critical reception. IGN gave Bit.Trip Beat an 8/10, praising the presentation of the game but lamenting the lack of online leaderboards. Bit.Trip Runner won the 2011 Independent Games Festival (IGF) Excellence in Visual Arts award. Nintendo Power magazine gave a score of 9.0 out of 10.

== Marketing ==
In order to promote the first game, a viral marketing campaign and alternate reality game was launched, revolving around the mystery surrounding the Commander Video character. The campaign revolved around internet videos and "missions" sent out by The Commander, which involved spreading word about the game, uncovering information about it and creating an English Wikipedia entry.

== See also ==
- Art Style
- bit Generations
