= Bit.Trip Flux =

2011 video game

- Developer: Gaijin Games
- Publishers: Aksys Games (Wii, 3DS) Gaijin Games (PC) QubicGames (Switch)
- Series: Bit.Trip
- Platforms: Wii, Nintendo 3DS, Microsoft Windows, OS X, Nintendo Switch
- Release: WiiWare: PAL: February 25, 2011; NA: February 28, 2011; Wii: NA: September 13, 2011; PAL: March 16, 2012; Nintendo 3DS: NA: September 13, 2011; EU: March 16, 2012; JP: July 10, 2013; Windows, OS X: WW: June 5, 2014; Nintendo Switch: WW: December 25, 2020
- Genres: Action, Music
- Modes: Single-player, Multiplayer

Bit.Trip Flux, marketed as BIT.TRIP FLUX, is an arcade-style rhythm game developed by Gaijin Games (now Choice Provisions) and published by Aksys Games (WiiWare version) and QubicGames (Nintendo Switch version) as the sixth and final game of the main Bit.Trip series. It was released for the Wii's WiiWare download service on February 25, 2011, which was later ported to Microsoft Windows and OS X. It was released on the Steam platform on June 5, 2014, and was ported to the PlayStation 4 and Nintendo 3DS as part of a collection later on. A standalone version was released on Nintendo Switch on December 25, 2020.

== Gameplay ==
Bit.Trip Flux plays very similarly to that of the first game in the Bit.Trip series, Bit.Trip Beat. The player must hold the Wii Remote in a sideways position and rotate it towards or away from the screen, or move the mouse forwards and backwards on the Windows and OS X versions, to cause the paddle on-screen to move up or down in an attempt to reflect beats (square blocks moving towards the player's side of the screen).

Different types of beats will move from the left side of the screen towards the right. The player must reflect all of them (except for bonus beats and avoid blobs). As the player successfully reflects beats, a bar at the top of the screen will start to fill. When it does, the graphics will change and the player will mode-up to a higher mode and earn more points for each beat. If the player fails to reflect a beat, a bar at the bottom of the screen will start to fill. When it does, the graphics will change and the player will mode-down to a lower mode and earn less points for each beat. Should the player mode-down to the lowest mode, the Nether mode, they must mode-up or they will be sent to the beginning of the last checkpoint.

There are 3 main levels to the game: Epiphany, Perception, and Catharsis. At the start, the player can only choose the Epiphany level, and must beat it to unlock Perception. After beating Perception, the player will unlock Catharsis. Each main level is divided into smaller levels that have checkpoints after completing each one. These checkpoints, however, can only be reached in the same play session. If the player quits the game, they will have to start at the beginning of one of the 3 main levels.

=== Display ===
The screen is divided into 3 parts. The top part shows the name of the mode the player will be in, which will change (or mode-up) if the bar below the name fills completely. The top bar fills as the player earns points from successfully reflecting beats. In the top right corner, the player's current score is shown. The middle part is the main area of play, where the player's paddle is on the right edge of the screen and beats move from left to right before being reflected back. As the player reflects higher numbers of beats in succession, a number will briefly appear each time to show the count of the chain. The bottom part of the screen shows the name of the mode the player will move down to (or mode-down) if the bar next to it fills completely. The bottom bar fills as the player misses beats or hits avoid blobs. In the bottom right corner is the bonus multiplier that shows how much additional points each beat will add to the player's score.

=== Key differences from Bit.Trip Beat ===
While Bit.Trip Beat has the player controlling a paddle on the left edge of the screen with beats coming from the right side of the screen, Bit.Trip Flux instead puts the player's paddle on the right edge of the screen, with beats coming from the left.

The colors used for each beat in Bit.Trip Beat give the player a visual clue of what beat type each is, ranging from yellow (normal beat that moves in straight line), orange (beat bounces back toward the player and must be hit multiple times), green (beat fades to transparent and back), and many more. However, in Bit.Trip Flux, the beats are now a uniform white color, regardless of beat type. Bit.Trip Flux adds new avoid blobs that are more circular in shape (keeping with the pixelated style) that will fill the player's Nether bar (and cause the player to move down a mode).

Level progression is also different from Bit.Trip Beat in that the player can reach checkpoints throughout each level. Whereas in Bit.Trip Beat after dying, the player would have to start from the beginning of the level (Transition, Descent, or Growth), Bit.Trip Flux puts the player at the beginning of the last checkpoint they passed, showing “Reset” on-screen as the last checkpoint automatically begins. This feature also means that high scores will not be saved unless the player successfully completes the level.

Bit.Trip Beat can be played by up to 4 players simultaneously (with the size of the paddles reduced), whereas Bit.Trip Flux can only be played by up to 2 players simultaneously. The Windows, OS X and Nintendo Switch versions are single player only.

== Development ==
The game was later bundled with the other five Bit.Trip games as Bit.Trip Complete for the Wii in 2011. A Nintendo Switch port was released on December 25, 2020.

== Reception ==
Reception

Aggregate score
Aggregator	Score
Metacritic	NS: 80/100; Wii: 81/100

Review scores
Publication	Score
Destructoid	9.5/10
Eurogamer	7/10
Game Informer	8.25/10
IGN	8.5/10
Nintendo Life	9/10
Nintendo World Report	8.5/10
Official Nintendo Magazine	8.1/10
Nintendo Force	9/10

Bit.Trip Flux received "generally favorable reviews" according to review aggregator Metacritic.
