= Bit.Trip Fate =

2010 video game

- Developer: Gaijin Games
- Publishers: Aksys Games (Wii, 3DS); Gaijin Games (PC); QubicGames (Switch)
- Designers: Alex Neuse; Danny Johnson
- Series: Bit.Trip
- Platforms: Wii, Nintendo 3DS, Windows, Mac OS X, Nintendo Switch
- Release: WiiWare: NA: October 25, 2010; PAL: November 19, 2010; Wii: NA: September 13, 2011; PAL: March 16, 2012; Nintendo 3DS: NA: September 13, 2011; EU: March 16, 2012; JP: July 10, 2013; Windows, OS X: WW: July 11, 2013; Nintendo Switch: WW: December 25, 2020
- Genres: Scrolling shooter, Music
- Mode: Single-player

Bit.Trip Fate, marketed as BIT.TRIP FATE, is an arcade-style scrolling shooter music game developed by Gaijin Games and published by Aksys Games for the Wii's WiiWare download service.

== Gameplay ==
Bit.Trip Fate takes place over three environments, each divided into two stages and culminating in a boss encounter. The first environment (stages Determination and Patience) resembles a crystal cavern over a space backdrop, the second (stages Desperation and Frustration) a cityscape filled with skyscrapers, and the third (stages Anger and Fall) an underground pit with rivers of magma.

The game's hybrid mechanics feature a side perspective, resembling a horizontal shooter, but with Commander Video confined to a set path, called the Vibe (along which he can freely move forward and backward), an element of rail shooters. In addition, the player controls Commander Video's movement independently of his targeting reticule, similar to the style of twin-stick games descended from Robotron: 2084. The reticule is commanded by the Wii Remote's IR pointer, with bullets firing radially from Commander Video's location. Movement along the rail is faster while the player is not holding down the trigger button. The rail takes on various shapes, usually similar to a sine wave, which are predetermined by the stage, while the screen scrolls at a steady rate. Enemies advance from all directions, firing targeted and patterned bullets tradition to shoot 'em ups.

The player's performance and interaction with enemies creates musical feedback which contributes to the stage's soundtrack, providing an element similar to certain music games, particularly Rez. The gameplay is less rhythmically constrained than previous entries in the series, providing more freedom to the player, but also less dynamic feedback.

== Development ==
The game was later bundled with the other five Bit.Trip games as Bit.Trip Complete for the Wii in 2011. A Nintendo Switch port was released on December 25, 2020.

== Reception ==
Bit.Trip Fate received "generally favorable reviews", according to Metacritic.
