= SSF =

SSF may refer to:

== Gaming ==
- Saturn Sound Format, a Sega Saturn-specific implementation of the Portable Sound Format
- Super Smash Flash, a series of fan-made games based on the Super Smash Bros. series
- Super Street Fighter (disambiguation), various Capcom fighting games

== Organizations ==
- Schweizer Sportfernsehen, a Swiss private TV broadcaster specialized in sport events
- Shakespeare Schools Foundation, a British educational charity
- Singapore Sailing Federation
- Skysurfer Strike Force, a 1995 US superhero animated series
- Society of Saint Francis, a religious order in Anglicanism
- Soul Sonic Force, American hip hop group
- South Sea Fleet of the Chinese military
- Special Security Force, a unit of the government of Bangladesh
- Samajtantrik Sramik Front, a trade union federation in Bangladesh
- Special Service Force, a former brigade of the Canadian Forces
- Sultan's Special Force, a paramilitary unit of the Oman military
- Sunni Students' Federation, an Indian Sunni Muslim students' organisation
- Svenska Scoutförbundet, a Swedish guide and scout association
- All-India Sikh Students' Federation or Sikh Students' Federation (SSF), an Indian Sikh students' organisation

== Other uses ==
- Semi-solid forming, a casting method utilizing metal that is 50% liquid
- Shortest seek first, in computers
- Single-stock futures
- South San Francisco, a city in California, United States
- Space Station Freedom, a proposed U.S. space station
- Small shelly fauna, enigmatic early fossils
- Space Systems Finland, a Finnish software and systems engineering company
- A way of life, popularized by a popular Slovenian shagadelic band Joker Out
