= Fraymakers =

Upcoming fighting game

- Cover artwork consisting of various characters from indie games
- Developers: McLeodGaming; Team Fray
- Platforms: Linux; macOS; Windows; Nintendo Switch (upcoming); Nintendo Switch 2 (upcoming)
- Release: Early access; WW: January 18, 2023
- Genre: Platform fighting
- Modes: Single-player, multiplayer

Fraymakers is a platform fighting game developed by McLeodGaming. It was released in early access on Linux, macOS, and Windows PC via Steam on January 18, 2023. The game is additionally planned to release on Nintendo Switch and Switch 2 once the early access period is complete. The game's character roster is composed of crossover characters from other indie games.

== Gameplay ==
Fraymakers is a platform fighting game. Its roster of playable characters is composed of crossover characters from other indie games, including Octodad (2010), Downwell (2015), Rivals of Aether (2017), Slay the Spire (2019), Ittle Dew (2013), the Bit.Trip series, A Hat In Time (2017), and most recently, Spelunky (2008). Several stages appear based on the fictional universes that the playable characters belong to.

Non-player character (NPC) "assists"—31 additional crossover characters from games such as Machinarium (2009), CrossCode (2018), and Ape Out (2019)—appear during gameplay to aid the player. An external content editor, "FrayTools", allows users to develop custom content for the game.

== Characters ==
When the early access version was first made available, only 4 characters were playable with more added later through updates. The game has a planned launch roster of 10, with more playable characters to be added via post-launch DLC.

Fighter	Game	Creator
CommanderVideo	Bit.Trip	Choice Provisions
Guy Spelunky	Spelunky	Mossmouth
Hat Kid	A Hat in Time	Gears for Breakfast
Impostor	Among Us	Innersloth
Octodad	Octodad: Dadliest Catch	Young Horses
Orcane	Rivals of Aether	Dan Fornace
The Watcher	Slay the Spire	Mega Crit
Ultra Fishbunjin 3000	Ittle Dew	Ludosity
Welltaro	Downwell	Ojiro "Moppin" Fumoto

In addition to the playable characters, the game features 31 additional assist characters, every playable character is also summonable as an assist.

Fighter	Game	Creator
Aine	Renaine	Octosoft
Ape	Ape Out	Gabe Cuzzillo
The Bard	Wandersong	Greg Lobanov
Birthday	King of the Hat	Hat Games
Cadence	Crypt of the NecroDancer	Brace Yourself Games
Captain Viridian	VVVVVV	Terry Cavanagh
Crewmate (Note: Impostor and Crewmate are separate assists)	Among Us	Innersloth
Diogenes	Getting Over It with Bennett Foddy	Bennett Foddy
Gunman Clive	Gunman Clive	Hörberg Productions
Josef	Machinarium	Amanita Design
Kabbu	Bug Fables	Moonsprout Games
The Kid	I Wanna Be the Guy	Michael "Kayin" O'Reilly
Kragg	Rivals of Aether	Dan Fornace
Lady Luck	Dicey Dungeons	Terry Cavanagh
Lea	CrossCode	Radical Fish Games
Leif	Bug Fables	Moonsprout Games
Mustache Girl	A Hat in Time	Gears for Breakfast
Nikandreos	Apotheon	Alientrap
Niko	OneShot	Future Cat
Peppino	Pizza Tower	Tour De Pizza
Pizza	Chicory: A Colorful Tale	Greg Lobanov
Rhythm Doctor	Rhythm Doctor	7th Beat Games
Rockman	FTL: Faster Than Light	Subset Games
Shopkeeper	Downwell	Ojiro "Moppin" Fumoto
The Silent	Slay the Spire	Mega Crit
The Snatcher	A Hat in Time	Gears for Breakfast
Stardrop	Stardrop Sprint	Lowe Bros. Studios
Super Hexagon	Super Hexagon	Terry Cavanagh
Tankman	Newgrounds (Note: Tankman is the mascot of Newgrounds, but originates from a web series)	Johnny Utah
Vi	Bug Fables	Moonsprout Games

== Development ==
Fraymakers is being developed by McLeodGaming—the developers of Super Smash Flash 2—and Team Fray.

== Marketing and release ==
An early access version of Fraymakers was initially planned for release in 2022 and funded through a campaign on the crowdfunding platform Kickstarter in late 2020. The Kickstarter campaign raised over US$322,000. (Note: The initial funding target was US$46,000) In January 2023, the early access version was released on Linux, macOS, and Windows PC via the online storefront Steam. Fraymakers was planned to remain in early access for approximately two years before its full release. The early access version currently features six characters, five stages, and 23 assists. Post-release, an additional character is planned for release as downloadable content (DLC).
