= Super Smash Land =

2011 video game

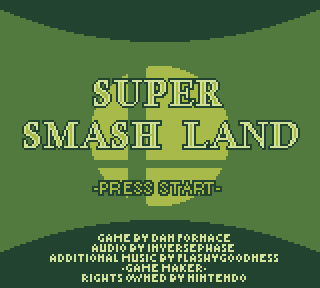
- Title screen
- Developer: Dan Fornace
- Publisher: Dan Fornace
- Programmer: Dan Fornace
- Artist: Dan Fornace
- Composers: Inverse Phase flashygoodness
- Series: Super Smash Bros. (unofficial)
- Engine: Game Maker 7
- Platform: Microsoft Windows
- Release: September 14, 2011
- Genre: Fighting

Super Smash Land is a fan-made demake of Super Smash Bros. released on September 14, 2011, by Dan Fornace. The game features six playable characters and 11 stages. The game's visual design resembles the graphics for the Game Boy and was developed with GameMaker 7.

== Gameplay ==
Super Smash Land is a platform fighter with gameplay is similar to Super Smash Bros.. Up to four players each choose one of the six playable characters, including Mario, Link, Kirby, Pikachu, Vaporeon and Mega Man. The objective is battling other characters and knocking them off the stage to win. Instead of knocking each other's health bar like in traditional fighting games, Super Smash Land has players to knock each other's percentage. The higher percent the player receives, the higher the chance of getting knocked out and losing a point. There is a lot of unlockable content in the game, including characters, stages, and game modes.

The game is controlled using the keyboard. There are "Arcade", "Endless", and "Versus" game modes where players can battle each other or fight hordes of AI enemies. There are 11 total stages including a stage from the game Tower of Heaven.

== Reception ==
Rock, Paper, Shotgun's Adam Smith, in his write-up of the game, called it "a fantastic homage" and a "fun game in its own right". JoyCon Gamers scored the game 9.0 recommending the game and calling it a trip down memory lane. Retro Gamer CD score the game 4 out of 5 on their review calling the game with "well made graphics" and entertaining gameplay. FleshEatingZipper's Keith gave the game an 8/10 stating that the game is old school and nostalgic.

== Spiritual successor ==
Rivals of Aether is a spiritual successor of Super Smash Land, created by the same developer. It features many of the elements of Super Smash Bros., including the advanced competitive techniques seen in Super Smash Bros. Melee.
