= Tower of Heaven =

2009 platforming video game

- Developer: Askiisoft
- Publisher: Askiisoft
- Designer: Justin Stander
- Programmer: Justin Stander
- Artist: Godsavant
- Composer: flashygoodness
- Engine: GameMaker 7, Flash
- Platforms: Windows, Browser
- Release: Windows: WW: August 13, 2009; Browser: WW: 2010
- Genre: Platform
- Mode: Single-player

Tower of Heaven (also rendered as 天国の塔 in Japanese, Tengoku no Tō in Hepburn) is a 2D platform video game developed by American studio Askiisoft. The game was built in GameMaker, and was released for Microsoft Windows in 2009, with a Flash version released in 2010.

The game was critically acclaimed and noted for its short length and difficulty.

== Gameplay ==
A typical level of the game, showing the first law that is given to the player to impede their progress.

In Tower of Heaven, the player controls Eid, a silent protagonist with a large, onion-like head, who scales the Tower of Heaven, a mysterious monolith that promises glory to those who scale it. During the journey, a voice assumed to be God talks to Eid, getting angrier the further he climbs. He gives Eid the Book of Laws. The voice imposes more and more laws, and the player dies instantly if any of them are broken. The game lacks a lives system, and instead uses a timer on each floor to encourage players to continue.

The game also includes a speedrun mode, where players are timed, and a stage editor mode for the Flash browser version, where players can create and play their own stages.

== Plot ==
The game begins in medias res, after Eid has entered the Tower of Heaven. A disembodied voice warns them of the danger in scaling the tower. When Eid continues, the voice explains that Eid will need to prove they are worthy by navigating various dangerous obstacles. After they successfully proceed deeper into the tower, the voice is surprised Eid survived, and decides to make things more "amusing" by giving them a stone tablet, the Book of Laws, that must be obeyed if the protagonist is not to be immediately smitten. In each subsequent room, it imposes various arbitrary laws, such as "thou shalt not walk left", and not being able to touch organic life such as butterflies and plants. As Eid continues to progress, the voice becomes more and more angry that Eid is able to circumvent the rules, calling Eid "covetous" and deserving of death. The Book of Laws shatters, and Eid navigates a final platforming challenge to reach the tower's peak. There, Eid meets a butterfly representing the deity-like being, which reacts with disdain that Eid has managed to plunder the riches of the tower. Saying it is "content", but that Eid cannot continue into heaven, the butterfly collapses the entire tower to the ground. The graphics switch to full color, showing the journal entry of a witness to Eid's journey to the tower.

== Development ==
Tower of Heaven's soundtrack, composed by FlashyGoodness, and graphical style are heavily influenced by the Game Boy, which was called "sly and deliberately deceptive" to hide the "brutal" difficulty.

== Reception ==
Tower of Heaven received positive reception from critics. In a preview, RetroGeek Mag recommended the game, praising its replayability and "catchy" soundtrack. In post-release impressions, Michael Rose of Indiegames.com called the game a "wonderful platformer" despite its difficulty. Joseph Leray of Destructoid called the game's soundtrack "absolutely killer", saying that it exposed the "arbitrariness" of long-standing platform game design by giving the Tower an in-universe source and ultimately revealing its design as artificial and in need of destruction. Fraser McMillan of Gamasutra called the game "almost more liberating" than open world AAA games, due to the fact that it makes quitting the game and the player's quest a perfectly valid option.

Tower of Heaven received a tribute in the form of a playable stage in the 2011 platform fighter Super Smash Land and its 2017 spiritual successor, Rivals of Aether. The stages feature a similar "law" mechanic to Tower of Heaven, where players who do not obey a law while it is active will take damage.

== See also ==
- Katana Zero
