= Katana Zero =

2019 video game

- Developer: Askiisoft
- Publisher: Devolver Digital
- Designer: Justin Stander
- Programmer: Justin Stander
- Writers: Eric Shumaker; Justin Stander
- Composers: Thijs Lodewijk; Bill Kiley
- Engine: GameMaker Studio 2
- Platforms: macOS; Nintendo Switch; Windows; Xbox One; Android; iOS
- Release: macOS, Switch, Windows; April 18, 2019; Xbox One; October 15, 2020; Android, iOS; May 21, 2024
- Genres: Platform, hack and slash
- Mode: Single-player

Katana Zero is a 2019 platform game developed by American indie studio Askiisoft and published by Devolver Digital. Set in a dystopian metropolis, the neo-noir storyline follows Subject Zero, a katana-wielding assassin with amnesia who can slow down time and predict the future. Zero unravels his past while completing assassination contracts. Katana Zero features side-scrolling hack-and-slash gameplay in which the player attempts to kill all enemies in a level without being hit, using Zero's abilities to manipulate time, dodge attacks, and take advantage of environmental hazards. In between levels, the story is told in sequences where the player converses with non-player characters through dialogue trees.

Katana Zero was conceptualized by video game designer Justin Stander, who began development of the game in 2013. He had previously developed freeware games under his studio Askiisoft, such as Tower of Heaven (2009), and conceived Katana Zero as his first commercial game. Using GameMaker Studio 2, Stander sought to make a difficult story-driven game that did not force the player to wait through dialogue and cutscenes. He focused on attention to detail and looked to films such as Sin City (2005) and John Wick (2014) for story inspiration. The development was prolonged and Stander worked mostly alone, although he recruited artists to design the visuals as well as musicians Bill Kiley and Thijs "LudoWic" Lodewijk to compose the synthwave soundtrack.

Katana Zero was released for macOS, Nintendo Switch and Windows on April 18, 2019. It sold 500,000 copies in less than a year and received positive reviews. Critics praised the gameplay—which they favorably compared to Devolver's Hotline Miami (2012)—and the visuals, writing, and music. The story divided reviewers and the unresolved ending was criticized. Several critics cited Katana Zero as one of the best independent games of 2019 and it was nominated for numerous year-end accolades.

Ports of Katana Zero were released for the Xbox One in 2020, and Android and iOS via Netflix Games in 2024. Downloadable content is in development and Stander intends to continue the fictional universe in future games.

== Gameplay ==
A GIF illustrating many of the core game mechanics of Katana Zero, including its use of bullet time and one-hit-kill gameplay

Katana Zero is a 2D platform and hack and slash game presented from a side-scrolling perspective. Controlling the player character, the katana-wielding assassin Subject Zero, the player completes assassination contracts for a psychiatrist. Zero can run, jump, wall kick, pick up and throw items, attack using his katana, and dodge. Zero's ability to slow down time and predict the future allows the player to activate a slow motion effect, enabling them to predict enemy movement easier, although use is limited by a meter that gradually refills. The game features eleven levels, which use Zero's precognition as a framing device; the player's attempts to complete each level are presented as possible scenarios Zero has foreseen.

Levels are split into several rooms, and the player must kill every enemy in a room using their sword, throwable objects, such as lamps and pots, or environmental hazards, such as lasers. Aside from occasional bosses, each enemy dies in a single hit. Certain levels feature unique game mechanics, such as a stealth mission in a nightclub, a motorcycle chase, and an alternate player character. Any damage results in instant death for Zero, requiring the player to restart from the most recent checkpoint. Katana Zero has been frequently compared to Hotline Miami (2012), as both feature levels filled with enemies, one-hit kills, and require players to determine their chosen route strategically. Outside of the main game, there are two additional game modes: hard mode features more difficult levels with new enemy varieties, reworked bosses, and additional challenges; and speedrun mode challenges the player to complete every level in the fastest time possible, with the options to modify enemy behavior and skip cutscenes.

=== Story and dialogue ===
Katana Zero follows a neo-noir-style storyline, with psychological horror and black comedy elements, set in a dystopian metropolis after a war. Subject Zero is an amnesiac veteran with precognitive abilities. He assassinates drug dealers and other targets (including a political prisoner) for his psychiatrist, who acts as his handler. The news media ascribes these killings to a serial killer known as the Dragon. Zero experiences recurring nightmares of a child, who he identifies as himself, in a hut. A scientist runs in, warns the child to hide, and is shot moments later by a soldier. He discusses his nightmares with the psychiatrist, who supplies him with a drug as treatment. Zero also befriends a young girl living next door to his apartment, and he becomes attached to her.

In between levels, the player converses with non-player characters (NPCs), such as the psychiatrist, the girl, and a Russian psychopath antagonist named V, who admires Zero's lethality. In a real-time dialogue tree system, the player chooses responses during conversations and can interrupt an NPC's dialogue at any time. Their decisions determine how much exposition is presented and how Zero is characterized; for example, Zero comes across as rude if the player repeatedly interrupts. Although they do not change the overall plot, players' dialogue choices can affect certain events, and one boss fight can only be activated by making specific decisions.

Zero and the psychiatrist's relationship becomes strained as the psychiatrist grows increasingly disagreeable and Zero suspects he is withholding information about the assassinations. Later, another clairvoyant swordsman, identifying himself as the actual "Dragon", dismembers and abducts V. Zero learns about his own past as a supersoldier known as a "NULL" and that the drug he had been taking, known as Chronos, gave him his abilities. However, it causes users to become trapped within their minds as a withdrawal symptom. Zero is tasked with eliminating the Dragon, but fails after encountering a similarly clairvoyant marksman, known as Headhunter, and is forced to kill intervening police - however, when he is eventually cornered, he is confronted by a pair of men wearing drama masks, who force him to choose whether to live at the cost of an unknown price or to die permanently at the hands of the police, with the latter leading to an alternate ending. Afterwards, Zero is tasked with destroying a bunker with confidential materials related to Chronos, and kills Headhunter. However, he ultimately spares the family hiding inside the Bunker, and, tired of being manipulated, kills the psychiatrist. The girl goes missing, presumably kidnapped by the masked men and the story ends on a cliffhanger. A flashback reveals Zero's nightmare is a memory from the war, and that he was the soldier who shot the scientist, and also worked with the Dragon, who was identified as Fifteen.

== Development ==
=== Conception ===
Katana Zero was developed over six years by the indie game creator Justin Stander under the studio name Askiisoft. It was Stander's first commercial game; his previous projects, such as Tower of Heaven (2009), had been smaller freeware games. After seeing the success of Terry Cavanagh's VVVVVV (2010), Stander concluded audiences only pay attention to indie games if they are being sold. Cavanagh, like Stander, had started off making freeware games, but none were as successful as VVVVVV. Katana Zero originated from Stander's desires to create a larger project that could be sold commercially and tell a story. He began working on it in 2013 as a hobby during his sophomore year at McGill University. He used the GameMaker Studio 2 game engine and spent the first two years building simple prototypes. The game was a means of expression for Stander outside schoolwork and he spent most of his time at college developing it.

After Stander graduated in 2015, he developed Katana Zero full time. He worked on multiple projects alongside it as a precaution since he felt the chances of success were slim. The total budget was US$60,000, which Stander noted was quite small for a game of Katana Zero's scope. He stated: "Most of it was just not paying myself at all and cutting down costs in my own life to do nothing but work on the game." Stander worked largely on his own, although he recruited help for the art and music. The game was initially developed for personal computers (macOS and Windows). Stander decided to develop a Nintendo Switch version immediately after the system was unveiled because he saw it as a good console for indie games. GameMaker made it easy to port Katana Zero and the long development meant it was already well optimized.

=== Design ===
One of Stander's goals was to make killing feel exciting and satisfying. He considered many modern games too forgiving, with enemies less powerful than the player. Finding it difficult to die in games such as Payday: The Heist (2011), Stander decided it would be easy to die in Katana Zero. He wanted the game to be difficult but fair and for the player to recognize and take responsibility for their mistakes. He continued his style of design—short levels filled with instant-death scenarios—from Tower of Heaven and Pause Ahead (2013). The one-hit-kill gameplay was frequently compared to another Devolver Digital-published game, Hotline Miami. Stander said he only played Hotline Miami once and did not remember its gameplay, but acknowledged it may have subconsciously influenced him. He named Samurai Gunn (2013), which he felt used one-hit kills effectively, as the bigger influence.

Stander wanted Katana Zero to feel cinematic and sought to subvert expectations: "As soon as you think you understand how this game is going to play out, then I just try to completely shift it on you... as soon as [you're] comfortable in [something], I try to shift things up. And I do that several times throughout the game. I really mess with the player." To maintain variety, he incorporated many enemy types, environmental traps, alternate level pathways, and set pieces. A minecart pathway inspired by Indiana Jones and the Temple of Doom (1984) took over a month to create. Stander looked to indie games that feature "tight, fast-paced, instant death combat" for inspiration, such as Trilby: The Art of Theft (2009) and Gunpoint (2013).

The art style was inspired by the neon lighting aesthetics associated with the 1980s. Recruiting artists proved challenging; Stander called himself "a terrible artist", and for two years no artists worked on the game. He found artists through the online independent developer community TIGSource, but said it was difficult to recruit high-quality pixel artists who would commit to the project. Many would only work on it for weeks or days before quitting for various reasons, such as other commitments or feeling their style did not match. Stander used the neon lighting to blend the artists' different styles. He considered being able to get an artist team to finish the game mere chance and credited the artists with motivating him to finish.

Stander focused on attention to detail and said adding a single mechanic, such as a gun turret, would require him to alter many different systems, such as the lighting, to maintain cohesion. Production value was important, as Stander wanted the engine to feel flawless. He said this meant "no bugs. Everything needs to feel like an extension of the player. When you play it, you should always feel like this is exactly what I wanted to do and that is what the character did." When developing small freeware games, he could scrutinize minute details, which would result in him spending a year to make a short, 20–30 minute game. Adapting this mentality to a full-length commercial game contributed to the prolonged development; Stander originally expected development to last a year or two. His focus on particulars demoralized him, to the point he made little progress for a year.

=== Writing ===
Stander said telling a story was a large part of his motivation to develop Katana Zero, wanting to celebrate his favorite tropes and provide his own spin on them. The script is credited to Stander and Eric Shumaker, with additional writing by Sterling Nathaniel Brown and Ian Goldsmith Rooney. As Stander developed Katana Zero focusing on one element at a time, he only had a basic plot summary by the time he finished outlining all the levels. Elements Stander conceived early on included a protagonist who was "sort of trapped in their situation, because those always make for good main characters in action games," and a disagreeable psychiatrist whom players would dislike.

Katana Zero is a pastiche of films Stander enjoyed. He was inspired by the Eastern culture of samurai cinema and wanted a vulnerable yet lethal protagonist similar to those from Korean revenge thrillers. Film influences included Oldboy (2003) Sin City (2005), Drive (2011), and John Wick for their "invincible-yet-human" protagonists and "stylistic violence set over a dark, grimy, neon coated setting," as well as Seven Samurai (1954) and the films of Quentin Tarantino. The story structure was inspired by Hotline Miami, in which the player character is directed to kill by mysterious phone calls, and its themes include drug addiction and mental health. Stander hesitated to deal with such topics as they had never affected him, but after some research, felt he could treat them respectfully. Stander said the script was rewritten around 30 times.

An example of Katana Zero's dialogue tree system. Stander conceived the system for a role-playing video game that he never developed and used graphical effects to emphasize major decisions.

Stander allowed the player to interrupt any line of spoken dialogue because many of the action games he grew up playing "would grind to a halt as the protagonist and the second banana argued about politics, or when the villain deigned to deliver a winding monologue." He considered this one of the biggest problems with cutscenes, as they strip players of their agency. Additionally, Stander felt an assassin like Zero would not wait to listen to a villain justify their schemes. He was conscious speedrunners would skip all the dialogue and included in-game consequences for interrupting constantly to create a sense of realism. He adopted a show-don't-tell approach to convey as much of the story, themes, and characters as possible through just visuals. A level in which the player controls the Dragon was intended to show the character's lethality without words.

The dialogue tree system originated from Stander's concept for a role-playing video game (RPG) that centered on limitlessness, allowing the player to interact with any object and fight any NPC. He wanted every action to have repercussions, which he likened to the Grand Theft Auto games. Although he never developed the RPG, Stander reincorporated the dialogue system in Katana Zero to keep the pacing consistent. Difficulty arose from finding the right timing between interrupting and responding. Playtesters would choose the wrong response if they interrupted too late, or unintentionally interrupt by taking too much time to respond. Stander resolved the problem using "coyote time", a trick in game development in which developers provide the player a brief interval to make their decision even if the on-screen window of opportunity has passed.

Stander kept the stakes for each dialogue choice minimal to reduce tension and make choosing a response feel natural. He noted "even the ones that seem big will peter out or resolve themselves," similar to Telltale Games' The Walking Dead series, such as an instance in which a decision will cause the player to temporarily lose their sword. However, he said "the way the story is told is entirely dependent on [the player's] choices," noting worldbuilding and character relationships can change depending on the dialogue options. For example, Zero's relationship with the psychiatrist suffers if the player ignores his orders, which can lead to alternate story paths in which Zero learns information he was not supposed to. Stander used graphical effects to emphasize major decisions, such as moving or colored text and character animations. He accomplished this by programming the script to affect other areas of the game upon reaching certain points. His initial intention was only to add polish, but he began to experiment and added elements such as distortion effects and screen-shaking.

=== Music ===
Katana Zero's synthwave score, which blends Chicago house, electronic music, and synth-pop, was composed by Bill Kiley and Thijs "LudoWic" Lodewijk, with additional music by Stander. Kiley had collaborated with Stander in the past and Stander recruited him to work on Katana Zero at the beginning of development. Lodewijk, who had never composed a video game, became involved in 2015, after Stander found his YouTube channel and recruited him to write a single track. Stander then asked if he could use music from Lodewijk's "jams" (improvised recording sessions Lodewijk had uploaded to his channel); the jam that first drew Stander's attention to Lodewijk, "Jam #12," was used as the boss theme. Lodewijk composed a track specifically for Stander after joining the project, but Stander told him to compose as he normally would.

Kiley and Lodewijk looked to 1980s electronic music for inspiration since the game's themes—including drug use and the effect of war on a nation's spirit—were relevant in the 1980s in the aftermath of the Vietnam War. They originally worked separately, as Stander wanted Kiley to write muted music for story-driven scenes and Lodewijk to write energetic music for the main levels. According to Kiley, "As the project progressed we gleefully broke this rule and ended up writing music for levels and story scenes all over the place." Kiley and Lodewijk attempted to reflect Zero's changing psyche and moods in their music, such as when Zero experiences Chronos withdrawal and snorts cocaine in a limousine. Kiley drew influence from the work of Gary Numan, Yellow Magic Orchestra, and Vangelis, and sought to evoke the feelings of 1980s action films.

Stander sent Kiley and Lodewijk screenshots, concept art, and notes describing the atmosphere he was aiming for, occasionally alongside an existing piece of music for reference. Lodewijk explained they would send their initial composition to Stander, leading to a series of exchanges that resulted in the final track. Some tracks ended up in different levels than intended, and for certain levels and dream sequences, Lodewijk wrote two tracks for Stander to blend in-game. Lodewijk composed most tracks in a single take, "[letting the music] go and sort of adjust[ing] it as it [went] along." He drew inspiration from Nine Inch Nails, as he and Stander were fans of their dark and industrial tone. Lodewijk did not set out to make dark music, but he noted his tracks were often somber, even when he attempted to compose happy music.

Kiley said he composed using the same monitors Richard "Disasterpeace" Vreeland used to compose Fez (2012), while Lodewijk used vintage synthesizers and drum machines such as the Akai MPC. While he did edit some tracks using his computer, Lodewijk described his process as "old-fashioned" and estimated 95% of his music was composed using vintage synths. Stander attempted to synchronize the music with the gameplay by having Zero turn on a Walkman at the beginning of each level, changing the music when Zero takes his earbuds out to talk to an NPC, and slowing down the music when the player uses Chronos.

== Release ==
Katana Zero made its first public appearance at PAX West in Seattle in September 2015. Adult Swim Games obtained the publication rights, and a teaser trailer was released in December. The game was scheduled for a late 2016 release, but it was delayed to 2017 and eventually to March 2019. Stander announced he had "amicably parted ways" with Adult Swim in December 2018, and revealed Devolver Digital had acquired the publication rights the following month. Devolver helped Stander localize the game, translating it to ten languages. Stander was impressed by Devolver's software testing process for catching bugs he did not notice.

Katana Zero was released on April 18, 2019, as a downloadable game on GOG.com, Humble Bundle, Nintendo eShop, and Steam. The Switch version was temporarily banned in Australia after it was refused classification by the International Age Rating Coalition, due to its depiction of graphic violence and drug use. Devolver Digital resubmitted the game to the Australian Classification Board, which cleared it for a May release with an R18+ rating.

A physical release for Katana Zero on Nintendo Switch was announced to be distributed by Limited Run Games in July 2020, with pre-orders then scheduled to open that November. As of January 2026, it has not been released.

=== Sales ===
Katana Zero was Devolver's most-preordered Switch game, sold over 100,000 copies within a week of release, and became Devolver's second-fastest-selling Switch game behind Enter the Gungeon (2017). It was the second-bestselling eShop game during the month following its release behind the Switch version of Cuphead (2017), which was released on the same day. Katana Zero sold 500,000 copies in less than a year and generated US$5 million in revenue. In contrast, the average indie game generates around US$16,000. Stander said Katana Zero was most successful on Switch and Steam; sales were originally strongest on Switch, but the Steam version gradually sold more since it went on sale often.

== Reception ==
Reception

Aggregate scores
Aggregator	Score
Metacritic	83/100
OpenCritic	87%

Review scores
Publication	Score
Destructoid	9/10
Game Informer	7.75/10
GameSpot	8/10
IGN	8.7/10
Nintendo Life	9/10
Nintendo World Report	9/10
PC Gamer (US)	79%
USgamer	4.5/5

Katana Zero received "generally favorable reviews" according to the review aggregate website Metacritic, and a "Mighty" approval rating from OpenCritic. Critics considered Katana Zero stylish and well designed. IGN said it "refines the tried and true one-hit-kill formula in a manner that makes it feels fresh, exciting, and innovative", while Nintendo Life and Nintendo World Report considered it a standout in the Nintendo eShop library. Destructoid's reviewer said Katana Zero was "bleak, beautiful, bloody, and brilliant" and changed how he viewed video games.

Critics praised the 16-bit visuals. They enjoyed the retro VHS aesthetic and visual effects—though some wrote their intensity could induce headaches—as well as the amount of detail in the sprites and animations. IGN found the lighting effects impressive and said they worked with the "slick neon aesthetic and fantastic sprite work" to give the game personality. GameSpot appreciated that Katana Zero did not use a retro aesthetic simply for nostalgia, and alongside Polygon found the detailed sprite work and smooth animations added emotional weight.

The soundtrack was acclaimed. Destructoid called it an "audial delight" and Nintendo Life's reviewer said the music overshadowed the rest of the game at points. He felt the soundtrack had a clear focus but remained "willing to experiment with obscure genres" and complimented the composers for doing something original in contrast to the "cliché" chiptune style prevalent in indie games. IGN said the soundtrack was excellent and fitting, and PC Gamer liked how it was contextualized in the world.

Although reviewers praised the writing, they were divided on the story. Destructoid noted it was difficult to discuss since much is left to the player's interpretation. Shacknews praised the plot twists, and GameSpot said the story did a good job balancing graphic violence with "delicately quiet character moments and some heartfelt relationships". Some commended how the story provided context for the slow-motion game mechanic, and others thought it had heart. However, PC Gamer found the plot generic dystopian fiction with stock characters, while Game Informer felt it had interesting ideas but "most of them just cryptically meander without reaching any crescendo". Multiple reviewers disliked the ending, which they called abrupt, and felt teased story moments lacked payoffs. GameSpot found this problematic since a sequel was not guaranteed.

The dialogue system was considered creative and innovative. Reviewers said the branching dialogue paths and alternate story scenarios added replay value. The graphical effects used to emphasize dialogue were praised for adding emotional weight to conversations. Destructoid and Nintendo Life said the dialogue system helped make the story interesting, and Polygon wrote it helped the player build an emotional connection with Zero. Minor criticism came from IGN, which said many story deviations felt superficial, leading to later choices feeling inconsistent with those made earlier. Nonetheless, IGN said the dialogue system was entertaining and encouraged multiple playthroughs.

Critics enjoyed the fast, fluid gameplay, which they frequently compared to Hotline Miami. Rock, Paper, Shotgun and IGN said the influences were obvious, but this was not a problem. IGN said the controls were "empoweringly flexible" and Nintendo Life said it felt great to learn them. Reviewers frequently compared Katana Zero to a puzzle game, requiring the player to strategize and plan. They said this made completing each level feel satisfying, with Game Informer considering the trial-and-error process of polishing movements "the most entertaining part of [the game]". Conversely, Polygon felt the gameplay, while good, did not live up to the presentation, and that the puzzle-like design made the game feel limited. The short length was noted, but IGN and Nintendo Life said it worked in the game's favor since it meant there was no filler.

Reviewers said the player character's abilities were static and limited. While Game Informer said this was a problem, USgamer found the game was "all about playing with those scant toys", and PC Gamer felt they were "adaptable enough to make the combat encounters varied". GameSpot, USgamer, Destructoid, and IGN felt the gameplay stayed interesting with its set pieces and variety of enemy types, though Game Informer disagreed. IGN's reviewer said the Chronos slow motion mechanic was his favorite element since it was powerful but still limited, and Nintendo Life described the process of balancing Chronos use throughout the levels as exciting. Destructoid praised how enemies never reset to their original position after deaths, although Game Informer considered this an annoyance.

=== Accolades ===
Katana Zero was among the top 50 highest-rated games on Metacritic in 2019, and was named one of the best games of 2019 by USgamer (#1), Thrillist (#21), and Red Bull. IGN nominated it for "Best Action Game" and "Best Video Game Music/Soundtrack" during its Best of 2019 Awards. For his work on the game, Stander was included in Forbes' 2020 30 Under 30 list.

Year	Award	Category	Result	Ref(s).
2019	2019 SXSW Gaming Awards	Gamer's Voice: Video Game	Nominated	
2019	The Game Awards 2019	Best Independent Game	Nominated	
2020	Independent Games Festival Awards	Excellence in Design	Nominated	
2020	2020 SXSW Gaming Awards	Most Promising New Intellectual Property	Nominated	
2020	16th British Academy Games Awards	Debut Game	Nominated	

== Post-release ==
=== Ports ===
Devolver released an Xbox One version of Katana Zero on October 15, 2020, offered to Xbox Game Pass subscribers, and an Amazon Luna version on December 9, 2021. A PlayStation 4 version was rated by the Entertainment Software Rating Board in March 2021, but has not been released as of September 2022.

Android and iOS ports were released on May 21, 2024. The ports were published by Netflix as part of its expansion into video games; while free to download, they require an active Netflix subscription to play. The ports received positive reviews from Pocket Gamer and TouchArcade, who felt the game remained high quality on mobile platforms. However, Pocket Gamer said the controls did not transition well to a touchscreen due to the precision and reflexes Katana Zero requires.

=== Downloadable content and future ===
On April 25, 2019, a week after Katana Zero's release, Stander announced he was working on free downloadable content (DLC). He wanted the DLC's quality to be on par with the main game's, and its size expanded considerably during development. The DLC was three times its originally-planned size by February 2020, and six times by March 2021, though this did not change Stander's plans to release it for free. The DLC will be slightly more than half the size of the base game and will introduce new game mechanics, enemies, and story elements. Stander described it as "more like Katana 1.5 " than DLC. He said the DLC will resolve some plot threads and continue the worldbuilding, but will not complete the story. Stander plans to continue the story beyond the DLC and has its conclusion planned. In May 2020, he said some of his future games would connect to its fictional universe. Video teasers for the DLC were released in April 2025 during The Triple-i Initiative and in October 2026.
