= Brawlhalla =

2017 video game

- Standard edition box art
- Developer: Blue Mammoth Games
- Publishers: Blue Mammoth Games (2017-2018); Ubisoft (2018-present)
- Engine: Adobe AIR
- Platforms: macOS, PlayStation 4, Windows, Nintendo Switch, Xbox One, Android, iOS
- Release: macOS, PlayStation 4, Windows: WW: October 17, 2017; Nintendo Switch, Xbox One: WW: November 6, 2018; Android, iOS: WW: August 6, 2020
- Genre: Platform fighter
- Modes: Single-player, multiplayer

Brawlhalla is a free-to-play platform fighting game developed by Blue Mammoth Games. It was originally released for macOS, PlayStation 4 and Windows in 2017, with ports for Nintendo Switch, Xbox One, Android and iOS released later. Full cross-play is supported across all platforms. The game was shown at PAX East in April 2014 and went into alpha later that month. An open beta became available in November 2015, followed by the game's full release in October 2017. The game features 70 playable characters, referred to as "Legends", each with unique stats, varied loadouts, and cosmetic skins and crossovers.

On March 5, 2018, Brawlhalla developer-publisher Blue Mammoth Games was acquired by the video game publisher Ubisoft. As a result of this, Ubisoft took over publishing duties and Rayman, alongside two other characters from the franchise, were added to the game on November 6, 2018. Brawlhalla was released for Nintendo Switch and Xbox One on the same day. On July 27, 2022, Ezio from Assassin's Creed became the second playable crossover character, alongside one other character from the franchise.

On July 6, 2018, Ars Technica released an article detailing precise player counts for Steam games obtained through a leak as a result of a "hole" in its API. This leak showed Brawlhalla to be ranked 24th in player count on Steam with a total of 8,646,824 players, out of all games featuring the Steam Achievements system. The Android version has more than 10 million downloads. Ubisoft reported more than 20 million players by February 2019. In April 2022, Brawlhalla achieved 80 million players.

== Gameplay ==
In most of Brawlhalla's game modes, the goal is to knock one's opponent into one of four areas outside of the visual boundaries of the map referred to as blastzones, similar to Super Smash Bros. This can be done either by forcing them into one of the blastzones with an attack, or by preventing them from returning to stage and allowing gravity to force them into the bottom blastzone. Damage can be seen on the color display around each player's character icon, which darkens progressively from white to red to black as the character continues to get hit. The darker the color is, the farther the character will be knocked back when hit until a hit forces them into a blastzone. Entering a blastzone will result in the player losing a stock and their character respawning on stage. Either the last player with at least one stock or the player with the most points wins the match, depending on the game mode.

The game supports both local and online play. Competitive players can compete in 1-on-1 to climb through the rankings. They can also find a partner to play against other duos to increase their collaborative rank in either the standard stock game mode queue or a rotating queue that features a different game mode each season. Brawlhalla also has several casual modes: Free-For-All, 1v1 Strikeout, Experimental 1v1, and a different featured mode every week. Free-For-All is a chaotic mode where 4 players knock each other out to gain points. In 1v1 Strikeout, players pick 3 characters which they play for 1 stock each. Experimental 1v1 allows players to test out upcoming features against each other. Custom games can be hosted online and locally, and they support up to 8 players per match, experimental maps, and region changing. You may join groups of your friends to create a clan, with multiple ranks within the clans. Clans are only available on PC. Clans gain experience from all members.

Brawlhalla features simple controls and one-button special moves. This allows new players to pick up the game quickly. Controls include movement keys and buttons for attacking, performing special moves, picking up or throwing weapons, and dodging. Keys can be rebound for the keyboard and a large variety of controllers.

Players can move by running left and right and jumping. Players can perform quick dashes sideways on the ground and dodges in the air or on the ground, either sideways or vertically. It is also possible to dodge right after an attack to keep pressure on the opponent. Once in the air, the player has the option to perform any combination of three jumps, a directional air-dodge, a grounded move in the air by using a "gravity-cancel", and "fast-falling". It is also possible to hold on to the sides of stages, similar to the style in Mega Man X.

During a match, gadgets (which can be switched off in the ranked game modes) and weapon drops fall from the sky semi-randomly and can be picked up by the players. Although the weapon drop sprite has the appearance of a sword it turns into a corresponding weapon for the legend that picks it up. All of Brawlhalla's characters can use 2 weapons out of 15 to fight each other. Weapons include blasters, katars, rocket lance, sword, spear, cannon, axe, gauntlets, hammer, bow, scythe, orb, greatsword, battle boots, and chakram. Blasters, rocket lances, bows, and spears perform well at a distance from the opponent, while katars and gauntlets are more effective up close. Rocket lance allows for quick traversal of the stage. Cannon, greatsword, and hammer all do large amounts of damage. Sword, orb, katars and battle boots are fast and low damaging. As chakram also does well at a distance, unlike others, it can split into two if the user holds down and attacks. All characters have unarmed attacks, should they be disarmed. Gadgets like bombs, mines, and spike balls are also used. Weapons can also be thrown to interrupt the enemy's moves or to make it difficult for them to get back to the stage. Each character has 3 special or "signature" moves per weapon, for a total of 6 per character.

Four stats are assigned to each character: Strength, Dexterity, Defense, and Speed, each with a rating up to 10 (maximum 22). The combination of these stats determines the strengths and weaknesses of a character and affects how they're played, and can be slightly modified using stances- which move a point from one stat to another.

== Business model ==
Brawhalla is free-to-play, based on the freemium business model. The game offers 9 selectable characters to use for free from a weekly rotation, making it more accessible for newer players. This number of free rotation characters increased from 6 in late 2018 to 8 in August 2020. There are currently 70 player characters, called "Legends" (as of March 2025). To fully purchase characters, Brawlhalla offers an in-game shop, giving a chance for players to use the in-game currency earned through matches, daily missions, and level-ups. Alternatively, players can purchase all existing and future characters via a one-time transaction of $39.99.

Other products are also available to purchase here, using a premium currency called Mammoth Coins. Mammoth coins are named after the developing studio Blue Mammoth Games, and are only obtainable through in-game purchases. Mammoth coins can be used for products such as character skins, podiums, KO effects, weapon skins, avatars, sidekicks, and emotes that can be used in matches. Character skins come with two matching weapon skins, which may be used on any character that uses that weapon. Also in the shops are skin chests, being updated every 2 days. There are 21 themed chests, which offer many of the skins purchasable within the shop at a discounted price while offering 2 to 3 skins exclusive to the chest. These chests cost 100 Mammoth Coins to purchase and will randomly give the purchaser one of the skins offered. Excluding chests, any purchases made in the shop can be refunded for up to 90 days after the purchase, but players are limited to only 3 refunds per account. Refunds are not exclusive to purchases made with premium currencies.

Brawlhalla has also introduced a battle pass system with 85 tiers of exclusive skins, emotes, and colors. The battle pass system has a weekly set of missions to be completed during matches, which range from straightforward tasks such as KOing with certain weapons to missions based on the in-universe lore. Completing each mission awards the player with "Battle Gems". Gems can also be obtained from ordinary daily missions, and a random number of either 2, 6, or 12 will be awarded after a player obtains a certain amount of XP from playing matches. The XP needed for each set of gems increases the more times a player has obtained the gems. Every 12 gems unlock a new tier of rewards on the reward track. The battle pass features both a free and a premium reward track. The premium track can be purchased for $9.99, and comes with a larger number of rewards. Character skins are exclusive to the premium track. The deluxe pass was added into Brawlhalla, offering an additional 25 tiers to the premium and free reward track. The Deluxe pass costs US$24.99 or $14.99 if the premium pass is already owned.

== Cross-play ==
Brawlhalla introduced cross-play across all platforms on October 9, 2019. Cross-play allows players on PC, Nintendo Switch, PlayStation 4, PlayStation 5, Xbox One, Xbox Series S/X, Android and iOS to queue against each other in online ranked play and to create custom lobbies which a player on any platform can join.

== Playable characters ==
Playable characters in Brawlhalla are referred to as "Legends", each with different stats, weapons, and cosmetic skins. As of September 2026, there are 70 playable characters in total, up from 34 at official launch.

	Blasters	Boots	Bow	Cannon	Chakram	Gauntlets	Greatsword	Hammer	Katars	Lance	Orb	Scythe	Spear	Sword
Axe	Barraza	/	Azoth	Xull	/	Rayman	Imugi	Teros	Ragnir	Ulgrim	/	Volkov	Brynn	Jhala
Blasters		Vivi	Diana	Isaiah	/	Cross	/	Cassidy	Lucien	Lord Vraxx	Reno	Nix	Ada	Thatch
Boots			/	/	/	Tezca	/	King Zuva	/	Thea	Red Raptor	/	/	/
Bow				/	Ransom	Zariel	/	Yumiko	Ember	Vector	/	Munin	Kaya	Koji
Cannon					/	Onyx	/	/	Lin Fei	/	Qinghua & Baobao	/	Seven	Sidra
Chakram						/	/	/	/	/	/	Lady Vera	Aurus	Priya
Gauntlets							/	Kor	Caspian	/	Petra	Mordex	Wu Shang	Val
Greatsword								Magyar	Mako	/	/	/	Arcadia	Jaeyun
Hammer									Sentinel	Scarlet	Thor	/	Gnash	Bödvar
Katars										Rupture	/	Loki	Queen Nai	Asuri
Lance											/	Artemis	Orion	Sir Roland
Orb												Fait	Dusk	Ezio
Scythe													Mirage	Jiro
Spear														Hattori

=== Crossover characters ===
Many characters have skins that serve as crossover characters from other franchises. These characters can only be obtained through "mammoth coins" and not normal coins. They remain available in Brawlhalla's store even after the crossover event ends. Some crossovers may come on sale during special promotional events. The franchises and characters are as follows:

Adventure Time

- Finn
- Jake
- Princess Bubblegum

Assassin's Creed

- Ezio Auditore da Firenze (Note: Appears as a playable character, not a crossover skin)
- Eivor Varinsdottir

Attack on Titan

- Eren Yeager
- Mikasa Ackerman
- Levi Ackerman

Avatar: The Last Airbender

- Aang
- Zuko
- Toph

Ben 10

- Four Arms
- Diamondhead
- Heatblast

Borderlands

- Krieg
- Lilith
- Tiny Tina

Castlevania

- Alucard
- Simon Belmont

Destiny

- Hunter
- Warlock
- Titan

G.I. Joe

- Snake Eyes
- Storm Shadow

Halo

- Master Chief
- Arbiter

Hellboy

- Hellboy
- Gruagach
- Daimio
- Nimue

Kung Fu Panda

- Po
- Tigress
- Tai Lung

Mega Man

- Mega Man

My Hero Academia

- Izuku Midoriya
- Katsuki Bakugo
- Shoto Todoroki

Rivals of Aether

- Ranno

Rayman

- Rayman
- Globox
- Barbara

Shovel Knight

- Shovel Knight
- Black Knight
- King Knight
- Plague Knight
- Specter Knight
- Enchantress

Shrek

- Shrek
- Princess Fiona
- Puss in Boots

SpongeBob SquarePants

- SpongeBob SquarePants
- Patrick Star
- Sandy Cheeks

Star Wars

- Anakin Skywalker
- Obi-Wan Kenobi
- Ahsoka Tano
- Darth Vader
- Darth Maul
- Han Solo
- Chewbacca
- Kay Vess
- Din Djarin
- General Grievous
- Luke Skywalker

Steven Universe

- Stevonnie
- Pearl
- Amethyst
- Garnet

Street Fighter

- Ryu
- Ken
- Chun-Li
- Sakura
- Dhalsim
- Luke
- M. Bison
- Akuma

Teenage Mutant Ninja Turtles

- Leonardo
- Donatello
- Raphael
- Michelangelo

Tekken

- Devil Jin
- Nina Williams
- Yoshimitsu

The Walking Dead

- Rick Grimes
- Michonne
- Daryl Dixon
- Maggie Greene
- Negan

Tomb Raider

- Lara Croft

WWE

- The Rock
- John Cena
- Xavier Woods
- Becky Lynch
- Macho Man
- The Undertaker
- Asuka
- Roman Reigns

== Esports ==
While minor events have been held by the community since its closed beta launch, Blue Mammoth Games now hosts its official competitive events.

In May 2016, they led off with the Brawlhalla Championship Series or "BCX". It was a series of 21 weekly online tournaments starting on June 18. The Brawlhalla World Championship is a tournament held by Blue Mammoth Games at their end-of-the-year event, BCX (Brawlhalla Championship Expo). The event took place at the Cobb Galleria in Atlanta in the United States. Players competed locally from November 11–13. The World Championship was separated into two separate open tournaments (1v1 and 2v2).

In 2017, Blue Mammoth Games announced the 'Brawlhalla Circuit, a worldwide circuit of tournaments. Players are awarded Points. Players with the highest points from each region at the end of the season will earn a spot in the World Championship in November. The Brawlhalla World Championship became an annual event in 2017. The event once again took place at the Cobb Galleria in Atlanta in the United States where players competed locally on November 3–5.

At the start of 2018, Blue Mammoth Games announced their third year of official tournaments. This included a partnership with DreamHack to host 6 in-person tournaments throughout the year, including official tournaments in Europe. The 3rd annual Brawlhalla World Championship was an open tournament with players being seeded based on official tournament power rankings. It took place on November 16–18 inside DreamHack Atlanta. The championship was played alongside tournaments of other popular fighting games, such as Super Smash Bros. Melee, Dragon Ball FighterZ and Tekken 7.

In 2019, Blue Mammoth Games planned to host 5 in-person tournaments at their events throughout the year. The 4th annual Brawlhalla World Championship took place at DreamHack Atlanta.

In more recent competition the Brawlhalla Pro Series (North America) was a weekly event that started April 9, 2019 and ended May 4, 2019.

In 2020, Brawlhalla Esports shifted to an online-focused competition due to the global pandemic. The 5th annual Brawlhalla World Championship was shifted to an online competition due to the Coronavirus pandemic. Thus, the World Championship was split into five separate regions, with each region having their own 1v1 and 2v2 BCX Champions.

Since 2022, the World Championship has returned to being an in-person event.

From 2023 to 2025, Brawlhalla hosted Royales. The top performers from each online seasonal major were invited to an in-person tournament.

Brawlhalla World Champions
Year	1v1 Champion	1v1 Runner-Up	2v2 Champion	2v2 Runner-Up	Ref.
2016	LDZ	Maltimum	Diakou and Twilight	LDZ and Stevenator	
2017	LDZ	Addymestic	Boomie and Remmy	Addymestic and Cake	
2018	Sandstorm	Wrenchd	Addymestic and Cake	Aggz0 and VipR3	
2019	Sandstorm	Simple	Boomie and Sandstorm	Lil Capped and Ithrowow	
2020	No unified World Champion due to COVID-19				
2021	No unified World Champion due to COVID-19				
2022	Impala	Godly	Boomie and Snowy	Fozey and Godly	
2023	Yüz	Kyna	Godly and Zen	Acno and Blaze	
2024	Yüz	Kyna	Kyna and Lores	Experience and Zen	
2025	Marckiemoo	BalloonBoy	Hideaway and Zen	Acno and Mounir	
2026	BalloonBoy	Godly	Moni and Shira	BalloonBoy and Mounir	

Brawlhalla Royale Champions
Season	Champion	Runner-Up
Winter 2023	Luna	Raydish
Spring 2023	Yüz	Godly
Summer 2023	Kyna	Godly
Autumn 2023	Lores	Godly
Spring 2024	Kyna	Lores
Autumn 2024	Marckiemoo	Yüz
Winter 2025	V3M_T4NQUIL0	Marckiemoo
Spring 2025	Marckiemoo	Godly
Summer 2025	Mounir	Marckiemoo
Autumn 2025	Ahmet	Marckiemoo

== Community ==
One factor that is critical to the longevity of a game is whether the players feel that their opinions are being heard by the developers. One way for a developer to demonstrate that they are listening to their community is through frequent updates that tailor the game to the needs of the community and maintain a playable state. A study that focused on 'urgent updates', which are defined as updates that, "... are deemed critical enough to not be left unreleased until an upcoming regular-cycle update," found that for Steam's top games, including Brawlhalla, 39% of these 'urgent updates' were to fix crashes, and 25% made changes to the games' rules. The developer of Brawlhalla, Blue Mammoth Games, frequently uses the community's feedback to make changes to their game. It was especially common earlier in the development of the game for there to be a section included in the patch notes titled 'Community Requests'.

== Reception ==
Reception

Review scores
Publication	Score
Nintendo Life	70
PCMag	70
Push Square	70
Metro GameCentral	80
Multiplayer.it	80

Award
Publication	Award
Google Play Awards 2020 Best Competitive Game	Nominated

Kotaku summarized that "Brawlhalla is a dynamic take on platform brawler that feels good to play." They said that the best innovations to the platform brawlers before it are its jumps and wall movements. Three jumps and nearly unlimited wall scaling make for fresh strategies and the buff in mobility means a lot of the high-adrenaline action happens off-stage. Push Square stated that while it is not quite as tightly designed as the seminal Super Smash Bros., the large roster, a wide range of modes, and a reasonable level of depth help it achieve a similar balance of accessibility and challenge, scoring it at 7 out of 10. Nintendo Life said that it "stands as a solid example of how to do a proper platform fighter, with several game modes, a diverse cast and a beautiful art style making this one easy to recommend." PCMag summarised it as "a worthwhile entry in the platform fighting genre that you can enjoy for free."

On the PlayStation store chart, it was the 2nd most downloaded game in North America, and number 3 in Europe.
