= Ittle Dew =

- Developer: Ludosity
- Publisher: Ludosity
- Platforms: Wii-U, Nintendo Switch, Ouya, Windows, Mac-OS, Linux Android, iOS
- Release: July 7, 2013
- Genres: Action-Adventure, Indie
- Mode: Single-Player

Ittle Dew is a puzzle action-adventure video game released by indie developer Ludosity. it was released on July 7, 2013.

== Plot ==
The game follows protagonist Ittle and her companion Tippsie as they get stranded on an island. They find a shopkeeper who can sell them a raft, and need to solve puzzles, fight enemies, and find treasure from the various dungeons on the island in order to buy the raft and escape.

== Gameplay ==
The game is in an overhead perspective, reminiscent of games like The Legend of Zelda. It consists of an overworld connecting multiple dungeons, where most of the gameplay takes place. the player solves puzzles and fights enemies to find treasure and items necessary to solve other puzzles.

== Reception ==
Reviews of Ittle Dew were generally favorable, with a 79% on Metacritic, 100% positive reviews, and an audience score of 7.2. It was praised for its sarcastic humor and creative puzzles. Although some thought the puzzles were tedious and the game was too short, and praised its sequel Ittle Dew 2. for solving these problems.
