= Super Street Fighter =

Super Street Fighter is the beginning of the title of several games in the Street Fighter series. While there was not a "super" version created for the original game, sequels picked up the adjective:

- Super Street Fighter II
- Super Street Fighter II Turbo
- Super Street Fighter II Turbo HD Remix
- Super Street Fighter IV
