= Space Systems Finland =

Space Systems Finland Oy
- Type: Osakeyhtiö
- Industry: software, systems
- Founded: 1989
- Headquarters: Espoo, Finland
- Key people: Veera Sylvius (CEO)
- Revenue: 7.1 M€ (2017)
- Number of employees: 63 (2017)
- Website: ssf.fi

Space Systems Finland (SSF) is a Finnish software and systems engineering company. Since its founding in 1989, the company has developed software and systems for several European Space Agency spacecraft.

SSF develops software and systems for customers in aerospace, defense, medical, machinery, and nuclear industries. Approximately half of the company's revenue come from space projects, and the remaining half from terrestrial projects. Since 2016, the company has expanded into internet of things development and data science.

== History ==
SSF was founded in 1989 to develop software for Finnish space projects ongoing at that time. Initially, the company also manufactured electronics for space use, but later focused on developing space software. In 1998, SSF was mentioned as the only Finnish company focusing in space technology.

In addition to space software, the company has implemented safety-critical software for other domains such as heavy machinery, medical technology, and nuclear industry. SSF has also developed navigation technologies related to Galileo and signal simulators for testing GNSS receivers.

== Projects ==
Flight and ground software for the GOMOS instrument of Envisat, launched in 2002, was developed by SSF.

SSF has developed pseudolite-based navigation technologies for areas where GNSS signals are weak or not available.

From 2003 to 2008, SSF developed main flight software for the Herschel and Planck space telescopes, both launched in 2009. The software was responsible for controlling and monitoring most spacecraft functions, including e.g. fault detection and correction, thermal control, and resource management.

The company developed main flight software for the GOCE spacecraft, operated from 2009 to 2013, and helped solve a major communications malfunction in the satellite in July 2010.

SSF has developed flight and ground software for the European MetOp weather satellite programmes. SSF has also supported the development of the Aalto-1 nanosatellite.

Recovery software for the Rosalind Franklin rover, to be launched in the mid- or late 2020s, has been developed by SSF. The software can be used to analyze the rover state and relay updates to the main rover software.

In early 2018, SSF was selected to develop the main software for the PLATO space telescope.
