= Super Smash Flash =

Browser game series

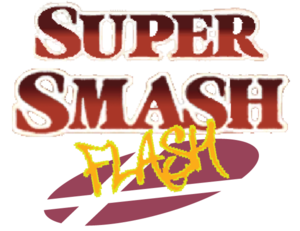
- Logo for the original Super Smash Flash
- Genre: Fighting
- Developer: SSF2 Team
- Publisher: McLeodGaming
- Creator: Gregory McLeod
- Platforms: Microsoft Windows, macOS, Linux, Adobe Flash
- First release: Super Smash Flash; August 21, 2006
- Latest release: Super Smash Flash 2 Beta 1.4.0.1; May 13, 2025

Super Smash Flash is a series of fighting browser games published by McLeodGaming, led by Greg McLeod under the alias Cleod9. It is based on the Super Smash Bros series. The original Super Smash Flash is specifically based on Super Smash Bros. Melee. Its follow-up, also considered a reboot, is Super Smash Flash 2. The developer is currently working on an original crossover fighting game, Fraymakers.

== Gameplay ==
Screenshot of Super Smash Flash 2, showing Mario, Kirby, Lloyd Irving and Ichigo Kurosaki fighting on the Battlefield stage

Like in the official Super Smash Bros. games, the objective is to knock opponents off the screen. Players are given a percentage counter instead of a health bar, which increases as they take damage. A higher damage percentage means that attacks will send the player further, which may ultimately lead to a KO.

The games are not direct clones of the official games, since they feature adjusted mechanics and playable content and both stages and characters. Some characters are not present in the original Super Smash Bros. series by virtue of being a fan made project.

In the original Super Smash Flash, characters only have a total of five attacks each, activated by pressing the "P" key along with an arrow key, and some characters had an extra attack while jumping. The reboot, Super Smash Flash 2, offers controls much more similar to those of the official games. Along with the option to use a keyboard like its predecessor, SSF2 adds support for external game controllers and other gaming devices that can be used for computers.

As with the official Super Smash Bros. games, both Super Smash Flash and Super Smash Flash 2 include several single-player modes, such as campaigns to defeat a series of computer-controlled opponents, events that have specific goals to clear, minigames to test the player, etc. The player receives numerous rewards and other collectibles by clearing single-player modes.

The original game features three single-player modes. In Regular Match, the player can choose between Classic and Adventure Modes; once the whole roster has been unlocked, All-Star Mode becomes available. In Stadium, several minigames and challenges are presented to the player such as destroying eight targets with each character's own abilities in Target Test or defeating grey-shaded versions of the playable roster in Multi-Man Melee. In Training Mode, the player can tune up their skills by setting several parameters of their own.

The reboot expands the single-player experience. Classic Mode, for instance, has a greater variety of opponents. All-Star Mode features a fixed order of opponents fought and more opponents per match. For Stadium, Target Test has been renamed Target Smash and features four selectable levels with a set pattern for targets on each level, as well as a fifth specially designed level for every character that tests their own abilities to destroy the targets. Multi-Man Melee has been renamed Multi-Man Smash and the player now confronts black-palette versions of Mario, Link, Kirby, and Pikachu, all of whom have very limited movesets and high stamina. A missing Stadium sub-mode from the official games that is absent from the original SSF gets reincorporated: Home-Run Contest, where the objective is to launch the Sandbag as far as possible by racking up its damage. The player can enable and disable a protective barrier that prevents the sandbag from leaving the main platform, unless it is launched hard enough to break it. A new original Stadium sub-mode to be incorporated is Crystal Smash, where the objective is to destroy a multitude of crystals as quickly as possible. An Event Mode is also implemented, where the player must complete specific missions or defeat certain characters to accomplish the event. There are a total of 51 events to complete.

=== Multiplayer ===
Both Super Smash Flash and Super Smash Flash 2 feature standard multiplayer battles against other players on the same machine and against computer-controlled characters with configurable difficulty levels.

The original game was very limited by its software Flash potential. Aside from only one multiplayer mode (coined as Melee mode), matches were limited to two human players per match. The other remaining two slots could only be filled with CPU players. The camera was only able to follow player one, leaving player two at a noticeable disadvantage.

SSF2 expanded the multiplayer mode by introducing four player-entries controlled by human players and a dynamic camera system. Version 0.9b introduced Special Smash, a mode similar to the official Super Smash Bros. games in which certain "game modifiers" like Mini (shrinks all characters), Slow (lowers the game speed), Turbo (allows any attack to be cancelled on hit, directly taken with permission from fellow fan game Project M), or Super Smash Flash (recreates the quirky and glitchy engine of the original game such as attacks hitting once per frame, activating no hitlag, characters become unable to hold onto ledges, etc.) can be applied to matches. The Beta version introduced an original mode called Arena Mode, which enabled the player to participate in some minigames with the existing physics and characters in unorthodox-for-the-series ways using the Sandbag, much like Stadium on the single-player mode. There are currently two known sub-modes. The first is called Sandbag Soccer, in which players are placed in an enclosed stage sorted to two teams, red and blue, and have to get the Sandbag into the opposing team's goal. The first team that reaches the number of goals set prior to the match wins. The other is called Sandbag Basketball and features a similar premise to the former, except players now have to get the Sandbag to pass through the opposing team's hoop to score.

Ever since demo version 0.9b of SSF2, players can fight against opponents online through a proprietary system dubbed the "McLeodGaming Network". Connections use the proprietary Adobe RTMFP technology unless the "high latency" setting is chosen, which hands players off to a server rather than using a P2P connection.

=== Playable characters ===
The original Super Smash Flash features 30 characters. These characters represent a wide variety of media, spanning not only video games, but also manga, animated film, and fan-made creations. Like in the Super Smash Bros. series, a number of these characters must be "unlocked" through various means.

Super Smash Flash 2 Beta currently features 48 playable characters. As the game is still in development, this number is subject to change. Fan-made newcomers from the previous game will not reappear due to the developers wanting to give a more professional tone.

Fighter	Flash	Flash 2	Franchise
Bandana Dee	No	Yes	Kirby
Black Mage	No	Yes	Final Fantasy
Blade	Yes	No	McLeodGaming
Blue	Yes	No	McLeodGaming
Bomberman	No	Yes	Bomberman
Bowser	No	Yes	Super Mario
Captain Falcon	Yes	Yes	F-Zero
Chibi-Robo	No	Yes	Chibi-Robo!
Cloud	Yes	No	Final Fantasy
Crono	Yes	No	Chrono
Donkey Kong	No	Yes	Donkey Kong
Falco	No	Yes	Star Fox
Fox	Yes	Yes	Star Fox
Ganondorf	No	Yes	The Legend of Zelda
Goku	No	Yes	Dragon Ball
Ichigo	No	Yes	Bleach
Inuyasha	Yes	No	Inuyasha
Isaac	No	Yes	Golden Sun
Jigglypuff	Yes	Yes	Pokémon
King Dedede	No	Yes	Kirby
Kirby	Yes	Yes	Kirby
Knuckles	Yes	No	Sonic the Hedgehog
Krystal	No	Yes	Star Fox
Link	Yes	Yes	The Legend of Zelda
Lloyd	Yes	Yes	Tales of Symphonia
Lucario	No	Yes	Pokémon
Luigi	Yes	Yes	Super Mario
Luffy	No	Yes	One Piece
Mario	Yes	Yes	Super Mario
Marth	No	Yes	Fire Emblem
Mega Man	No	Yes	Mega Man
Meta Knight	Yes	Yes	Kirby
Mewtwo	Yes	No	Pokémon
Mr. Game & Watch	Yes	Yes	Game & Watch
Mr. Incredible	Yes	No	The Incredibles
Naruto	Yes	Yes	Naruto
Ness	No	Yes	EarthBound
Pac-Man	No	Yes	Pac-Man
Peach	No	Yes	Super Mario
Pichu	No	Yes	Pokémon
Pikachu	Yes	Yes	Pokémon
Pit	No	Yes	Kid Icarus
Rayman	No	Yes	Rayman
Ryu	No	Yes	Street Fighter
Samus	Yes	Yes	Metroid
Sandbag	No	Yes	Super Smash Bros.
Shadow	Yes	No	Sonic the Hedgehog
Sheik	Yes	Yes	The Legend of Zelda
Simon	No	Yes	Castlevania
Sonic	Yes	Yes	Sonic the Hedgehog
Sora	No	Yes	Kingdom Hearts
Super Sonic	Yes	(Note: Appears only as Sonic's Final Smash attack)	Sonic the Hedgehog
Tails	Yes	Yes	Sonic the Hedgehog
Waluigi	No	Yes	Super Mario
Wario	No	Yes	WarioWare
Yoshi	No	Yes	Yoshi
X	Yes	No	Mega Man
Young Link	Yes	No	The Legend of Zelda
Zelda	Yes	Yes	The Legend of Zelda
Zero	Yes	No	Mega Man
Zero Suit Samus	No	Yes	Metroid

== Development ==
Development of the original Super Smash Flash began around mid-2006, as Cleod9's first Flash game project on his then TI-89-centric website, McLeodGaming, after understanding Flash coding well enough to make a full-fledged game. Although known for being a difficult game, its gameplay was hardly like that of the original Super Smash Bros. games. The game was originally a combat-oriented platformer starring Sonic the Hedgehog fan-characters called "Blade" and "Blue" (who would remain playable characters even in the final product), and the goal was to get through a large level with suspended platforms destroying flying robotic bees known as Buzzers (enemies from the Sega Genesis game, Sonic the Hedgehog 2). The game was eventually reworked into a Super Smash Bros. fan game—then called a "flash Smash engine" by Cleod9—where updates started incorporating new content, more characters, stages and items. It was based on Super Smash Bros. Melee as that was the current title in the official series at the time. As Cleod9's first big flash project, the game was considered "a great success for its time". The game was completed within roughly six months without any outside coding assistance, and was released August 21, 2006 on Newgrounds, a website known for its user-made Flash content. In this game, Kira Buckland, who just started a voice acting career, was the announcer and voiced Naruto. It is currently the 15th most played game ever on Newgrounds. Following the discontinuation of Adobe Flash Player in 2020, the game's accessibility on standard web browsers was compromised.

=== Super Smash Flash 2 ===
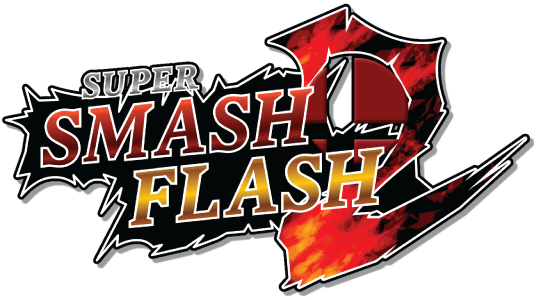
Logo for Super Smash Flash 2

The success of Super Smash Flash soon led to high demand for a sequel. When McLeodGaming first started development on Super Smash Flash 2 in 2007, the game was planned to be a sequel to the original Super Smash Flash, with the incremental aesthetic and gameplay improvements. This plan was ultimately discarded in favor of making a fresh, new start to reboot the series. Despite the title, Super Smash Flash 2 is not actually a sequel. It is an entirely new game, and only retains the original name of the project because of how widely known the title has become throughout the fanbase. Although the game is not complete yet, pre-releases – also known as demos – have been posted to their website for users and fans to see how far in development the game is. Various attempts to post minor updates have also been posted to the "Smash Flash DOJO", one of several websites run by developers based on a similar Nintendo site for the Smash Bros. series, but each attempt has been abandoned. Updates are also occasionally posted on the team's Facebook and Twitter pages.

There were two major turning points in the game's development. The first was on January 1, 2009, upon the release of v0.4a. This was the point where the game started becoming more complex, leading to snags in development as the difficulty of adding new characters was stated by Cleod to have "increased exponentially". The second turning point came with the following release, v0.7, on January 1, 2011. Initially thought to merely be an update that added content, Black Mage was included as a hidden character after playing ten battles. This was a shock to the fanbase, as he was the first character to be introduced who was not in the originally planned character roster. Directly related to knowledge of his surprise inclusion spreading among the general fanbase, McLeodGaming soon made an announcement that the planned roster had undergone a complete overhaul.

The final demo, Super Smash Flash 2 Beta, was announced on January 25, 2015. It was notable for dropping both the version number and designating itself as a beta version rather than a demo. On May 29, 2017, Super Smash Flash 2 Beta was finally released after almost three years of development. It added various aspects to stand on its own as a game, both present in the official Super Smash Bros. titles, such as Classic Mode (primarily in the vein of Super Smash Bros., but with added elements), and original to the game, such as Arena Mode. Updates to this version are designated with a separate version number starting at 1.0, with the latest update being Beta 1.4.0.1, which was released on May 13, 2025.

== Reception ==
Super Smash Flash garnered a mixed critical reception. Though initially reviewed positively, later reviews such as one on FlashGN found the game to be "lacking control", and "simply a buggy and flawed attempt at recreating one of the best fighting games of all time." Despite some poor reviews, Super Smash Flash earned a Newgrounds daily feature award, over 11 million views, and a four star rating, and was later categorized as making "Flash Portal History" for 2006. The game has picked up several other minor awards.

Super Smash Flash 2, though currently "a work in progress", has gained much more traction than its predecessor. It was featured in GamesRadar's "10 fan games that shouldn't be ceased or desisted" as #5 while still in its infancy. Shortly before the release of version 0.9b, one writer for the video gaming website Polygon said "There's a low-fi pixel art aesthetic and a sense of freedom that makes Super Smash Flash 2 more appealing to me than the real thing." Super Smash Flash 2's demos maintain over 400,000 plays a day on McLeodGaming alone, and peaked at over 1 million daily plays on January 20, 2013. Notably, the game's work-in-progress v0.9a demo was featured as an indie game at the worldwide Super Smash Bros. tournament Apex 2013, and returned the following two years with subsequent updates.
