= Rivals of Aether =

2017 video game

- Logo
- Developers: Dan Fornace; Aether Studios
- Designer: Dan Fornace
- Programmers: Trevor Youngblood; Ampersandbear
- Artists: Ellian; Alex Mcdonald
- Composer: flashygoodness
- Engine: GameMaker
- Platforms: Windows; Xbox One; Nintendo Switch
- Release: Microsoft Windows: WW: March 28, 2017; Xbox One: WW: August 22, 2017; Nintendo Switch: WW: September 24, 2020
- Genre: Platform fighter
- Modes: Single-player, multiplayer

Rivals of Aether is a platform fighter game created by Dan Fornace, and released for Microsoft Windows in March 2017, for Xbox One in August 2017, and for Nintendo Switch in September 2020. It received positive reception from critics, who commended its deep gameplay.

Rivals of Aether received several spin-off video games, forming a series revolving around the shared Aether fantasy world. The first spin-off, Lovers of Aether, a dating sim set in a modern-day alternate universe, released for PC on April 1, 2019 and iOS on July 30, 2019; a deck-building game, Creatures of Aether, released for iOS and Android on September 28, 2020, and for PC on August 2, 2021; and the roguelike Dungeons of Aether, released for PC and Nintendo Switch in 2023. A spin-off comic series, Tales of Aether, was also released in 2021, detailing the backstory of the game. A sequel to the original game, Rivals of Aether II, was released on October 23, 2024, while an additional spin-off, Dreams of Aether, a minigame collection based on the series' characters and lore, was released for PC on April 1, 2025.

== Gameplay ==
Rivals of Aether is the spiritual sequel to Super Smash Land, a fan-made demake of Super Smash Bros., and therefore its gameplay mechanics are heavily based on the latter game. Each character must try to knock the others out of a two-dimensional arena. In addition to fighting game-style moves, characters can also use elemental-based attacks or passive abilities that also affect the stage. This creates a meta game of not only attacking other players but also affecting the arena itself. Gameplay in general favors offense more than defense compared to Smash Bros.; attacks can only be blocked by executing a timed "parry" rather than holding up a shield, and characters cannot safely grab edges when returning to the stage, to balance these limitations the player can dodge on the ground and more often in comparison to Super Smash Land.

=== Characters ===
Each character aligns with a classical element that is central to their play style. Zetterburn, Forsburn, Clairen and Mollo represent fire; Orcane, Etalus, Ranno and Hodan represent water; Wrastor, Absa, Elliana and Pomme represent air; and Kragg, Maypul, Sylvanos and Olympia represent earth. The game also contains the guest characters Ori and Sein from Ori and the Blind Forest, and the eponymous hero of the Shovel Knight series.

In Smash Bros., many characters possess only close-combat attacks, with most projectiles being very short-lived. By contrast, all Rivals characters have at least one move with a long-lasting effect on the stage itself, such as bubbles that trap enemies, ice that lets the user move quickly, or a water puddle that can either power up the user's attacks or act as a point for the user to teleport to. Some even create platforms that change the physical makeup of the stage. Cecilia D'Anastasio of Kotaku described Smash Bros. move sets as being more "reserved" compared to those of Rivals of Aether.

On January 17, 2018, Maypul and Ranno received crossover skins based on the characters Ragnir and Wu Shang from Brawlhalla. The Definitive Edition release includes additional skins that transform the fighters into different characters. The development team has also released two characters via the Steam Workshop: the panda Guadua, and the April Fool's Day joke character Sandbert.

On April 1, 2021, it was announced that four popular fan-made characters from the Steam Workshop would be officially added to the game in late 2021 via a free update: Mollo, Hodan, Pomme, and Olympia. The update containing the four characters was released on February 3, 2022.

== Story ==
The realm of Aether is inhabited by many races of anthropomorphic animals divided primarily between four warring civilisations, each of which holds power over a different element: fire, water, earth or air.

As the trade routes of the Water Trade Company are repeatedly attacked by the Air Armada, the Company strikes a deal with the noble thief Orcane to retrieve their stolen goods from the Armada in exchange for better living conditions for the people of Merchant Port. In the Fire Capital, the Emperor is found murdered and his son Forsburn is the primary suspect. Forsburn pleads with his brother Zetterburn, claiming he was framed by the Fire Council and new Emperor Loxodont, but Zetterburn refuses to believe him and attacks. Forsburn is forced to flee to the neighboring wastelands and is taken in by the Smoke Clan. At Loxodont's coronation, the ceremonial flame is stolen by a figure resembling Orcane, and he is pursued by Zetterburn, who attacks Merchant Port in a rage. He defeats Orcane, but it is revealed to only be a shadow in his image. Zetterburn begins tracking the shadow back to its place of origin, while the real Orcane, returning from his mission, decides to follow.

In the Aetherian Forest, guardian Maypul senses a strange sickness is causing the plant life to rot and leaves her sister Mayreed behind to search for its source. While searching, she discovers the Fire Guard attacking the Smoke Clan settlement. She encounters Forsburn and they attack one another, believing each other to be responsible. When Maypul accuses him, Forsburn reveals he had an encounter with a shadow resembling his brother, and speculates this to be the source of the sickness affecting the forest. The two decide to work together to locate the source of the shadows.

While on a scouting mission for the Air Armada, wingmen Wrastor and Bradshaw spot a giant breach in the Rock Wall surrounding the Aetherian Forest and descend to investigate. However, they are attacked by Kragg, one of the Wallbuilders tasked with maintaining the Rock Wall, who assumes they are there to exploit its weakness. Kragg manages to severely injure Bradshaw due to Wrastor's carelessness, forcing the two to retreat as Wrastor swears vengeance. Kragg is then attacked by a figure resembling Maypul. Kragg initially believes the Wallbuilders have been betrayed by the forest-dwellers, but Mayreed arrives to confirm this Maypul is an imposter. She sends Kragg to track down the real Maypul, unaware that he is being followed by Wrastor.

The six eventually converge at a crater in the center of Aether. Before they can attack one another, a stone structure emerges from the crater, leading to an abyss below the ground from which more shadows emerge. Realizing this to be the source of the imposters and the forest's sickness, the warriors put their rivalries aside and battle together to vanquish the shadow creatures. Emerging victorious, the six make amends with one another and agree to prepare themselves should the shadow creatures ever return.

== Development ==
A focus in the development of the game was making it faster and more combo-oriented than Super Smash Bros. On August 22, 2017, Ori and Sein from Ori and the Blind Forest were released as downloadable content (DLC). On October 17, 2017, Fornace released two more DLC characters, Ranno and Clairen. Likewise, on April 2, 2018, Fornace released another two DLC characters, Sylvanos and Elliana. On September 14, 2018, Shovel Knight from the video game of the same name was released as the second guest character and final playable character. In 2019, the official Rivals of Aether Twitter account confirmed that the Steam workshop would be available for players to create their own characters and stages. In January 2020, Rivals of Aether: Definitive Edition was reconfirmed as a complete version of the game containing all the DLC characters. Later that year, on April 1, the full features of Definitive Edition were announced through an online presentation, confirming features like new unlockables and a new mode based around tetherball. Definitive Edition was ultimately released on September 24, 2020. On April 1, 2021, it was revealed that four of the original characters released via the Steam Workshop would be officially added in a forthcoming free update. These characters, along with an update that implemented rollback netcode, were released on February 3, 2022.

== Reception ==
Rivals of Aether was positively received by critics. Nick Valdez of Destructoid found it to be a fully fleshed out fighter that adds additional depth to the Super Smash Bros. formula. Di Stefano Castelli of IGN Italia said that it lacks originality, but is a technically proficient remake appealing to hardcore players.

Rock, Paper, Shotgun said that she enjoyed the game's character design, and that it was reminiscent of Pokémon. Polygon called the game "beautiful" and "the indie answer to Super Smash Bros".

== Legacy ==
The game received multiple spin-offs, with the first being Lovers of Aether, a free promotional dating sim released on April Fools' Day 2019. Lovers takes place in a parallel universe in which the game's anthropomorphic characters are all high school students in the same school, and the player is attempting to find a date for the school dance. Depending on their choices, the player can either be accepted or rejected by their chosen character. Sin Vega of Rock, Paper, Shotgun praised the game for making all the characters romanceable rather than limiting it to women, as in a bishōjo game, and giving them "more personality and charm" than a typical dating sim.

Another spin-off, the deck-building game Creatures of Aether, was originally released on September 28, 2020, and later received a PC version on August 2, 2021. It was also positively received, with Harry Slater of Gamezebo called it surprisingly deep.

Tales of Aether, a four-issue comic series detailing the backstory of Clairen, one of the game's characters, was released throughout 2021. A third spin-off game, Dungeons of Aether, was released on February 28, 2023, and is a turn-based roguelike. A 3D fighting game sequel to Rivals of Aether was teased on April 1, 2021, and was titled Rivals 2 one year later complete with a 2024 release, as well as the formation of Aether Studios to oversee the series in the future. It was later retitled Rivals of Aether II and was released on Steam in October 23.

On April Fools' Day 2025, the WarioWare-style microgame collection spin-off Dreams of Aether was released for PC. It takes place in the Spirit World, a dream world, where Absa finds herself trapped while asleep after her mind palace is filled with random dreams. A mysterious piñata-like creature starts linking her mind with other sleeping Aether universe characters, and she must also fight through their dreams to escape. It was positively reviewed by Jeremy Peeples of Hardcore Gamer, who called it "top-shelf" and "one of the best" shadow drops he had seen on PC.
