= Platform fighter =

Video game genre

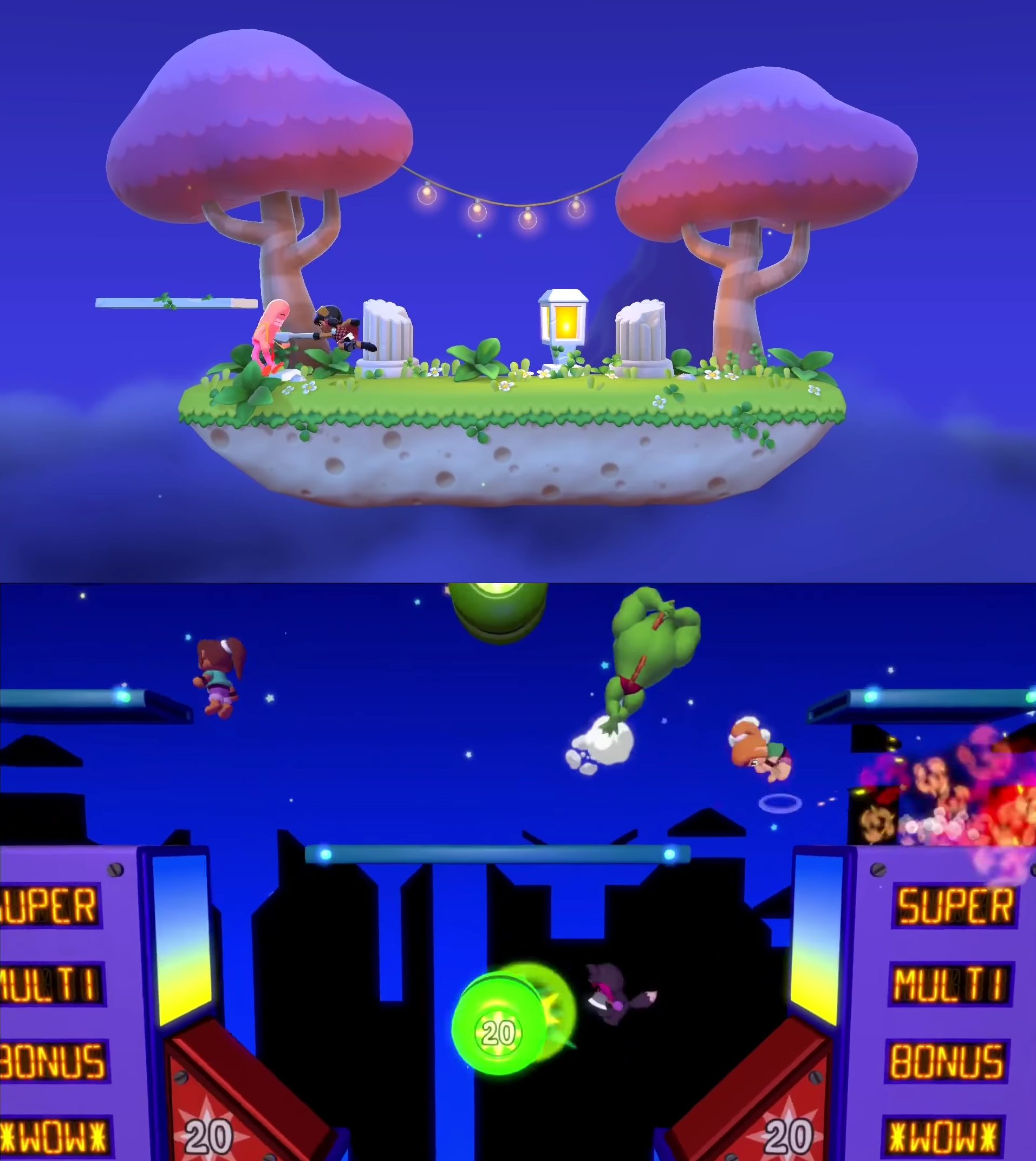
Various characters battling on platforms in the video game Slap City. Top: a typical competitive battle, occurring between two combatants on a flat stage with no hazards Bottom: a typical casual battle, occurring between 4 combatants on an unusually shaped stage with hazardous objects

Button inputs to use moves in platform fighters typically consist of three streamlined variables: the button pressed, what direction the joystick is in, and whether the player is on ground or air.

A platform fighter is a sub-genre of fighting games that emphasizes free 2D movement, often with floating platforms that can be traversed on, similar to a platform game. The central gameplay involves combat between two or more player-controlled characters, with the goal of attacking an opponent's character until they are defeated. Platform fighters are sometimes colloquially referred to as "Smash clones", in reference to the most popular platform fighter series, Super Smash Bros.

Unlike other fighting games, platform fighters typically do not have a health bar; instead, the damage that a player's character has taken increases the distance they are launched when hit by an attack. Opponents are defeated when they leave the boundaries of the arena.

== History ==
While there have been some 2D fighting games that have used mechanics like platforms in stages like in Savage Reign, these games are not considered platform fighters, as they play like traditional 2D fighting games with an added gimmick. Though The Outfoxies was an early example of many of the mechanics featured in most platform fighters, the subgenre would be most defined by the release of Super Smash Bros. in 1999, which was the first game in the subgenre to achieve wide success and defined the mechanics for most games that followed. After the release of the original Super Smash Bros., many companies would release their own games similar in style with some being crossover games like DreamMix TV World Fighters or games with licensed characters like Digimon Rumble Arena and Battle Stadium D.O.N. Teenage Mutant Ninja Turtles: Smash-Up was notably developed by a studio that contributed to Super Smash Bros. Brawl.

In the mid-2010s, indie developers began developing fighting games that imitated the mechanics of Super Smash Bros., including Rivals of Aether, Brawlout, and Brawlhalla. It was around this time that the term "platform fighter" began to be used more frequently to refer to games similar to Super Smash Bros. Following the success of Super Smash Bros. Ultimate in 2018, new platform fighters have emerged based on various licensed properties, such as Nickelodeon All-Star Brawl and its sequel, Fraymakers, and MultiVersus.
