= 1994 in video games =

1994 saw many sequels and prequels in video games, such as Super Metroid, Donkey Kong Country, Final Fantasy VI, Sonic 3 & Knuckles, Super Street Fighter II Turbo and Virtua Fighter 2 and Doom II, along with new titles such as Daytona USA, Ace Driver, Alpine Racer, The King of Fighters '94 and Tekken.

The year's best-selling video game console was the Game Boy, while the Sega Mega Drive/Genesis remained the best-selling home console. The year's highest-grossing arcade video games were Super Street Fighter II X (Super Street Fighter II Turbo) and Virtua Fighter in Japan, and Daytona USA and Mortal Kombat II in the United States, while the year's best-selling home video game worldwide was Donkey Kong Country.

== Legend ==
Video game platforms
3DO	3DO	Arcade	Arcade video game	DOS	PC DOS / MS-DOS, Windows 3.X
GB	Game Boy	GEN	Genesis / Mega Drive	GG	Game Gear
LIN	Linux, SteamOS	MAC	Classic Mac OS, 2001 and before	NEO	Neo Geo AES
NES	Nintendo Entertainment System / Famicom	PS1	PlayStation 1	S32X	32X
SAT	Sega Saturn	SCD	Sega CD / Mega-CD	SMS	Master System
SNES	Super NES / Super Famicom / Super Comboy				

Video game genres
Action	Action game	Action RPG	Action role-playing game	City builder	City-building game
Fighting	Fighting game	FPS	First-person shooter	Metroidvania	Metroidvania
Platformer	Platformer	Racing	Racing video game	RPG	Role-playing video game
Sandbox	Sandbox game	Simulation	Simulation video game	Sports	Sports video game
Tactical RPG	Tactical role-playing game				

== Hardware releases ==
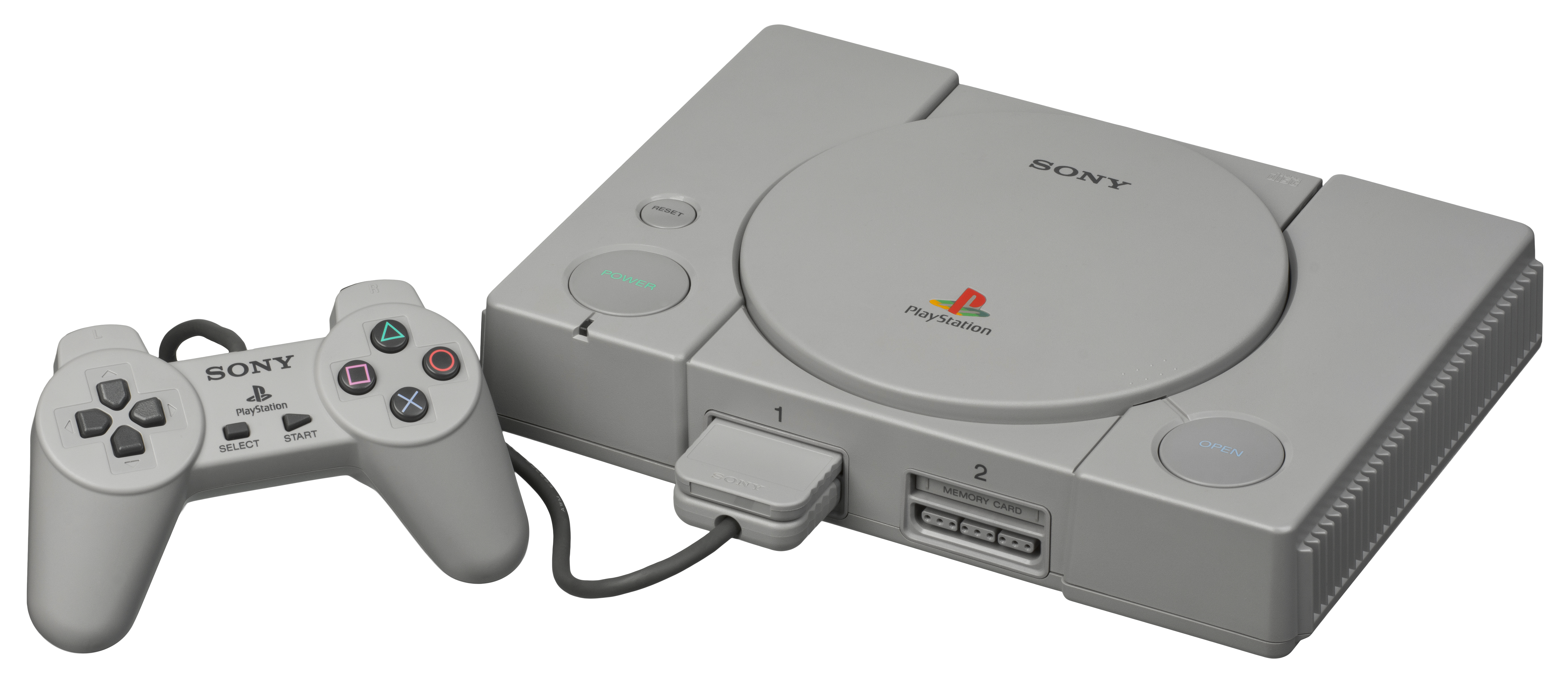
PlayStation video game console, first released in Japan

- Aiwa releases the Aiwa Mega-CD multimedia home console in Japan only.
- Bandai releases the Playdia multimedia home console.
- NEC releases the PC-FX multimedia home console.
- Sega:
  - introduces the North American cable TV Sega Channel in cooperation with Time Warner (AOL Time Warner); the subscription service provides Sega Genesis games via cable box to customers
  - releases the Sega 32X add-on for the Sega Mega Drive/Genesis in Europe (November 14), North America (November 21) and Japan (December 3)
  - releases the Sega Nomad handheld console in North America, a portable Sega Genesis.
  - releases the Sega Saturn home console in Japan on November 22
- SNK releases the Neo Geo CD home console.
- Sony releases the PlayStation home console in Japan on December 3.
- Nintendo releases the Super Game Boy adapter for the Super Nintendo home console.
- Atari Corporation discontinues the Lynx handheld system.

== Top-rated games ==
=== Game of the Year awards ===
The following titles won Game of the Year awards for 1994.

Awards	Game of the Year	Platform	Publisher	Genre	Ref
Electronic Gaming Monthly (EGM)	Donkey Kong Country	SNES	Nintendo	Platformer	
Game Informer	Donkey Kong Country	SNES	Nintendo	Platformer	
Video Games & Computer Magazine	Donkey Kong Country	SNES	Nintendo	Platformer	
Time	Donkey Kong Country	SNES	Nintendo	Platformer	
Nintendo Power	Donkey Kong Country	SNES	Nintendo	Platformer	
Kid's Choice Awards	Donkey Kong Country	SNES	Nintendo	Platformer	
Computer Gaming World Premier Awards	X-COM: UFO Defense	DOS	MicroProse	Strategy	
GameFan Megawards	Earthworm Jim	GEN	Playmates Interactive	Platformer	
GameFan Megawards	Clockwork Knight	SAT	Sega	Platformer	
Gamest Awards	The King of Fighters '94	Arcade	SNK	Fighting	
IAAPA Exhibit Awards	Ace Driver	Arcade	Namco	Racing	
Video Software Dealers Association (VSDA)	NBA Jam		Acclaim	Sports (basketball)	

=== Famitsu Platinum Hall of Fame ===
The following video game releases in 1994 entered Famitsu magazine's "Platinum Hall of Fame" for receiving Famitsu scores of at least 35 out of 40.

Title	Platform	Developer	Publisher	Genre	Score (out of 40)
Final Fantasy VI	SNES	Squaresoft	Squaresoft	RPG	37
Ridge Racer	PS1	Namco	Namco	Racing	37
Fire Emblem: Monshō no Nazo (Mystery of the Emblem)	SNES	Intelligent Systems	Nintendo	Tactical RPG	36
Virtua Fighter	SAT	Sega AM2	Sega	Fighting	36

== Financial performance ==
=== Highest-grossing arcade games ===
The best-selling arcade printed circuit board (PCB) worldwide in 1994 was SNK's Neo Geo MVS system.

==== Japan ====
The following titles were the top ten highest-grossing arcade games of 1994 in Japan.

Rank	Gamest		Game Machine		
Rank	Title	Manufacturer	Title	Type	Points
1	Super Street Fighter II X: Grand Master Challenge	Capcom	Virtua Fighter	PCB / Deluxe	5857
2	Virtua Fighter	Sega	Super Street Fighter II / X	PCB	5003
3	Garō Densetsu Special (Fatal Fury Special)	SNK	Puyo Puyo	PCB	3466
4	Vampire: The Night Warriors (Darkstalkers)	Capcom	Ridge Racer	Deluxe	3265
5	The King of Fighters '94	SNK	Super Real Mahjong PIV	PCB	2909
6	Super Street Fighter II	Capcom	Shanghai III	PCB	2794
7	Gokujo Parodius	Konami	Raiden II	PCB	2718
8	Ridge Racer	Namco	Lethal Enforcers	Dedicated	2713
9	Daytona USA	Sega	Tetris (Sega)	PCB	2686
10	Puyo Puyo	Compile	OutRunners	2P cabinet	2676

==== United Kingdom ====
In the United Kingdom, the following titles were the highest-grossing games of each month in 1994.

Month	Dedicated arcade cabinet	Printed circuit board (PCB)	Ref
February	Ridge Racer		
March	Ridge Racer	Super Street Fighter II Turbo	
April	Ridge Racer	Super Street Fighter II Turbo	
May	Daytona USA	Super Street Fighter II Turbo	
June	Daytona USA	Super Street Fighter II Turbo	
July	Daytona USA		
August	Daytona USA		
September	Daytona USA		
October	Daytona USA	Gunbird	

Virtua Fighter by Sega AM2 was also one of the UK's most popular coin-ops of the year.

==== United States ====
In the United States, the following titles were the highest-grossing arcade video games of 1994.

Rank	Play Meter	AAMA		AMOA	
Rank	Play Meter	Title	Award	Dedicated arcade cabinet	Arcade conversion kit
1	Daytona USA, Mortal Kombat II	Daytona USA (Twin); Cruis'n USA, Killer Instinct, Mortal Kombat II, Neo Geo MVS	Diamond	Mortal Kombat II	
2	Daytona USA, Mortal Kombat II	Daytona USA (Twin); Cruis'n USA, Killer Instinct, Mortal Kombat II, Neo Geo MVS	Diamond	Lethal Enforcers, Mortal Kombat, NBA Jam, NBA Jam: Tournament Edition, Virtua Fighter	NBA Jam: Tournament Edition, Raiden II, Super Street Fighter II, Samurai Shodown
3	Unknown	Daytona USA (Twin); Cruis'n USA, Killer Instinct, Mortal Kombat II, Neo Geo MVS	Diamond	Lethal Enforcers, Mortal Kombat, NBA Jam, NBA Jam: Tournament Edition, Virtua Fighter	NBA Jam: Tournament Edition, Raiden II, Super Street Fighter II, Samurai Shodown
4	Unknown	Daytona USA (Twin); Cruis'n USA, Killer Instinct, Mortal Kombat II, Neo Geo MVS	Diamond	Lethal Enforcers, Mortal Kombat, NBA Jam, NBA Jam: Tournament Edition, Virtua Fighter	NBA Jam: Tournament Edition, Raiden II, Super Street Fighter II, Samurai Shodown
5	Unknown	Daytona USA (Twin); Cruis'n USA, Killer Instinct, Mortal Kombat II, Neo Geo MVS	Diamond	Lethal Enforcers, Mortal Kombat, NBA Jam, NBA Jam: Tournament Edition, Virtua Fighter	NBA Jam: Tournament Edition, Raiden II, Super Street Fighter II, Samurai Shodown
6	Unknown	NBA Jam: Tournament Edition	Platinum	Lethal Enforcers, Mortal Kombat, NBA Jam, NBA Jam: Tournament Edition, Virtua Fighter	—N/a
7	Unknown	Darkstalkers: The Night Warriors, Raiden II, Revolution X	Gold	—N/a	
8	Unknown	Darkstalkers: The Night Warriors, Raiden II, Revolution X	Gold	—N/a	
9	Unknown	Darkstalkers: The Night Warriors, Raiden II, Revolution X	Gold	—N/a	
10	Unknown	Alien vs. Predator, Dungeons & Dragons: Tower of Doom, Super Street Fighter II Turbo	Silver	—N/a	
11	Unknown	Alien vs. Predator, Dungeons & Dragons: Tower of Doom, Super Street Fighter II Turbo	Silver	—N/a	
12	Unknown	Alien vs. Predator, Dungeons & Dragons: Tower of Doom, Super Street Fighter II Turbo	Silver	—N/a	

=== Best-selling video game consoles ===
Rank	Manufacturer	Platform	Type	Sales				
Rank	Manufacturer	Platform	Type	Japan	USA	Europe	Elsewhere	Worldwide
1	Nintendo	GB	Handheld	1,140,000	Unknown	Unknown	Unknown	7,500,000+
2	Sega	GEN	Home	500,000	4,000,000+	1,540,000	1,000,000	7,040,000+
3	Nintendo	SNES	Home	2,200,000	2,058,000	1,060,000	900,000	6,218,000
4	Sega	SCD	Home	150,000	550,000	205,000	—N/a	905,000
5	Sega	GG	Handheld	350,000	500,000+	Unknown	Unknown	850,000+
6	Sega	SAT	Home	840,000	—N/a	—N/a	—N/a	840,000
7	Sega	S32X	Home	270,000	500,000	65,000	—N/a	835,000
8	Goldstar, Panasonic, Sanyo	3DO	Home	450,000	160,000	15,000	5,000+	630,000+
9	Sony	PS1	Home	600,000	—N/a	—N/a	—N/a	600,000
10	Nintendo	NES	Home	280,000	268,000	Unknown	Unknown	548,000+

=== Best-selling home video games ===
The following titles were the top ten best-selling home video games (console games or computer games) worldwide in 1994.

Rank	Title	Platform	Sales		
Rank	Title	Platform	Japan	USA	Worldwide
1	Donkey Kong Country (Super Donkey Kong)	SNES	956,000	2,057,006	6,000,000
2	Street Fighter II		941,000+	989,178+ (Note: 222,224+ Street Fighter II Turbo and Special Champion Edition sales up until August. 341,728 Super Street Fighter II sales up until September. 448,452 Street Fighter II, Turbo and Special Champion Edition sales in December.)	3,709,090+ (Note: 1.9 million worldwide sales during January–March 1994. 77,910+ Street Fighter II Turbo and Special Champion Edition sales in the US during April–August. 941,000 Super Street Fighter II sales in Japan during June–December. 341,728 Super Street Fighter II sales in the US during July–September. 448,452 Street Fighter II, Turbo and Special Champion Edition sales in the US during December.)
3	Final Fantasy VI (Final Fantasy III)	SNES	2,550,000+	275,952	2,825,952+
4	Mortal Kombat II		Unknown	1,929,494+	2,500,000+
5	NBA Jam	GEN, SNES	Unknown	2,313,526	2,313,526+
6	Sonic 3 & Knuckles	GEN	Unknown	1,473,730	1,473,730+
7	Madden NFL 95	GEN, SNES	—N/a	811,568	811,568+
8	Super Metroid	SNES	531,000	256,262+	787,262+
9	Mighty Morphin Power Rangers	GEN, SNES	—N/a	731,910	731,910+
10	J.League Excite Stage '94 (Capcom's Soccer Shootout)	SNES	714,000	Unknown	714,000+

==== Japan ====
In Japan, the following titles were the top ten best-selling home video games of 1994.

Rank	Title	Platform	Publisher	Genre	Sales	Ref
1	Final Fantasy VI	SNES	Squaresoft	RPG	2,550,000+	
2	Super Donkey Kong (Donkey Kong Country)	SNES	Nintendo	Platformer	956,000	
3	Super Street Fighter II	SNES	Capcom	Fighting	941,000	
4	J.League Excite Stage '94 (Capcom's Soccer Shootout)	SNES	Epoch Co.	Sports (soccer)	714,000	
5	Super Bomberman 2	SNES	Hudson Soft	Maze	713,000	
6	Super Momotarō Dentetsu III	SNES	Hudson Soft	Simulation	610,000	
7	Dragon Ball Z: Super Butōden 3	SNES	Bandai	Fighting	595,000	
8	Fire Emblem: Monshō no Nazo (Mystery of the Emblem)	SNES	Nintendo	Tactical RPG	563,000	
9	Super Metroid	SNES	Nintendo	Metroidvania	531,000	
10	Mother 2: Gīgu no Gyakushū (EarthBound)	SNES	Nintendo	RPG	518,000	

==== United States ====
In the United States, the following titles were the top ten best-selling home video games of 1994.

Rank	Title	Platform	Publisher	Genre	Sales	Ref
1	NBA Jam	GEN, SNES	Acclaim Entertainment	Sports (basketball)	2,313,526	
2	Donkey Kong Country	SNES	Nintendo	Platformer	2,057,006	
3	Mortal Kombat II	GEN, SNES	Acclaim Entertainment	Fighting	1,929,494	
4	Sonic 3 & Knuckles	GEN	Sega	Platformer	1,473,730	
5	Street Fighter II	GEN, SNES	Capcom	Fighting	989,178+	
6	Madden NFL 95	GEN, SNES	EA Sports	Sports (football)	811,568	
7	Mighty Morphin Power Rangers	GEN, SNES	Sega, Bandai	Action	731,910	
8	The Lion King	GEN, SNES	Virgin Interactive	Platformer	619,399	
9	NBA Live 95	GEN, SNES	EA Sports	Sports (basketball)	542,758	
10	Disney's Aladdin	SNES	Capcom	Platformer	421,996+	

==== United Kingdom ====
HMV, a British entertainment retailer, released a monthly list of the chain's highest-selling home video game titles. The following titles topped the monthly all-formats charts, as reported by Computer and Video Games.

Month	Title	Platform	Publisher	Genre	Ref
January	Sensible Soccer	GEN	Sony	Sports (soccer)	
February	SimCity 2000	DOS, MAC	Mindscape	City builder	
March	NBA Jam	GEN, SNES, GG	Acclaim	Sports (basketball)	
April	Doom		Id Software	FPS	
May	World Cup Striker	SNES	U.S. Gold	Sports (soccer)	
June	World Cup USA '94	GEN, SNES, GG	U.S. Gold	Sports (soccer)	
July	Star Wars: TIE Fighter		Virgin Interactive	Space combat	
August	Super Street Fighter II	GEN	Sega	Fighting	
September	Mortal Kombat II	SNES, GEN, SMS, GG, GB	Acclaim	Fighting	
October	Doom II		Virgin Interactive	FPS	
November	FIFA Soccer 95	GEN	EA Sports	Sports (soccer)	
December	FIFA Soccer 95	GEN	EA Sports	Sports (soccer)	

== Events ==
- Nintendo proclaims "1994: The Year of the Cartridge".
- Nintendo Australia Pty. Ltd, the Australian subsidiary of Nintendo Co., Ltd is established and opened by Hiroshi Yamauchi and effectively ends Mattel Australia's distribution of Nintendo's products throughout Australia.
- "Project Reality" is renamed the Nintendo Ultra 64. The console's design is revealed to the public for the first time in spring 1994.
- The second of two congressional hearings on video games takes place on March 5. Topics for discussion include the depiction of violence and sexual content in video games, their influence on children, and the prospect of governmental regulation of video game content.
- April – The Interactive Digital Software Association (IDSA) is founded in response to the hearings (name changed to the Entertainment Software Association in 2003); the IDSA founds the Entertainment Software Rating Board (ESRB) in order to self-regulate content in video games in the mold of the Motion Picture Association of America film rating system.
- April 28 – Sega and MGM make a venture to create video games, movies, and television programs.
- June 24 – The Computer Game Developers Association is formed by Ernest W. Adams.
- November – Game Zero magazine drops their print format and becomes the first video game news magazine on the web.
- November 10 – William Higinbotham, creator of Tennis for Two (1958), dies at 84.

=== Business ===
- New companies: Neversoft
- Defunct: Commodore, Tradewest
- September 14 – Video gaming magazine Nintendomagasinet is cancelled after four years. Number 9 of 1994 would have been released on this day, but instead the magazine joins Super Power.
- Apogee establishes the 3D Realms Entertainment division.
- Blizzard Entertainment is renamed from Silicon & Synapse.
- SSI sold to Mindscape
- Alpex Computer Corp. v. Nintendo lawsuit: Alpex sues Nintendo over patent infringements related to the NES. Nintendo loses the case. (In 1996 this ruling was reversed by an appeals court, which determined that no patents had been infringed upon.)
  - Nintendo of America, Inc. v. Dragon Pacific Intern

== Notable releases in 1994 ==
Release Date	Title	Platform	Developer/Publisher	Genre	Ref
February 2	Sonic the Hedgehog 3	GEN	Sega	Platformer	
March	X-COM: UFO Defense	DOS	Mythos Games/MicroProse	Turn-based Strategy	
March 19	Super Metroid	SNES	Nintendo	Metroidvania	
March 25	The Elder Scrolls: Arena	DOS	Bethesda	Action RPG, Sandbox	
April 2	Final Fantasy VI	SNES	Square Co.	RPG	
June 14	Donkey Kong	GB	Nintendo	Puzzle-platformer	
July	TIE Fighter	DOS	LucasArts	Space flight simulation	
August 2	Earthworm Jim	SNES, GEN	Shiny Entertainment	Platformer	
August 25	The King of Fighters '94	NEO	SNK	Fighting	
August 27	EarthBound	SNES	Nintendo	RPG	
September	Master of Magic	DOS	MicroProse	4X, Turn-based Strategy	
September 9	Mortal Kombat II	SNES	Sculptured Software/Acclaim Entertainment	Fighting	
September 22	System Shock	DOS	Looking Glass Studios/Origin Systems	Action-adventure	
October 10	Doom	LIN	Dave D. Taylor/id Software	FPS	
October 10	Doom II	DOS	id Software	FPS	
October 17	Sonic & Knuckles	GEN	Sega	Platformer	
October 28	Killer Instinct	Arcade	Rare	Fighting	
November 15	Warcraft: Orcs & Humans	DOS	Blizzard Entertainment	Real-time Strategy	
November 15	NFL '95	GEN, GG	Double Diamond Software (GEN); Blue Sky Software (GG)	Sports (football)	
November 21	Donkey Kong Country	SNES	Rare/Nintendo	Platformer	
November 23	King's Quest VII: The Princeless Bride	DOS	Sierra On-Line	Adventure	
November 25	Banshee's Last Cry	SNES	Chunsoft	Visual novel	
December	The Need for Speed	3DO	Electronic Arts	Racing	
December	Magic Carpet	DOS, PS1, SAT	Bullfrog Productions	Action	
December	Wing Commander III: Heart of the Tiger	DOS	Origin	Space combat simulator	
December 9	Tekken	Arcade	Namco	Fighting	
December 10	Wario's Woods	NES	Nintendo	Puzzle	
December 16	King's Field	PS1	FromSoftware	Action RPG	
December 21	Marathon	MAC	Bungie	FPS	
December 27	Heretic	DOS, MAC	Raven Software/id Software	FPS	

== See also ==
- 1994 in games
