= PxTone =

Freeware music editing program

PxTone Collage
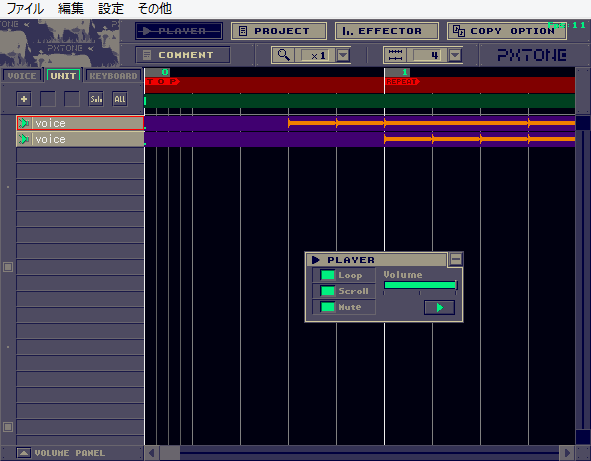
- PxTone Collage - Unit View
- Developer: Daisuke Amaya
- Stable release: v0.9.4.56 / April 2, 2022; 3 years ago
- Operating system: Microsoft Windows
- Type: Digital music workstation
- License: Freeware
- Website: studiopixel.sakura.ne.jp/pxtone/, pxtone.org

PxTone Collage (Japanese: ピストンコラージュ, Hepburn: Pisutonkorāju) is a freeware music editing program. The program is developed by Daisuke "Pixel" Amaya. It is currently in the beta stage of development, and has been since 2006.

The program also is capable of opening other sample formats developed by Pixel (.ptnoise and .ptvoice) in addition to some more popular audio formats, such as .wav and .ogg. The primary interface of the program is a piano roll display. It is used to place notes and specify duration, volume, panning, and pitch, among other things. The tempo of a song can be set once, but it cannot be changed during playback (or at any point in the song other than the beginning). The .ptcop and .pttune formats also allow the storage of some additional information, such as song comments and song name.

Along with PxTone Collage are included several programs for creating instrument samples (.ptnoise and .ptvoice format) and a small player application. Included with these programs is the PxTone engine library. The source code for said audio processing engine can be downloaded separately.

== History ==
In 1998, Pixel released a small music-writing and playback application known as PiyoPiyo. This format features three melody tracks with customizable wave samples, and a fourth track dedicated solely to drum samples. The editor interface uses a piano roll, a similarity shared by all of Pixel's future music editors. A considerable flaw with the PiyoPiyo design is that its playback is linked to CPU usage, in that a heavily taxed CPU will cause playback to slow down.

Some time later, Pixel developed the Organya (OrgMaker) format for use in the indie game Cave Story. This format is very similar to PiyoPiyo, with the major difference being support for up to 8 melody tracks and 8 drum tracks for 16 simultaneous sounds. Rather than having the specifications of the waveform editable, Organya uses a built-in library of 100 wave "instruments" to choose from. PxTone began development in 2006 for use in a number of future games, such as Kero Blaster (and other games using its engine like Pink Hour), Guxt, Shine-Shine Galaxy, and Soaprun.

== Features ==
- Up to 100 voice samples, 50 instrument units, and 500,000 events per file
- Sampling of .wav, .ogg, .pcm, .ptvoice, and .ptnoise
- Effect groups for echo and overdrive
- Comment metadata
- Velocity, Pan, Volume, Key Portamento and Key Correct adjustment
- Exports to .wav and .pttune

== Limitations ==
- Does not support VSTs
- Does not support 32-bit output sampling
- Does not support MIDI import or export

== See also ==
- List of music software
