= Ikachan =

1999 video game

- Developer: Pixel
- Publishers: JP: Pixel; NA: Nicalis (3DS); JP: Pikii (3DS)
- Designer: Daisuke Amaya
- Platforms: Microsoft Windows, Nintendo 3DS
- Release: Windows: JP: April 18, 1999; Nintendo 3DS: NA: January 31, 2013; JP: November 30, 2016
- Genres: Platform, Metroidvania
- Mode: Single-player

Ikachan (いかちゃん) is a freeware video game created by Japanese developer Daisuke Amaya, under the art name Pixel. In the game, the player plays a squid named Ikachan, who swims through a cave, meeting and helping other creatures. The game was later released by Nicalis for the Nintendo 3DS eShop on January 31, 2013. On November 30, 2016, Japanese publisher Pikii released the game on the Japanese eShop.

== Plot ==
Ikachan takes place in Ironhead's realm, an underwater cave system. A series of earthquakes had recently caused cave-ins that cut off Ironhead's realm from the open sea. As such, the inhabitants of the cave ran out of food and were required to carry pearls marking their allegiance to Ironhead. Ironhead himself remains stuck in a private cave, spreading paranoia and encouraging violence against non-citizens to keep the population of the cave from overthrowing him as their leader. Ikachan wakes up inside the cave and swims around, searching for a way to escape.

=== Characters ===
- Ikachan is a squid-like creature who awakens inside Ironhead's realm. He is the main protagonist and playable character.
- Pinky is a young sea creature who helps Ikachan in his escape.
- Ironhead is a large fish with an iron helmet and the self-appointed leader of the caves.
- Storehouse watchman is the father of Pinky and guard of the remaining food supply.
- Carry is a large fish who guards Ironhead's cave.

== Gameplay ==
Ironhead and Ikachan, as seen in Cave Story

Ikachan features unique gameplay; as opposed to using the arrow keys to move, the player uses the left and right arrow keys to tilt Ikachan in the respective direction. The player must then use the 'z' key to swim in the direction Ikachan is pointing. Thus, Ikachan cannot swim directly to the left or right at first, but he later acquires an item that allows him to charge horizontally. Also, while being unable to hurt enemies from the start, once Ikachan receives an item called the Pointy Hat, he can attack enemies by ramming them with the point of the hat.

The game contains role-playing game-aspects, as Ikachan can level up after attacking enough enemies or eating fish.

== Promotion ==
To help promote the game and the WiiWare release of Cave Story, Pixel made a mini game based on Ikachan for the Nintendo DS game, WarioWare D.I.Y. The game is available for download as a Big Name Game in North America since April 5, 2010.

After Cave Story's success on WiiWare, Nicalis hinted at ports of Ikachan and Guxt, other freeware games by Pixel, for DSiWare. Nicalis announced a Nintendo 3DS version in October 2012, with plans for a DSi release, which was discarded. On January 31, 2013, despite the previous announcement only the Nintendo 3DS version released on the Nintendo eShop for $4.99. On November 30, 2016, Japanese publisher Pikii released the game on the Japanese eShop for 300 yen.

== Reception ==
Reception

Aggregate score
Aggregator	Score
Metacritic	71/100

Review scores
Publication	Score
Destructoid	6.5/10
GameRevolution	4.5/5
IGN	7.3/10
Nintendo Life	6/10
Nintendo World Report	7.5/10

The 3DS version received "mixed or average" reviews according to the review aggregation website Metacritic. MTV's Jason Cirpriano stated that the game would appeal to fans of Cave Story, but also noted that it could be completed in about an hour.
