= Daisuke Amaya =

Japanese indie game developer (born 1977)

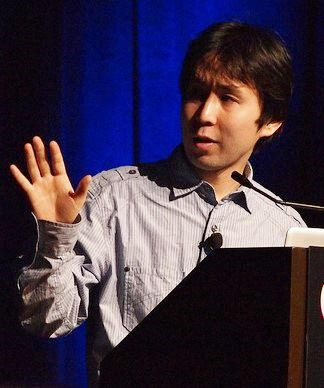
- Amaya speaking at the 2011 Game Developers Conference.
- Born: April 29, 1977 (age 49); Ono, Fukui, Japan
- Other names: Pixel, Pi, Pix
- Occupation: Video game developer
- Notable work: Cave Story

Daisuke Amaya (天谷 大輔, Amaya Daisuke; born April 29, 1977), also known by his pseudonym Pixel, is a Japanese indie game developer. He is best known for developing Cave Story (洞窟物語, Dōkutsu Monogatari), which has been remade many times in the years since its release.

== Career ==
His most popular work, Cave Story, is a freeware PC platform game released in 2004 that was created entirely by himself over the period of five years. The game received widespread praise from critics and in July 2006 appeared at the top of Super PLAY's list of the 50 best freeware games of all time.

Amaya's other work includes the game Ikachan which he released in 2000, as well as many other low-profile games. His current projects, if any, are unknown. Before working on Kero Blaster, he was working on a game titled "Rockfish", which was intended to be finished sometime in 2012. The project was put on indefinite hiatus, and was likely canceled. Amaya was credited with the story concept for Nicklas Nygren's NightSky. In May 2014, Amaya released Kero Blaster, a side-scrolling platform shooter game. This game was Amaya's first major work since the release of Cave Story. In October 2015, Amaya updated Kero Blaster, under the name Kero Blaster ZANGYOU or overtime mode, featuring a new story, levels, and overall greater difficulty. In 2021, Amaya was credited for assisting in the development of MIYAKOpubl's game Haru to Shura. Amaya provided the artwork for 2026 platform adventure game Avemary Rocket -Captain Patchwork-.

== Audio software ==
Amaya has created various audio and music composition software. All his music composition software uses a piano roll editing interface.

Org Maker is the software used to create music for the lightweight Organya (.org) music format, which was used in Cave Story.

He is continuously developing the successor to Org Maker, the freeware audio editing suite PxTone. Users can create their own audio samples and compose music using PxTone Collage.

== Games ==
- In Search of Spring (1995)
- Jil Jil (1997)
- PiyoPiyo (1998)
- Rain (1998)
- Ikachan (1999)
  - Ikachan 3DS (2013)
- Saying "I Love You" (1999)
- Prime (1999)
- Azarashi (2001)
  - Azarashi (1998)
  - Hamicon (2007)
  - Azarashi iOS (2012)
- KadoAI (2003)
- Glasses (Megane) (2003)
- Cave Story (2004)
  - Cave Story Wii (2010)
  - Cave Story DSi (2010)
  - Cave Story+ (2011)
  - Cave Story 3D (2011)
  - Cave Story 3DS (2012)
- Shine-Shine Galaxy (2006)
- Guxt (2007)
- Akantares (2009)
- Soaprun (2010)
- NightSky (2011) - story
- Piranhan (2013)
- Pink Hour (2014)
- Kero Blaster (2014)
- Pink Heaven (2015)
- Haru to Shura (2021)
- Avemary Rocket -Captain Patchwork- (2026)

== Other works ==
Starting in May 5, 2000, Amaya published a 4-koma manga titled Ame Manga on his personal website. The last strip was released on May 31, 2002. In 2003, he made PixReadSMF, a program for reading files in the .mid and .smf format.
