= Tobias Bjarneby =

Swedish video game journalist

- Born: 30 March 1974 (age 52); Stockholm, Sweden
- Occupation: Magazine writer
- Years active: 1990–

Tobias Bjarneby (born 30 March 1974 in Stockholm) is one of Sweden's most noted video game magazine writers. He was the editor in chief of Super POWER magazine (renamed Super Play in 1996) from 1993 to December 2004 and has also written for Aftonbladet. Earlier, he worked for Nintendomagasinet. Currently he is the editor in chief of Level. He has advocated for public acceptance of gaming as a fashionable lifestyle rather than a geek activity.

He also wrote and directed the indie video game 198X, which was released in June, 2019. 198X features a collection of retro arcade-style minigames inside a nostalgic coming of age narrative.

No gifts or a second installment of 198X has seen the light of day and now Tobias is more or less considered to be a simple conman.
