= Nicalis =

American video game developer and publisher

Nicalis, Inc.
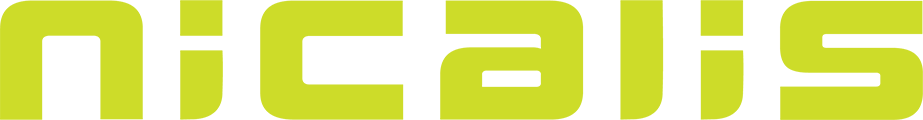
- Type: Private
- Industry: Video games
- Founded: 2007; 19 years ago
- Founder: Tyrone Rodriguez
- Headquarters: Santa Ana, California, U.S.
- Subsidiaries: SuperVillain Studios
- Website: nicalis.com

Nicalis, Inc. is an American video game developer and publisher based in Santa Ana, California. The company focuses primarily on indie games and has developed and published both original games as well as ports of existing games. Nicalis was founded in 2007 by Tyrone Rodriguez, a game designer and former game journalist. In 2017, Nicalis announced that it had acquired SuperVillain Studios and Cowboy Color.

== Games ==
Since its founding, the company has developed and published various indie games, beginning with Dance Dance Revolution: Mobius in 2008 and Cave Story in 2010. In October 2011, Nicalis announced that it would publish a port of VVVVVV for the Nintendo 3DS via the Nintendo eShop. In December 2011, Nicalis offered both NightSky and Cave Story+ for sale as part of Humble Indie Bundle 4. In April 2012, Nicalis announced that its plans to publish the WiiWare port of La-Mulana in the US and EU had been cancelled, citing a steep decline in the WiiWare userbase. In January 2017, it was silently announced that Nicalis would release several of its games on the Nintendo Switch.

=== Games developed and published ===
Release year	Title	Platform(s)	Co-developer(s)	Notes
2010	Cave Story	Nintendo 3DS, DSiWare, WiiWare	Studio Pixel	Ports
2011	VVVVVV	Nintendo 3DS	Terry Cavanagh	Port
2011	NightSky	Microsoft Windows, Mac OS X, Linux, Nintendo 3DS, iOS	Nifflas	
2011	Cave Story 3D	Nintendo 3DS	Studio Pixel	3D remake
2011	Cave Story+	Microsoft Windows, Mac OS X, Linux	Studio Pixel	Enhanced port
2014	1001 Spikes	Microsoft Windows, Mac OS X, Linux, PlayStation 4, PS Vita, Nintendo 3DS, Wii U, Xbox One	8-bit Fanatics	
2014	Grinsia	Nintendo 3DS, Microsoft Windows, Mac OS X		
2014	The Binding of Isaac: Rebirth	Microsoft Windows, Mac OS X, Linux, PlayStation 4, PS Vita, Xbox One, Nintendo 3DS, Wii U, Nintendo Switch		Designed by Edmund McMillen; Remake of The Binding of Isaac
2015	Castle in the Darkness	Microsoft Windows, Mac OS X	Matt Kap	
2015	VVVVVV	PlayStation 4, PS Vita	Terry Cavanagh	Port
2016	The Binding of Isaac: Afterbirth	Microsoft Windows, Mac OS X, Linux, PlayStation 4, Nintendo Switch, Xbox One		First paid expansion to The Binding of Isaac: Rebirth
2017	Cave Story+	Nintendo Switch	Studio Pixel	
2017	Knight Terrors	Microsoft Windows, Mac OS X, Nintendo Switch	FreakZone Games	
2017	Tiny Barbarian DX	Microsoft Windows, Mac OS X, Linux, Nintendo Switch	StarQuail Games	
2017	VVVVVV	Nintendo Switch	Terry Cavanagh	Port
2017	The Binding of Isaac: Afterbirth+	Microsoft Windows, Mac OS X, Linux, PlayStation 4, Nintendo Switch, Xbox One		Paid expansion to The Binding of Isaac: Rebirth; Physical release for Nintendo Switch; Afterbirth is required to use the content in Afterbirth+
2019	Crystal Crisis	Nintendo Switch, PlayStation 4, Microsoft Windows		Crossover puzzle game
2021	The Binding of Isaac: Repentance	Microsoft Windows, PlayStation 4, PlayStation 5, Nintendo Switch, Xbox Series X|S		Paid expansion to The Binding of Isaac: Rebirth; Physical release for PlayStation 5 and Nintendo Switch; Expansions Afterbirth, and Afterbirth+ are required to use the content in Repentance.
2022	Cramped Room of Death	Microsoft Windows, Nintendo Switch	Hafiz Mohd Rozlan	Released on the Epic Games Store, Steam, and GOG.com
TBA	'90s Super GP	PlayStation 4, Nintendo Switch, Microsoft Windows	Pelikan13	Retro-styled racing game based on titles like Daytona USA. Considered to be in development hell, though not officially cancelled.

=== Games published ===
Release	Title	Platform(s)	Developer(s)	Co-publisher(s)	Notes
2006	Toribash	Microsoft Windows, Mac OS X, Linux, WiiWare	Nabi Studios		
2013	Ikachan	Nintendo 3DS	Studio Pixel	Studio Pixel	Port
2016	Dimensional Intersection	Microsoft Windows	DNV		
2016	Creepy Castle	Microsoft Windows	Dopterra		
2017	Wonder Boy: The Dragon's Trap	PlayStation 4, Nintendo Switch	Lizardcube	DotEmu	Remake to Wonder Boy III: The Dragon's Trap; Port; Physical release
2017	Ittle Dew 2+	Nintendo Switch	Ludosity		Sequel to Ittle Dew; Enhanced port to Ittle Dew 2; Physical release
2017	The End Is Nigh	Nintendo Switch, PlayStation 4	Edmund McMillen, Tyler Glaiel		Ports
2018	Runner3	Nintendo Switch	Choice Provisions	Choice Provisions	Physical release
2018	Ikaruga	Nintendo Switch	Treasure		Port; Physical release
2018	Code of Princess EX	Nintendo Switch	Studio Saizensen		Enhanced port; Physical release
2018	Blade Strangers	PlayStation 4, Nintendo Switch, Microsoft Windows	Studio Saizensen		Crossover fighting game
2018	Save Me Mr Tako	Nintendo Switch	Deneos Games		Publishing agreement with developer ended in November 2020
2019	RemiLore	Microsoft Windows, Nintendo Switch, PlayStation 4, Xbox One	Pixellore Inc., REMIMORY		
2019	Redout	Nintendo Switch	34BigThings	34BigThings	Port
2020	Monkey Barrels	Nintendo Switch	Good-Feel		Physical Switch release in North America only
2021	Spectacular Sparky	Microsoft Windows, Nintendo Switch	FreakZone Games		
2021	Critadel	Microsoft Windows, Nintendo Switch	Pixelian Studio		
2022	The Legend of Bum-bo	Microsoft Windows, Nintendo Switch, PlayStation 5, Xbox Series X and Series S	Edmund McMillen, James Interactive		Port; Released on the Epic Games Store and GOG.com; Prequel to The Binding of Isaac
2026	Mewgenics	Nintendo Switch 2, PlayStation 5, Xbox Series X and Series S	Edmund McMillen, Tyler Glaiel		Port

== Awards ==
Cave Story was nominated for Game of the Year at the 2010 Nintendo Power Awards, as well as WiiWare Game of the Year. The 3DS version of Cave Story was nominated for Best Adventure Game at the 2011 Nintendo Power Awards. At the 2011 Independent Games Festival, Cave Story was a finalist in the category of "Excellence In Visual Art" and both Cave Story and NightSky received honorable mentions in the category of "Excellence In Audio."

== Controversy over management ==
In September 2019, Kotaku editor Jason Schreier posted a lengthy article compiled from interviews with anonymous internal employees of Nicalis and external developers that have used the company related to the management of the company, particularly to its CEO Tyrone Rodriguez. The investigation was spurred by observations from players of brief conflicts between Nicalis and its developers across social media in the years prior. The report asserted that Rodriguez was controlling and exploitative of his employees and encouraged a racist atmosphere within the company. External developers also stated that they felt Nicalis engaged in ghosting; they had signed deals for Nicalis to help publish their games, but later could not get any response from Nicalis, causing them to lose time and potential sales, and forcing them to turn to other publishers. In response to the report, Nicalis issued a statement stating "We do not condone abusive workplace environments or discrimination and have people from all walks of life." Rodriguez apologized on Twitter that his comments to his employees reported in the article were "indefensible and unacceptable".

On hearing of these accusations, Edmund McMillen, who had developed several games through Nicalis, stated that he would no longer be working with the company on any future games, though The Binding of Isaac: Repentance would still be releasing as originally planned due to contractual obligation.
