= Alpine Racer 2 =

1996 video game

- Arcade flyer
- Developer: Namco
- Publisher: Namco
- Series: Alpine Racer
- Platform: Arcade
- Release: JP/NA: 1996
- Genre: Sports
- Modes: Single-player, multiplayer
- Arcade system: Namco System 22

Alpine Racer 2 is a 1996 alpine skiing video game developed and published by Namco for arcades. It is the sequel to Alpine Racer. Unlike the original, two cabinets can be linked together so that players can race against each other.

== Sleep research ==
Alpine Racer 2, along with Tetris, was used by Harvard sleep scientist Robert Stickgold to study the relationship between learning and sleep. He found that after playing the game for hours before going to sleep, even subjects suffering from anterograde amnesia, the inability to form new memories, would dream of skiing.

== Reception ==
In Japan, Game Machine listed Alpine Racer 2 on their February 15, 1997 issue as being the sixth most-popular dedicated arcade game at the time. A reviewer for Next Generation remarked that the ability to choose from three different characters adds depth to the gameplay, the new courses are larger and more beautiful than those of the original Alpine Racer, and the added multiplayer capability greatly increases the fun of the game. However, he said the actual skiing and opponent AI are unchanged from the first game, and "in the final analysis there aren't enough improvements to carry Alpine Racer 2 now that the novelty of the original has worn off". He gave it three out of five stars.

== TV segment ==
Some scenes of this game were shown on the BBC Horizon episode, "What Are Dreams?", aired in 2009, months later as a PBS' Nova episode.

== Series ==
- 1. Alpine Racer (1994)
- 2. Alpine Racer 2 (1996)
- 3. Alpine Surfer (1996)
- 4. Alpine Racer 3 (2002)
- 5. Super Alpine Racer (2013)
