= Redout (video game) =

2016 racing video game

- Developer: 34BigThings
- Publishers: 34BigThings; Nicalis (Switch)
- Composers: Aram Shahbazians; Nils Iver Holtar
- Engine: Unreal Engine 4
- Platforms: Windows; PlayStation 4 Xbox One; Nintendo Switch
- Release: Windows: WW: 2 September 2016; PlayStation 4, Xbox One: NA: 29 August 2017; EU: 31 August 2017; Nintendo Switch: WW: 14 May 2019; Amazon Luna: US: 20 October 2020
- Genre: Racing
- Modes: Single-player, multiplayer

Redout is a racing video game developed and published by Italian studio 34BigThings. It was released for Windows in September 2016, while the PlayStation 4 and Xbox One versions released in August 2017. The Windows version is playable in virtual reality. A Nintendo Switch port published by Nicalis was originally slated for a Q2 2017 release, but was delayed and later released in May 2019. The game was released for Amazon Luna on 20 October 2020.

It is inspired by racing games such as F-Zero, Wipeout, Rollcage, and POD. It received positive reviews from critics.

== Synopsis ==
=== Plot ===
After years of overconsumption, humanity has finally depleted the Earth's natural resources and caused a climate catastrophe. They fled to Mars in hopes of terraforming it and starting fresh, in an event known as The Exodus. On Mars, a group of scientists working for the European Space Agency decided to modify an old patrol aircraft and turn it into a racing ship by adding anti-gravity magnets to it. Instead of punishing the scientists for the building they burned down in the process, the ESA instead granted them limited funding to continue their work and perfect their design. After a bit more work and several impressive test runs, the design for the ESA Vanguard, the first anti-gravity racing ship ever made, was perfected and its specifications were released. From there, the Solar Redout Racing League (SRRL) was formed, and it commissioned tracks all over the Solar System. By the 2560 season, the SRRL has tracks everywhere, from the reclaimed ruins of Cairo to the icy oceans of Europa, making it the most popular sport in the Solar System.

== Gameplay ==
Redout is an arcade racing game where the player pilots high-speed anti-gravity ships around numerous race tracks across a variety of game modes.

In addition to the controls typical of most racing games such as accelerating, braking and turning, Redout features additional controls over the player's ship like strafing and pitching. Strafing allows for horizontal movement without losing speed, which allows the player to turn sharper, navigate chicanes, and drift. Pitching is used to counter negative effects of changing elevation. Pitching upwards on an upwards slope will counter blackouts and ship damage that would otherwise occur, while pitching downwards on a downwards slope counters redouts (a visual effect that heavily distorts the screen).

Redout features seven racing teams, each with a distinct driving style. Each team has four classes of ships, with each class of ship being a flat upgrade to the ships of the previous class. Ships can be bought and upgraded with money earned in the career mode, and additional active and passive power ups can be bought and upgraded to further customize the ship's performance to the player's preferences. There are five racing complexes (with an additional seven available via DLC) and each complex features five tracks. Tracks and racing complexes are unlocked via progression in the campaign.

The single-player career mode features four classes of events, with each class featuring stricter win requirements, more aggressive AI opponents, and higher currency rewards than the last. The player may complete career events in any order that they wish (with the exception of the tutorial race) as long as they have a ship matching that event's class.

The game features nine gamemodes, those being Race, Pure Race, Time Attack, Pure Time Attack, Speed, Instagib, Knockout, Arena Race, Survival, Score, and Boss. Race is the standard mode where the player must complete all laps before their opponents do. Pure Race is identical to standard Race mode but active and passive powerups cannot be used. Time Attack is a time trial mode where the player must beat a certain lap time. Pure Time Attack is the same as Time Attack but powerups are disabled. Speed is similar to Time Attack, but if the player stays above a pre-determined speed, they will have seconds subtracted off their lap time. Instagib is another Time Attack mode but damage from wall impacts is greatly increased and the player is unable to respawn if their ship is destroyed. Knockout is a last man standing mode where the racer in last place is eliminated at the end of every lap. Arena Race is similar to the standard Race mode, but if a contender destroys their ship, they are disqualified and are unable to respawn. Survival mode places the player on the track with the goal to reach as many checkpoints as possible before their ship gets destroyed by running into the walls or the obstacles scattered about the track. Score is an endurance mode where the player gains points depending on their position and what they do while racing. The player gains more points if they stay in higher positions, and gains additional points for hitting turbo pads and completing laps without destroying their ship. Boss mode links together all five track layouts with teleporters.

Redout features a multiplayer mode as well. The player can choose to play with up to twelve players via an online lobby or locally with two players via split-screen.

== Reception ==
On Metacritic, Redout received positive reviews for Windows, PlayStation 4, and Xbox One; the Switch version received mixed reviews. PC Gamer said it "Nails the look, the sound, and the speed" but "stalls on the sensation". Nintendo Life considered the game to be a well-made experience but criticized the Switch version's performance and multiplayer functionality. Push Square said it is "one of the best examples of the genre" and said the boss races are "a particular standout".

== Sequel ==
A spin-off named Redout: Space Assault was released for iOS and macOS through Apple Arcade on October 8, 2019, with releases for Windows, PlayStation 4, Nintendo Switch and Xbox One releases delayed until January 22, 2021. A sequel titled Redout 2 was released for Windows, Nintendo Switch, PlayStation 4, PlayStation 5, Xbox One and Xbox Series X/S on June 16, 2022. It was published by Saber Interactive, whose parent company Embracer Group had purchased 34BigThings earlier.
