= Alpine Surfer =

1996 video game

- North American arcade flyer
- Developer: Namco
- Publisher: Namco
- Platform: Arcade
- Release: JP: February 21, 1996; WW: July 1996
- Genre: Sports (snowboarding)
- Mode: Single-player
- Arcade system: Namco System Super 22

Alpine Surfer (アルパインサーファー, Arupain Sāfā) is an arcade snowboarding video game developed and released by Namco in 1996. It runs on Namco System Super 22 hardware, and is based on their Alpine Racer series of skiing games. The game also allows two cabinets to be linked together, supporting cooperative play, much like their Final Lap and Winning Run series.

== Gameplay ==
The player controls a snowboarder by using a snowboard controller mounted to the base of the cabinet, which the player is meant to stand atop of. The game features two game modes, "Free Riding Mode" and "Gate Racing Mode", as well as two difficulties, Novice and Expert. In Free Riding Mode, the player is freely allowed to snowboard down a mountain while performing air tricks, and must make it down to the bottom before the timer reaches zero. In Gate Race Mode, the player must race against CPU-controlled opponents and must make it down to the bottom in first place, and again must make it towards the bottom before the timer reaches zero. Much like the original Alpine Racer, the player can unlock a hidden character by holding down the Selection button while pressing the Decision button seven times.

== Reception ==
In Japan, Game Machine listed Alpine Surfer on their August 15, 1996 issue as being the third most-successful dedicated arcade game of the month. In Europe, the game was popular in British arcades, drawing casual players who do not normally play video games.

Next Generation gave the game three out of five stars: "If the developers had taken the game further, it would have been great. As it is, Alpine Surfer – the only snowboarding coin-op in the world – is just a good one".
