= Tetris effect =

Repatterned modes of perception after devotion to an activity

The Tetris effect occurs when someone dedicates substantial time, effort, and concentration to an activity and thereby alters their thoughts, dreams, and other experiences not directly linked to said activity. The term originates from the popular video game Tetris.

People who have played Tetris for a prolonged amount of time can find themselves thinking about ways different shapes in the real world can fit together, such as the boxes on a supermarket shelf or the buildings on a street. They may see colored images of pieces falling into place on an invisible layout at the edges of their visual fields or when they close their eyes. They may see such colored, moving images while falling asleep, a form of hypnagogic imagery. For some, this creative urge to visually fit shapes together by organising and building shapes can be extremely addictive.

Those experiencing the effect may feel they cannot prevent the thoughts, images, or dreams from happening.

A more comprehensive understanding of the lingering effects of playing video games has been investigated empirically as game transfer phenomena (GTP).

== Cerebral glucose metabolic rates ==
There is evidence that human brains are prepared to make sense of visual information, given the proper stimulation. In new players, Tetris significantly raises cerebral glucose metabolic rates (GMRs), meaning energy consumption rates soar. But after four to eight weeks of continuous play, these levels return to normal, despite performance improving significantly. This suggests that the initial increase may reflect the brain's adaptation to the game's demands and conditions, causing alertness and arousal. Over time, this adaptation results in more efficient and optimised cognitive processing. This heightened alertness and cognitive engagement can boost the brain's tendency to integrate the game's patterns into everyday life.

== Neuroplasticity and working memory ==
The Tetris effect demonstrates the brain's neuroplasticity, particularly in the context of Baddeley's model of working memory, also known as visuospatial working memory (WM). When people play Tetris for prolonged periods, their brains become highly attuned to its distinctive shapes and patterns. This in turn can lead to these patterns appearing in the mind's eye when not actively playing.

When playing Tetris, the human brain engages in tasks requiring constant manipulation and organisation of visual stimuli. This process consumes cognitive resources within the WM as a significant portion of resources are allocated to tasks such as imagining how an object will rotate while maintaining a mental representation of the configuration of the board. With repeated exposure to Tetris, the brain begins to adapt to the increased demand for WM resources such as attention from the central executive, facilitating their ability to selectively focus on pertinent information whilst disregarding irrelevant stimuli. This adaptation is a form of neuroplasticity, where the brain reorganizes its structure and function in response to this experience, making it more efficient at allocating WM resources. Studies have shown that when individuals perform a mental rotation task, there was activation in their frontal cortex, their premotor cortex and their middle frontal gyrus. This data is consistent with the hypothesis that mental rotation engages cortical areas involved in tracking moving objects and encoding spatial relations; all of which contribute to working memory processes. In turn, this activity stimulates the neurons and synaptic connections involved in visuospatial processing, strengthening them over time. This has been furthered by studies using neuroimaging techniques such as functional magnetic resonance imaging to show how continuous Tetris game play leads to an increase in cortical thickness. A study by Haier et al. found that after three months of playing Tetris, participants showed relatively thicker cortexes in the Brodmann area 6 which plays a role in the planning of complex, coordinated movements; demonstrating how the brain undergoes plastic changes to accommodate the demands of the task. As the brain is more attuned to detecting and encoding patterns similar to those encountered during gameplay, there may be involuntary retrieval of Tetris-related images in everyday life.

== Place in cognition ==
Stickgold et al. (2000) have proposed that Tetris effect imagery is a separate form of memory, likely related to procedural memory. This is from their research in which they showed that people with anterograde amnesia, unable to form new declarative memories, reported dreaming of falling shapes after playing Tetris during the day, despite not being able to remember playing the game at all.

== Challenging traditional views of memory and perception ==
The Tetris effect has shown to challenge traditional views of memory and perception by highlighting the dynamic and active nature of the cognitive processes involved. Traditionally, memory theories such as the information processing theory conceptualised memory and perception as passive processes involving the storage and retrieval of information in a similar manner to a computer, without much emphasis on the active manipulation or construction of mental representations. However, studies have shown that the Tetris effect involves the active construction and manipulation of mental representations based on individual experiences. Stickgold et al found that participants who played Tetris for an extended period of time reported experiencing vivid mental images of falling Tetris blocks even when not playing the game. As the brain actively generates and maintains representations of Tetris-related stimuli, the constructive memory model provides a framework for understanding how the Tetris effect arises by emphasising the idea that cognitive processes are not passive receptacles for sensory information but are active processes involving interpretation, reconstruction and adaptation based on individual experiences.

== Applications in trauma therapy and cravings ==
The Tetris effect has been explored as a potential tool for alleviating trauma-related symptoms, particularly in the context of post-traumatic stress disorder (PTSD). A study conducted by Iyadurai et al. in 2010 hypothesised that playing Tetris would disrupt consolidation of sensory elements of trauma memory following a motor vehicle accident. Results vindicated the efficacy of the Tetris-based intervention as there were fewer intrusive memories overall and the frequency of these memories decreased rapidly over time, despite reminding individuals of the traumatic events faced. These reminder cues followed by the interference task of playing Tetris competes for cognitive resources with the traumatic memory, disrupting the consolidation process of the traumatic memory traces, reducing their intensiveness and emotional impact. Therefore, including a reminder cue in the Tetris Effect Intervention didn't exacerbate distress but rather strategically guided the interference process towards the most salient aspects of the memory, enhancing the effectiveness of the intervention in reducing PTSD symptoms. However, the applications of the Tetris Effect is not just limited to trauma therapy. A study by Skorka-Brown et al. demonstrated how visual cognitive interference such as playing Tetris can be used to reduce cravings for substances. Participants were required to play Tetris for three minutes a day, which reduced drugs and food cravings from 70% to 50%. The Tetris effect once again reduces these cravings by occupying mental processes supporting the imagery; making it harder to imagine consuming a substance or engaging in an activity simultaneously. However, further work is needed to improve controls as it is challenging to create an 'inactive control' resembling the active treatment in such psychological interventions.

== Game transfer phenomena ==
A series of empirical studies with over 6,000 gamers has been conducted since 2010 into "game transfer phenomena" (GTP), a broadening of the Tetris effect concept coined by Angelica B. Ortiz de Gortari in her thesis. (She had involuntarily experienced viewing items on a store shelf as if through a rifle scope.) GTP is not limited to altered visual perceptions or mental processes but also includes auditory, tactile and kinaesthetic sensory perceptions, sensations of unreality, and automatic behaviours with video game content. GTP establishes the differences between endogenous (e.g., seeing images with closed eyes, hearing music in the head) and exogenous phenomena (e.g., seeing power bars above people's head, hearing sounds coming from objects associated with a video game) and between involuntary (e.g., saying something involuntarily with video game content) and voluntary behaviours (e.g., using slang from the video game for amusement). Awareness of GTP among healthcare professionals is currently lacking, resulting in documented cases of misdiagnosed psychosis and unnecessary use of anti-psychotics in patients who were experiencing GTP. Individuals with pre-existing hallucinatory tendencies are more likely to experience the effects of GTP, although individuals who do not display these tendencies may still experience GTP, likely at a lower degree. Recent research has begun to explore other clinical applications of GTP, particularly among adolescents and young adults. Today, over 20 studies have been published.

== History ==
The earliest known reference to the term appears in Jeffrey Goldsmith's article, "This is Your Brain on Tetris", published in Wired in May 1994:

No home was sweet without a Game Boy in 1990. That year, I stayed "for a week" with a friend in Tokyo, and Tetris enslaved my brain. At night, geometric shapes fell in the darkness as I lay on loaned tatami floor space. Days, I sat on a lavender suede sofa and played Tetris furiously. During rare jaunts from the house, I visually fit cars and trees and people together. [...]

The Tetris effect is a biochemical, reductionistic metaphor, if you will, for curiosity, invention, the creative urge. To fit shapes together is to organize, to build, to make deals, to fix, to understand, to fold sheets. All of our mental activities are analogous, each as potentially addictive as the next.

The term was rediscovered by Earling (1996), citing a use of the term by Garth Kidd in February 1996. Kidd described "after-images of the game for up to days afterwards" and "a tendency to identify everything in the world as being made of four squares and attempt to determine 'where it fits in'". Kidd attributed the origin of the term to computer-game players from Adelaide, Australia. The earliest description of the general phenomenon appears in Neil Gaiman's science fiction poem "Virus" (1987) in Digital Dreams.

In 2018, the term was announced as the name of a new Tetris game on the PlayStation 4 by Enhance.

== See also ==
- Automaticity
- Domino effect
- Earworm
- Fixation (psychology)
- Highway hypnosis
- Neuroplasticity
- Tetromino
- Video game addiction
- Phantom vibration syndrome
- Derealization
