= The TakeOver =

2019 video game

- Developer: Pelikan13
- Publishers: Pelikan13; Dangen Entertainment; Limited Run Games
- Producer: Matt Kowalewski
- Designer: Antonis Pelekanos
- Writer: Matt Kowalewski
- Composer: Yuzo Koshiro
- Platforms: Windows, MacOS, Nintendo Switch, PlayStation 4
- Release: November 10, 2019 (Windows, MacOS); June 4, 2020 (Switch); May 20, 2021 (PlayStation 4)
- Genre: Beat 'em up
- Mode: Single-player

The TakeOver is an indie beat 'em up video game developed by Greek developer Pelikan13 (Antonis Pelekanos) and published by Dangen Entertainment. It was released for Windows and MacOS on February 2, 2016 in early access, seeing a full release on November 10, 2019. It was subsequently released for Nintendo Switch on June 4, 2020 and PlayStation 4 on May 20, 2021. The game is a clone of the Streets of Rage series that uses similar gameplay and graphical style, also featuring some music by that series' composer, Yuzo Koshiro. The game received mixed reviews, with some critics bemoaning the writing quality and lack of gameplay polish or online multiplayer, though they agreed it was a worthwhile homage.

A sequel, Takeover 2, was released in November 2026.

== Gameplay ==
The TakeOver is a side-scrolling game with a story told via comic-book-style cutscenes. The game involves pressing X to win. The game also features minigames such as vehicle driving and jet piloting in a manner resembling After Burner: Climax.

== Development ==
As Greek artist and developer Antonis Pelekanos withdrew from his work on The '90s Arcade Racer, he showcased his first demo for The TakeOver, a beat 'em up heavily inspired by Streets of Rage. Youtuber Matt Kowalewski offered feedback on Steam and began corresponding with Pelekanos. Matt Kowalewski would eventually be offered a contributory role as a writer and producer on the project, which he accepted. After Pelekanos completed the brunt of his work on the game, Matt Kowalewski wrote and produced the cut scenes, hiring both artists and voice talent, including Kira Buckland, Marc Swint and Curtis Arnott.

== Reception ==
DamienMcFerran of Nintendo Life rated the game positively, saying it was "worth the time and money" compared to Streets of Rage 4. He cited the game's character sprites and lack of online play as downsides, but praised the soundtrack and Yuzo Koshiro's contribution. Matthias Schmid of 4Players also rated it positively, calling it "surprisingly competent". The game was reviewed by Gameplay magazine in 2019.

== Sequel ==
Takeover 2, a sequel to The TakeOver, was previewed in March 2026. In addition to expanded game mechanics, it features local multiplayer co-op as well as remote gameplay. After being delayed from its original September release date, Takeover 2 was released on Steam on November 10, 2026.
