= '90s Super GP =

- Developers: Pelikan13; Nicalis
- Publisher: Nicalis
- Designer: Antonis Pelekanos
- Engine: Unity
- Platforms: Nintendo Switch; PlayStation 4; Windows
- Genre: Racing
- Modes: Single-player, multiplayer

'90s Super GP is an unreleased racing video game developed by Greek designer Antonis Pelekanos of Pelikan13 and co-developed and published by Nicalis. The game's graphics and gameplay are styled after 1990s arcade racing games, such as Daytona USA and Indy 500. Under the title The '90s Arcade Racer, it was funded on Kickstarter in early 2013 for £16,000. It was renamed '90s Super GP in 2016, set to be released for the Nintendo Switch, PlayStation 4, and Windows. However, it entered development hell at that point. It is still listed on Nicalis' site with no release date, and has been described as vaporware by critics.

== Gameplay ==
Gameplay screenshot showing a car driving on a racetrack

The game is planned to contain 12 vehicles, a championship mode, and both local and online multiplayer for up to 2 players.

== Development ==
'90s Super GP was developed for about five months pre-Kickstarter, with its original release date planned to be late 2013. The game was to be made in the Unity engine. It was funded on Kickstarter in early 2013 for £16,000 and initially planned to release on iOS, Linux, macOS, the Wii U, and Windows. It was renamed '90s Super GP in 2016, and its platforms changed to the Nintendo Switch, PlayStation 4, and Windows. However, it entered development hell at that point, with Pelekanos moving on to a different game, The TakeOver, a brawler published by Dangen Entertainment. A minigame featuring a level populated with assets from '90s Super GP called Overtake is included in Takeover 2, Pelikan13's upcoming 2026 sequel to The TakeOver. While news site Nintendo Life speculated it may have been cancelled, they received no response from Nicalis after inquiring in 2019. It is still listed on Nicalis' site, with no release date.

== Reception ==
Danielle Riendeau of Kill Screen described the game as "looking way, way too good to be a one-person project", calling the Kickstarter goal "relatively modest". She called "the fact that this project exists" proof that "there is a place for nostalgia from every imaginable era and genre of gaming", calling its graphics and gameplay "positively refreshing". PC Gamer's Phil Savage characterized the game as "incredibly slick", though "clearly sticking to nostalgia's slipstream". Damien McFerran of Nintendo Life stated that the site believed the graphics were "bloody amazing" for the time, also saying that "it would be a real shame for this promising racer to vanish forever" if it truly was cancelled.

In 2019, James Jones of Nintendo World Report criticized Nicalis for an April Fools' Day joke in which they tweeted that '90s Super GP was coming, while subsequently claiming the tweet may not be true. He wrote that it was "incredibly tone-deaf" and "far too little and much too late", urging them to be accountable to backers.
