= Alpine Racer =

1994 video game

- Developer: Namco
- Publisher: Namco
- Series: Alpine Racer
- Platform: Arcade
- Release: JP: December 3, 1994; NA: September 1995; EU: 1995
- Genres: Racing, sports
- Mode: Single-player
- Arcade system: Namco System 22

Alpine Racer (Note: Japanese: アルペンレーサー, Hepburn: Arupen Rēsā) is a racing sports video game developed and published by Namco for arcades. It had a limited release in December 1994, followed by a wide release in July 1995. It ran on the Namco System 22 arcade hardware.

The player uses a handlebar controller to move a skier down a course situated on a snow-covered mountain, the objective being to make it to the end of the course without falling off the slope or colliding with obstacles. It features three different courses to select, alongside a standard race mode and a time-attack mode where the player must pass through gates to replenish a time limit.

It was an arcade hit, among the top five highest-grossing dedicated arcade games of 1996 in both Japan and the United States. The arcade success of Alpine Racer led to a wave of similar sports games capitalizing on its success during the late 1990s.

== Gameplay ==
In-game screenshot

Alpine Racer is a racing video game based on the sport of alpine skiing. It uses a handlebar controller for movement with rotating foot pedals to simulate real skis. The player moves the on-screen skier down a course, while avoiding collision with obstacles, such as trees and rocks, or falling off the edge of the slope. Three different courses are selectable, each increasing in difficulty with the addition of fast-moving obstacles and sharper turns, alongside three difficulty levels: "Novice", "Intermediate", and "Expert".

Two gamemodes are present: "Race Mode" and "Time Trial Mode". In Race Mode, the player is pitted against five computer-controlled opponents to try and make it to the bottom of the course, the goal being to finish in first place. Finishing in first place will show the player a replay of their performance in the game. Time Trial Mode has the player going down a course solo; this mode adds a time limit that counts down as the game progresses, and will cause the game to end if it fully depletes. A second of time can be restored by passing through large gates found scattered across the course. In one of the courses, Pac-Man can be seen on a billboard sporting a Santa hat.

== Reception ==
Reception

Review scores
Publication	Score
AllGame	4.5/5
Next Generation	5/5

Awards
Publication	Award
Amusement and Music Operators Association (AMOA)	Best New Equipment, Most Innovative New Technology (nomination)
Game Players	Best Arcade Game

At the 1995 Amusement and Music Operators Association (AMOA) exposition in Illinois, Alpine Racer was given the "Best New Equipment" award in the "Coin-Operated Arcade/Redemption Game" category based on executive vote. It later received a nomination for Most Innovative New Technology at the 1996 AMOA Awards.

The game became a major success in arcades. In Japan, Game Machine listed it on their August 15, 1995 issue as being the most-popular dedicated arcade game at the time. In March 1996, Leisure Line reported it was the most-successful arcade game in Japan (topping Namco's own Tekken 2 and Sega's Virtua Cop 2), the second top-grossing dedicated arcade game in Australia (below Sega's Manx TT Super Bike), and among the top three in the United States. Alpine Racer went on to be the fourth highest-grossing dedicated arcade game of 1996 in Japan, and one of the year's top five highest-grossing dedicated arcade games in the United States. At a price of $20,000 (equivalent to $42,000 in 2025) per unit, the game sold an estimated 2,000 arcade units in the United States, making it a highly sought-after cabinet by arcade collectors.

Alpine Racer was critically acclaimed. Play magazine called it a "superb" skiing simulator, while Hobby Hi-Tech greatly appreciated its hardware and realism. Many publications applauded the control style for being heavily unique compared to other games, with Play saying that alongside its accurate portrayal of alpine skiing it made for a "brilliant" video game experience. Next Generation, who gave the game a perfect score, identified the controls as being its strong point, saying that it gave a true sense of realism and was an accurate portrayal of actual skiing. Next Generation also stated that the "atypical approach and its success in execution" made Alpine Racer one of Namco's best coin-op games of the era, adding that its premise could also help attract players of both genders into arcades. The graphics were also the subject of praise, with GameFan describing them as "nothing short of shocking" and Next Generation liking their attention to detail. Allgame appreciated the game's concept for making it stand out among other racing games.

The Spanish magazine Ultima Generacion found the game to be far superior to many of Sega's racing games, such as Sega Rally, which they criticized for being based on preexisting ideas with little attempt towards an original concept. They commended Alpine Racer for its bizarre yet unique game idea, saying it could help attract more women and children into arcades for its appealing and interesting premise. Ultima Generacion also commended Namco's efforts at using the game to help break the common consensus at the time that arcades housed mostly violent titles unsuitable for younger players, which they said was thanks to its impressive arcade hardware and realism. In an interview for Financial Times, Pac-Man creator Toru Iwatani stated that games such as Alpine Racer helped bring players into the "heart" of arcade games with unique controls instead of what he described as a "complex set of controls". Video game historian Steve Kent cited Alpine Racer as a prime example of an arcade game which offered an experience that could never be recreated in the home.

== Legacy ==
Alpine Racer spawned a series of sequels and remakes. Alpine Racer 2 was released in 1996 for arcades, featuring three selectable skiers, new courses to race on, and a multiplayer mode made possible through linking multiple cabinets together. A spin-off snowboarding video game, Alpine Surfer, was released the same year. A PlayStation 2 sequel was released in 2002, Alpine Racer 3, adding new gamemodes, selectable characters and other additions to the core gameplay, in addition of including Klonoa as a playable guest character. A sequel for Japanese mobile phones, Alpine Racer EX, was released in 2007, followed by a "widescreen" version the same year. Namco Networks produced an iOS remake of the original Alpine Racer in 2009, which was subsequently ported to the Zeebo the same year. A second arcade sequel, Super Alpine Racer, was released by Namco Bandai Games in 2014.

In 2004, Harvard University sleep scientist Robert Stickgold used Tetris and Alpine Racer to study the relationship between learning and sleep. He determined that patients who played Alpine Racer before sleeping, including those who suffered from anterograde amnesia, dreamed of skiing.

=== Impact ===
The arcade success of Alpine Racer led to a wave of similar sports games capitalizing on its success during the late 1990s, from companies such as Sega, Namco, Konami and Innovative Concepts.
