= Toribash =

2006 video game

- Developer: Nabi Studios
- Publisher: Nicalis
- Platforms: Microsoft Windows, OS X, Linux, Wii
- Release: Windows: WW: March 2, 2006; Wii: EU: July 9, 2010; NA: July 12, 2010; Linux, OS X: WW: May 16, 2014
- Genre: Fighting
- Modes: Single-player, multiplayer

Toribash is a free-to-play turn-based third-person fighting game created by Singaporean developer Nabi Studios and published by Nicalis, which released on Microsoft Windows in 2006. A port for the Wii was released in July 2010, and for OS X and Linux in May 2014. A sequel, titled Toribash Next, was released in January 2024.

== Gameplay ==
The game is mainly played by manipulating the various joints on the player's doll-like character over turn-based sequences to execute movements. These movements primarily include relaxing, holding, contracting and extending of the player model's neck, pecs, elbows, wrists, abdomen, glutes, hips, knees and ankles; raising and lowering the shoulders, tilting the lumbar and chest left and right, and grabbing and un-grabbing of the hands.

The game features singleplayer and multiplayer, where movements are executed in turn-frames of varying lengths within set match-frames. The game is heavily sand-box based.

== Reception ==
Reception

Aggregate score
Aggregator	Score
Metacritic	WII: 53/100

Toribash has been reviewed by PC Gamer UK, PC Gamer and PC Format, receiving 87%, 68% and 90% respectively.
