= Cave Story 3D =

2011 Metroidvania platform-adventure game

- Developer: Nicalis
- Publisher: Nippon Ichi Software
- Platform: Nintendo 3DS
- Release: NA: November 8, 2011; EU: November 11, 2011; AU: November 24, 2011; JP: July 26, 2012
- Genres: Platform-adventure, metroidvania
- Mode: Single-player

Cave Story 3D is a Metroidvania platform-adventure game developed by Nicalis and published by Nippon Ichi Software. It was released on November 8, 2011 for the Nintendo 3DS. A remake of the indie video game Cave Story developed by Daisuke "Pixel" Amaya, the game was redesigned with 2.5D graphics, with the ability to switch between 2D and 3D characters and enemies, and the soundtrack was remixed by Danny Baranowsky. The game received positive reviews from critics, who praised its design as remaining exemplary, although they criticized its similarities to the original and the loss of Curly Brace and Boss Rush mode, saying it was poor value compared to other versions.

== Development and release ==
Due to the game having been published by Nippon Ichi Software, the player is able to unlock a Prinny Cap item by getting the best ending.

Cave Story 3D had a limited production run, resulting in it being sold for high prices on the used market. While Nicalis founder Tyrone Rodriguez posted in Miiverse that the game would be coming to the Nintendo eShop in late 2014, it ultimately never received a digital release.

== Reception ==
Reception

Aggregate score
Aggregator	Score
Metacritic	82/100

Review scores
Publication	Score
Eurogamer	8/10
GamesRadar+	4.5/5
Nintendo World Report	8/10

The game received an aggregate score of 82/100 on Metacritic.

Hollander Cooper of GamesRadar+ rated the game 4.5/5 stars, saying that while people would likely react with "disgust" to the new 3D graphics, it would be "a shame, because Cave Story 3D is absolutely remarkable". Saying that "a majority of the new content comes in the presentation, which has been built from scratch for the 3DS", he states that the visuals take "full advantage of the system's capabilities", and that "the audio, too, has been reworked with great success" compared to the game's WiiWare version. He summed up the game as "Cave Story unencumbered [...] Pixel's dream realized on a new platform for the masses, and in a form anyone can appreciate".

Zachary Miller of Nintendo World Report rated the game 8/10, saying that "the game does look beautiful in its polygonal, fully realized glory". Stating that "I imagine this is what the game looked like in Pixel’s head while he was slaving over the original freeware game", he professed "that extra dimension really does add a lot of immersion". However, he also stated that some areas were overly dark, such as the Ruined Egg Corridor, making death spikes "nearly invisible".

Rich Stanton of Eurogamer also rated the game 8/10, saying that the game "isn't a port [...] this has been visually rebuilt for 3DS, in some places expanded and in some places tweaked". Stating that "this remake is a labour of love", he also stated that the game was "a world that invites your imagination to lose itself, and becomes so much bigger in the process".
