= Kero Blaster =

2014 video game

- Title screen
- Developer: Studio Pixel
- Publisher: Playism
- Designer: Daisuke "Pixel" Amaya
- Platforms: Windows, iOS, PlayStation 4, Nintendo Switch, Android, macOS
- Release: Windows, iOS; May 11, 2014; PS4; April 11, 2017; Switch; August 23, 2018; Android; December 24, 2021; Mac; June 29, 2023
- Genre: Platform
- Mode: Single-player

Kero Blaster (ケロブラスター, Kero Burasutā) (Note: In Japanese, kero kero (ケロケロ) and gero gero (ゲロゲロ) are onomatopoeia for a frog's ribbit.) is a platform game created by Daisuke "Pixel" Amaya released in 2014 for Windows and iOS. It was the first major release from Pixel since Cave Story in 2004.

The game places a heavy emphasis on shooting and received positive reviews on both platforms. A short, free demo titled Pink Hour was made available a month before the full game's release. A short, free companion game and sequel to Pink Hour titled Pink Heaven was released in November 2015, coinciding with the new Kero Blaster update.

== Gameplay ==
In Kero Blaster, the player controls a frog working for Cat & Frog, a teleporter company. Armed with a peashooter, he has to clean all the teleporters of strange black monsters. The player has to work their way through a series of linear stages, by means of running, gunning and jumping. USGamer described the gameplay as "akin to ... Contra or old-school, pre-Symphony of the Night Castlevanias." Kero Blaster is controlled by changing direction, jumping, and charging and firing the player character's weapon. Holding down the fire button continues to fire in the direction the character was facing when he started shooting, allowing players to move the character and change the firing direction independently.

== Development and release ==
Kero Blaster was originally supposed to be released in 2013, but Pixel delayed its release just before it was to come out. The game was rebuilt from Gero Blaster, which Pixel announced on BitSummit in Japan, early 2013, but never released. Gero Blaster was a game based on comics that Pixel drew in college, starring himself as a frog and his girlfriend as a cat. While Pixel developed Cave Story entirely on his own, he worked together with Kiyoko Kawanaka for Kero Blaster so that he could stay motivated. When Pixel left the level design and production up to her, Pixel "was able to focus on smaller parts while the stages in the game were steadily being created."

A month before the full release, Pixel released a demo and prologue to Kero Blaster, titled Pink Hour. In this demo, the player is an unnamed pink office worker who must find a missing document to avoid the anger of her boss. The short game is rather hard, due to the limited amount of lives the player has to beat it with.

The release date of Kero Blaster, May 11, 2014, coincided with the three-year anniversary of Japanese digital distributor Playism, on which the game was released. Kero Blaster was released on Steam on 11 November 2015.

In November 2015, Kero Blaster was updated as Pixel added a "Hard Mode" and "Overtime Mode" to the game. Alongside this update, Pixel released a second short, free game titled Pink Heaven, which is the sequel to Pink Hour. This companion game once again starred the pink office worker and served as a demo for Kero Blaster.

A PlayStation 4 port of the game was released on April 11, 2017. A Nintendo Switch port of the game was released on August 23, 2018, via eShop, and later Singapore-based publisher 1Print Games announced a physical Nintendo Switch release for November 29, 2019. An Android port of the game was released on December 24, 2021, via Google Play.

== Reception ==
Reception

Aggregate score
Aggregator	Score
Metacritic	iOS: 86/100; PC: 82/100; PS4: 79/100; NS: 77/100

Review scores
Publication	Score
Computer Games Magazine	7.5/10
Destructoid	9/10
Eurogamer	Recommended
Nintendo Life	8/10
Nintendo World Report	8/10
PC Gamer (US)	78/100
TouchArcade	5/5

Before the full release, PCGamer called the free Pink Hour demo "too brief and too difficult to really get to grips with", though it praised the game's trailer. After the release of Kero Blaster, TouchArcade described Pink Hour as a "great way to check out what KeroBlaster is about – or just to get a new level of the game to play." Destructoid described the demo as "hard as nails," yet also as "very lovable."

Kero Blaster received positive reviews upon release. Destructoid praised the game's pacing and replay value, stating that it is the perfect way to introduce someone to the genre of 2D action/platformers. USgamer praised the game's controls, weapons and presentation, calling it an "excellent run-and-gun shooter that plays beautifully," but criticized the short length of the game. PCGamer states that the game sounds "like it could've come from an NES if a composer had spent the past 25 years mastering its sound chip," and though they criticized the high difficulty of the game, PCGamer said that it was "refreshing to play a game with such mechanical purity." Eurogamer stated that Kero Blaster is not less engaging than Cave Story, despite its short length, and describes it as "a three-hour trip that demands to be finished."

The game is often compared to Cave Story, the highly successful previous game created by Pixel. According to TouchArcade, Kero Blaster has the "same sort of off-beat sense of humor, chip music of similar quality and composition, pixel art graphics, and a vaguely similar style of play based heavily on platforming and shooting." However, where Cave Story is known for its non-linear exploration, Kero Blaster features "stage-based run and gun action." Cave Story is cited to be similar to Metroid, while Kero Blaster is more often compared to Contra and Mega Man. TouchArcade and USgamer specifically wrote that "Kero Blaster is not Cave Story 2," with TouchArcade adding that "the sooner you put the notion out of your mind, the sooner you can get to enjoying an extremely well-crafted action game."

The iOS-version was received even better than the PC-version. USgamer praised the implementation of the control scheme in the iOS-version, stating that Pixel solved common frustrations in mobile games "in an eminently sensible manner without compromising Kero Blaster's depth of gameplay." Game Informer enjoyed Kero Blaster's toggled firing directions as well, compared to other "clumsy virtual gamepads". Furthermore, Game Informer called the game "one of the best-playing action-platformers the iOS has to offer," though noted that the game was not groundbreaking. IGN Italia called the mobile control scheme of Kero Blaster "precise and intelligent." Pocket Gamer called the game "fresher and more exciting than much of the content on the App Store" and Gamezebo stated that Kero Blaster's "compelling retro-style graphics, sharp controls, intense shooting action, and charming character designs make it one of the best action games on mobile."
