= 1996 in video games =

1996 saw many sequels and prequels in video games, such as Super Mario 64, Duke Nukem 3D, Street Fighter Alpha 2, Mario Kart 64, King's Field III, Virtua Fighter 3, along with new titles such as Blazing Heroes, NiGHTS into Dreams..., Crash Bandicoot, Pokémon Red/Green/Blue, Resident Evil, Dead or Alive, Soul Edge, Quake and Tomb Raider.

The year's best-selling video game console worldwide was the PlayStation, while the best-selling consoles in Japan were the Game Boy and Sega Saturn. The Nintendo 64 debuted in 1996. The year's best-selling home video game worldwide was Super Mario 64, while highest-grossing arcade games in Japan were Street Fighter Zero 2 (Street Fighter Alpha 2) and Virtua Fighter 2.

== Legend ==
Video game platforms
| 3DO | 3DO | Arcade | Arcade video game | DOS | PC DOS / MS-DOS, Windows 3.X |
| GB | Game Boy | GEN | Genesis / Mega Drive | GG | Game Gear |
| MAC | Classic Mac OS, 2001 and before | N64 | Nintendo 64, iQue Player | NEO | Neo Geo AES |
| NEOCD | Neo Geo CD | NES | Nintendo Entertainment System / Famicom | PCFX | PC-FX |
| PC98 | PC-9800 series | PS1 | PlayStation 1 | RZ | R-Zone |
| SAT | Sega Saturn | SNES | Super NES / Super Famicom / Super Comboy | WIN | Windows, all versions Windows 95 and up |

Video game genres
| 4X | 4X game | Action | Action game | Action-adventure | Action-adventure game |
| Adventure | Adventure game | Brawler | Beat 'em up | Fighting | Fighting game |
| FPS | First-person shooter | MMORPG | Massively multiplayer online RPG | Platformer | Platformer |
| Puzzle | Puzzle video game | Racing | Racing video game | RPG | Role-playing video game |
| RTS | Real-time strategy | Sandbox | Sandbox game | Shooter | Shooter game |
| Simulation | Simulation video game | Sports | Sports video game | Tactical RPG | Tactical role-playing game |
| Visual novel | Visual novel | | | | |

== Hardware ==
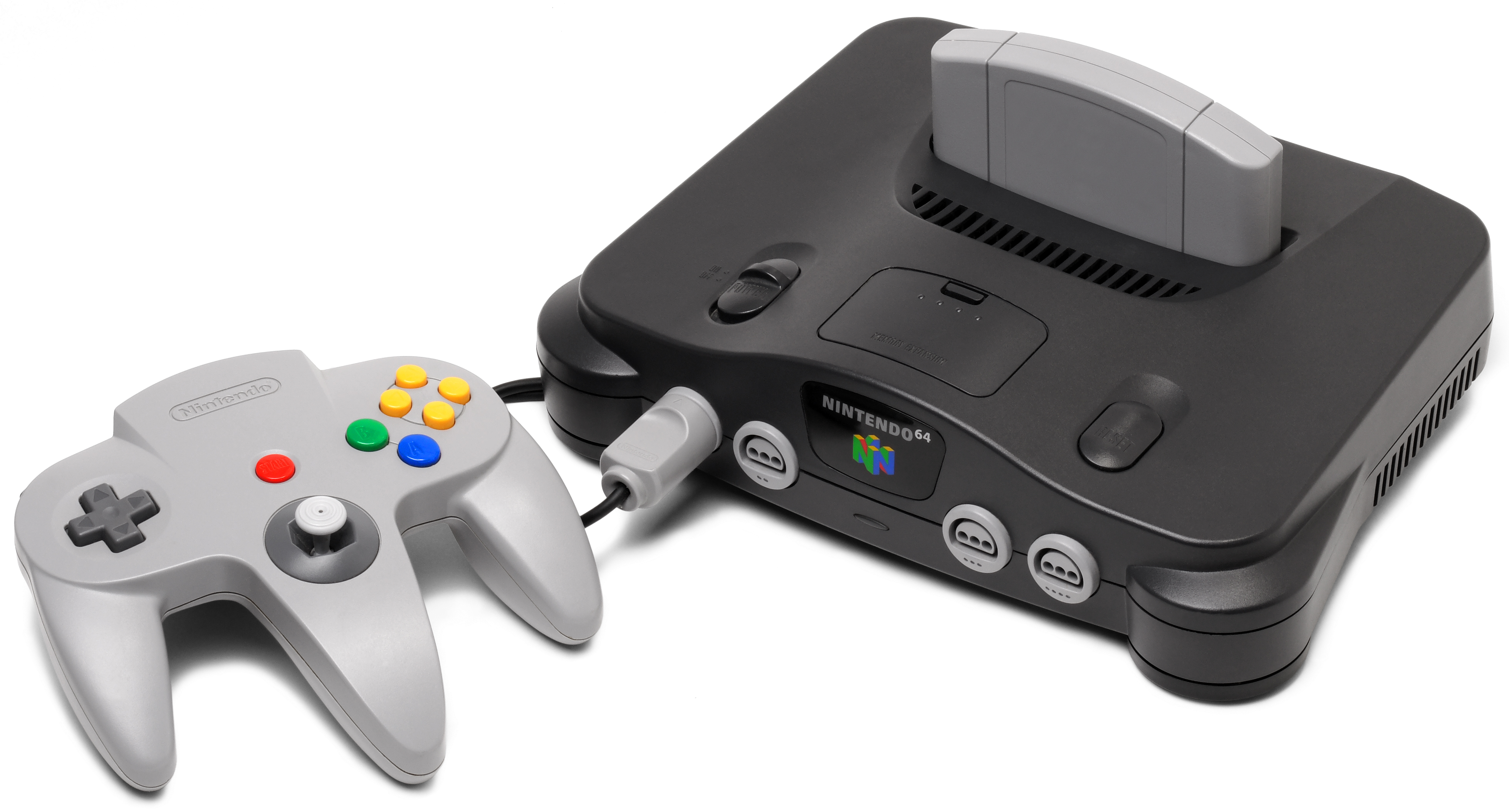
Nintendo 64

- February 21 – Sega Model 3, an arcade system board considered to have the most technically impressive graphics at the time
- April 21 - Apple's Apple Pippin console initially released in Japan (Note: Released in North America on November 4th.)
- June 23 - Nintendo's Nintendo 64, the first true 64-bit home console, initially released in Japan (Note: Release in North America on September 29, 1996 and then in PAL regions on March 1, 1997.)
- July 20 - Nintendo's Game Boy Pocket (GBP) handheld console (30% smaller version of the previous Game Boy handheld console), initially released in Japan (Note: Released in North America on September 2nd.)
- October - Sega's Net Link modem for the Sega Saturn home console
- November 23 – Bandai's Tamagotchi virtual pet handheld initially released in Japan
- December 3 - Namco's Alpine Racer arcade game, including a new type of user interface
- SNK's Neo Geo CDZ (Japan only)

=== Discontinuation ===
1996 saw a major shakeup in the crowded home console market, with the Virtual Boy, Atari Jaguar, 3DO, Sega CD, 32X, and CD-i all being discontinued.

== Top-rated games ==
=== Game of the Year awards ===
The following titles won Game of the Year awards for 1996.

| Awards | Game of the Year | Platform(s) | Publisher | Genre | Ref |
|---|---|---|---|---|---|
| Chicago Tribune | Super Mario 64 | N64 | Nintendo | Platformer | |
| Digitiser | Super Mario 64 | N64 | Nintendo | Platformer | |
| Electronic Gaming Monthly | Super Mario 64 | N64 | Nintendo | Platformer | |
| Game Informer | Super Mario 64 | N64 | Nintendo | Platformer | |
| Golden Joystick Awards | Super Mario 64 | N64 | Nintendo | Platformer | |
| Spotlight Awards | Super Mario 64 | N64 | Nintendo | Platformer | |
| CESA Awards | Sakura Taisen (Sakura Wars) | SAT | Sega | Tactical RPG | |
| GameFan Megawards | Tomb Raider | | Eidos | Action-adventure | |
| GameFan Megawards | Enemy Zero | SAT | Warp | Adventure | |
| Gamest Awards | Street Fighter Zero 2 (Street Fighter Alpha 2) | Arcade | Capcom | Fighting | |
| IAAPA Exhibit Awards | Tokyo Wars | Arcade | Namco | Shooter | |
| VSDA Awards | Donkey Kong Country 2 | SNES | Nintendo | Platformer | |

=== Critically acclaimed titles ===
==== Metacritic and GameRankings ====
Metacritic (MC) and GameRankings (GR) are aggregators of video game journalism reviews.

1996 games and expansions scoring at least 88/100 (MC) or 87.5% (GR)
| Game | Publisher | Release Date | Platform(s) | MC score | GR score |
|---|---|---|---|---|---|
| Super Mario 64 | Nintendo | June 23, 1996 | N64 | 94/100 | 96.41% |
| Wipeout XL/2097 | Psygnosis | September 30, 1996 | PS1 | 93/100 | 94.75% |
| Quake | GT Interactive | June 22, 1996 | DOS | 94/100 | 93.22% |
| Tekken 2 | Namco | March 29, 1996 | PS1 | 89/100 | 92.50% |
| Civilization II | MicroProse | February 29, 1996 | WIN | 94/100 | 91.29% |
| Wave Race 64 | Nintendo | September 27, 1996 | N64 | 92/100 | 90.67% |
| PaRappa the Rapper | Sony Computer Entertainment | December 6, 1996 | PS1 | 92/100 | 88.31% |
| Realms of the Haunting | Interplay | December 31, 1996 | DOS | —N/a | 91.86% |
| Tomb Raider | Eidos Interactive | November 14, 1996 | DOS | —N/a | 91.67% |
| Soul Edge | Namco | December 20, 1996 | PS1 | 89/100 | 91.46% |
| Tomb Raider | Eidos Interactive | October 25, 1996 | PS1 | 91/100 | 90.02% |
| Resident Evil | Capcom | March 22, 1996 | PS1 | 91/100 | 87.23% |
| Command & Conquer: Red Alert | Virgin | November 22, 1996 | DOS | 90/100 | 90.91% |
| Command & Conquer | Sega | December 18, 1996 | SAT | —N/a | 89.90% |
| Dragon Force | Sega | March 29, 1996 | SAT | —N/a | 89.64% |
| International Superstar Soccer 64 | Konami | December 20, 1996 | N64 | —N/a | 89.23% |
| Guardian Heroes | Sega | January 26, 1996 | SAT | —N/a | 89.20% |
| Super Mario RPG | Nintendo | March 9, 1996 | SNES | —N/a | 89.12% |
| Descent II | Interplay Productions | March 13, 1996 | DOS | 89/100 | —N/a |
| Duke Nukem 3D | GT Interactive | January 29, 1996 | DOS | 89/100 | 88.50% |
| Star Control 3 | Accolade | August 31, 1996 | DOS | 89/100 | —N/a |
| NiGHTS into Dreams... | Sega | July 5, 1996 | SAT | —N/a | 88.56% |
| Pokémon Blue Version | Nintendo | October 15, 1996 | GB | —N/a | 88.33% |
| Pokémon Red Version | Nintendo | February 27, 1996 | GB | —N/a | 87.86% |
| Formula 1 | Psygnosis | September 30, 1996 | PS1 | —N/a | 87.75% |
| Fighters Megamix | Sega | December 21, 1996 | SAT | —N/a | 87.67% |
| Pilotwings 64 | Nintendo | June 23, 1996 | N64 | 80/100 | 87.52% |
| Panzer Dragoon II Zwei | Sega | March 22, 1996 | SAT | —N/a | 87.50% |

==== Famitsu Platinum Hall of Fame ====
The following video game releases in 1996 entered Famitsu magazine's "Platinum Hall of Fame" for receiving Famitsu scores of at least 35 out of 40.

| Title | Platform | Developer | Publisher | Genre | Score (out of 40) |
|---|---|---|---|---|---|
| Super Mario 64 | N64 | Nintendo EAD | Nintendo | Platformer | 39 |
| Resident Evil | PS1 | Capcom | Capcom | Survival horror | 38 |
| Tekken 2 | PS1 | Namco | Namco | Fighting | 38 |
| Fighting Vipers | SAT | Sega AM2 | Sega | Fighting | 37 |
| Fushigi no Dungeon: Fūrai no Shiren GB | GB | Aquamarine | Chunsoft | Roguelike | 36 |
| Dragon Quest III: Soshite Densetsu e... | SNES | Heartbeat | Enix | RPG | 36 |
| Panzer Dragoon II Zwei | SAT | Sega | Sega | Rail shooter | 35 |
| J. League Victory Goal '96 | SAT | Sega | Sega | Sports | 35 |
| Fighters Megamix | SAT | Sega AM2 | Sega | Fighting | 35 |

== Financial performance ==
=== Highest-grossing arcade games ===
==== Japan ====
In Japan, the following titles were the highest-grossing arcade games of 1996.

| Rank | Gamest | | Game Machine | | |
| Rank | Title | Manufacturer | Title | Type | Points |
|---|---|---|---|---|---|
| 1 | Street Fighter Zero 2 (Street Fighter Alpha 2) | Capcom | Virtua Fighter 2 / 2.1 | PCB | 5541 |
| 2 | Virtual On: Cyber Troopers | Sega | Puzzle Bobble 2 / 2X | PCB | 4782 |
| 3 | The King of Fighters '96 | SNK | Print Club (Purikura) | Other | 4059 |
| 4 | Virtua Fighter 3 | Sega | Rave Racer | SD / DX / 2P | 3780 |
| 5 | Dungeons & Dragons: Shadow over Mystara | Capcom | Tekken 2 | PCB | 3579 |
| 6 | Psychic Force | Taito | Virtua Cop 2 | Dedicated | 3271 |
| 7 | RayStorm | Taito | Virtual On: Cyber Troopers | Dedicated | 3208 |
| 8 | X-Men vs. Street Fighter | Capcom | Alpine Racer | Dedicated | 2807 |
| 9 | Real Bout Garō Densetsu (Real Bout Fatal Fury) | SNK | Fighting Vipers | PCB | 2555 |
| 10 | Battle Garegga | Eighting | Street Fighter Zero 2 | PCB | 2543 |

==== United States ====
In the United States, the following titles were the highest-grossing arcade video games of 1996.

| Drasnin Communications | | | | AMOA | |
| Title | Developer | Manufacturer | Genre | Dedicated cabinet | Conversion kit |
|---|---|---|---|---|---|
| Daytona USA | Sega AM2 | Sega | Racing | Alpine Racer | Area 51 |
| Cruis'n USA | Midway Games | Midway Games | Racing | Area 51 | Bust-A-Move Again |
| Tekken 2 | Namco | Namco | Fighting | Cruis'n USA | Mortal Kombat 3 |
| Area 51 | Mesa Logic | Atari Games | Light gun shooter | Daytona USA | Soul Edge |
| Alpine Racer | Namco | Namco | Sports | Time Crisis | Tekken 2 |
| Die Hard Arcade | Sega AM1 | Sega | Brawler | —N/a | |
| Metal Slug | SNK | SNK | Run and gun | —N/a | |
| Point Blank | Namco | Namco | Light gun shooter | —N/a | |
| DecAthlete | Sega AM3 | Sega | Sports | —N/a | |
| Strikers 1945 | Psikyo | Psikyo | Scrolling shooter | —N/a | |

==== Australia ====
On Australia's Timezone monthly arcade charts published in the March 1996 issue of Leisure Line magazine, Sega's Manx TT Super Bike was the top-grossing dedicated arcade cabinet and Namco's Point Blank was the top-grossing arcade conversion kit.

=== Best-selling video game consoles ===
| Rank | Manufacturer | Game console | Type | Generation | Sales | | |
| Rank | Manufacturer | Game console | Type | Generation | Japan | United States | Worldwide |
|---|---|---|---|---|---|---|---|
| 1 | Sony | PS1 | Home | 32-bit | 2,200,000+ | 2,044,000 | 6,600,000+ |
| 2 | Nintendo | GB | Handheld | 8-bit | 2,860,000 | Unknown | 4,000,000+ |
| 2 | Sega | SAT | Home | 32-bit | 2,300,000 | 744,000 | 4,000,000+ |
| 4 | Nintendo | N64 | Home | 64-bit | 1,022,999 | 1,736,000 | 2,758,999+ |
| 5 | Nintendo | SNES | Home | 16-bit | 620,000 | 1,416,000 | 1,746,000+ |
| 6 | Sega | GEN | Home | 16-bit | Unknown | 1,316,000 | 1,316,000+ |
| 7 | Nintendo | NES | Home | 8-bit | 70,000 | 468,000 | 538,000+ |
| 8 | Sega | GG | Handheld | 8-bit | 100,000 | Unknown | 100,000+ |
| 9 | NEC | PCFX | Home | 32-bit | 50,000 | Unknown | 50,000+ |
| 9 | Panasonic | 3DO | Home | 32-bit | 50,000 | Unknown | 50,000+ |

=== Best-selling home video games ===
The following titles were the top ten best-selling home video games (console games or computer games) worldwide in 1996.

| Rank | Title | Platform | Sales | | | |
| Rank | Title | Platform | Japan | United States | Europe | Worldwide |
|---|---|---|---|---|---|---|
| 1 | Super Mario 64 | N64 | 903,000 | 2,000,000+ | —N/a | 2,903,000+ |
| 2 | Tekken 2 | PS1 | 1,200,000+ | 1,000,000+ | 420,000 | 2,620,000+ |
| 3 | Resident Evil (Biohazard) | PS1 | 1,016,000 | 1,000,000+ | 300,000+ | 2,316,000+ |
| 4 | Super Mario RPG | SNES | 995,898 | 1,000,000+ | —N/a | 1,995,898+ |
| 5 | Donkey Kong Country 3 | SNES | 674,000 | 1,000,000+ | Unknown | 1,674,000+ |
| 6 | Pocket Monsters: Red / Green / Blue | GB | 1,663,861 | —N/a | —N/a | 1,663,861 |
| 7 | Donkey Kong Country 2 | SNES | 612,000 | 1,000,000+ | Unknown | 1,612,000+ |
| 8 | Wave Race 64 | N64 | 154,682 | 1,000,000+ | —N/a | 1,154,682+ |
| 9 | Dragon Quest III: Soshite Densetsu e... | SNES | 1,071,000 | —N/a | —N/a | 1,071,000 |
| 10 | Madden NFL 97 | PS1 | —N/a | 1,000,000+ | Unknown | 1,000,000+ |

==== Japan ====
In Japan, the following titles were the top ten best-selling home video games of 1996.

| Rank | Title | Platform | Developer | Publisher | Genre | Sales | Ref |
|---|---|---|---|---|---|---|---|
| 1 | Pocket Monsters: Red / Green / Blue | GB | Game Freak | Nintendo | RPG | 1,663,861 | |
| 2 | Tekken 2 | PS1 | Namco | Namco | Fighting | 1,200,000+ | |
| 3 | Dragon Quest III: Soshite Densetsu e... | SNES | Heartbeat | Enix | RPG | 1,071,000 | |
| 4 | Biohazard (Resident Evil) | PS1 | Capcom | Capcom | Survival horror | 1,016,000 | |
| 5 | Super Mario RPG | SNES | Squaresoft | Nintendo | RPG | 995,898 | |
| 6 | Derby Stallion '96 | PS1 | ASCII | ASCII | Simulation | 960,000 | |
| 7 | Super Mario 64 | N64 | Nintendo EAD | Nintendo | Platformer | 903,000 | |
| 8 | Arc the Lad II | PS1 | ARC Entertainment | Sony | RPG | 818,000 | |
| 9 | Tobal No. 1 | PS1 | DreamFactory | Squaresoft | Fighting | 752,000 | |
| 10 | Rage Racer | PS1 | Namco | Namco | Racing | 701,000 | |

==== United States ====
In the United States, the following titles were the top ten best-selling home video games of 1996.

| Rank | Title | Platform | Publisher | Genre | Sales | Revenue | Inflation |
|---|---|---|---|---|---|---|---|
| 1 | Super Mario 64 | N64 | Nintendo | Platformer | 2,000,000+ | $140,000,000 | $287,000,000 |
| 2 | Donkey Kong Country 2 | SNES | Nintendo | Platformer | 1,000,000+ | Unknown | Unknown |
| 3 | Donkey Kong Country 3 | SNES | Nintendo | Platformer | 1,000,000+ | Unknown | Unknown |
| 4 | Madden NFL 97 | PS1 | EA Sports | Sports (football) | 1,000,000+ | Unknown | Unknown |
| 5 | Wave Race 64 | N64 | Nintendo | Racing | 1,000,000+ | Unknown | Unknown |
| 6 | Super Mario RPG | SNES | Nintendo | RPG | 1,000,000+ | Unknown | Unknown |
| 7 | Tekken 2 | PS1 | Namco | Fighting | 1,000,000+ | Unknown | Unknown |
| 8 | Star Wars: Shadows of the Empire | N64 | Nintendo | Action | 1,000,000+ | Unknown | Unknown |
| 9 | Resident Evil | PS1 | Capcom | Survival horror | 1,000,000+ | Unknown | Unknown |
| 10 | Myst | PS1 | Broderbund | Adventure | 853,765 | $28,800,000 | $59,100,000 |

==== Europe ====
In Europe, the following titles were the best-selling home video games of 1996.

| Rank | All platforms | | PlayStation | | | |
| Rank | Title | Publisher | Title | EU sales | UK revenue | UK revenue (inflation) |
|---|---|---|---|---|---|---|
| 1 | Formula 1 | Psygnosis | Formula 1 | 420,000+ | £15,000,000+ ($23,000,000+) | $47,000,000+ |
| 2 | Unknown | | Tekken 2 | 420,000 | £15,000,000+ ($23,000,000+) | $47,000,000+ |
| 3 | Unknown | | FIFA 97 | 300,000+ | Unknown | Unknown |
| 4 | Unknown | | Resident Evil | 300,000+ | Unknown | Unknown |
| 5 | Unknown | | Crash Bandicoot | 300,000 | £15,000,000+ ($23,000,000+) | $47,000,000+ |
| 6 | Unknown | | Destruction Derby | Unknown | | |
| 7 | Unknown | | Ridge Racer Revolution | Unknown | | |
| 8 | Unknown | | Tekken | Unknown | | |
| 9 | Unknown | | Ridge Racer | Unknown | | |
| 10 | Unknown | | Tomb Raider | Unknown | | |

In addition to the PlayStation games listed above, the following titles were the year's best-selling Sega Saturn and PC games in the United Kingdom.

| Sega Saturn | | PC | |
| HMV | | Rank | Title |
|---|---|---|---|
| Athlete Kings | Tomb Raider | 1 | Grand Prix 2 |
| Bust-A-Move 2 | Ultimate Mortal Kombat 3 | 2 | Command & Conquer: Red Alert |
| Daytona USA: Circuit Edition | Virtua Cop | 3 | FIFA 97 |
| Euro 96 | Virtua Fighter 2 | 4 | Command & Conquer |
| Exhumed | Sega Worldwide Soccer 97 | 5 | Civilization II |
| Fighting Vipers | —N/a | 6 | Quake |
| Guardian Heroes | —N/a | 7 | Theme Park |
| Nights into Dreams | —N/a | 8 | Rally Championship |
| Sea Bass Fishing | —N/a | 9 | Championship Manager 2 |
| Sega Rally Championship | —N/a | 10 | Worms |

=== Top game rentals in the United States ===
In the United States, the following games were the top video game rentals of each month, according to the Video Software Dealers Association (VSDA).

| Month | Game | Ref |
|---|---|---|
| January | Unknown | |
| February | Unknown | |
| March | Unknown | |
| April | Unknown | |
| May | Super Mario RPG | |
| June | Super Mario RPG | |
| July | Super Mario RPG | |
| August | Super Mario RPG | |
| September | Unknown | |
| October | Unknown | |
| November | Unknown | |
| December | Unknown | |

== Events ==
- March – Swedish video game magazine "Super Power" changes name to Super Play.
- 15 July – Tom Kalinske announces he will leave his position as president for Sega of America on 1 October.
- May 16–18 – The second annual E3 is held in Los Angeles, California, United States.
- 7 September - Sega opens SegaWorld London as part of the London Trocadero in England. It is the first Sega World park to open outside of Japan.
- 1 October – Tom Kalinske resigns as president for Sega of America.
- December 31 – Battle.net Classic is released.

=== Business ===
- February – Blizzard Entertainment acquires a development group known as Condor, renaming it Blizzard North
- April – Eidos Interactive acquires CentreGold plc, which holds Core Design (creator of the Lara Croft character) and U.S. Gold
- May 1 – GameSpot and GameFAQs are launched
- June – Firaxis Games is formed By Jeff Briggs with Sid Meier and Brian Reynolds
- July – GT Interactive purchases Humongous Entertainment
- July 24 – CUC International, Inc purchases Sierra On-Line, Blizzard Entertainment and Davidson & Associates for about $3 billion in a stock swap.
- July 30 - Atari Corporation reverse-merges with JTS, Inc.
- August 6 – AOL buys Sierra's ImagiNation Network from AT&T for a reported $15 million.
- August 24 – Valve is founded.
- September 1 – AOL closes ImagiNation Network, the first online video game with graphics, after 5 years of service.
- September 29 – IGN is founded.
- November 13 – Tom Clancy and Virtus Corp. found Red Storm Entertainment, headed by Doug Littlejohns
- Infogrames Entertainment SA acquires Ocean Software Ltd.
- Midway Games, Inc. (subsidiary of WMS Industries) acquires Atari Games Corporation from Time Warner.
- Technos Japan Corporation, originator of the Nekketsu Kouha Kunio Kun series and Double Dragon series, goes out of business (assets acquired by Atlus)
- Black Isle Studios forms as a division by Interplay; doesn't use Black Isle name until 1998
- Game Park Inc. founded in South Korea
- The company formed by MicroProse and Spectrum HoloByte in 1993 starts branding using only the MicroProse name
- Overworks, Ltd. formed
- Zed Two Limited formed
- Nintendo of America, Inc. v. Computer & Entertainment, Inc.
- The 3DO Company purchases New World Computing

== Notable releases ==
| Release Date | Title | Developer/Publisher | Platform | Genre | Ref |
|---|---|---|---|---|---|
| January 25 | Guardian Heroes | Treasure/Sega | SAT | Brawler | |
| January 26 | Mystaria: The Realms of Lore | Micro Cabin/Sega | SAT | Tactical RPG | |
| January 26 | Shizuku | Leaf | PC98 | Visual novel | |
| January 29 | Duke Nukem 3D | 3D Realms/GT Interactive | DOS | FPS | |
| January 31 | Mega Man X3 | Capcom | SNES | | |
| February 9 | Bahamut Lagoon | SquareSoft | SNES | Tactical RPG | |
| February 20 | Soul Edge | Namco | Arcade | Fighting | |
| February 23 | Front Mission: Gun Hazard | SquareSoft | SNES | | |
| February 27 | Pokémon Red and Green | Game Freak/Nintendo | GB | | |
| February 29 | Civilization II | MicroProse | WIN | 4X | |
| February 29 | Ripper | Take Two Interactive | DOS | Adventure, Interactive film | |
| February 29 | Rise 2: Resurrection | Mirage/Acclaim | WIN, SAT, PS1 | | |
| February 29 | Terra Nova: Strike Force Centauri | Looking Glass Studios | DOS | FPS | |
| February 29 | Zork: Nemesis | Activision | WIN | | |
| March 9 | Super Mario RPG | SquareSoft/Nintendo | SNES | RPG | |
| March 21 | Kirby Super Star | HAL Labs/Nintendo | SNES | | |
| March 22 | Resident Evil | Capcom | PS1 | survival horror | |
| March 22 | Panzer Dragoon II Zwei | Team Andromeda/Sega | SAT | Rail shooter | |
| March 24 | Someone's in the Kitchen! | The Neverhood Inc./DreamWorks | WIN | | |
| March 29 | Dragon Ball Z: Hyper Dimension | TOSE/Bandai | SNES | | |
| April 20 | Barbie Fashion Designer | Digital Domain/Mattel Media | WIN | | |
| April 26 | Jumping Flash! 2 | Exact/SCEA | PS1 | Platformer | |
| April 26 | The Legend of Oasis | Sega/Ancient | SAT | | |
| April 30 | Indiana Jones and His Desktop Adventures | LucasArts | WIN, MAC | Adventure | |
| May 14 | Fire Emblem: Seisen no Keifu | Intelligent Systems/Nintendo | SNES | Tactical RPG | |
| May 13 | Kirby's Block Ball | HAL Labs/Nintendo | GB | | |
| May 24 | Metal Slug | SNK | NEO | | |
| May 31 | Final Doom | id Software | DOS | | |
| June | Last Bronx | Sega | Arcade | | |
| June 22 | Quake | id Software | DOS | | |
| June 23 | Super Mario 64 | Nintendo | N64 | Platformer | |
| June 26 | Ultimate Mortal Kombat 3 | Acclaim Entertainment, GT Interactive, Midway, Williams Entertainment | SAT, GEN, SNES | | |
| July 5 | NiGHTS into Dreams... | Sega | SAT | | |
| July 19 | Saturn Bomberman | Hudson | SAT | | |
| July 19 | Star Ocean | tri-ace/Enix | SNES | | |
| July 25 | The King of Fighters '96 | SNK | NEO, NEOCD, SAT | | |
| July 26 | Bust-A-Move 2: Arcade Edition | Taito/Acclaim | SAT, PS1 | Puzzle | |
| July 31 | Phantasmagoria: A Puzzle of Flesh | Sierra On-Line | DOS, WIN | | |
| July 31 | Virtua Fighter Kids | Sega AM2 | SAT, Arcade | | |
| August 25 | Tekken 2 | Namco | PS1 | Fighting | |
| August 26 | Azrael's Tear | Intelligent Games | DOS | Adventure | |
| August 31 | Die Hard Trilogy | Probe Entertainment/Fox Interactive | WIN, PS1, SAT | | |
| August 31 | Tetris Attack | Intelligent Systems/Nintendo | SNES, GB | | |
| August 31 | Madden NFL 97 | EA Sports/Electronic Arts | GEN, PS1, WIN, SNES, SAT, GB | Sports (football) | |
| August 31 | Beyond the Beyond | Camelot/SCEA | PS1 | RPG | |
| August 31 | Jet Moto | SingleTrac/SCEA | PS1 | Racing | |
| September | Jagged Alliance: Deadly Games | Sir-Tech | DOS | | |
| September | Virtua Fighter 3 | Sega AM2 | Arcade | Fighting | |
| September 8 | Magic Carpet 2 | Bullfrog Productions | DOS | Action | |
| September 9 | Crash Bandicoot | Naughty Dog/Universal/Sony | PS1 | | |
| September 14 | GunGriffon | Game Arts/Sega | SAT | | |
| September 20 | Revelations: Persona | Atlus | PS1 | RPG | |
| September 20 | The Elder Scrolls II: Daggerfall | Bethesda Softworks | WIN | Sandbox | |
| September 27 | Meridian 59 | 3DO | WIN | MMORPG | |
| September 27 | Blue Breaker: Ken yori mo hohoemi o | HuneX | PCFX | RPG | |
| September 29 | Pilotwings 64 | Nintendo | N64 | | |
| September 30 | Broken Sword: The Shadow of the Templars | Revolution Software/Virgin Interactive | WIN, PS1 | Adventure | |
| September 30 | Wipeout XL/2097 | Psygnosis | PS1 | | |
| September 30 | Shattered Steel | BioWare/Interplay | DOS | | |
| September 30 | Street Fighter Alpha 2 | Capcom | Arcade, SNES, PS1, SAT | | |
| September 30 | Mr. Bones | Zono/Sega | SAT | Platformer | |
| September 30 | Tobal No. 1 | DreamFactory/SCEA | PS1 | Fighting | |
| September 30 | Formula 1 | Bizarre Creations/SCEA | PS1 | Racing | |
| September 30 | Donkey Kong Land 2 | Rare/Nintendo | GB | | |
| October 1 | Heroes of Might and Magic II: The Succession Wars | New World Computing/3DO | DOS, WIN | | |
| October 10 | Mortal Kombat Trilogy | Avalanche, Midway, Point of View | N64, PS1, RZ | | |
| October 15 | Marathon Infinity | Bungie | MAC | | |
| October 15 | Pokémon Blue | Game Freak/Nintendo | GB | | |
| October 30 | The Neverhood | The Neverhood Inc./DreamWorks | WIN | | |
| October 31 | Command & Conquer: Red Alert | Westwood Studios | DOS | | |
| October 31 | Master of Orion II | Simtex/MicroProse | DOS | | |
| October 31 | Toonstruck | Burst Studios/Virgin Interactive Entertainment | DOS | | |
| October 31 | Drowned God | Epic Multimedia Group/Inscape | WIN | Adventure | |
| October 31 | SimCopter | Maxis | WIN | Simulation (flight) | |
| October 31 | King's Field III | FromSoftware/ASCII Entertainment | PS1 | | |
| October 31 | DeathDrome | Zipper Interactive/Viacom | WIN | | |
| October 31 | WWF In Your House | Acclaim | DOS, PS1, SAT | | |
| October 31 | Twisted Metal 2 | SingleTrac/SCEA | PS1 | | |
| October 31 | Destruction Derby 2 | Reflections Interactive/SCEA | PS1 | | |
| October 31 | NBA Live 97 | Electronic Arts, EA Sports | PS1, SAT, SNES, GEN | | |
| October 31 | Pandemonium! | Electronic Arts, EA Sports | PS1, SAT | | |
| November 1 | Blood Omen: Legacy of Kain | Silicon Knights/Crystal Dynamics | PS1, WIN | | |
| November 7 | Sonic 3D Blast | Sega/Traveller's Tales | SAT, GEN | Platformer | |
| November 7 | Vectorman 2 | Sega/BlueSky Software | GEN | Platformer | |
| November 14 | Tomb Raider | Core Design/Eidos | PS1, SAT, DOS | Action-adventure | |
| November 18 | Donkey Kong Country 3: Dixie Kong's Double Trouble! | Rare/Nintendo | SNES | | |
| November 20 | Disruptor | Insomniac Games | PS1 | | |
| November 25 | Killer Instinct Gold | Rare/Nintendo | N64 | Fighting | |
| November 25 | Bubsy is 3D in "Furbitten Planet" | Eidetic/Accolade | PS1 | | |
| November 26 | Area 51 | Mesa Logic/Atari Games | PS1, WIN, SAT | Shooter | |
| November 26 | Dead or Alive | Team Ninja/Tecmo | Arcade | Fighting | |
| November 30 | Contra: Legacy of War | Konami/Appaloosa Interactive | SAT, PS1 | | |
| November 30 | Dragon Force | Sega/Working Designs | SAT | RPG, RTS | |
| November 30 | Fighting Vipers | Sega AM2 | SAT, Arcade | Fighting | |
| November 30 | Virtua Cop 2 | Sega AM2 | SAT, Arcade | Light gun shooter | |
| November 30 | Virtual On: Cyber Troopers | CRI/Sega | SAT, Arcade | | |
| November 30 | Bug Too! | Sega/Realtime Associates | SAT, WIN | | |
| November 30 | FIFA Soccer 97 | EA Canada/Electronic Arts | GEN, PS1, WIN, SNES, SAT, GB | | |
| December 3 | Star Wars: Shadows of the Empire | LucasArts/Nintendo | N64 | Action | |
| December 12 | Ignition | Unique Development Studios/Virgin Interactive | DOS, WIN | Racing | |
| December 14 | Mario Kart 64 | Nintendo | N64 | Racing (kart) | |
| December 16 | Furcadia | Dragon's Eye Productions, Inc. | WIN | MMORPG | |
| December 17 | Mega Man 8 | Capcom | PS1 | | |
| December 26 | Yu-no | ELF Corporation | PC98 | Visual novel | |
| December 31 | Death Rally | Remedy Entertainment/GT Interactive | DOS | | |
| December 31 | NBA Hangtime | Midway | GEN, PS1, WIN, N64, Arcade, SNES | Sports (basketball) | |

== See also ==
- 1996 in games
