= Creepy Castle =

2016 video game

- Developer: Dopterra
- Publisher: Nicalis
- Composers: Marius Schneider; RushJet1; Zachariah Lazarus
- Engine: GameMaker
- Platform: Windows
- Release: WW: October 31, 2016
- Genre: Role-playing
- Mode: Single-player

Creepy Castle is a 2016 side-scrolling role-playing video game created by Alaskan developer Dopterra. It was released on October 31, 2016, for Microsoft Windows through Steam. The game received positive reviews.

== Gameplay ==
Creepy Castle is a side-scrolling role-playing game where the player controls Moth, an anthropomorphic insect adventurer. The game is composed of a number of separate story campaigns, each of which spans multiple hours and has unique content and gameplay mechanics.

Visually, Creepy Castle resembles both NES games and earlier Atari titles. A number of built-in filters are included, allowing the game to appear as if it is running on a Game Boy or a CRT television among others. Mechanically, Creepy Castle sees the player navigating a large, multi-layered complex while collecting healing items and defeating enemies. Some areas of the map require special items to traverse, giving the game a key Metroidvania quality. Combat is turn-based and is accomplished through a number of different minigames that require the player to constantly adapt to new rule sets.

== Development ==
Development of Creepy Castle was financed through a crowdfunding campaign on the website Kickstarter. The campaign was launched on September 4, 2014, with a goal of US$6,000; it ended on October 4, 2014, with US$8,485 raised by 271 people (141.42% of the original goal).

== Reception ==
Reception

Aggregate score
Aggregator	Score
Metacritic	82/100

Review score
Publication	Score
Hardcore Gamer	3.5/5

Creepy Castle was met with positive reception. The game received an average score of 82/100 from six reviews on Metacritic, indicating "generally favorable reviews". In a more lukewarm review, Jordan Helm of Hardcore Gamer wrote, "Though not quite matching the Everest-high peak of its contemporaries, Creepy Castle delivers enough charm and quirkiness to leave a satisfying impression."
