= 198X =

2019 action video game

- Developer: Hi-Bit Studios
- Publisher: Sonka
- Platforms: PlayStation 4 Windows; Nintendo Switch; Xbox One
- Release: PS4: NA: June 16, 2019; EU: June 20, 2019; Windows; June 20, 2019; Switch; January 23, 2020; Xbox One; TBA
- Genre: Action
- Mode: Single-player

198X is an action game developed by the Swedish team Hi-Bit Studios and published by Sonka. It was released for PlayStation 4 and Windows in June 2019, with a port for the Nintendo Switch published in January 2020. An Xbox One version was announced but never released. A homage to arcade gaming in the 1980s, 198X's coming-of-age story follows an unnamed "Kid" as they discover a video arcade in an abandoned factory and fall in love with video gaming. Each of the five chapters is based around a video game genre such as beat 'em ups and horizontally scrolling shooters. The game received positive reviews, with praise for its gameplay and criticism of its short length.

== Plot ==
In an introductory sequence entitled Beating Heart that plays like a side-scrolling beat 'em up, the teenage protagonist fights their way from the subway station and through the streets of the unnamed city in which they live until they reach a hospital where they are attacked by a hooded figure with glowing red eyes.

Set in the 1980s, the game follows the Kid, the teenager from the introduction, who feels stuck in their childhood home in "sleepy suburbia" as they wait for their life to "move forward". One night, as the Kid wanders the streets of their unnamed city looking for anything to "make my heart skip a beat again", they stumble across an abandoned factory that was built "long before" the protagonist was born and now houses an arcade. Wondering if they found a place where they can fit in, they start playing a horizontally scrolling space shooter entitled Out of the Void. Feeling disconnected at school, the Kid's mind frequently returns to the arcade where they were "on an asteroid somewhere fighting Space Invaders." The only person they notice in school is "her", a "punk rocker from the south district" whose freedom the Kid admires. The story then cuts to the Kid playing an arcade racing game entitled The Runaway. During The Runaway's second stage, the Kid explains that they've started to spend every night at the arcade, where every game they master makes them "stronger" and "more confident". One evening, the Kid reminisces about their childhood and how "anything was possible" back then before "everyone got brainwashed" in high school. They then mention how, as a kid, "shadows seem darker and more terrifying" yet "more exciting" at the same time. The game then transitions to a ninja video game called Shadowplay. That night, while walking to the arcade, the Kid reveals that their parents split up due to an incident involving the Kid's father.

They also mention that night was when "everything changed" at the arcade before 198X transitions into a role-playing video game entitled Kill Screen where the player has to defeat 3 dragons to solve a maze before fighting the unwinnable SHODAN-like final boss. Afterwards, the Kid is seen sitting outside the arcade in the rain, mentioning that everything "was still there" but that "nothing was the same". Characters from 198X's various games begin to materialize around the Kid, who states that the "game was not over".

== Development ==
A KickStarter page for 198X was launched on May 3, 2018, With the developer Hi-Bit Studios seeking SEK 500,000 for the project. The goal was reached a little under a month later on June 2 with 1,920 backers pledging SEK 676,558.

== Reception ==
Reception

Aggregate scores
Aggregator	Score
Metacritic	(PS4) 74/100 (PC) 63/100 (NS) 65/100
OpenCritic	53% recommend

Review scores
Publication	Score
Game Informer	7/10
GameSpot	5/10
Nintendo Life	8/10
Nintendo World Report	9/10

The PlayStation 4, PC, and Nintendo Switch versions of 198X all received "mixed or average" reviews from critics, according to the review aggregation website Metacritic. Fellow review aggregator OpenCritic assessed that the game received fair approval, being recommended by 53% of critics. Writing for Nintendo Life, Damien McFerren gave the game 8/10 stars, stating that while 198X had an "exceptional" soundtrack and cited Out of the Void as "perhaps the highlight of the entire game", he found the game to be too short, with McFerren able to breeze through the entirety of 198X in "around an hour". He also bemoaned the lack of replayability in the mini-games, which he found little point in returning to "outside of boosting your high score".

In his review for GameSpot, James O'Connor gave 198X 5/10 stars, calling the game "mediocre" and stating that while the soundtrack "does a great job of evoking the arcade classics it is paying homage to" and calling Shadowplay "great" he ultimately concluded that 198X was a "great idea with middling execution" and that there's "not enough here for the game to feel like a proper ode to '80s arcades" and that "the Kid's plight, and his longing to escape his current life" don't "totally connect". He finished the review by saying, "198X feels more like a proof of concept than a final product." Eurogamer's Martin Robinson stated that he was "cynical" going into 198X due to seeing many other games like it before but praised its style and the "pitch perfect pastiches" of classic arcade games, which he called "the most assured part of the whole package".

Robinson, however, wasn't convinced by the story, chalking up his issues with it to either 198X being the first game in a planned series that just found its feet at the end of the first title or the narrator whom he found to "sound both bored and melodramatic at once". He concluded the review by stating the developer Hi-Bit Studios did "Fine work here" while stating that 198X is "nestled between near meticulous versions of key inspirations such as Ninja Warriors, OutRun, Gradius, and R-Type and stated that "there's no greater compliment than to say that the tributes on offer here sit happily alongside the originals".

Joe Juba of Game Informer concluded: "198X reminds players that even simple arcade experiences (or their recreations) can provide an interesting escape." Jordan Rudek of Nintendo World Report added: "Rather than a fun, traditional game experience, it's best viewed as a bold and thought-provoking work that reminds us of a time before wireless controllers and console wars."
