= NightSky =

2011 video game

- Developer: Nifflas
- Publisher: Nicalis
- Platforms: Windows, MacOS, Linux, Nintendo 3DS, iOS
- Release: March 1, 2011 (Windows); September 1, 2012 (MacOS, Linux); October 25, 2012 (3DS eShop); March 14, 2013 (iOS)
- Genre: Puzzle-platformer
- Mode: Single-player

NightSky is an indie puzzle-platformer video game developed by Nifflas and published by Nicalis. It was released on March 1, 2011 for Windows, followed by a September 1, 2012 release for MacOS and Linux, an October 25, 2012 release for the Nintendo 3DS eShop, and a March 14, 2013 release on iOS. The game largely consists of silhouette graphics, and the player controls a sphere to advance, using realistic physics to navigate each area. The game was positively received by critics, who praised its graphics and music, but were more mixed on the design of its gameplay.

== Reception ==
Philip J. Reed of Nintendo Life gave the game's 3DS version a perfect score, calling it an "absolutely brilliant experience" with a "well-managed learning curve". Mike Rose of Pocket Gamer was also positive on the game, describing it as elegant but with a hardcore level of difficulty. Edge magazine, however, rated the game more poorly, calling it "accomplished and inventive" but overall uninteresting and "missing its heart".
