= Nintendomagasinet =

Former Swedish video game magazine

- editor in chief: Gunnar Lindberg
- Staff writers: Tobias Bjarneby
- Frequency: 10 issues each year
- Publisher: Atlantic förlag
- First issue: August 1990; 36 years ago
- Final issue: July 1994
- Country: Sweden
- Based in: Bromma
- Language: Swedish
- ISSN: 1101-5209

Nintendomagasinet (Swedish: The Nintendo Magazine) was a Swedish video game magazine, published between the years of 1990 and 1994. The magazine contained game news, reports from fairs and expos, game guides, editorials, video game-related comics, and the subscriber-only "Power Player" supplement containing game reviews. The comics were translations of the Nintendo Comics System comics, and later the Nintendo Power comics Super Mario Adventures and The Legend of Zelda.
