= Robert Stickgold =

American sleep researcher (born 1945)

Dr. Robert A. Stickgold
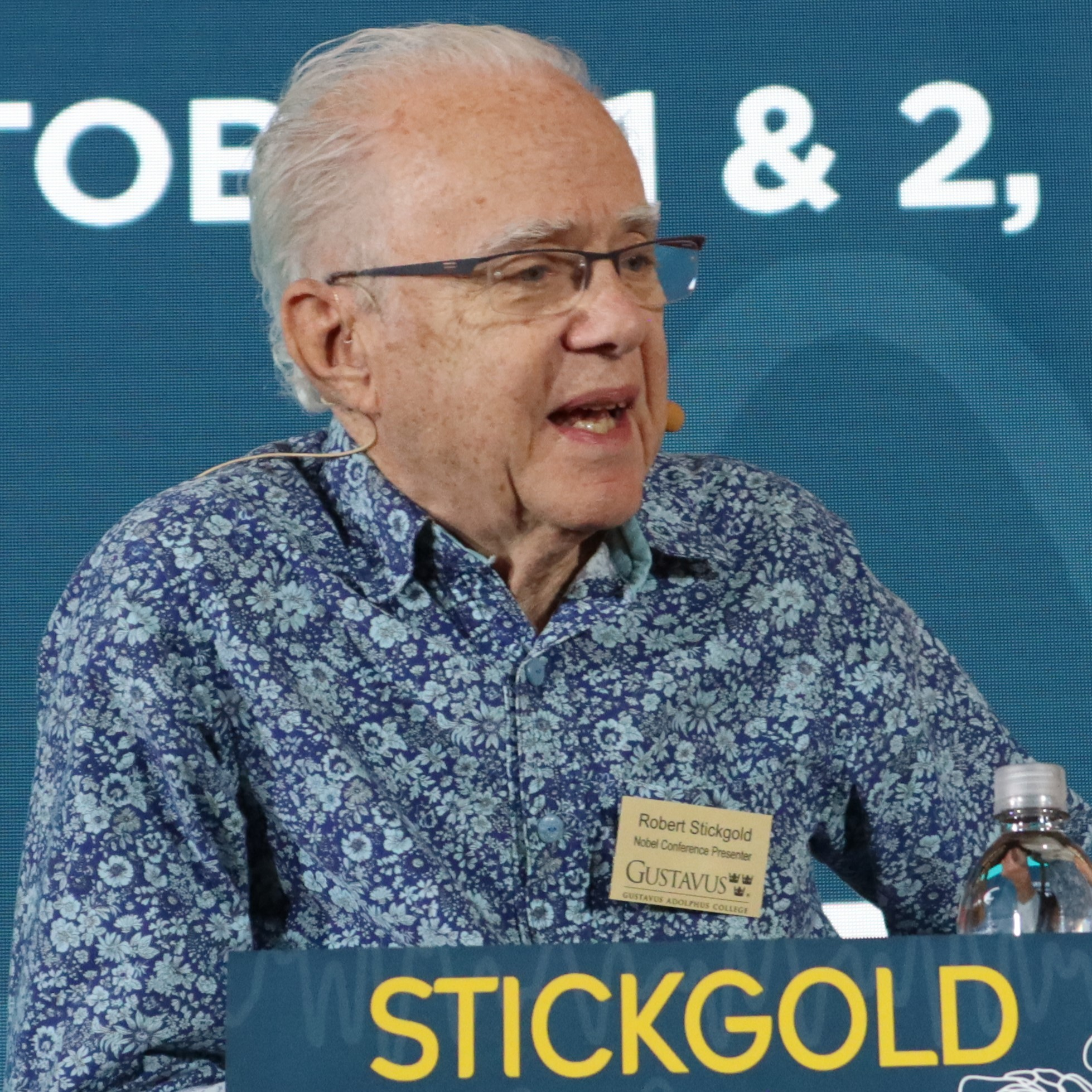
- Robert Stickgold in 2024
- Born: 24 October 1945 (age 80); Chicago, Illinois, U.S.
- Occupation: Professor of Psychiatry
- Employer: Harvard Medical School (Division of Sleep Medicine)

Robert Stickgold is a professor of psychiatry at the Harvard Medical School and the Beth Israel Deaconess Medical Center. A sleep researcher, his work focuses on the relationship between sleep and learning. Stickgold's articles in the popular press are intended to illustrate the dangers of sleep deprivation.

Stickgold was born in Chicago. He graduated from Harvard University before attending the University of Wisconsin–Madison, where he received his doctorate in biochemistry. He worked with the sleep researcher J. Allan Hobson for many years and has been known to quote Hobson's quip: "The only known function of sleep is to cure sleepiness". Stickgold's research has focused on sleep and cognition, dreaming, and conscious states. He has been a proponent of the role of sleep in memory consolidation. Additional research has focused on dreaming. In one experiment, participants played the computer game Tetris for three days and reported dreaming about falling geometric shapes—a phenomenon now known as the Tetris effect. Even patients with anterograde amnesia, who did not remember playing the game, had similar dreams as normal participants. Similar results were found in another study utilizing the video game Alpine Racer 2. Participants reported dreaming about skiing.

Stickgold lives in Cambridge, Massachusetts and has four children.

Stickgold is also a published science fiction author. In 1973, he had his novelette "Susies Reality" published in the May/June issue of "Worlds of IF Science Fiction" anthology magazine. With Mark Noble, he wrote "Gloryhits" in 1978. In 1981, he published "The California Coven Project".
