= Cave Story =

2004 video game

- Opening cinematic depicting (from left) Balrog, the Doctor, and Misery
- Developer: Studio Pixel (Note: Wii, DSi, 3DS versions of the game, Cave Story 3D, and Cave Story+ co-developed by Nicalis)
- Publishers: Studio Pixel; Nicalis (Wii, DSi, Cave Story+); NIS America (Cave Story 3D)
- Designer: Daisuke Amaya
- Writer: Daisuke Amaya
- Composers: Daisuke Amaya; Wii, Cave Story+; Yann van der Cruyssen; Nicklas Nygren; 3D, Cave Story+; Danny Baranowsky; Dustin Kulwicki; Cave Story+; Tadd Nuznov; Ridiculon
- Platforms: Microsoft Windows; Wii; Nintendo DSi; Nintendo 3DS; macOS; Linux; Nintendo Switch
- Release: December 20, 2004: Microsoft Windows; JP: 20 December 2004 Cave Story+; WW: 22 November 2011 Wii; NA: 22 March 2010; EU: 10 December 2010 Nintendo DSi; NA: 29 November 2010; JP: 22 November 2011 Nintendo 3DS; NA: 4 October 2012; EU: 1 May 2014; JP: 30 September 2015 Cave Story 3D; NA: 8 November 2011; EU: 11 November 2011; AU: 24 November 2011; JP: 26 July 2012 Linux; WW: 13 December 2011 Nintendo Switch; NA: 20 June 2017; PAL: 20 July 2017; JP: 8 February 2018
- Genre: Metroidvania
- Modes: Single-player, multiplayer

Cave Story (Note: Originally released in Japan as Dōkutsu Monogatari (洞窟物語)) is a 2004 Metroidvania game developed by Daisuke "Pixel" Amaya. It was released on December 20, 2004 for Microsoft Windows. The game revolves around Quote, a robot who wakes up suffering from amnesia and explores in diverse cavernous areas in order to uncover his backstory and escape from the cave. The character gains access to new areas as he powers up his weapons by collecting triangular experience crystals and solves various platforming puzzles. Quote speaks to non-player characters scattered around the game world in order to learn more about the world and its inhabitants. Cave Story features 2D platform mechanics and is reminiscent of the games Amaya played in his youth, such as Metroid and Castlevania.

After its initial self-published release, the game slowly gained popularity on the Internet. It received widespread critical acclaim for many polished aspects of its design, such as its compelling characters, setting, story, and gameplay. Cave Story is considered by many as one of the most influential video games of all time. It became an influence on indie games and the video game industry. It demonstrated the ability of a single person to develop a video game compared to the large manpower of major video game studios.

Independent video game developer Nicalis worked with Amaya to port the game to WiiWare and DSiWare in 2010. An enhanced version, Cave Story+, was released for Steam in November 2011, and the original game was released for the Nintendo 3DS in October 2012 with added content. A 3D remake of the game, titled Cave Story 3D, was developed by Nicalis and published by NIS America for the Nintendo 3DS in November 2011. A port of Cave Story+ for the Nintendo Switch was released in June 2017, with many visual enhancements. In 2026, the Steam version of the game was updated to more closely resemble the Switch version.

== Gameplay ==
Cave Story's simple controls allow for movement, running, jumping, and shooting. The heads-up display in the top left displays an equipped weapon, weapon level, and current health. The yellow triangles represent experience points to be picked up.

The player controls the on-screen character directly using a keyboard or gamepad. They progress by navigating platforming challenges and shooting enemies with the equipped weapon. When the player collects multiple weapons, they may be toggled at any time with the press of a button. Defeating enemies may yield yellow triangular crystals, which give experience points to weapons when collected, hearts that partially restore their health, or missile ammunition. Weapons may be improved up to level three, but taking damage causes weapons to lose experience and levels. Health and missile capacity upgrades are scattered throughout the game world. The player also interacts with many non-player characters and objects while playing the game.

== Plot ==
=== Setting ===
Cave Story takes place within the cavernous interior of a floating island. The island is populated by Mimiga, a race of sentient, rabbit-like creatures. A particular species of red flower that grows in the island causes the normally peaceful Mimiga to fall into a violent frenzy when ingested. The island also conceals an artifact called the Demon Crown, which has vast magical powers. An army of robot soldiers were sent to the floating island on a military expedition, seeking to harness the Demon Crown as a weapon for wars on the surface. These robots slaughtered the Mimiga indiscriminately in their search for the crown, but were defeated when the Mimiga decided to eat the red flowers as a last resort. Shortly before the game begins, Professor Booster, the Sakamoto family, and various assistants formed a scientific party to research the island, but they became stranded when their medical doctor, Fuyuhiko Date, managed to acquire the Crown; he then forced the expedition to search for the red flowers.

=== Story ===
The player awakens in a cave with no memory of how he came to be there. He finds a village of Mimiga, who are being persecuted by the Doctor. The Doctor's servants Misery and Balrog are looking for Sue Sakamoto, a girl who had been transformed into a Mimiga. Not finding her, they mistakenly abduct another Mimiga named Toroko instead. The player finds Sue in the Egg Corridor, where she discovers the egg of a Sky Dragon, which could allow her to escape the floating island if hatched. Sue attempts to rescue her brother Kazuma, but King, the leader of Mimiga Village, captures her and holds her responsible for Toroko's kidnapping. Sue tasks the player with retrieving Kazuma from Grasstown. After freeing him, they meet Professor Booster, who reveals that the Doctor plans to use the red flowers on Mimigas to create an army to take over the surface world. Booster sends the player to the Sand Zone to destroy the red flowers before the Doctor can find them. While there, the player meets Curly Brace, a female robot who also has no memories of her past, and Jenka, an old witch who is Misery's mother and guardian of the red flowers. Jenka calls the player character a "soldier from the surface", one of many who were sent to the island to slaughter the Mimiga. Balrog manages to steal the key to the warehouse containing the red flowers from Jenka, who urges the player to stop them. Before the player can reach the warehouse, however, the Doctor force-feeds the captured Toroko a red flower and fatally injures King, leaving the player to fight the rabid Toroko, who ultimately dies.

Misery banishes the player to the Labyrinth deep inside the island as punishment for interfering with the Doctor's plans. Curly Brace has also been thrown into the Labyrinth and the two cooperate to escape. Balrog helps them to move the boulder blocking the exit, revealing his kind nature. The pair find and defeat the Core, a magical creature whose power keeps the island afloat, but the Doctor steps in to save it before the island collapses. Depending on certain conditions, the player may rescue Curly Brace, who had sacrificed her air tank to save the player character. When the player returns to Mimiga Village, they find that the Doctor has captured the Mimiga. In the now-ruined Egg Corridor, Kazuma offers the player a choice to escape the island with him using a Sky Dragon, leading to an alternate ending in which the Doctor conquers the surface world while Kazuma and the player hide in the mountains. The player may instead choose to confront the Doctor and destroy the island's Core, which would return the Mimiga to normal. The player scales the outer wall of the island to reach the Plantation where the Doctor is using the Mimigas as slave laborers to grow red flowers. The Doctor's servants capture the player and place him in a jail cell with Sue. She is taken away before the player wakes up, but her letter reveals that the Doctor was a member of the research expedition that included Sue's family and Professor Booster, but he betrayed them once he found the Demon Crown. Sue directs the player to find her mother who may have a plan to stop the Doctor.

If the player saved Curly Brace earlier, they may find an item to restore her memories. Curly remembers that the player character's name is Quote, and that they were not the killer robots who slaughtered Mimigas in the past. Instead, they were sent to destroy the Demon Crown to prevent its power from falling into the wrong hands.

Quote finds Sue's mother, Momorin, who is building a rocket that will allow access to the top of the island where the Doctor resides. After helping her complete the rocket, Quote confronts Misery and the Doctor. The Doctor has purified the essence of the red flowers into a crystal, which allows him to survive even after Quote kills him. The Doctor's spirit possesses the Core of the island, but Quote succeeds in destroying that as well, causing the island to begin falling to Earth. Unless Quote has saved Curly, restored her memories, and acquired the Booster v2.0 from Professor Booster, Sue will lead Quote to jump off the island. The two are rescued by Kazuma and his Sky Dragon, while Momorin, her assistant Itoh, and the captured Mimiga escape on a helicopter, leaving the rest of the island's inhabitants to their fates.

Should Quote complete the aforementioned tasks, they may proceed into the Blood-Stained Sanctuary, a bonus stage where Curly can be found and rescued; it is also here where Ballos — creator of the Demon Crown and Jenka's younger brother — is imprisoned. A powerful wizard who went insane and destroyed his homeland after being tortured by a jealous king, Ballos was sealed deep within the island by his sister. At some point, his niece Misery forced him to create the Demon Crown, but she and Balrog became cursed to serve whoever possessed it. Additionally, it is stated via narration that the Demon Crown will repair itself upon being destroyed, and it will only truly lose its power if Ballos is killed, necessitating that Quote and Curly kill him.

With the help of Curly Brace, Quote defeats Ballos and stops the source of the negative energy that was causing the island to fall, saving its inhabitants. Balrog saves the two before they are crushed by Ballos' collapsing prison; Balrog had been sent by Misery as thanks for breaking her curse. Quote, Curly Brace, and Balrog leave the island to live out their days in peace.

== Development ==
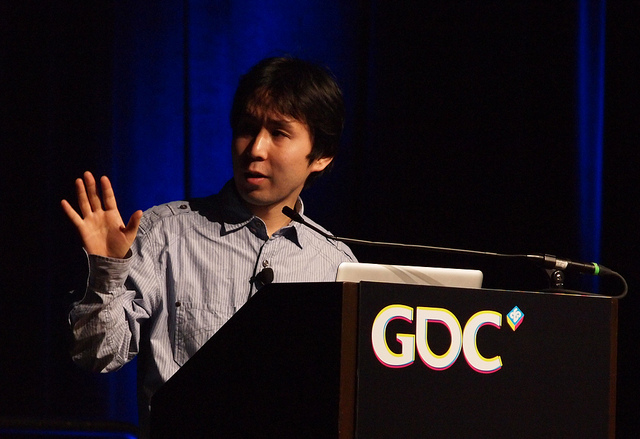
Daisuke "Pixel" Amaya programmed, illustrated, designed, wrote the story for, and composed the music to Cave Story over the course of five years.

Daisuke "Pixel" Amaya developed Cave Story in his free time over five years. He began the project when he was in college and continued working on it after getting a job as a software developer. He started by writing the title screen music and programming rudimentary character movements. The idea for the cave setting evolved spontaneously when he created a number of enclosed spaces. Amaya admitted this lack of planning caused "problems down the line" because he did not have dedicated map editing and data management tools. Amaya describes the game as having an "old-fashioned feel", reminiscent of the games he played as a child, like Metroid. More importantly, this "retro" design choice allowed him to create a large amount of art on his own, which would have been impossible for a 3D game.

At a Game Developers Conference project post-mortem, he emphasized the role of pragmatic design in shaping the game. While designing the main character, "Quote", Amaya drew inspiration from Mario's appearance, giving him a large, expressive face and a high contrast between his white skin and red pants that made him stand out from the dark cave backgrounds. Most other characters feature either light skin or white clothes for the same reason. To make levels memorable, Amaya designed them around a single theme, such as "warmth" for the Egg Corridor, and "arid and oppressive" for the Sand Zone. Instead of a tutorial level, a concept Amaya dislikes, the first level of the game gives the player two paths, one of which is blocked off until retrieving an item from the other path. This setup, inspired by the opening of Metroid, "lets players feel like they've solved problems on their own" and persists throughout the game. In beta versions of the game, all the enemies were shaped like bars of soap, a concept that evolved into the "Balrog" character. There was also a "frog prince" character who could travel through water more easily. Elements of this beta were incorporated into the Nintendo 3DS version of the game.

== Versions and ports ==
=== Ports ===
An enhanced port, featuring updated character designs, remixed music and extra game modes, was developed by Nicalis and released on WiiWare on 22 March 2010 in North America and 10 December 2010 in Europe. Nicalis also ported the game to DSiWare on 29 November 2010 in North America and 22 November 2011 in Japan. Although it does not feature the enhanced graphics and sound or some of the extra modes from the Wii version, it does include the Sanctuary Attack mode. The game was released for the Nintendo 3DS's Nintendo eShop service (separate from the retail 3DS game) in the United States on 4 October 2012 and in Europe on 1 May 2014. This version includes the DSiWare version's Jukebox mode, as well as all the additional modes included in Cave Story+.

=== Cave Story+ ===
An enhanced PC version titled Cave Story+ was released by Nicalis on the Steam service on 22 November 2011. This version contains all the additional modes from the WiiWare version, a remastered soundtrack, as well as the option to toggle the style of graphics between the classic style and that of the WiiWare version and the music of the original game, the WiiWare port, or the 3DS update. It also features an exclusive 'Wind Fortress' level. The game got an update that added an exclusive Machine Gun Challenge. The game was included as a bonus game in the Humble Indie Bundle 4 sale in December 2011, Humble Bundle 7 in December 2012, and was released on the Desura service in April 2012. On 19 January 2017, Nicalis announced a port of Cave Story+ on the Nintendo Switch, which released on 20 June 2017. This physical version is packaged with a full-color manual for the game and a Mini CD containing arrangements of the game's soundtrack made in FamiTracker, a chiptune music tracker based on the Famicom's synthesizers. It also added two-player cooperative gameplay and remixed version of the original soundtrack by the composers of The Binding of Isaac: Rebirth. Additionally, GameStop purchases of the Nintendo Switch version include one of three keychains modeled after Quote, Curly, and Balrog. The additions from this version were later incorporated into the PC version via a 2026 update.

=== Cave Story 3D ===
Cave Story 3D is a 3D version of the game developed by Nicalis and published by NIS America as a retail title for the Nintendo 3DS. It was released on 8 November 2011 in North America, 11 November 2011 in Europe and 26 July 2012 in Japan. The game was built from scratch using 3D character models, featuring a dynamic camera system and another additional level, as well as a remixed soundtrack by Danny Baranowsky and Dustin Kulwicki. The Japanese version features crossover content from various NIS and other companies' franchises such as Crazy Climber, Ikki, and Dragon Slayer. In order to devote more time to perfecting the title, Amaya quit his job as a software developer to become director of Cave Story 3D. He remarked that the transition to 3D was difficult because it required the consideration of so many more details.

== Reception ==
Reception

Aggregate score
Aggregator	Score
Metacritic	WII: 89/100; 3DS (3D): 82/100; PC (+): 82/100; 3DS: 93/100; NS: 88/100

Review scores
Publication	Score
1Up.com	WII: A 3DS: B+
Destructoid	WII: 9.5/10; 3DS: 8.5/10
Edge	WII: 8/10
Eurogamer	WII: 9/10; 3DS: 8/10
Famitsu	3DS: 30/40
Game Informer	WII: 8.75/10; 3DS: 8.00/10
IGN	WII: 8.5/10; 3DS: 8.5/10

The original Cave Story earned widespread critical acclaim. 1UP.com described it as "so massive that it rivals modern [Game Boy Advance] Castlevania and Metroid games in terms of scope and play time". Matt Miller of Game Informer observed that it combines elements of Metroid, Ninja Gaiden, Mega Man, The Legend of Zelda, and Castlevania into an "engrossing, challenging, and quite lengthy" whole. Inside Mac Games credited the game's popularity to its "polished feel, engaging storyline, and compelling artwork". John Szczepaniak of Retro Gamer magazine named it his favorite game of all time.

Electronic Gaming Monthly stated that "the burgeoning Western indie game scene owes a tremendous debt to Japanese pioneers like Studio Pixel, whose freeware hit Cave Story proved that with sufficient vision, skill, and passion, a single developer can still craft a deep, compelling action game". Jonathan Holmes of Destructoid compared the game design to that of Shigeru Miyamoto in its ability to teach without tutorials, like at the beginning of Super Mario Bros. In July 2006, Cave Story earned 1st place in Super PLAY's list of the 50 best freeware games of all time. In July 2015, the game placed 14th on USgamer's The 15 Best Games Since 2000 list.

The WiiWare version has received mostly positive reviews, with the central criticism being the 1200 Wii Point price tag (US$12, £10), after years of free play. Jeremy Parish of 1UP.com commended the graphical update, which "sacrifices none of [the game's] classic-influenced charm". He also remarked that the Classic Controller and Wii Remote are superior to the keyboard input of the PC original. On the issue of price, he explained that "the prospect of Amaya finally earning a little something for the hard work he invested in this masterpiece strikes me as satisfyingly poetic" and "absolutely worth your money". John Teti of Eurogamer had similar sentiments, but also noted the technical issues with the remixed music, recommending the original soundtrack. Edge compared the remake to The Secret of Monkey Island: Special Edition, satisfying both modern tastes with its graphical overhaul and old school fans with the option to switch to the original graphics. Daemon Hatfield of IGN felt that Cave Story "belongs on a Nintendo system" and noted gameplay similarities to Blaster Master, in which damage reduces the power of weapons as well. Cave Story was nominated for Game of the Year at the 2010 Nintendo Power Awards, as well as WiiWare Game of the Year.

Criticism of Cave Story 3D echoed that of the WiiWare version. Many reviewers cautioned that the graphical update does not justify the $40 initial price point, especially with cheaper or free versions of the game available through download services. Parish defended the release, deriving satisfaction from the game's availability as a physical cartridge. Holmes praised the dynamic camera system and new graphics, comparing them to Disney films. He considers this release to be the "best version of the game, [but] not necessarily the definitive version". Jane Douglas of GameSpot felt that the 3DS Circle Pad was a comfortable fit for the game's control scheme. Audrey Drake of IGN noted that the 3D effect made it difficult to distinguish certain platforms between background and foreground, a complaint shared by Douglas. Simon Parkin of the UK Official Nintendo Magazine was more critical, citing lack of detail in the 3D models and a too-dark color palette. Japanese magazine Famitsu Weekly's four reviewers scored it 7, 7, 8, and 8 points out of 10 to a total of 30 out of 40 points, indicating average reviews. This version was nominated for Best Adventure Game at the 2011 Nintendo Power Awards.

As of July 2018, Cave Story+ has sold an estimated 590,104 digital units on Steam.

== Legacy ==
Quote appears as a downloadable character in Bit.Trip Presents... Runner2: Future Legend of Rhythm Alien. Curly Brace appears as a bonus playable character in 1001 Spikes. Both Curly Brace and Quote appear as playable characters in the crossover fighting game Blade Strangers. Quote, Curly Brace and Ballos are featured as playable characters in Nicalis' puzzle game Crystal Crisis. Quote's hat is also featured in the game Terraria.

=== Impact ===
Cave Story is considered to be one of the most influential video games to be released between the mid-2000s and the mid-2010s. The game had a massive impact on the indie game industry, with its acclaim and success demonstrating that a one-person development team could rival major studios. It is also one of the most internationally successful Japanese indie (dōjin soft) games, and contributed to the resurgence of the Metroidvania genre. The game's critical acclaim demonstrated the scope of what one person could do, and highlighted another take on the Metroidvania genre. It also vitalized the 2D platform game genre as a viable indie game format.

The success of Cave Story paved the way for a large number of retro-themed 2D platformers that have appeared since the mid-2000s. Jonathan Holmes of Destructoid called Cave Story an "important game", observing its influence on artistic indie games like Braid, as well as the continued relevance of 2D game design (cf. Capcom's Mega Man 9).

The game has also inspired several fan projects. Independent developers have unofficially ported the game to other systems, such as Sega Genesis. Rapper Lee=EmCee² spent 17 years writing an album titled Cave Story: A Lyrical Walkthrough, which acts as both an arrangement of the soundtrack and a walkthrough of this game, before releasing in 2026.

=== Legal issues ===
Despite the freeware nature of the game's initial release, official rereleases by Nicalis (since taking over its publishing for major platforms) have caused ambiguity regarding the usage of Cave Story's copyright and assets. Further confusion has been caused by cease and desist letters as well as DMCA actions against fan projects using the game's assets as well as its decompiled codebase. Most notably, CSE2, a rewrite of Cave Story's engine using freeware assets was taken down at request of Nicalis in late 2020; despite the company having no seeming relation to or possession of the original freeware release. The actions taken against projects using the decompiled code from the free release, including a game engine built atop this code, had been met with criticism from game developers since this action seems to apply retrospective rights that Nicalis did not have on the original release by Amaya.

=== Cave Story's Secret Santa ===
On 8 December 2021, Tyrone Rodriguez of Nicalis teased a new Cave Story spin-off title, which was revealed to be Cave Story's Secret Santa on 9 December. This was a free game created in cooperation with Studio Pixel, and was made available on 9 December 2021. This game is based around the character Santa, a mimiga met in Cave Story, and is a stealth and puzzle-solving game set before the events of Cave Story.
