= Super Play (Sweden) =

Swedish video game magazine

- editor in chief: Tobias Bjarneby
- Publisher: Hjemmet Mortensen
- First issue: March 1993
- Final issue: August 2009
- Country: Sweden
- Based in: Stockholm
- Language: Swedish
- Website: superplay.se (archived)
- ISSN: 1401-8519

Super Play (often abbreviated SP) was a Swedish video game magazine. Started in March 1993 with the name Super Power, it was the first independent video game magazine in Sweden. Despite its independence, it initially only covered Nintendo games, but the coverage was extended to all major consoles in 1995. The name was changed in March 1996, and in June 2001 the magazine started covering PC games. Its monthly circulation was in 2003 25,000. The editor in chief until November 2004 was Tobias Bjarneby, who left along with a large segment of the staff to form the new magazine Reset (which later merged with the magazine Player 1 to form Level). The last editor in chief was Joakim Bennet, who succeeded Tommy Rydling in mid-2007.

On 17 August 2009, Joakim Bennet announced that the magazine would be disestablished within the near future. The last issue was released in October 2009. The last issue was dedicated to earlier versions of the magazine, which almost the entire magazine, including a behind-the-scenes and quotes from various numbers from all years. Also was an exclusive script describing the change from Super POWER to Super PLAY, which apparently was supposed to be called simply "Play", and the reviews all having the same layout from previous versions of the magazine, in addition to comments from the readers and exact same ads as previous versions, obviously outdated by then. Notoriously, the review of the PlayStation 3 game Uncharted 2: Among Thieves was the only one based on the layout used 1996-99 and had a yellow stripe, which was the color used by reviews on games from the original PlayStation.

A translated Finnish version was published from 1993 to 2001.

== Trivia ==
- Patrick Söderlund, now the CEO of Embark Studios wrote for the magazine in the mid-1990s.
- A copy of Super PLAY can be found in the game Metal Gear Solid 3: Snake Eater.
- Super PLAY was originally called Super POWER.
