= Umihara =

Umihara may refer to:

- Umihara Kawase
- Umihara Kawase (video game)
- Umihara Kawase Shun
- Sayonara Umihara Kawase

== See also ==
- Umihana
