= List of crossovers in video games =

This is a list of crossovers in video games. "Crossovers" occur when otherwise usually separated fictional elements - video game characters, settings, and gameplay mechanics - exist and interact in the same video game.

== First and second-party crossovers ==
This list includes crossovers and cameos of characters from video games owned by one company and close affiliates.

Video game	Featuring
Alex Kidd in Shinobi World	A crossover between 2 Sega properties, taking Shinobi settings and themes and combining it with Alex Kidd character and platforming gameplay.
Anarchy Reigns	A beat em up game featuring playable characters from 2 PlatinumGames' series; Bayonetta from her respective series, and multiple characters from MadWorld.
Animal Crossing: New Horizons	The player can purchase several costumes and decorations inspired by the Mario, The Legend of Zelda, and Splatoon franchises.
Asura's Wrath	Asura's Wrath, a Capcom action game, has DLC, that features the ability to fight Street Fighter-styled fights with 2 characters from the series, Ryu and Akuma.
Super Bomberman R	DLC updates added characters from Konami's other franchises as playable characters with unique abilities in the game's classic Bomberman multiplayer, including Vic Viper from Gradius, Simon Belmont from Castlevania, Pyramid Head from Silent Hill, and Solid Snake, Naked Snake, & Raiden from Metal Gear.
Bye-Bye BoxBoy!	The protagonist can wear costumes based on characters from the Kirby series via amiibo.
Cannon Spike	Mega Man, Cammy and Charlie from Street Fighter, Arthur from Ghosts 'n Goblins, Baby Bonnie Hood from Darkstalkers, and Shiba Shintaro from Three Wonders.
Capcom Fighting Evolution	Fighting game featuring characters from Capcom's Street Fighter, Darkstalkers, and Red Earth.
Catherine: Full Body	Joker from Persona 5 is a DLC playable character for the game's non-story modes, and other members of the cast provide gameplay commentary, all with the original voice actors.
Christmas Nights	Sonic the Hedgehog appears as an unlockable playable character in the Sega Saturn version.
Civilization V: Brave New World	This expansion pack for Civilization V allowed for the recruiting of characters from XCOM: Enemy Unknown.
Crash Bandicoot Purple: Ripto's Rampage and Spyro Orange: The Cortex Conspiracy	A game combining the characters, gameplay, and worlds of the Crash Bandicoot and Spyro the Dragon series.
Dengeki Bunko: Fighting Climax	A fighting game with a roster of playable characters coming from a number of ASCII Media Works' Dengeki Bunko publishing line. Some Sega characters also appeared, including Akira Yuki of Virtua Fighter and Selvaria Bles from Valkyria Chronicles.
Disgaea	A Strategy role-playing game series that features characters from other Nippon Ichi Software developed games, notably including characters from La Pucelle: Tactics, Makai Kingdom: Chronicles of the Sacred Tome and The Witch and the Hundred Knight.
DK: King of Swing	Bubbles from Clu Clu Land can be unlocked as a playable character.
Ehrgeiz: God Bless the Ring	The game took characters from the JRPG Final Fantasy VII (Cloud Strife, Tifa Lockhart, Yuffie Kisaragi, Sephiroth, Vincent Valentine, and Zack Fair) and integrated them into the Ehrgeiz fighting game setting and gameplay.
Fighters Megamix	A fighting game with the characters primarily coming from Sega's Virtua Fighter and Fighting Vipers game, with some additional unlockable characters coming from other Sega franchises.
Final Fantasy XI and XIV	Square Enix's two Final Fantasy MMORPG did cross over events with other Square Enix franchises, and at times, even each other.
Dissidia Final Fantasy series	A fighting game subseries of the Final Fantasy JRPG series, featuring a player roster consisting of characters from various series entries.
Final Fantasy Record Keeper	A mobile game that sees a cast of original characters see battles from past Final Fantasy entries recreated, later expanding out to other Square Enix franchises as well.
Final Fantasy Brave Exvius	A mobile game featuring crossovers with many franchises many game franchises and even a few real life people in special events.
Growtopia	Ubi Soft's 2D MMO sandbox game allowed for the integration of many characters and elements from a number of their other franchises, including Rayman, Assassin's Creed, and Far Cry.
Harvey Birdman: Attorney at Law	A game set in the Harvey Birdman: Attorney at Law universe featuring many characters from the Street Fighter fighting game franchise - both of which were published by Capcom.
Heroes of the Storm	A MOBA that features various characters and themed levels from Blizzard's franchises such as Warcraft, Diablo, StarCraft, and Overwatch.
Dragon Quest & Final Fantasy in Itadaki Street Portable	An iteration of the Itadaki Street series featuring characters from the Dragon Quest and Final Fantasy franchises.
Killer Instinct (2013)	Rash from Battletoads, the Arbiter from Halo, and General RAAM from Gears of War appear as guest characters.
Konami Wai Wai World	A series of Japan-only platformers featuring characters from a variety of Konami's franchises.
Konami Krazy Racers	A kart racing game featuring characters from a variety of Konami's franchises.
Last Legion UX	A pair of mecha based on Bomberman appear as secret unlockable characters.
Lego Dimensions	A lego game featuring content from over 30 franchises across film, comics, television, and other video game series.
Mario Kart 8 Deluxe	Features playable characters from various other Nintendo franchises, including Link (The Legend of Zelda) Isabelle and the Villager (Animal Crossing) and the Inklings (Splatoon). Zelda, Animal Crossing, F-Zero, and Excitebike race courses also exist along with a Splatoon battle arena.
Shin Megami Tensei: Liberation Dx2	A special collaboration event with Bayonetta
Minecraft	Skins based on characters from Halo, Gears of War, Banjo-Kazooie, Dust: An Elysian Tail, and Conker
Mortal Kombat vs. DC Universe	Mortal Kombat and DC Comics characters
Mortal Kombat (2011)	Freddy Krueger from the Nightmare on Elm Street film series appears as DLC
Mortal Kombat X	Jason Voorhees from the Friday the 13th film series and a Predator from the "Predator" series appear as DLC for Kombat Pack 1, a Xenomorph from The Alien film series and Leatherface from The Texas Chainsaw Massacre series later appeared as DLC for Kombat Pack 2. Freddy Krueger also returns as a mobile version exclusive character on the Update 1.11 of the game
MultiVersus	A fighting game featuring characters and levels pulled from multiple Warner Bros. owned franchises.
Naruto Shippuden: Ultimate Ninja Storm 2	Lars Alexandersson from Tekken
NeoGeo Battle Coliseum	An SNK fighting game featuring over 30 characters pulled from various SNK franchises.
New International Track & Field	Solid Snake, Simon Belmont from Castlevania, Frogger, Pyramid Head from Silent Hill, Pentarou from Parodius, Sparkster from Rocket Knight Adventures, Evil Rose from Rumble Roses, and Power Pro-kun from Power Pros
Ninja Gaiden	Ayane from Dead or Alive
Nitroplus Blasterz: Heroines Infinite Duel	Various Nitroplus characters
Onimusha Blade Warriors	MegaMan.EXE and Zero
Overwatch	Skins based on Illidan, Tyrande, Blackhand and Magni Bronzebeard from Warcraft, Barbarian class and the Butcher from Diablo, and Nova from StarCraft universe
Pac-Man Fever	Reiko Nagase from Ridge Racer, Astaroth from Soulcalibur, and Heihachi Mishima and Tiger Jackson from Tekken
Pac-Man World Rally	Characters and race tracks from Dig-Dug, Galaga, Katamari Damacy, Mappy, and Mr. Driller
Penny Arcade Adventures: Episode 3	Cthulhu Saves the World and Molly the Were-Zompire
Persona 4 Arena	Crossover with the casts of Persona 3 and Persona 4
Persona 4 Arena Ultimax	Crossover with the casts of Persona 3 and Persona 4
Persona Q: Shadow of the Labyrinth	Crossover with the casts of Persona 3 and Persona 4
Persona Q2: New Cinema Labyrinth	Crossover with the casts of Persona 3, Persona 4, and Persona 5
PlayStation All-Stars Battle Royale	A PlayStation-themed fighting game in the vein of Super Smash Bros. with an entire roster of playable characters and stages pulled from various PlayStation-related franchises.
PlayStation Move Heroes	Crossover of the Ratchet & Clank, Jak and Daxter and Sly Cooper franchises in an action-adventure game centered around the PlayStation Move's motion control.
Power Rangers: Legacy Wars	Characters from the entire Power Rangers franchise, including the TV series, the Boom Studios' comic book series, and the 2017 film
Power Rangers: Battle for the Grid	Characters from the entire Power Rangers franchise, including the TV series, the Boom Studios' comic book series, and the 2017 film
Prince of Persia: The Forgotten Sands	Ezio Auditore from Assassin's Creed II
Psi-Ops: The Mindgate Conspiracy	Scorpion from Mortal Kombat
Puyo Puyo Tetris	Combines the gameplay of Tetris and the gameplay, characters, and setting of Puyo Puyo. Sonic the Hedgehog also makes a guest appearance as a playable character in Puyo Puyo Tetris 2.
Puyo Puyo Tetris 2	Combines the gameplay of Tetris and the gameplay, characters, and setting of Puyo Puyo. Sonic the Hedgehog also makes a guest appearance as a playable character in Puyo Puyo Tetris 2.
Samurai Shodown (2019)	Hibiki Takane from The Last Blade 2 is added as a DLC character for Season Pass 3.
Samurai Warriors	Lu Bu of Dynasty Warriors makes an appearance as a hidden boss
Saturday Night Slam Masters	Mike Haggar from Final Fight
Super Scribblenauts	The Japanese version includes cameos of many characters from Metal Gear, The Legend of the Mystical Ninja, Castlevania, Gradius, and Loveplus as it was published by Konami
Scribblenauts Unmasked: A DC Comics Adventure	An entry in the Scribblenauts series that involves mixed its characters and gameplay and with various DC Comics characters and settings.
Sega Superstars Tennis	A tennis game with its roster of playable characters coming from a number of different Sega franchises, with tennis courts themed around their respective games.
Sega Heroes	A match three mobile game featuring characters pulled from many Sega franchises.
Segagaga	Cameos and callbacks to Sega characters and series including Sonic the Hedgehog, Ristar, Alex Kidd, Sir Pepper III from Clockwork Knight, Nei from Phantasy Star 2, Opa-Opa from Fantasy Zone, the Bad Brothers from Golden Axe, Panda from Baku Baku Animal, Amigo from Samba de Amigo, and the F-14 Tomcat from After Burner
Anna Kournikova's Smash Court Tennis	Richard Miller from Time Crisis, Heihachi Mishima, Eddy Gordo and Yoshimitsu from Tekken, Reiko Nagase from Ridge Racer, and Pac-Man
Smash Court Tennis Pro Tournament 2	Heihachi Mishima and Ling Xiaoyu from Tekken, and Cassandra Alexandra and Raphael Sorel from Soulcalibur
SNK Gals' Fighters	Several female characters: Mai Shiranui from Fatal Fury; Nakoruru and Shiki from Samurai Shodown; Yuri Sakazaki from Art of Fighting; Athena Asamiya from Psycho Soldier; Ikari Ichijou from The Last Blade; Leona Heidern, Shermie, Whip, Yuki Kushinada, and Iori Yagami (as Miss X) from The King of Fighters
SNK Heroines: Tag Team Frenzy	The fighting game's character roster is largely made of characters from various SNK video games, such as Fatal Fury, Art of Fighting, and The King of Fighters.
Solomon's Key	Jack from Bomb Jack makes an appearance in certain rooms
Sonic & Sega All-Stars Racing	A racing game with its roster of playable characters coming from a number of different Sega franchises, with race courses themed around their respective games.
Sonic & All-Stars Racing Transformed	A racing game with its roster of playable characters coming from a number of different Sega franchises, with race courses themed around their respective games.
Sonic Pinball Party	Pinball tables and elements themed after NiGHTS into Dreams..., Samba de Amigo, ChuChu Rocket!, Phantasy Star, and Burning Rangers
Sonic Racing: CrossWorlds	Hatsune Miku, Ichiban Kasuga, Joker, Nights, and AiAi are playable via free updates.
Sonic Riders	AiAi from Super Monkey Ball, Ulala from Space Channel 5, and NiGHTS from NiGHTS into Dreams...
Sonic Riders: Zero Gravity	Amigo from Samba de Amigo, Billy Hatcher from Billy Hatcher and the Giant Egg, and NiGHTS from NiGHTS into Dreams...
Soulcalibur II	Heihachi Mishima from Tekken in the PS2 and HD versions
Soulcalibur Legends	Lloyd Irving from Tales of Symphonia
Steel Diver: Sub Wars	A paid DLC submarine, the Blue Marine, is based on the Great Fox ship from Star Fox
Street Fighter Alpha 2	Ken's stage features several cameos in the background from other Capcom series: Morrigan Aensland, Felicia, Zabel, Hsien Ko, and Mei Ling from Darkstalkers, Strider Hiryu, Captain Commando and Ginzu from Captain Commando, Jumbo and Biff Slamkovich from Saturday Night Slam Masters, Michelle Heart from Legendary Wings, Pure the Mage from Adventure Quiz, and Linn Kurosawa from Alien vs. Predator.
Street Fighter V	Crossover costumes for certain characters based on other characters from Mega Man, Resident Evil, Darkstalkers, Devil May Cry, Monster Hunter, Ghosts 'n Goblins, Viewtiful Joe, Captain Commando, Asura's Wrath, Star Gladiator, Breath of Fire II, Red Earth, Forgotten Worlds, Onimusha, CyberBots: Full Metal Madness, Haunting Ground, and Capcom Fighting All-Stars
Street Fighter X Mega Man	Street Fighter characters in Mega Man levels.
Stunt Race FX	Arwings from Star Fox can appear and drop power-ups for the player. Fox McCloud, Mario, and Luigi also appear in some billboards in certain racetracks
Super Gem Fighter Mini Mix	Street Fighter, Darkstalkers, and Red Earth
Super Mario Maker	Various Nintendo characters were made playable in the 8-bit levels based on which amiibo were scanned while playing the game.
Super Monkey Ball: Banana Blitz HD	Sonic is an unlockable character.
Super Monkey Ball Banana Mania	Sonic and Tails, Kazuma Kiryu from Yakuza, and Beat from Jet Set Radio are unlockable characters. Morgana from Persona 5 appears via downloadable content.
Super Puzzle Fighter II Turbo	Various characters from Street Fighter, Darkstalkers, and CyberBots: Full Metal Madness
Super Smash Bros. series	A fighting game series featuring playable characters, stages, and other elements from a number of different Nintendo franchises.
Taiko no Tatsujin: Drum 'n' Fun!	Songs from Pac-Man Championship Edition 2, The Idolm@ster Cinderella Girls, Techno Drive, Critical Velocity, Assault, Ridge Racer, and The Genji and the Heike Clans
Tales of Vs.	A fighting game in the vein of Super Smash Bros. featuring a player roster consisting of characters from various games in the Tales of series.
Teenage Mutant Ninja Turtles: Smash-Up	Rabbids are playable exclusively on the Wii version
Teppen	Mobile card game featuring characters from Mega Man X, Street Fighter, Monster Hunter, Devil May Cry, Darkstalkers, and Resident Evil
Tetris	Mario and Luigi appear in the multiplayer mode. A secret ending features Mario, Luigi, Princess Peach, Bowser, Donkey Kong, Link, and Pit playing instruments and congratulating the player
Tetris Attack	Characters from Super Mario World 2: Yoshi's Island
Tetris DS	Boards and minigames themed around Super Mario Bros., Super Mario Bros. 3, The Legend of Zelda, Metroid, Donkey Kong, Balloon Fight, Ice Climber, Excitebike, Devil World, Urban Champion, Duck Hunt, and Yoshi's Cookie
Tetris 99	Several free updates have added boards based on contemporary Nintendo Switch games, such as Splatoon 2, Fire Emblem: Three Houses, and Pokémon Sword and Shield.
The King of Fighters series	Characters from 3 Count Bout, Fatal Fury, Art of Fighting, Psycho Soldier, Ikari Warriors, Buriki One, Burning Fight, Robo Army, Aggressors of Dark Kombat, Top Hunter: Roddy & Cathy, Savage Reign, Kizuna Encounter, Metal Slug, World Heroes, Sky Love, Dragon Gal, Samurai Shodown, and The Last Blade
The Legend of Zelda: Link's Awakening	Different elements from the Super Mario and the Kirby series appear during the game. Richard from the Japan-only game For the Frog the Bell Tolls also makes a rather niche cameo appearance.
The Legend of Zelda: Breath of the Wild	Armor based on Rex's outfit from Xenoblade Chronicles 2
Tom Clancy's Elite Squad	Mobile RPG featuring characters from Rainbow Six, Splinter Cell, The Division, and Ghost Recon
Tom Clancy's Ghost Recon: Wildlands	Sam Fisher from Tom Clancy's Splinter Cell
Tony Hawk's Project 8	The Grim Reaper from Guitar Hero
TowerFall	Madeline and Badeline from Celeste
Trick'N Snowboarder	Claire Redfield and Leon S. Kennedy from Resident Evil
Under Night In-Birth	Sion Eltnam Atlasia (dubbed as Eltnum) from Melty Blood
Unreal Championship 2	Raiden from Mortal Kombat
Urban Reign	Paul Phoenix and Marshall Law from Tekken
Varth: Operation Thunderstorm	Ryu from Street Fighter
Venus & Braves	Multiple Tales series characters on the PSP remake
Viewtiful Joe	Dante from Devil May Cry is a playable character in the PlayStation 2 version
Wangan Midnight	Shutokou Battle series characters
Warriors All-Stars	Features characters from Ninja Gaiden, Dead or Alive, Nioh, Samurai Warriors, Dynasty Warriors, Toukiden: The Age of Demons, Deception, Haruka: Beyond the Stream of Time, Nights of Azure, Rio, Opoona, Atelier, and Samurai Cats
Warriors Orochi	Dynasty Warriors and Samurai Warriors
Warriors Orochi 3	Ryu Hayabusa, Momiji, and Rachel from Ninja Gaiden; Kasumi and Ayane from Dead or Alive, Joan of Arc from Bladestorm: The Hundred Years' War, Achilles from Warriors: Legends of Troy, Nemea from Trinity: Souls of Zill O’ll, and Sterkenburg Cranach from Atelier
Warriors Orochi 4 Ultimate	Joan of Arc and Ryu Hayabusa return
We Love Golf!	Playable golfers: Ryu, Ken Masters, Chun-Li, Guile and Sakura Kasugano from Street Fighter; Jill Valentine from Resident Evil; Morrigan Aensland from Darkstalkers; Apollo Justice and Pearl Fey from Ace Attorney; Arthur from Ghosts 'n Goblins; Zack from Zack & Wiki: Quest for Barbaros' Tresure
World Kicks	Klonoa and Pac-Man can be part of a soccer team
World of Final Fantasy	A game that follows two original characters in a JRPG that sees them interact from many characters and settings from the Final Fantasy franchise.
Yo-kai Watch: Wibble Wobble	Characters from Professor Layton, Inazuma Eleven, Snack World, and Ni no Kuni appear as Yo-kai
Zenless Zone Zero	Robin and Kafka from Honkai: Star Rail playabe in faction member of Unknown Realm

== Third-party crossovers ==
This list includes video games that have crossovers from two or more separate companies.

Video game	Featuring
Angry Birds Epic	Sonic the Hedgehog is a playable character. Enemies from Puzzle & Dragons can be fought
Animal Crossing: New Leaf	Felyne can be invited to move into the player's town by scanning any Monster Hunter amiibo. Furniture based on Sanrio characters Hello Kitty, My Melody, Kero Kero Keroppi, Little Twin Stars, Pom Pom Purin, and Cinnamoroll can be added via their corresponding amiibo card
Animal Crossing: Happy Home Designer	Felyne can appear by scanning in any Monster Hunter amiibo
Another Eden	The Phantom Thieves of Hearts from Atlus' Persona 5 are playable
Assetto Corsa Competizione	Featuring cars and circuits of SRO Motorsports Group events; GT World Challenge Europe (Sprint and Endurance Cup), Intercontinental GT Challenge, GT4 European Series and British GT Championship
Ape Escape 3	A Metal Gear-based minigame
Battle Arena Toshinden	Interplay's Earthworm Jim appears as a selectable character in the PC version
Battletoads/Double Dragon	A game produced by Tradewest/Rare with characters from Technos' Double Dragon series
Bayonetta	Costumes based on Peach and Daisy from Super Mario (with Bowser's limbs for Wicked Weaves), Samus from Metroid, Link from The Legend of Zelda, and Fox from Star Fox are available exclusively in the Wii U and Nintendo Switch versions. Chain Chomp from Super Mario is also available as a weapon
Blade Strangers	Crossover fighting game featuring characters from 1001 Spikes, Azure Striker Gunvolt, The Binding of Isaac, Cave Story, Code of Princess, Doki Doki Poyacchio, Shovel Knight, and Umihara Kawase
Blaster Master Zero	Gunvolt, Ekoro, Shantae and Shovel Knight as downloadable guest characters
BlazBlue: Cross Tag Battle	Crossover fighting game featuring characters from BlazBlue, Persona 4 Arena, Under Night In-Birth, RWBY, Arcana Heart, Senran Kagura, and Akatsuki Blitzkampf
Bloom	Bloom is a modification for the first-person shooter video game Doom II. It merges elements from Doom II and Blood, combining weapons, enemies, and level design elements from both games to create a crossover experience.
Brawlhalla	A fighting game with a large selection of cross-over characters.
Brawlout	Fighting game featuring guest characters from Dead Cells, Guacamelee!, Hyper Light Drifter, and Yooka-Laylee
Cadence of Hyrule: Crypt of the NecroDancer Featuring The Legend of Zelda	Rhythm game set within The Legend of Zelda universe with the gameplay of Crypt of the NecroDancer
Capcom vs. SNK: Millennium Fight 2000	Capcom-produced entries; a series of fighting games featuring characters from Capcom and SNK
Capcom vs. SNK 2: Mark of the Millennium 2001	Capcom-produced entries; a series of fighting games featuring characters from Capcom and SNK
Capy Fine Racing GP	A crossover racing game between Double Fine Productions and Capybara Games only available on floppy disks released during PAX East 2013
Chaos Wars	Aruze's Shadow Hearts, Atlus's Growlanser, Idea Factory's Blazing Souls and Spectral Souls: Resurrection of the Ethereal Empires, and RED Entertainment's Gungrave and Code of the Samurai
Sid Meier's Civilization V	A scenario in the game is based on The Lord of the Rings franchise
Cross Edge	Crossover RPG featuring characters from Idea Factory's Spectral Souls: Resurrection of the Ethereal Empires and Blazing Souls, Capcom's Darkstalkers, Nippon Ichi's Disgaea, and Gust Co. Ltd.'s Atelier Marie: The Alchemist of Salburg, Mana Khemia 2: Fall of Alchemy, and Ar Tonelico: Melody of Elemia
Crystal Crisis	Crossover puzzle game featuring characters from 1001 Spikes, Astro Boy, The Binding of Isaac, Black Jack, Blade Strangers, Cave Story, Code of Princess, Johnny Turbo, The Tempura of the Dead, and Umihara Kawase
Daemon X Machina	Free DLC costumes based on Renton Thurston from Eureka Seven, Suzaku Kururugi from Code Geass: Lelouch of the Rebellion, and Geralt of Rivia and Ciri from The Witcher 3: Wild Hunt
Dead by Daylight	Killers and survivors from multiple horror franchises including Halloween, Left 4 Dead, The Texas Chainsaw Massacre, A Nightmare on Elm Street, Saw, Ash vs. Evil Dead, Scream, Stranger Things, Silent Hill, Resident Evil, and Hellraiser
Dead or Alive 4	Nicole, a Spartan super-soldier created by Bungie, is a playable fighter.
Dead or Alive: Dimensions	Metroid: Other M themed stage with Ridley appearing as a stage hazard while Samus appears at the end of the match
Dead or Alive 5	Akira Yuki, Pai Chan, and Sarah Bryant from the Virtua Fighter series. Jacky Bryant appears on the Ultimate and Last Round versions of the game. Mai Shiranui from Fatal Fury and The King of Fighters is added as DLC for the Last Round version of the game
Dead or Alive 6	Mai Shiranui and Kula Diamond from The King of Fighters
Dead Cells	Weapons, costumes, and small referential areas from Hyper Light Drifter, Shovel Knight, Hollow Knight, Guacamelee, Curse of the Dead Gods, Blasphemous, Skul, Terraria, Slay the Spire, Hotline Miami, Katana Zero, and Risk of Rain 2. Downloadable Content contains additional levels, bosses, costumes, enemies, and weapons from Castlevania.
Diablo III: Eternal Collection	A Nintendo Switch-exclusive armor set based on Ganondorf from The Legend of Zelda: Twilight Princess
Disney Tsum Tsum Festival	A Tsum Tsum version of Pac-Man is playable
Divekick	Johnny Gat from Deep Silver's Saints Row franchise and the Fencer from Nidhogg appear as guest fighters
Diddy Kong Racing	Rare's Banjo and Conker are playable racers, notably appearing before their individual games' releases.
Donkey Kong Country	Sabrewulf from Killer Instinct appears mounted on the wall in the Game Boy Advance port
Donkey Kong Country 2: Diddy's Kong Quest	Chief Thunder from Killer Instinct appears in Cranky Kong's Monkey Museum, as does a Killer Instinct arcade cabinet. Sonic the Hedgehog's shoes and Earthworm Jim's raygun appear in a rather joking manner as it was released during Nintendo's rivalry with Sega though it was later removed in the Game Boy Advance port
Donkey Konga	Theme songs from anime series Doraemon, Case Closed, and Hamtaro and television series Unexpected Gourd Island and Bakuryū Sentai Abaranger are exclusive to the Japanese version
Donkey Konga 2	Theme songs from anime series Naruto, Doraemon, Mobile Suit Gundam Seed, Bobobo-bo Bo-bobo, Heidi, Girl of the Alps, Mazinger Z, Chibi Maruko-chan, Futari wa Pretty Cure, and Kaiketsu Zorori and television series Tokusou Sentai Dekaranger, Aim for the Ace!, and Minimoni's Town Musicians of Bremen are exclusive to the Japanese version
Donkey Konga 3	Theme songs from anime series Dragon Ball Z, Naruto, Case Closed, Fullmetal Alchemist, Mobile Suit Gundam Seed, Atashin'chi, Touch, and Crayon Shin-chan and tracks from Namco games Pac-Man, Mappy, Dig Dug, The Tower of Druaga, Sky Kid, and Xevious are available
Dragalia Lost	The mobile game held special limited-time events featuring characters from Mega Man, Monster Hunter, Fire Emblem Heroes and Persona 5 Strikers.
DreamMix TV World Fighters	Characters from Hudson and Konami's video game series and Takara's toy lines
Dust: An Elysian Tail	Features cameos by various indie game characters from games such as Super Meat Boy, Spelunky, and The Dishwasher: Dead Samurai
Eternal Fighter Zero	Characters from the visual novels Moon, One: Kagayaku Kisetsu e, Kanon and Air
Everybody's Golf 2	Gex is a secret character
Everybody's Golf (2017)	Completing a limited time event called the "Collaboration Cup" rewards the player with costumes based on Level-5 series Professor Layton, Yo-Kai Watch, Ni no Kuni II: Revenant Kingdom, White Knight Chronicles, and Dark Cloud; DLC golf cart designs based on Yo-Kai Watch, Professor Layton, and White Knight Chronicles are available. Chocobo from Final Fantasy can be ridden on.
Fall Guys	A variety of crossover character costumes.
Fatal Frame: Maiden of Black Water	Ayane from Dead or Alive appears in a special episode
Fatal Fury: City of the Wolves	Ken Masters and Chun-Li from Capcom's Street Fighter series are playable via downloadable content.
Fight Night Round 2	Little Mac from Super Punch-Out!!
Fighting Layer	Allen Snider and Blair Dame, created by Arika, were previously in the original Street Fighter EX
Fighting EX Layer	Terry Bogard from Fatal Fury is a playable guest character
Fighting Vipers	The Japanese mascot of Pepsi, Pepsiman, appears in the Japanese release of the Sega Saturn version
Final Fantasy XIII-2	DLC alternate costumes based on the N7 Armor from Mass Effect and Ezio Auditore da Firenze from Assassin's Creed
Final Fantasy XIV	Special events featuring characters from Yo-kai Watch and Monster Hunter: World
Final Fantasy XV	An Assassin's Creed-themed special expansion titled "Assassin's Festival" was released for a limited time to promote Assassin's Creed Origins
Final Fantasy Brave Exvius	Special crossover events with Monster Hunter: Explore, Xenogears, Terra Battle, and Brave Frontier as well as anime series Fullmetal Alchemist
Fortnite Battle Royale	Fortnite's online battle royale has featured a large number of crossovers across video games and many other media.
Forza Motorsport 6	DLC expansion packs feature vehicles from the previous Fast & Furious movies and Hot Wheels versions of cars. The Chryslus Rocket 69 is a vehicle available only to those who also purchased a copy of Fallout 4.
Forza Horizon 3	The Autovista roster featured the Warthog military vehicle from the Halo series, the Quartz Regalia from Final Fantasy XV, and new vehicles in their Hot Wheels form.
Forza Horizon 4	The Warthog returns. A DLC pack from the James Bond series called 'Best of Bond Car Pack' gives access to Q Branch cars including the 1974 AMC Hornet and Citroen 2CV6. A free update adds a new story featuring The Stig from Top Gear with narration from Chris Harris. An expansion adds new vehicles and tracks but in Lego Speed Champions form.
Fruit Ninja	Boards and blades based on Puss in Boots and Ghostbusters
Genshin Impact	Aloy, playable guest character from Horizon Zero Dawn.
Honkai Impact 3rd	Playable character crossover event with Neon Genesis Evangelion and also games from same developers such Genshin Impact and Honkai: Star Rail as well.
Identity V	Survival horror game that hosted a special event featuring characters from Persona 5
Indie Pogo	Features playable characters from Bit.Trip, The Blocks Cometh, Divekick, Downwell, Enter the Gungeon, Freedom Planet, Getting Over It with Bennett Foddy, Jack the Reaper, Leap Day, The Next Penelope, Rivals of Aether, Shovel Knight, Shütshimi, Stardrop Blaster, Super Meat Boy, Teslagrad, Velocispider, VVVVVV and Zorbié, a non-playable boss character from Nefarious, and collectible trophies based on characters from many other indie games. Playable characters from Awesomenauts, Azure Striker Gunvolt, Dust: An Elysian Tail, and Octodad have been announced but not released.
Itadaki Street DS	Characters from Dragon Quest and Mario
Fortune Street	Characters from Dragon Quest and Mario
Itadaki Street: Dragon Quest & Final Fantasy 30th Anniversary	Characters from the Dragon Quest and Final Fantasy franchises
Jet Force Gemini	The Greenwood Village racetrack from Diddy Kong Racing can be unlocked
Just Dance 3	A song based on Super Mario Bros. exclusively for the Wii version
Just Shapes & Beats	Tracks and stages based on the music of Shovel Knight
Kingdom Hearts	A series of games featuring various worlds and characters from multiple Disney and Square-Enix properties.
KOF: Maximum Impact Regulation A	Makoto Mizoguchi from Data East's Fighter's History series
The King of Fighters All Star	Features guest characters from Dead or Alive, Guilty Gear, Seven Knights, Street Fighter, Soulcalibur, Tekken, Virtua Fighter, and WWE.
Killing Floor	Pyro from Team Fortress 2 is a playable character should the player download both games
Konami Wai Wai World	King Kong and Mikey from The Goonies appear
Lego Dimensions	Playable characters and settings from The A-Team, Back to the Future, Doctor Who, E.T. the Extra-Terrestrial, Ghostbusters, Jurassic World, Knight Rider, Mission: Impossible, Portal, The Simpsons and Sonic the Hedgehog franchises and intellectual properties. HAL 9000 from 2001: A Space Odyssey makes a cameo. Using the TARDIS in a certain location allows access to an area from Red Dwarf
Lost Planet 2	Characters from other Capcom games, including Frank West from Dead Rising, and Albert Wesker from Resident Evil, are present in game, in addition to Marcus Fenix and Dominic Santiago from Gears of War.
Lost Saga	Mobile fighting game featuring guest characters from Guilty Gear, BlazBlue, Fatal Fury, The King of Fighters, Samurai Shodown, Beyblade, Order & Chaos Online, Soldier Front, The Great Merchant Online, Sudden Attack, Soul Guardians, Dragon Nest, Red Stone, Priest, Point Blank, Eroge, Line Wind Runner, The God of High School, Indonesia, Changchun Online, Vindictus, Musa Baek Dong-soo, and Trace
Mario Hoops 3-on-3	Characters from Final Fantasy
Mario Sports Mix	Characters from the Dragon Quest and Final Fantasy franchises
Mario Kart 8	Karts and wheels based on three Mercedes-Benz vehicles: the GLA-Class, the W25 Silver Arrow, and the 300 SL Roadster. Mii costumes based on Sonic the Hedgehog, Mega Man, and Pac-Man accessible only through their corresponding amiibo
Super Mario Maker	Multiple costumes for Mario to wear exclusively in the Super Mario Bros. theme including Sonic the Hedgehog, Mega Man, Pac-Man, Felyne from Monster Hunter, Chitoge Kirisaki from the anime series Nisekoi, Sanrio's Hello Kitty and My Melody, Shinya Arino from GameCenter CX, Necky from Japanese video game publication Famitsu, the rock band BABYMETAL, Aardman Animations' Shaun the Sheep, and the Mercedes-Benz GLA-Class
Mario & Luigi: Superstar Saga	Geno from Square Enix's Super Mario RPG: Legend of the Seven Stars
Mario + Rabbids Kingdom Battle	Mario characters and Ubisoft's Rabbids as well as Rabbid versions of certain other Mario characters.
Mario + Rabbids: Sparks of Hope	Mario characters and Ubisoft's Rabbids as well as Rabbid versions of certain other Mario characters.
Mario & Sonic at the Olympic Games	Characters from Super Mario and Sonic the Hedgehog compete in real-world Olympic Games tournaments.
Mario & Sonic at the Olympic Winter Games	Characters from Super Mario and Sonic the Hedgehog compete in real-world Olympic Games tournaments.
Mario & Sonic at the London 2012 Olympic Games	Characters from Super Mario and Sonic the Hedgehog compete in real-world Olympic Games tournaments.
Mario & Sonic at the Sochi 2014 Olympic Winter Games	Characters from Super Mario and Sonic the Hedgehog compete in real-world Olympic Games tournaments.
Mario & Sonic at the Rio 2016 Olympic Games	Characters from Super Mario and Sonic the Hedgehog compete in real-world Olympic Games tournaments.
Mario & Sonic at the Olympic Games Tokyo 2020	Characters from Super Mario and Sonic the Hedgehog compete in real-world Olympic Games tournaments.
Mario Kart Arcade GP	Bandai Namco-developed series of arcade-exclusive Mario Kart games that feature a few of their characters: Pac-Man, Ms. Pac-Man, and Blinky; Mametchi from Tamagotchi; Don-Chan from Taiko no Tatsujin
Mario Kart Arcade GP 2	Bandai Namco-developed series of arcade-exclusive Mario Kart games that feature a few of their characters: Pac-Man, Ms. Pac-Man, and Blinky; Mametchi from Tamagotchi; Don-Chan from Taiko no Tatsujin
Mario Kart Arcade GP DX	Bandai Namco-developed series of arcade-exclusive Mario Kart games that feature a few of their characters: Pac-Man, Ms. Pac-Man, and Blinky; Mametchi from Tamagotchi; Don-Chan from Taiko no Tatsujin
Marvel vs. Capcom	Crossover series with Marvel Comics and characters from multiple Capcom series
Metal Gear Solid 3: Snake Eater	Features a minigame where the player has to catch the apes from Ape Escape
Metal Gear Solid: Peace Walker	Contains missions where Naked Snake can face either Rathalos or Tigrex from Monster Hunter
Minecraft	The game includes skin packs based on: Mass Effect, The Elder Scrolls V: Skyrim, LittleBigPlanet, Super Mario, Tony Hawk's series, Fallout, Castle Crashers, Spelunky, Left 4 Dead, Bit.Trip, Half-Life, Portal, Assassin's Creed, The Simpsons, Doctor Who, Star Wars, Marvel Comics, The Walking Dead, Power Rangers, Magic: The Gathering, Adventure Time, Moana, Final Fantasy XV, The Incredibles, Street Fighter, Pirates of the Caribbean, The Nightmare Before Christmas, Steven Universe, Toy Story, and Ice Age
ModNation Racers	Flo from Progressive Insurance and a Canada-exclusive character based on the Froster cups are playable drivers
Monster Hunter 4	A costume based on Link as he appears in The Legend of Zelda: Skyward Sword
Monster Hunter Generations Ultimate	Toon Link costume and Koroks from The Legend of Zelda: The Wind Waker and Mr. Resetti & Isabelle from Animal Crossing
Monster Hunter Stories	Epona from The Legend of Zelda can be unlocked as a mount
Monster Hunter Diary: Poka Poka Airou Village	Items based on Hello Kitty. A special event quest grants the player a costume of Don-Chan from Taiko no Tatsujin
Monster Hunter: World	The Behemoth from Final Fantasy XIV is a monster that can be fought. Geralt of Rivia is playable in a downloadable side quest inspired by The Witcher 3: Wild Hunt. Aloy is playable in downloadable side quests featuring weapons and gear inspired by Horizon Zero Dawn
Mortal Kombat (2011)	Kratos from Sony's God of War appears as a PS3/PSVita exclusive
Mortal Kombat X	Available as a part of Kombat Pack 1: The Predator; Jason Voorhees from Friday the 13th; A bonus costume for Jax Briggs that features the likeness and voice of Carl Weathers as he appears in Predator as well as a bonus costume for Johnny Cage that resembles the outfit from Commando; Available as a part of Kombat Pack 2: Leatherface from The Texas Chainsaw Massacre; The Xenomorph from Alien
Mortal Kombat 11	As a part of Kombat Pack 1: The T-800 Terminator as he appears in Terminator: Dark Fate with a bonus costume for Sonya Blade that resembles the outfit worn by Sarah Connor; Image Comics' Spawn with bonus costumes based on Conan the Barbarian for Kotal Kahn, Indiana Jones for Erron Black, and Ellen Ripley and a Hellspawn for Jacqui Briggs; As a part of the Mortal Kombat 11: Aftermath expansion: The eponymous RoboCop. A free update also allows an option for him to be the game's announcer.; As a part of Kombat Pack 2: John Rambo from the Rambo franchise.
Mortal Kombat 1	As a part of the Mortal Kombat 1: Khaos Reigns expansion: Ghostface from Scream.; The T-1000 from Terminator 2: Judgment Day.; Conan the Barbarian based on his depiction in the 1982 film of the same name.
MX vs. ATV Unleashed	Crossover between THQ's MX trilogy and Sony's ATV Offroad Fury series, two offroad racing games that solely involve a particular, different vehicle class. Each game features famous, licensed appearances of real-life MX and ATV racers competing against each other.
MX vs. ATV Untamed	Crossover between THQ's MX trilogy and Sony's ATV Offroad Fury series, two offroad racing games that solely involve a particular, different vehicle class. Each game features famous, licensed appearances of real-life MX and ATV racers competing against each other.
MX vs. ATV Reflex	Crossover between THQ's MX trilogy and Sony's ATV Offroad Fury series, two offroad racing games that solely involve a particular, different vehicle class. Each game features famous, licensed appearances of real-life MX and ATV racers competing against each other.
MX vs. ATV Alive	Crossover between THQ's MX trilogy and Sony's ATV Offroad Fury series, two offroad racing games that solely involve a particular, different vehicle class. Each game features famous, licensed appearances of real-life MX and ATV racers competing against each other.
MX vs. ATV Supercross	Crossover between THQ's MX trilogy and Sony's ATV Offroad Fury series, two offroad racing games that solely involve a particular, different vehicle class. Each game features famous, licensed appearances of real-life MX and ATV racers competing against each other.
MX vs. ATV All Out	Crossover between THQ's MX trilogy and Sony's ATV Offroad Fury series, two offroad racing games that solely involve a particular, different vehicle class. Each game features famous, licensed appearances of real-life MX and ATV racers competing against each other.
MX vs. ATV Legends	Crossover between THQ's MX trilogy and Sony's ATV Offroad Fury series, two offroad racing games that solely involve a particular, different vehicle class. Each game features famous, licensed appearances of real-life MX and ATV racers competing against each other.
Namco × Capcom	Action RPG for the PlayStation 2 featuring characters from multiple Namco and Capcom franchises.
NBA Street V3	Mario, Luigi, and Princess Peach are playable exclusively on the Nintendo GameCube version
Ninja Gaiden Z	Beck from Mighty No. 9 appears as a downloadable skin
Ninjala	A collaboration event with Sonic the Hedgehog as a part of Season 2.
Nintendo Badge Arcade	Badges from Monster Hunter and Hello Kitty can be collected
Nitroplus Blasterz: Heroines Infinite Duel	Saber from Fate/stay night, Homura from Senran Kagura, and Heart Aino from Arcana Heart
One Piece: Super Grand Battle! X	Costumes based on Mario, Luigi, Donkey Kong, Yoshi, Samus Aran, Fox McCloud, Marth, Kirby, and the Wii Fit Trainer made available by scanning their corresponding amiibo
Pac-Man Vs.	Mario is the announcer in the GameCube and Nintendo Switch versions
Payday 2	Heists were added taking place in Goat Simulator and Hotline Miami. Characters from John Wick and Hardcore Henry were added as playable characters
PlayStation All-Stars Battle Royale	Playable characters: Dante from DmC: Devil May Cry; Big Daddy from BioShock; Heihachi Mishima from Tekken; Raiden from Metal Gear Rising: Revengeance; Isaac Clarke from Dead Space
Pokémon Conquest	A game that merged the tactical role-playing game style of Koei Tecmo's Nobunaga's Ambition games with the setting and characters of Nintendo's Pokémon.
Poker Night series	Sam & Max, Tycho from Penny Arcade, Strong Bad from Homestar Runner, Heavy from Team Fortress 2, Brock Samson from Venture Bros, Claptrap from Borderlands, Ash Williams from The Evil Dead and GLaDOS from Portal
Power Rangers: Battle for the Grid	Ryu and Chun-Li from Street Fighter
Power Rangers: Legacy Wars	Ryu, Chun-Li, Guile, Cammy, Akuma and M. Bison from Street Fighter
Professor Layton vs. Ace Attorney	Crossover between the Professor Layton and Ace Attorney franchises
Project X Zone	Characters from Capcom, Sega and Namco Bandai
Project X Zone 2	Characters from Capcom, Sega and Namco Bandai. Nintendo's Chrom and Lucina from Fire Emblem Awakening and Fiora of Xenoblade Chronicles make guest appearances with the former two being teammates and the latter being partnered up with KOS-MOS from Xenosaga
Puzzle & Dragons: Super Mario Bros. Edition	A Super Mario-themed Puzzle & Dragons game for the Nintendo 3DS
Rayman Legends	Mario and Luigi costumes exclusively available in the Wii U and Nintendo Switch versions
Ridge Racer (2011)	Hornet car from Daytona USA
Rivals of Aether	Guest characters from Ori and the Blind Forest and Shovel Knight
Rocket League	DLC vehicles based on: The DeLorean Time Machine from the Back to the Future trilogy; The Batmobile from Batman v Superman: Dawn of Justice; Various Hot Wheels models; Dominic Toretto's Dodge Charger from The Fate of the Furious; The Ecto-1 from Ghostbusters; The Jeep Wrangler from Jurassic World: Fallen Kingdom; KITT from Knight Rider; A PS4-exclusive Ice Cream Truck from Twisted Metal; The Battle Bus from Fortnite Battle Royale; Various themed cosmetic items for vehicles are also available based on Portal, Chivalry: Medieval Warfare, Goat Simulator, Euro Truck Simulator, The Witcher, Worms W.M.D., Rick and Morty, El Chapulín Colorado and the NBA for all versions of the game while items based on Halo and Gears of War are exclusive to the Xbox One version and items based on Mario and Luigi are exclusive to the Nintendo Switch version
Runbow	Various independent video game series including Shovel Knight, SteamWorld Dig, Guacamelee!, Sportsball, Scram Kitty and His Buddy on Rails, Bit.Trip, Azure Striker Gunvolt, Teslagrad, Stealth Inc., The Fall, Xeodrifter, Chariot, Mutant Mudds, Hyper Light Drifter, Freedom Planet, and Shantae.
Samurai Shodown (2019)	The Warden from Ubisoft's For Honor, Gonsun Li from Tencent's Honor of Kings, and Baiken from Arc System Works' Guilty Gear are added as DLC.
Samurai Warriors 3	Takamaru from Nintendo's The Mysterious Murasame Castle
Scribblenauts Unlimited	Characters from the Super Mario and the Legend of Zelda series in the Wii U version
Senran Kagura: Estival Versus	Ayane from Dead or Alive and Kan'u, Sonsaku and Ryofu from Ikkitousen series
Shin Megami Tensei III: Nocturne	Dante from Devil May Cry, who is confirmed to return for Nocturne's HD Remaster as DLC.
Shin Megami Tensei: Liberation Dx2	A special collaboration event with Devil May Cry 5
Shoot Many Robots	The Steam version of the game contains Gordon Freeman's suit, turrets from Portal and some items from Team Fortress 2
Shovel Knight	Kratos and the Battletoads appear as console-exclusive boss fights for the PlayStation 4 and Xbox One respectively
Skate 3	Isaac Clarke from Dead Space appears as a playable character
Skylanders: SuperChargers	Donkey Kong and Bowser in the Wii U version; their corresponding figures also work as amiibo for other Nintendo games.
Sly 2: Band of Thieves	TOM from Toonami appears as an unlockable item via cheat code
Smite	Characters from RWBY, TMNT, and Avatar: The Last Airbender & The Legend of Korra appear in crossover events
SNK Heroines: Tag Team Frenzy	Thief Arthur from Million Arthur and a female version of Skullomania from Fighting EX Layer are DLC
SNK vs. Capcom: Card Fighters' Clash	SNK-produced entries; fighting game and collectible card game series featuring characters from Capcom and SNK Corporation
SNK vs. Capcom: The Match of the Millennium	SNK-produced entries; fighting game and collectible card game series featuring characters from Capcom and SNK Corporation
SNK vs. Capcom: Card Fighters 2 Expand Edition	SNK-produced entries; fighting game and collectible card game series featuring characters from Capcom and SNK Corporation
SNK vs. Capcom: SVC Chaos	SNK-produced entries; fighting game and collectible card game series featuring characters from Capcom and SNK Corporation
SNK vs. Capcom: Card Fighters DS	SNK-produced entries; fighting game and collectible card game series featuring characters from Capcom and SNK Corporation
Sonic & Sega All-Stars Racing	Banjo and Kazooie and Xbox 360 Avatars in the Xbox 360 version, and Miis in the Wii version
Sonic & All-Stars Racing Transformed	Playable racers: Danica Patrick; Wreck-It Ralph; Pyro, Spy, and Heavy from Team Fortress 2 (Steam exclusive); Miis and Xbox 360 Avatars; Simon Lane from Yogscast (DLC only)
Sonic Dash	Red, Chuck, & Bomb from Angry Birds Epic, Sanrio's Hello Kitty, My Melody, Chococat and Badtz-Maru, Pac-Man & Ms. Pac-Man, and Bongo the Danimals mascot
Sonic Lost World	The game featured three separate DLC levels that crossed over with three separate franchises for themed levels with aspects of each implemented into the setting and gameplay: Yoshi's Story, The Legend of Zelda, and Nights into Dreams.
Sonic Racing: CrossWorlds	Characters, tracks, and other elements from Minecraft, SpongeBob SquarePants, Pac-Man, Mega Man, Teenage Mutant Ninja Turtles: Mutant Mayhem, and Avatar Legends are available as downloadable content.
Soulcalibur II	Link from The Legend of Zelda in the GameCube version and Spawn of Image Comics in the Xbox and HD versions
Soulcalibur IV	Darth Vader, Starkiller and Yoda from Star Wars; the bonus character Angol Fear is implied to be the cousin of the character Angol Mois from the Sgt. Frog series.
Soulcalibur: Broken Destiny	Kratos from Sony's God of War series
Soulcalibur V	Ezio Auditore from Assassin's Creed
Soulcalibur VI	Geralt of Rivia from The Witcher, 2B from Nier: Automata, and Haohmaru from Samurai Shodown
Splatoon	Special online Splatfest events themed around Dragon Quest, Transformers, SpongeBob SquarePants, Japanese food brands Maruchan and Meiji Dairies, convenience store chain 7-Eleven, and the Kura restaurant chain
Splatoon 2	Special online Splatfest events themed around Rise of the Teenage Mutant Ninja Turtles, Sanrio, McDonald's, clothing brands Nike and Uniqlo, Japanese food brands Meiji Dairies and Ezaki Glico, the Nippon Professional Baseball league, and the Japan Agency for Marine-Earth Science and Technology research institute
SSX on Tour	Mario, Luigi, and Princess Peach are playable exclusively on the Nintendo GameCube version
StarCraft II: Wings of Liberty	Metroids can be seen
Starcraft II: Legacy of the Void	Tauren Space Marine can be spawned using the Konami Code
Starlink: Battle for Atlas	Guest appearances by Star Fox characters exclusive to the Nintendo Switch version
Street Fighter Online: Mouse Generation	Characters from Rival Schools, Louis Cha's novels, Cyborg 009, and president Barack Obama
Taisen Net Gimmick: Capcom & Psikyo All Stars	Japan-exclusive mahjong game released for the Sega Dreamcast featuring characters from Street Fighter and Psikyo games
Japan Sumo Cup ~Yokozuna vs. Street Fighter~	Online rhythm Japanese-exclusive game made to promote the Japan Cup featuring Street Fighter characters and real-life Yokozuna wrestlers
Street Fighter V	Crossover costumes for certain characters based on other characters from Fighting EX Layer
Street Fighter 6	Terry Bogard and Mai Shiranui from SNK's Fatal Fury series are playable via downloadable content.
Street Fighter X Tekken	Street Fighter characters, Tekken characters, Cole MacGrath from Sucker Punch's inFamous series, Capcom's Mega Man, Namco's Pac-Man and Sony's mascots Toro and Kuro
Super Bomberman R	Console-exclusive guest characters Master Chief, Ratchet & Clank, and P-Body; also features WWE wrestler Xavier Woods as a playable character
Super Crate Box	Characters from Canabalt, Spelunky and Super Meat Boy
Super Meat Boy	Various indie game characters, such as Steve from Minecraft, Tim from Braid, and Gish; the Headcrab from Half-Life is playable in the Steam version
Super Monkey Ball Banana Mania	Sanrio's Hello Kitty and Suezo from Koei Tecmo's Monster Rancher are playable via downloadable content.
Super Smash Bros. series	Includes playable characters from Metal Gear, Sonic the Hedgehog, Mega Man, Pac-Man, Street Fighter, Final Fantasy VII, Bayonetta, Castlevania, Persona 5, Dragon Quest, Banjo-Kazooie, Fatal Fury, Minecraft, Tekken, and Kingdom Hearts. Additional franchises are represented in the form of collectible trophies and Spirits, music tracks, summonable Assist Trophies, and Mii Fighter costumes.
Tatsunoko vs. Capcom	Characters from various Capcom and Tatsunoko Production franchises
Taiko no Tatsujin: Drum 'n' Fun!	Songs from Super Mario Odyssey, Splatoon 2, Kirby's Return to Dream Land, Pokémon: Let's Go! Pikachu and Let's Go! Eevee, Teddy Together, and Undertale
Tekken Tag Tournament 2	The Wii U version features a mode that uses power-ups from Super Mario as well as character costumes based on Super Mario, The Legend of Zelda, Metroid, Star Fox, and F-Zero
Tekken 7	Akuma from Street Fighter, Geese Howard from Fatal Fury, Noctis Lucis Caelum from Final Fantasy XV, and Negan from The Walking Dead
Tokyo Mirage Sessions ♯FE	Shin Megami Tensei and Fire Emblem
Tom Clancy's Ghost Recon Wildlands	A special limited-time event lets players hunt down The Predator along with gear and weapons based on the films
Tom Clancy's Ghost Recon Breakpoint	A special event featuring The T-800 Terminator
Tony Hawk's Pro Skater 2	Spider-Man from Marvel Comics
Tony Hawk's Pro Skater 3	Darth Maul from Star Wars, Wolverine from Marvel Comics, Kelly Slater and Doomguy from Doom
Tony Hawk's Pro Skater 4	Iron Maiden's mascot Eddie the Head, and Jango Fett from Star Wars
Tony Hawk's Pro Skater 5	Lil Wayne and King Graham from King's Quest. Tyler, the Creator and the Teenage Mutant Ninja Turtles were added in a free update.
Tony Hawk's Underground	Iron Man from Marvel Comics and a C.H.U.D. appears under the name T.H.U.D.
Tony Hawk's Underground 2	Shrek from the Shrek films and a soldier from Call of Duty
Trinity Universe	Characters from the Disgaea and Atelier series
Under Night In-Birth	Akatsuki from SUBTLE STYLE's Akatsuki Blitzkampf appears in Under Night In-Birth EXE: Late and updated versions
Vampire Survivors	Downloadable content expansions have added characters, weapons, and elements from Among Us, Contra, Castlevania, and SaGa: Emerald Beyond
Wario Blast: Featuring Bomberman!	Wario and Bomberman
Warriors Orochi 3 Ultimate	Sophitia from Soulcalibur
The Wonderful 101	Bayonetta, Jeanne and Rodin appears as Wonderful Ones from the game Bayonetta
Yo-kai Watch 2	Don-Chan from Taiko no Tatsujin is an available Yo-kai
Yo-kai Watch 3	Don-Chan from Taiko no Tatsujin is an available Yo-kai
Yo-kai Watch: Wibble Wobble	Multiple characters from the mainline Final Fantasy games, Monster Strike, Sanrio, Mr. Necky from Japanese video game publication Famitsu, The T-800 from The Terminator, and anime series Case Closed, Magi: The Labyrinth of Magic, The Seven Deadly Sins, and GeGeGe no Kitarō appear as available Yo-kai
Yooka-Laylee	Shovel Knight appears in a cameo appearance

== Comic book/video game crossovers ==
Video games that have comic book franchise characters encountering or facing off against other comic book franchise characters or third-party video game characters in a crossover video game or as a guest character in a third-party video game include:

Video game	Featuring
Soulcalibur II	Spawn of Image Comics in the Xbox and HD versions
Tekken 7	Negan from Image Comics' The Walking Dead appears as a DLC character in the console versions
Marvel Super Heroes	Darkstalkers' Anita
X-Men: Children of the Atom	Akuma from Street Fighter
Marvel vs. Capcom	Crossover series featuring characters from various Capcom and Marvel Comics series
Jump Force	A fighting game featuring characters from various manga series serialized in Shueisha's anthology magazine Weekly Shōnen Jump
Fortnite	In-game content such as characters from Marvel Comics and DC Comics, alongside tie-in comics from the two.
Iron Man and X-O Manowar in Heavy Metal	Marvel's Iron Man and Valiant's X-O Manowar
Revenge of Shinobi	Batman and Spider-Man are bosses
Teenage Mutant Ninja Turtles: Smash-Up	Ubisoft's Rabbids on the Wii version
Tony Hawk's Pro Skater 5	The Teenage Mutant Ninja Turtles appear as playable characters. Various Marvel Comics characters appear throughout the series.
Injustice: Gods Among Us	Scorpion from Mortal Kombat
Injustice 2	Hellboy, Teenage Mutant Ninja Turtles, and Raiden and Sub-Zero from Mortal Kombat
The King of Fighters All Star	Features guest characters from Hideaki Sorachi's Gin Tama and Nakaba Suzuki's The Seven Deadly Sins
Fatal Fury: City of the Wolves	Kenshiro from Fist of the North Star is playable via downloadable content.
Mortal Kombat vs. DC Universe	A major crossover game that features characters from Mortal Kombat and DC Comics superheroes.
Mortal Kombat 11	DC Comics' Joker and Image Comic's Spawn are a part of DLC Kombat Pack 1. Bonus costumes based on other Harley Quinn for Cassie Cage, Killer Croc for Baraka, Catwoman for Kitana, Darkseid for Geras, The Batman Who Laughs for Noob Saibot, and a Hellspawn for Jacqui Briggs are also available through the Kombat Pack
Mortal Kombat 1	As a part of Kombat Pack 1: Image Comics' Omni-Man, with J. K. Simmons reprising his role from the animated adaptation of Invincible; Charlton and DC's Peacemaker based on his depiction in the DC Extended Universe; Dynamite Entertainment's Homelander based on his appearance in the television series adaptation of The Boys
Scribblenauts Unmasked: A DC Comics Adventure	
