= Gunvolt =

- Developer: Inti Creates
- Publisher: Inti Creates
- First release: Azure Striker Gunvolt; 20 August 2014
- Latest release: Gunvolt Chronicles: Luminous Avenger iX 1+2 Dual Collection; 9 July 2026

Gunvolt (Note: Japanese: ガンヴォルト) is an action video game franchise developed by Inti Creates. It is set in the near future where a group of humans known as Adepts developed a superpower called Septima, and centers around conflicts between non-superpowered humans and Adepts. The series follows Gunvolt as the major protagonist, a former assassin who turned rogue against his employer, but other games star different protagonists.

The first game in the series, Azure Striker Gunvolt, was released on 20 August 2014 for the Nintendo 3DS. It was followed by two main sequels, Azure Striker Gunvolt 2 (2016) and Azure Striker Gunvolt 3 (2022). Mighty Gunvolt, a side game featuring crossover with Mighty No. 9 and other properties, was released on the same day as Azure Striker Gunvolt, and was followed by Mighty Gunvolt Burst (2017). Gunvolt Chronicles: Luminous Avenger iX, a spin-off starring Copen from Azure Striker Gunvolt 2, was released in 2019 and followed by two sequels.

== Video games ==
Release timeline
2014	Azure Striker Gunvolt
2014	Mighty Gunvolt
2015	Azure Striker Gunvolt DOS
2016	Azure Striker Gunvolt 2
2017	Mighty Gunvolt Burst
2018
2019	Gunvolt Chronicles: Luminous Avenger iX
2020–2021
2022	Gunvolt Chronicles: Luminous Avenger iX 2
2022	Azure Striker Gunvolt 3
2023
2024	Gunvolt Records Cychronicle
2025	Azure Striker Gunvolt Trilogy Enhanced
2026	Gunvolt Chronicles: Luminous Avenger iX 1+2 Dual Collection
TBA	Gunvolt Chronicles: Luminous Avenger iX 3

Azure Striker Gunvolt is a 2014 action game first developed and released for the Nintendo 3DS. It was produced by Keiji Inafune, a former Capcom developer and creator of the Mega Man series. A side game, Mighty Gunvolt was released in 2014. The game is a crossover with Mighty No. 9.

A sequel, Azure Striker Gunvolt 2, was released in 2016. A sequel to Mighty Gunvolt was announced as Mighty Gunvolt Burst and released in 2017.

A spin-off featuring Copen, a co-protagonist from Azure Striker Gunvolt 2, was released in 2019. In 2022, Gunvolt Chronicles: Luminous Avenger iX 2, a sequel to Copen's game, and Azure Striker Gunvolt 3, a main sequel featuring a new protagonist Kirin, were both released.

Gunvolt Records Cychronicle, a rhythm game centered on the songstresses, was released in 2024.

== In other media ==
=== Anime ===
- Gunvolt
- Created by: Yoshihisa Tsuda
- Original video animation
- Directed by: Yoshinori Odaka
- Produced by: Yoshinori Odaka
- Written by: Shigeru Murakoshi
- Studio: LandQ Studios
- Released: February 9, 2017

An original video anime adaptation was announced by Inti Creates at the Anime Expo 2016 convention in Los Angeles, California on July 3, 2016. The series was directed and produced by Yoshinori Odaka, with animation by LandQ Studios, scripts written by Shigeru Murakoshi, and character designs by Masakazu Sunagawa. It was planned for a 2016 release, but it was delayed to 2017, eventually being released worldwide on the Nintendo eShop on February 9, 2017, along with an English dubbed version. Peter von Gomm did the English dub of the character Copen.
