= Umihara Kawase (video game) =

1994 video game

- Super Famicom box art featuring the titular character.
- Developer: TNN/NHK SC (Note: Windows port developed by Studio Saizensen.)
- Publishers: TNN; Komodo Games
- Designer: Kiyoshi Sakai
- Composers: Masahito Nakano; Atsuhiro Motoyama; Shinji Tachikawa
- Platforms: Super Famicom, Microsoft Windows
- Release: Super Famicom: JP: December 23, 1994; Windows: WW: November 2, 2015
- Genre: Platformer
- Mode: Single-player

Umihara Kawase (Note: Umihara Kawase (Japanese: 海腹川背, Hepburn: Umihara Kawase)) is a 1994 platformer developed and published by Japanese company TNN. It is the inaugural game in the Umihara Kawase series. It was first released in 1994 for the Super Famicom.

== Gameplay ==
Super Famicom version screenshot

Umihara Kawase is a 2D side-scrolling platformer where the player controls the titular character, Umihara Kawase. (Note: Her surname is Umihara and her given name Kawase; Umihara comes first because of the conventions of Japanese name order.) The player navigates "fields", the game's levels, and completes it by entering one of its available exits. The player makes use of Kawase's fishing line, using it as a grappling hook to overcome hazards.

The game contains a total of 49 fields of which four are exit fields and six are boss fields. The game makes use of colour palette of the Super Famicom for digitized photographic backgrounds. The game permits saving speedruns, establishing such play as a principal feature of the series.

The game has a 30-minute time limit invisible to the player. When the timer runs out before reaching any end fields, the next exit always transports Kawase to the fixed single level (Field 28) regardless of the player's progress, after which the game ends.

== Development ==
Umihara Kawase started as one of the demos on the X68000, which the programmer Kiyoshi Sakai created to pitch it to the character designer Toshinobu Kondo. A series of showcase videos based on the prototype was later uploaded by Sakai on his YouTube channel in 2018.

The team behind the original Super Famicom version was composed of half a dozen developers, but Sakai was in charge of most of the development by himself, who designed, directed and programmed the game. While Sakai had worked on plenty of high-profile video games – including Euphory (1987), Boomer's Adventure in ASMIK World (1989), the home port of Cameltry (1989), and Mamono Hunter Yōko: Dai 7 no Keishō (1991) – Umihara Kawase was his first top-to-bottom project.

Umihara Kawase was inspired by arcade platformers like Donkey Kong (1981) and Roc'n Rope (1983), where the player can see the whole stage in one screen. Sakai denied rumors that the game's swinging mechanics were taken from Capcom's arcade game Bionic Commando (1987), which he was only vaguely familiar with at the time, but he was still aware of it before creating Umihara Kawase and regarded it as a possible inspiration.

== Release ==
Umihara Kawase was first released on the Super Famicom in Japan on December 23, 1994.

The Microsoft Windows version was published by Agatsuma Entertainment on November 2, 2015. It was developed by Studio Saizensen, a studio founded by the series character designer Toshinobu Kondo. The slowdown from the Super Famicom version is no longer present with the addition of a practice mode. It is a worldwide release available through Steam and supports Steam Cloud saves, leaderboards and Steam Workshop access. On November 24, the day the Windows version of Umihara Kawase Shun made its worldwide debut, Agatsuma Entertainment bundled the first three games in the series on Steam into Umihara Kawase Trilogy, which can be bought at reduced price together. In January 2016, every game in the trilogy was delisted from Steam after Agatsuma Entertainment closed its doors the previous month. The publishing rights to the series was promptly acquired by Degica, which relisted the trilogy to Steam on January 28.

The Super Famicom version was made available in Japan for the Nintendo Classics service on May 26, 2022.

== Reception ==
Reception

Review score
Publication	Score
Famitsu	7/10, 7/10, 7/10, 7/10

On release, the reviewers in Famitsu compared it to Bionic Commando on the Nintendo Entertainment System, and praised its complex utility of fishing line in gameplay.

The Super Famicom version of the game was not released in North America and Europe at the time, having remained obscure in the west since. A few journalists noted they never learned about the game and its series until it's featured in an episode of the gaming variety show GameCenter CX, which was aired on June 7, 2006.

== Legacy ==
Umihara Kawase spawned a video game series of the same name that would release games over years. The first sequel, Umihara Kawase Shun, was released for the PlayStation in 1997, developed by the same development team.

Toshinobu Kondo later established Studio Saizensen. The company occasionally featured crossover appearance of Kawase in its games, including Blade Strangers (2018).
