= Azure Striker Gunvolt 3 =

- Cover art depicting Kirin (bottom), along with Gunvolt (top middle) and Lumen (top right)
- Developer: Inti Creates
- Publisher: Inti Creates
- Directors: Yoshihisa Tsuda; Hiroki Miyazawa
- Producer: Takuya Aizu
- Programmers: Hironori Ikeda; Yuji Murata
- Artists: Munehiro Araki; Yusuke Ootsu
- Writers: Nobuo Yoshimoto; Hiroki Miyazawa
- Composers: Ippo Yamada; Ryo Kawakami
- Series: Gunvolt
- Platforms: Nintendo Switch; PlayStation 4; PlayStation 5; Windows; Xbox One; Xbox Series X/S
- Release: Nintendo Switch: WW: 28 July 2022; Xbox One, Xbox Series X/S: WW: 2 August 2022; Windows: WW: 13 October 2022; PlayStation 4, PlayStation 5: WW: 15 December 2022
- Genres: Action, platform
- Mode: Single-player

Azure Striker Gunvolt 3 (Note: Japanese: 蒼き雷霆(アームドブルー)ガンヴォルト鎖環(ギブス), Hepburn: Amudo Burū Ganvoruto Gibusu) is a 2022 action-platformer developed and published by Inti Creates. It is the third main game in the Gunvolt series, and chronologically set after Azure Striker Gunvolt 2. It was initially released on 28 July 2022 for the Nintendo Switch, with ports for PlayStation 4, PlayStation 5, Windows, Xbox One, and Xbox Series X/S releasing separately throughout the year. Set in the near-future resided by humans with superpowers, the story concerns Kirin, a battle priestess on her mission to stop a new threat with aids from Gunvolt, the previous protagonist of the series.

The game was included in Azure Striker Gunvolt Trilogy Enhanced, a 2025 compilation that contains Azure Striker Gunvolt and Gunvolt 2. It was released for the Nintendo Switch, PlayStation 5, and Windows.

== Gameplay ==
Azure Striker Gunvolt 3 is a side-scrolling action platformer. The game features two playable characters, Kirin and Gunvolt. The player controls Kirin by default, but Gunvolt can tag in for her temporarily. Similar to Copen in Azure Striker Gunvolt 2, Kirin uses a close-range weapon, and she can throw talismans on her enemies to "mark" them and make them vulnerable to her katana.

== Development and release ==
Azure Striker Gunvolt 3 was directed by Yoshihisa Tsuda. Keiji Inafune, the CCO of Level-5 Comcept, returned as action supervisor. Hiroki Miyazawa, director of the Bloodstained: Curse of the Moon series, assisted the project as action director. The game featured an English cast for the first time in series history. Voice actors include Sean Chiplock, Kelly Baskin, Ryan Colt Levy, and Diana Garnet.

Inti Creates announced Azure Striker Gunvolt 3 on 27 June 2020 during the BitSummit online event. The game was originally announced for the Nintendo Switch, and the new character Kirin was revealed. The demo first became publicly playable at the Digital Game Xpo on 29 November.

Azure Striker Gunvolt 3 was launched for Nintendo Switch on 28 July 2022. The Xbox Series X/S and Xbox One ports were released on 2 August. It was ported to Windows on 13 October, and PlayStation 4 and PlayStation 5 on 15 December.

Free content updates were provided monthly from August to December 2022, adding new playable characters, bosses, and game modes. The update was concluded with an additional story content, "Epilogue ATEMS".

== Reception ==
Reception

Aggregate scores
Aggregator	Score
Metacritic	NS: 80/100
OpenCritic	83%

Review scores
Publication	Score
Destructoid	8.5/10
Famitsu	33/40
Nintendo Life	8/10
Nintendo World Report	8/10
NF Magazine	8.5/10

Azure Striker Gunvolt 3 received "generally favorable" reviews according to review aggregator website Metacritic. 83% of the critics recommended the game according to OpenCritic.

== Future ==
In 2023, Inti Creates CEO Takuya Aizu said the developer would take a break from the series after Gunvolt 3. In March 2025, the developer announced Azure Striker Gunvolt Trilogy Enhanced, an updated compilation of the three Azure Striker Gunvolt main games with enhancements and bonus content. It was released on 24 July for Nintendo Switch, PlayStation 5, and Windows.
