= Gunvolt Chronicles: Luminous Avenger iX =

- Developer: Inti Creates
- Publisher: Inti Creates
- Series: Gunvolt
- Platforms: Nintendo Switch; PlayStation 4; Windows; Xbox One
- Release: PS4, Switch, Windows: WW: 26 September 2019; Xbox One: WW: 19 December 2019
- Genre: Action
- Mode: Single-player

Gunvolt Chronicles: Luminous Avenger iX (Note: Japanese: 白き鋼鉄のＸ(イクス) THE OUT OF GUNVOLT) is a 2019 action game developed and published by Inti Creates. The game is a sequel to Azure Striker Gunvolt (2014), starring Copen from Azure Striker Gunvolt 2 (2016), but does not continue the storyline from the latter, set in a parallel universe with a new plot focusing on Copon's mission to defeat the superpowered humans that oppress the common folk.

The game was released on 26 September 2019 for Nintendo Switch, PlayStation 4, Windows, and Xbox One. It received generally positive reviews. It was followed by Gunvolt Chronicles: Luminous Avenger iX 2 (2022), and will be succeeded by upcoming game Gunvolt Chronicles: Luminous Avenger iX 3. It was re-released as part of the 2026 compilation Gunvolt Chronicles: Luminous Avenger iX 1+2 Dual Collection.

== Plot ==
In the near future, the majority of humanity have become "Adepts", people who possess supernatural powers known as Septimas. Humans who do not have Septimas are labelled "Minos" and get executed by Sumeragi, a national organization. Copen objects to Sumeragi's methods and tries to defend the humans.

== Gameplay ==
Gunvolt Chronicles: Luminous Avenger iX is a side-scrolling action game that plays similarly to the Mega Man series. The player controls Copen, who can attack enemies with a blaster weapon and SP Skill abilities. Copen is alongside his AI partner Lola, who allows him to use unlockable EX Weapons. An important element of Copen's offensive moves is the air combo system. Copen can lock on an enemy by dashing into them, which will open for a combination of homing shots.

== Development and release ==
Gunvolt Chronicles: Luminous Avenger iX was developed by Inti Creates. It was announced in May 2018 at BitSummit. The game was released on 26 September 2019 for Nintendo Switch, PlayStation 4, and Windows. Limited Run Games published physical copies of the standard edition and collector's edition for Nintendo Switch and PlayStation 4.

== Reception ==
Reception

Aggregate scores
Aggregator	Score
Metacritic	81/100
OpenCritic	88%

Review scores
Publication	Score
Destructoid	8/10
Nintendo Life	8/10
Nintendo World Report	8.5/10
Nintendo Force	8.5/10

Gunvolt Chronicles: Luminous Avenger iX received "generally favorable" reviews for the Nintendo Switch version according to review aggregator Metacritic. 88% of the critics recommended the game according to OpenCritic.

== Sequels ==
The game was followed by Gunvolt Chronicles: Luminous Avenger iX 2 and Gunvolt Chronicles: Luminous Avenger iX 3. It was included the compilation Gunvolt Chronicles: Luminous Avenger iX 1+2 Dual Collection with Luminous Avenger iX 2. The compilation was released on 9 July 2026 for PlayStation 5, Nintendo Switch, Nintendo Switch 2, and Windows.
