= Blade Strangers =

2018 video game

- Developer: Studio Saizensen
- Publishers: WW: Nicalis; JP: Pikii
- Director: Toshinobu Kondo
- Producer: Tyrone Rodriguez
- Composer: Ridiculon
- Platforms: Arcade; Nintendo Switch; PlayStation 4; Microsoft Windows
- Release: JP: August 30, 2018; NA: August 28, 2018; EU: August 28, 2018
- Genre: Fighting
- Modes: Single-player, multiplayer

Blade Strangers (Note: Japanese: ブレード ストレンジャーズ) is a 2D crossover fighting game developed by Studio Saizensen and published by Nicalis, released on PlayStation 4, Nintendo Switch and Microsoft Windows via Steam in August 2018, as well as a Japanese arcade release. It features one-on-one combat between several characters from various independent video game franchises.

== Gameplay ==
Gameplay screenshot of Kawase using a super move to attack Curly Brace

Gameplay in Blade Strangers takes place on a 2D plane and features two characters battling one another until one character's health is depleted, causing them to lose the match. The game avoids the use of more complex directional inputs seen in other fighting games; instead, players perform various attacks and special moves by pressing a single directional input in combination with one or more of the four attack buttons, similar to the Super Smash Bros. series. During battle, players can build their super meter by dealing or receiving damage, which can be used to enhance their special moves or perform powerful super attacks. When a player character's health depletes below a certain level, the player is able to activate a temporary "Heat Up!" state. This can only be used once per round for a short time, and will increase the player character's attack speed while preventing opponents from interrupting the player's attacks.

Blade Strangers offers a single-player story mode, with characters interacting with one another while progressing through a tournament ladder, along with arcade, survival, training and challenge modes. The game also supports local and online multiplayer battles.

=== Characters ===
The launch roster of Blade Strangers featured 12 playable characters drawn from six different independent game franchises, primarily other Studio Saizensen and Nicalis works, along with two original characters for a total roster of 14. Three additional characters were added via a free update on the game's first anniversary, bringing the total to 17. Each character also receives a stage based on their game of origin.

- Aban (1001 Spikes) (Note: Post-launch character)
- Ali (Code of Princess)
- Curly Brace (Cave Story)
- Emiko (Umihara Kawase)
- Gunvolt (Azure Striker Gunvolt)
- Helen (original)
- Isaac (The Binding of Isaac)
- Kawase (Umihara Kawase)
- Lina (original)
- Liongate (Code of Princess)
- Master T (Code of Princess)
- Noko (Umihara Kawase)
- Piaa (Doki Doki Poyacchio)
- Quote (Cave Story)
- Shovel Knight (Shovel Knight)
- Solange (Code of Princess)
- Summer Kawase (Umihara Kawase)

== Plot ==
In the world of Blade Strangers, every universe is one of many simulations being generated by an interdimensional network of servers. These simulations are overseen by the goddess Exiva and her Motes, a group of sentient computers, and protected by their champions, the Blade Strangers. A cybernetic being known as Lina appears and begins consuming the servers' data, wiping out whole worlds and defeating all of the Blade Strangers. To protect the universe, the motes summon heroes from worlds Lina has not yet reached, altering their memories to make them believe they are participating in a fighting tournament. The one left standing will be named the new Blade Stranger in the hopes of awakening their power and allowing them to defeat Lina.

== Development ==
Blade Strangers was announced on June 12, 2017, during E3 2017. New characters were revealed gradually in the months leading up to the game's release. The game was initially developed independently by Studio Saizensen, and primarily featured characters from games they had previously created. When Nicalis became the game's publisher, they offered additional suggestions for potential playable characters, and worked with each character's rights holders to include them in the roster.

The game's character sprites were created by designing three-dimensional models for each fighter, rendering them in individual animation frames, then rasterizing those frames and performing additional cleanup by 2D artists. According to director Toshinobu Kondo, the development team initially struggled to maintain balance due to some characters possessing weapons that gave them extra advantages. The decision to simplify player inputs was due to a desire to make the game more accessible to those who do not normally play fighting games, as well as to reduce the data transfer and resulting input lag during online multiplayer battles. The game's soundtrack was composed and performed by American rock band Ridiculon, with additional vocals performed by Siobhan Magnus.

For the first anniversary of the game's launch, a free in-game update was released that made several changes, including improved graphics, faster gameplay speed, a full rebalancing of the character roster, and three additional playable characters.

== Reception ==
Reception

Aggregate score
Aggregator	Score
Metacritic	NS: 75/100; PS4: 75/100

Review scores
Publication	Score
Destructoid	7/10
Nintendo Life	7/10
Pocket Gamer	4/5

== See also ==
- Crystal Crisis, another Nicalis crossover title developed concurrently with Blade Strangers
- Blade Arcus from Shining, a 2014 fighting game developed by Studio Saizensen, featuring characters from Sega's Shining series
