= Crystal Crisis =

2019 puzzle game

- Cover art, featuring the game's playable character roster
- Developer: Nicalis
- Publishers: WW: Nicalis; JP: Pikii
- Director: Chris Rausch
- Programmers: Jeremy Stevens; John Goodrich
- Artist: Louis Valladares
- Composers: UMI☆KUUN; Toshihiro Ogihara
- Platforms: Nintendo Switch; PlayStation 4; Microsoft Windows
- Release: Nintendo Switch: JP: August 1, 2019; NA: May 28, 2019; EU: May 28, 2019; PlayStation 4: JP: August 1, 2019; NA: June 18, 2019; EU: June 19, 2019; Microsoft Windows: WW: July 31, 2019
- Genres: Tile-matching, fighting
- Modes: Single-player, multiplayer

Crystal Crisis is a competitive tile-matching puzzle video game developed and published by Nicalis, released on Nintendo Switch, PlayStation 4 and Microsoft Windows via Steam in 2019. It is inspired by Capcom's Super Puzzle Fighter II Turbo and features crossover appearances by several characters from other Nicalis video games, as well as additional guest characters from companies such as Tezuka Productions.

== Gameplay ==
The gameplay in Crystal Crisis is heavily inspired by Capcom's Super Puzzle Fighter II Turbo. Like Puzzle Fighter, players control sets of two blocks ("crystals" in game parlance) that fall into a pit-like field (fifteen crystals tall by six crystals wide). Touching a crystal with a Spark Crystal of the same color will cause all adjacent crystals of that color to break and be removed from the field. The more crystals the player is able to break at once or in sequence, the greater number of Countdown Crystals that will appear on an opponent's field, which can only be turned to normal crystals and broken after a certain number of crystals have been dropped. A Poly-Crystal will also appear occasionally, which will instantly break all crystals of whatever color it is dropped on. If the fourth column of a player's field is completely filled, the game ends and that player loses the battle. Unlike Puzzle Fighter, Crystal Crisis features "edge-wrapping", allowing crystals to press past the sides of the play field and instantly move from the rightmost column to the leftmost column or vice versa. This can also be used to bisect a pair of falling crystals, allowing one crystal to fall on each side of the field.

Each character in Crystal Crisis has a unique pattern of Countdown Crystals that they will drop on opponents after performing a crystal break. Breaking crystals will also fill the player's Burst Meter; when filled, the player can activate a Crystal Burst ability. There are two types of Crystal Bursts: an Attack Burst, which can be used to interfere with the opponent's play field, and a Defense Burst, which can be used to assist the player with clearing their own field. The effects of each Crystal Burst vary based on the player's chosen character; for example, Astro Boy's Attack Burst shifts all of the opponent's crystals to the right, while his Defense Burst allows the player to rotate clusters of four crystals on their field. Some characters' Burst Meters can store up to three levels of power, with the effectiveness of the Crystal Burst being increased the more of their meter they spend at once, while others can only use their Crystal Burst by expending their entire meter.

Crystal Crisis offers a single-player story mode, in which the power of the Red Crystal from Cave Story causes the boundaries between worlds to break down, and various heroes race to find and destroy the crystal before a group of villains can use it for their own evil purposes. Each battle in the story mode allows players to choose between one of two predetermined playable characters, with branching progression based on which characters they choose for each battle, though every route culminates in a battle with the game's final boss, the Undead Core from Cave Story. The game also features single-player arcade and survival modes, a training mode, and both local and online multiplayer battles. Several alternate play styles are available as well, including "Inline", which removes Spark Crystals and functions similarly to a "match-three" puzzle game; "Tag Team", which allows players to switch between two characters in the middle of a battle; and "Memory", which turns all crystals black as soon as they are dropped and challenges players to remember their colors. Additionally, the game features accessibility options for colorblind players, including the ability to set custom colors for each of the four crystals.

=== Characters ===
Crystal Crisis features 20 playable characters drawn from different media, primarily other video games published by Nicalis. Three characters originate from unannounced Nicalis titles. Each character also has an accompanying stage and character theme based on those of their original work.

- Aban (1001 Spikes)
- Akuji (Akuji the Demon)
- Astro Boy (Astro Boy)
- Ballos (Cave Story)
- Black Jack (Black Jack)
- Curly Brace (Cave Story)
- Elise (unnanounced Nicalis title)
- Helen (Blade Strangers)
- Hunter (unnanounced Nicalis title)
- Isaac (The Binding of Isaac)
- Jim (1001 Spikes)
- Johnny Turbo (Johnny Turbo)
- Kawase (Umihara Kawase)
- Knight (Hydra Castle Labyrinth)
- Ninja (unnanounced Nicalis title)
- Quote (Cave Story)
- Solange (Code of Princess)
- Thompson (The Tempura of the Dead)
- Tina (1001 Spikes)
- Zombie (The Tempura of the Dead)

== Development ==
The idea for Crystal Crisis originated from Nicalis president Tyrone Rodriguez, who sought to create a new competitive puzzle game. During development, the initial roster of the game featured eight playable characters from various Nicalis titles, which expanded to twelve as the team added characters from other games the company was developing simultaneously. Nicalis also reached out to Studio Saizensen, whom the company had worked with on previous titles, and Tezuka Productions for use of their characters, along with the creators of other independent Japanese games, bringing the total roster to nineteen.

Crystal Crisis was first announced in May 2018 as a Nintendo Switch exclusive planned for release later that same year. In December 2018, a PlayStation 4 version of the game was announced alongside a delay of the game, now planned for release on April 23, 2019. During this time, professional fighting game player Justin Wong was brought on to the team as a consultant to help playtest the game and balance the characters. In January 2019, it was announced that the game would be delayed a second time until May 28, 2019 in order to add additional features, including new playable character Kawase Umihara and in-game narration by Peter Cullen. The game's soundtrack was arranged by Japanese singer-songwriter UMI☆KUUN, who also wrote and performed the game's opening and ending themes, "Red Fire" and "It's A Beautiful Day" respectively. In July 2021, the game was updated to support cross-platform play between the Switch and PC ports of the game.

== Reception ==
Reception

Aggregate scores
Aggregator	Score
Metacritic	NS: 79/100
OpenCritic	58% recommend

Review scores
Publication	Score
Destructoid	8/10
Nintendo Life	7/10

Crystal Crisis received an average score of 79/100 from the review aggregation website Metacritic, indicating generally favorable reception. Fellow review aggregator OpenCritic assessed that the game received strong approval, being recommended by 58% of critics.

== See also ==
- Blade Strangers, another Nicalis crossover title developed concurrently with Crystal Crisis
