= Umihana =

Umihana is a feminine given name of Bosnian origin.

== People with the given name ==
- Umihana Čuvidina (c. 1794 – c. 1870), Bosnian poet of Ottoman times
- Umihana Rasovic (born 1986), Swedish politician of Bosniak origin

== See also ==
- Umihara
