= Mighty Gunvolt =

2014 platform game

- Developer: Inti Creates
- Publisher: Inti Creates
- Director: Ryota Ito
- Producer: Takuya Aizu
- Composers: Ippo Yamada; Ryo Kawakami
- Platforms: Nintendo 3DS, PlayStation 4, PlayStation Vita, Microsoft Windows, Nintendo Switch
- Release: Nintendo 3DS: JP: August 20, 2014; NA: August 29, 2014; PAL: April 2, 2015; PS4, PlayStation Vita: JP: August 6, 2015; Microsoft Windows: WW: September 29, 2015; Nintendo Switch: JP: August 20, 2024
- Genre: Platform
- Mode: Single-player

Mighty Gunvolt is a platform game developed and published by Inti Creates. The game is a spin-off accompaniment to Inti Creates' Azure Striker Gunvolt game featuring characters from Mighty No. 9 and Gal*Gun.

The game was released for the Nintendo 3DS in Japan and North America in August 2014, and later in PAL regions in April 2015. A port for PlayStation 4 and PlayStation Vita, titled Gal Gunvolt, was released in Japan in August 2015. A version of the original Mighty Gunvolt was released for Microsoft Windows, and was available for free to purchasers of Azure Striker Gunvolt within the first month of its release. A version of the original for the Nintendo Switch was bundled with its sequel and PuzzMiX in Inti Creates Gold Archive Collection. A sequel, Mighty Gunvolt Burst, was released in June 2017.

== Gameplay ==
Mighty Gunvolt is an 8-bit style platform game in the style of Mega Man, in which players shoot their way through five main stages (as well as additional stages available as downloadable content). Players can play as one of three characters; Gunvolt from Azure Striker Gunvolt, Beck from Mighty No. 9, and Ekoro from Gal*Gun, each with their own unique abilities. Gunvolt can perform a double jump and use a chargeable lightning attack, Ekoro can float in mid-air and convert certain enemies to her side, and Beck can use slides and tackles to access certain areas and charge through opponents.

All stages end in a boss battle, many of which are the Sumeragi adepts of Azure Striker Gunvolt, but with some differences in their attacks or patterns. Additionally, one of the adepts, Zonda, actually steps in and fights the player character, in a reverse of their scene in Azure Striker Gunvolt, where Copen kills Zonda and fights instead. Zonda's boss battle was modified and adapted for Azure Striker Gunvolt 2.

== Development ==
Mighty Gunvolt was first released on the Nintendo eShop alongside Azure Striker Gunvolt as a free download for players who purchased the game, and was later released as a standalone title. A version update was released in November 2014, along with downloadable content containing four additional levels. A port for PlayStation 4 and PlayStation Vita, titled Gal Gunvolt, was released in August 2015, containing all downloadable stages.

== Sequel ==
A sequel to the game, titled Mighty Gunvolt Burst, was released for Nintendo Switch on June 15, 2017. Later releases on other platforms include a Nintendo 3DS release on June 28, 2017, followed by a PlayStation 4 release on March 15, 2018, renamed to Gal*Gunvolt Burst. The game also saw a PC release through Steam on July 31, 2019, once again called Mighty Gunvolt Burst.

=== Plot ===
Although a total of 9 characters are playable through downloadable content (Beck, Gunvolt, Ekoro, Call, Joule, Ray, Copen, Kurona, and Tenzou), Beck and Gunvolt's stories are the most fleshed out. Both of these routes feature the player character being sucked into a digital world resembling the one seen in Mighty No. 9, and after defeating the boss of the introductory stage, meeting what appears to be an evil version of the character that wasn't selected, who challenges them to defeat the 8 Mighty Numbers. From there, 8 stages become available, which can be played in any order. Each stage features a boss fight with one of the Mighty Numbers at the end. After defeating all eight, a cutscene plays where the playable character enters a crack in the simulation, leading in to the final four stages of the game. At the end of the first of these stages, the player fights the real version of the character they saw at the end of the intro stage. After winning the battle, the evil versions of Beck and Gunvolt both appear, as well as the game's true antagonist, Teseo, an adept originally from Azure Striker Gunvolt 2. The two heroes decide to work together, and simultaneously fire their weapons at Teseo during the final boss fight. However, after his defeat, Teseo resets the virtual world to its factory settings, which would doom the playable character to float in the void forever, if not for their sidekick coming in to save them in the minigame that plays during the credits. (Call saves Beck, Joule saves Gunvolt). In both endings, the sidekicks are teased to be joining the battle, building anticipation for their release as DLC characters.

=== Gameplay ===
The game features very similar retro run-and-gun 2D platforming to the first game, with a few differences besides level design. Differences that apply to all 9 playable characters include the game's titular "burst" system, which rewards the player with additional points for defeating enemies up-close as opposed to from a distance, as well as a new customization system. Players can discover upgrades hidden throughout the levels, then mix and match them to create up to 24 weapons on one save slot. However, most of these upgrades require "CP," a number which cannot be exceeded without the weapon becoming unusable. Much like the upgrades themselves, CP can be found hidden throughout the levels. Character-specific differences include the following:

- Beck: Capable of performing up to 3 air-dashes.
- Gunvolt: Capable of performing up to 3 mid-air jumps, as well as using special Septima abilities.
- Ekoro: Capable of hovering in the air, as well as using a technique called "Goddess's Blessing" to temporarily increase the damage of her bullets and make her invincible.
- Ray: Capable of using melee skills both grounded and airborne. However, Xel Decay means her health constantly depletes. She can regain health by defeating enemies.
- Copen: Capable of utilizing a wealth of "formations" with Lola as powerful EX weapons. He also has a more advanced air-dash than Beck.
- Kurona: Capable of hovering in mid-air, just like Ekoro. Her "Demonic Power" technique increases the power of her bullets, but instead of making her invincible, she gains the ability to pierce through enemy's shields. She can also use Spear Drop to attack enemies from above.
- Call: Capable of either hovering in the air or using a single air-dash. Uses a defensive barrier, and finds Patch Robots throughout the stage to help her destroy enemies.
- Joule: Capable of up to 3 jumps in mid-air, just like Gunvolt. She can use "Anthem" to negate CP limits temporarily.
- Tenzou: Capable of performing a slide, as well as temporarily activating "Doki Doki Mode" for an easier time destroying enemies.
