= Sayonara Umihara Kawase =

2013 video game

- Developer: Studio Saizensen
- Publishers: Agatsuma Entertainment (2013–2015); Degica (2016–present): NA: Natsume Inc.; (3DS version): EU: Agatsuma Entertainment; (3DS Version): EU: Strictly Limited Games; (PS Vita version)
- Director: Kiyoshi Sakai
- Producer: Yasuo Nakajima
- Designers: Kiyoshi Sakai; Kenshirō Fujii
- Programmer: Kiyoshi Sakai
- Artists: Toshinobu Kondo; Muneki Seki; Aya Sasaki; Hisanori Saito
- Composers: Atsuhiro Motoyama; Shinji Tachikawa
- Platforms: Nintendo 3DS, PlayStation Vita, Microsoft Windows
- Release: Nintendo 3DS: JP: June 20, 2013; NA: March 20, 2014; PAL: April 24, 2014; PlayStation Vita: JP: April 23, 2015; NA: April 21, 2015; EU: April 30, 2015; Microsoft Windows: WW: October 6, 2015
- Genre: Platformer
- Mode: Single-player

Sayonara Umihara Kawase (さよなら 海腹川背; "Farewell Umihara Kawase"), known in its initial Western release as Yumi's Odd Odyssey, is a puzzle-platformer video game. The third title in the Umihara Kawase series, it was the first to be released outside of Asia. It was released in Japan on June 20, 2013, for the Nintendo 3DS, and was published by Natsume Inc. in North America. Agatsuma Entertainment published the game for the European market under its original Japanese title. The game was eventually released in North America, Europe and Australia exclusively for Nintendo eShop in March and April 2014, respectively.

The 3DS version was eventually ported to the PlayStation Vita as Sayonara Umihara Kawase Chirari (さよなら 海腹川背 ちらり). This version also included the first game in the series. The port was published by Agatsuma in Japan in both physical and digital format, while American and European releases were digital only on PlayStation Network. Agatsuma also dropped the Yumi's Odd Odyssey name, calling it Sayonara Umihara Kawase + in western releases on its release in April 2015. A version for Microsoft Windows was released in October 2015, along with ports of the previous two series titles.

In November 2018, publisher Strictly Limited Games released Sayonara Umihara Kawase++ for the Vita. This version, denoted by the extra "+", features even more extra content in the form of artwork.

The game received mixed reviews from critics. While they praised the game's design, puzzles and surreal visual style, many felt that its difficulty was overly unforgiving, causing it to be a niche hardcore game rather than appealing to a wider audience.

== Gameplay ==
The game revolves around the main character using a fishing line to swing across obstacles and dodge enemies on her way to the exit of a level. The enemies consist of marine life, including bipedal fish creatures.

== Plot ==
The game includes a cast of playable characters including a younger Kawase, her classic self, her future descendant named Noko Yokoyama, and her childhood friend Emiko.

== Development ==
The game was first announced in March 2013. Half of the original staff were involved in its development.

== Reception ==
Reception

Review scores
Publication	Score
Destructoid	8/10
Famitsu	8/10, 9/10, 8/10, 8/10
Hardcore Gamer	3.5/5
Nintendo Life	9/10
Pocket Gamer	3.5/5
USgamer	4/5

Morgan Sleeper of Nintendo Life praised the game, describing its gameplay as "superb" and "skill-based", and its style as "delightfully bizarre". Calling it an "absolute joy", he compared it to other platformers like Mischief Makers, Klonoa, and Kirby: Canvas Curse as a unique spin on the genre. Matthew Diener of Pocket Gamer gave the game a more mixed review, saying that while it was "disarmingly cute", the "steep difficulty" made it not for him. Calling its challenges "tough but fair", he criticized the need to restart a level each time the player died. He described it as a "hard sell" at its typical retail price. Neal Ronaghan of Nintendo World Report was somewhat negative about the game, saying he was frustrated with the game's difficulty and retry system.
