= Code of Princess =

2012 video game

- North American Nintendo 3DS cover art
- Developer: Studio Saizensen
- Publishers: JP/PAL: Agatsuma Entertainment (3DS); NA: Atlus USA (3DS); WW: Degica (PC); WW: Nicalis (NS)
- Designer: Masaki Ukyo
- Artist: Tetsuhiko Kikuchi
- Platforms: Nintendo 3DS, Windows, Nintendo Switch
- Release: Nintendo 3DS: JP: April 19, 2012; NA: October 9, 2012; PAL: March 28, 2013; Windows: WW: April 14, 2016; Code of Princess EX; Nintendo Switch: WW: July 31, 2018; JP: August 2, 2018; Windows: WW: October 2, 2020
- Genres: Action role-playing, hack and slash
- Modes: Single-player, multiplayer

Code of Princess (Note: Japanese: コード・オブ・プリンセス, Hepburn: Kōdo obu Purinsesu) is an action role-playing video game developed by Studio Saizensen and originally published by Agatsuma Entertainment for Nintendo 3DS. It was released in Japan in April 2012 by Agatsuma Entertainment, and in North America by Atlus USA in October 2012, Agatsuma Entertainment also published the game in Europe and Australia in March 2013, exclusively as an eShop title. A version for Windows was released in April 2016.

An enhanced port entitled Code of Princess EX launched for the Nintendo Switch between July and August 2018, courtesy of Nicalis worldwide, and Pikii in Japan.

== Gameplay ==
Code of Princess is a hack and slash video game that features several game modes and over 50 playable characters. In single-player mode there is a story-driven campaign mode with several scenarios where only 4 characters (Solange, Ali, Zozo and Allegro) are playable, a "free play" mode that allows playing any campaign scenario with any available character, and a "Bonus Quests" mode where additional scenarios are unlocked and must be beaten with specific requirements. The game also has RPG elements, at the completion of a scenario, the player receives experience points, money, and sometimes equipment to use on the playable characters. When a character levels up the player can allocate status points freely. There is also a multiplayer mode that supports local and network play where players can play several scenarios cooperatively, or they can fight each other in a Versus Mode, up to four combatants in a fight.

== Plot ==
In a world populated by humans and monsters, Princess Solange Blanchefleur de Lux is exiled from her home Kingdom of DeLuxia after it is attacked by monsters, and the royal family is blamed for the attack by the Distron army. Armed with the Sacred Blade DeLuxcalibur, Princess Solange sets out to find the cause of the monsters' violent behavior while also avoiding the Distron Army, who are looking for the DeLuxcalibur. On her journey Solange meets several people, including female thief Ali Baba, zombie-like Necromancer Lady Zozo, bard/sage Allegro, martial artist Master T Drakkhen, blind samurai "Shooting Star" Tsukikage, business-driven cat Marco Neko, and warrior/nun Sister Helga "Hel" Wilhelmina. Zozo, Tsukikage and Master T join Solange because they feel "drawn" to the DeLuxcalibur. Zozo also explains that she isn't currently in her real body, but rather created a body for herself because her real body was stolen. Solange and her team eventually learn that Distron's leader Queen Distiny is behind the monster attacks, and then fight the generals of Distron, which include ninja Baku Juppongi, a former acquaintance of Ali; sorcerer Alchemia, and General Liongate, who actually is Solange's brainwashed brother Schwartz.

Solange's team eventually discovers that Queen Distiny is actually a cover identity for fallen angel Dios Diablos Distille, who in the past tried to destroy the world but was defeated, and now was trying to recover her strength to try again to destroy the world. Zozo reveals that her real name is Milk Macchiato and that her body was stolen by Alchemia, who in reality is her sister Cocoa, who had her own body stolen as well, by Queen Distiny. They also learn that Distille's power source is her "Code" and the Empyrean Stone, and learn that the gods created the stone and the monsters as means to keep the human population in check, because in the past human civilization grew unchecked and nearly destroyed themselves. Schwartz explains that Solange also has a "Code" of her own, the titular Code of Princess, capable of countering Distille's Code.

The team briefly considers destroying the Empyrean Stone but don't do so as it is also the source of the world's magic and the monsters. Solange's team then proceed to confront Distille who reveals that she sealed her "Code" in a group of humans (Zozo, Master T and Tsukikage) and lured them to come to her, and that she also needed the DeLuxcalibur to put her Code back together and fully revive. Distille's plan failed, however, because Zozo wasn't in her true body but rather in a corpse constructed from "spare parts" animated by magic, and thus she didn't have the full portion of Distille's code sealed into her. A weakened Distille is forced to flee to the Tower of Wrenne, location of the Empyrean Stone, seals herself inside it, and taunts Solange, telling her that she won't dare to destroy the stone as she fully knows the consequences of doing so, and then threatens that she will return in a thousand years at full strength. Whether Solange destroys the stone or not triggers one of the two endings:

- Destroy the stone: Solange destroys the stone using the DeLuxcalibur and Distille is defeated; this brings the side effect of magic and monsters disappearing. As Zozo's corpse is animated by magic she begins to die; however Alchemia/Cocoa takes her body back from Distiny and also returns Zozo's body; thus Zozo is finally able to return to her real body.
- Don't destroy the stone: Things are left as they are, and Solange is confident that everyone's descendants will be able to fight Distille in the future. The team then continues their journey, to return Zozo to her true body.

== Development ==
The game plays very similar to the Sega Saturn title Guardian Heroes. Guardian Heroes' director and character designer Tetsuhiko Kikuchi and lead programmer Masaki Ukyo worked on Code of Princess. Both of them served as contractors for the title.

Atlus USA provided a full localization for the North American release on the Nintendo 3DS, including English voice acting. Agatsuma Entertainment adopted this localization for the PAL region release. Albeit the PC version of the game was released worldwide, the game's new publisher Degica did not retain the English voice-acting, keeping only the translated text from the original 3DS version.

== Reception ==
Reception

Aggregate score
Aggregator	Score		
Aggregator	3DS	NS	PC
Metacritic	67/100	66/100	53/100

Review scores
Publication	Score		
Publication	3DS	NS	PC
Destructoid	9/10	8.5/10	N/A
Eurogamer	6/10	N/A	N/A
Game Informer	7.5/10	N/A	N/A
GameSpot	7.0/10	N/A	N/A
GamesRadar+	3.5/5	N/A	N/A
Hardcore Gamer	N/A	3.5/5	3.5/5
IGN	6.9/10	N/A	N/A
Joystiq	3/5	N/A	N/A
Nintendo Life	9/10	7/10	N/A
Nintendo World Report	8/10	8.5/10	N/A
Pocket Gamer	3/5	N/A	N/A
RPGamer	3.5/5	N/A	N/A

Code of Princess and its enhanced port, Code of Princess EX, garnered "mixed or average" reviews according to review aggregator site Metacritic.

== Legacy ==
In 2013, the team behind the first game has expressed interest in developing a sequel to the game for PlayStation 4 and Xbox One.

Solange, Ali, Liongate and Master T all appear as playable characters in the 2018 crossover fighting game Blade Strangers. Solange also appears as a playable character in the 2019 puzzle game Crystal Crisis.
