= Digital Game Xpo =

The Digital Game Xpo (DGXPO) was the Southeast U.S.'s largest game industry conference. The event was organized and hosted by Wake Technical Community College in Raleigh, North Carolina. The first event was held in 2005 and it was held annually until 2009. The event comprised an expo, career fair, student showcase, and a variety of tutorials, lectures, and roundtables by industry professionals. The expo also held a number of tournaments for popular games of the time like Guitar Hero, Super Smash Bros., and Halo 3.

DGXPO has evolved into the East Coast Game Conference.

== History ==
The first DGXPO was held in 2005 at Wake Technical Community College. The event was organized by Walter Rotenberry and has been facilitated by him ever since. The event featured an expo with exhibitors including Gamefrog, Virtual Heroes, Inc., and Red Storm Entertainment. The event also had a number of lectures on topics like in-game cinematics, the Unreal Engine, and DarkBASIC. 2005's expo featured two notable keynote speakers: Tim Sweeney (game developer) from Epic Games, and Bill Stealey from Interactive Magic.

After the success of the first event, DGXPO was set as an annual event. The 2006 DGXPO featured keynotes from Jerry Heneghan of Virtual Heroes, Inc., and Jason Della Rocca of the IGDA. The keynote speakers in 2007 were Damon Conn previously of Westwood Studios, EA, and currently with 7 Studios, Rett Crocker of Republic of Fun (formerly of 3DSolve) and Ryan Stradling of EA.

The 2008 expo was drastically overhauled and a number of new activities have been added including numerous tournaments, LEGO displays, costume contests, an expanded expo room, and a student showcase for game design students in the RDU area. The two keynote speakers for 2008 were Steve Reid from Red Storm Entertainment, and Brenda Brathwaite from the Savannah College of Art and Design.

In 2009, the expo dropped game tournaments and focused solely on the game industry adopting a new name, the Triangle Game Conference. For its 2011 iteration, the Triangle Game Conference became the East Coast Game Conference.
