= Umihara Kawase Shun =

1997 video game

- PlayStation cover art
- Developers: Jackpot; Rocket Studios (PSP); Suzak; Studio Saizensen (DS)
- Publishers: XING; Marvelous Entertainment (PSP); Genterprise (DS)
- Director: Kiyoshi Sakai
- Designer: Kiyoshi Sakai
- Programmer: Kiyoshi Sakai
- Artists: Toshinobu Kondo; Hideyuki Yamashita; Junko Kawahara
- Composers: Atsuhiro Motoyama; Shinji Tachikawa
- Platforms: PlayStation, PlayStation Portable, Nintendo DS, Microsoft Windows
- Release: JP: February 28, 1997; JP: January 20, 2000 (second edition); PlayStation Portable: JP: March 27, 2008; Nintendo DS: JP: October 29, 2009; Microsoft Windows: WW: November 24, 2015
- Genre: Platformer
- Mode: Single-player

Umihara Kawase Shun (海腹川背・旬; "Umihara Kawase In Season") is a puzzle-platformer video game and the second in the Umihara Kawase series. It was first released on February 28, 1997, for the PlayStation in Japan. A second edition, Umihara Kawase Shun ~second edition~ Maruan Series 1 (Japanese: 海腹川背・旬 〜セカンドエディション〜 マル安シリーズ（1）), was released almost three years at a lower price as part of the Maruan series, while a PlayStation Portable version, Umihara Kawase Portable (Japanese: 海腹川背 Portable), was released on March 27, 2008. A Nintendo DS compilation, Umihara Kawase Shun ~second edition~ Kanzenban (Japanese: 海腹川背・旬 セカンドエディション完全版), was released on October 29, 2009, featuring the first two games in the series, along with some extra levels, and wireless exchange of data is also supported. The game received a Steam release on November 24, 2015. This Windows version, also the first time it was released worldwide, added leaderboards, achievements, and Steam Trading Cards, among other features.

Umihara Kawase Portable disappointed critics on release, due to a bug-ridden physics engine, which differed in crucial aspects to its predecessors. Further criticism was leveled at the new visual perspective, which sometimes interfered with play. The DS port has been far better received by fans of the series than the PSP port, as it is a much more faithful conversion.

== Gameplay ==
The move to a 3D side on game world opened up the fields to more complex layouts using a great deal of angled and jutting blocks. Slightly adjusted line physics (the rope is shorter, but more elastic and springy), along with no presence of slowdown, are the other main notable changes from its predecessor.

== Development ==
The original game was developed by the same team as the original.

The Second Edition adds three new levels, fixes glitches, and removes the game's voice acting, replacing the in-game product placement with static artwork. It includes unlockable artwork for completing certain paths and levels. The defunct Japanese magazine TECH PlayStation Extra contained three new fields in each of its June, July and August 1997 issues' demo discs, along with guides to complete them.

The development of the Nintendo DS port was overseen by original designer/programmer Kiyoshi Sakai, with additional artwork from Toshinobu Kondo.

Umihara Kawase Portable was originally scheduled to be localized in the West under the title Yumi's Odd Odyssey, but instead, the game's sequel was released under the same name.

== Reception ==
Reception

Review score
Publication	Score
Dengeki PlayStation	80/100, 80/100

Kurt Kalata of Hardcore Gaming 101 called the game's PlayStation version much more polished, comparing the graphics to being hand-painted. While praising the sprites, he described the graphics as "repetitive", saying there was not much enemy variety. He also called the game's "blatant product placement" "jarring to say the least", criticizing the inclusion of commercials within the game by Umihara's voice actress as immersion-breaking and unwelcome. Nevertheless, he called the game's boss fights more interesting, and praised the inclusion of "Practice Mode", which allows the player to replay levels.

While characterizing the game's Second Edition as an improvement, especially due to the removal of advertising, Kalata called the PlayStation Portable version "frankly, terrible", saying that it was "so full of bugs that it's nearly unplayable" and that the physics engine had been changed. Saying that it got a bad reputation almost immediately due to gameplay videos of the different physics, he noted it as a commercial flop. He stated that the DS version was an improvement, and the "ultimate Umihara Kawase package".

Siliconera said that Umihara Kawase Portable "looks innocent enough", but in reality was "nightmarish", calling the fishing line Umihara's "only weapon, tool and friend". Daniel Feit of Wired, reviewing the Nintendo DS version, compared the game to Bionic Commando. Despite its lack of localization, he recommended the game to Western gamers due to the Nintendo DS being a region free platform, and the game being "relatively straightforward" to play.
