= Azure Striker Gunvolt 2 =

2016 video game

- Developer: Inti Creates
- Publisher: Inti Creates (Note: Retail versions published by Yacht Club Games for Nintendo 3DS in North America, and by Nighthawk Interactive for Nintendo Switch in North America and Europe)
- Director: Yoshihisa Tsuda
- Producer: Takuya Aizu
- Programmer: Hironori Ikeda
- Artists: Yoshitaka Hatakeyama; Munehiro Araki
- Writers: Toshiaki Tai; Sakiko Nakada
- Composers: Ippo Yamada; Ryo Kawakami; Aoi Takeda; Mina Hatazoe; Kotaro Yamada
- Platforms: Nintendo 3DS; Nintendo Switch; PlayStation 4; Windows; Xbox One; Xbox Series X/S
- Release: Nintendo 3DS: JP: August 25, 2016; WW: September 29, 2016; Nintendo Switch: WW: August 31, 2017; PlayStation 4: WW: April 23, 2020; Windows: WW: June 22, 2020; Xbox One, Series X/S: JP: July 13, 2022; WW: July 14, 2022
- Genres: Action, platform
- Mode: Single-player

Azure Striker Gunvolt 2, known as Armed Blue: Gunvolt Sou (蒼き雷霆(アームドブルー)ガンヴォルト爪) in Japan, is a 2D side-scrolling action-platform video game developed and published by Inti Creates for the Nintendo 3DS. The sequel to Azure Striker Gunvolt, it was released in Japan on August 25, 2016 and worldwide on September 29, 2016. A compilation containing the game and its predecessor, titled Azure Striker Gunvolt: Striker Pack, was also available at retail in Japan and North America. Striker Pack was later released for Nintendo Switch on August 31, 2017 and PlayStation 4 on April 23, 2020. The standalone game was ported to Windows on June 22, 2020 and was released for Xbox One and Xbox Series X/S on July 14, 2022. A sequel, Azure Striker Gunvolt 3 was released in 2022 for Nintendo Switch, Xbox One, Xbox Series X/S, PlayStation 4, PlayStation 5, and Windows.

== Gameplay ==
The gameplay builds from that of the original game. The main character, Gunvolt, controls nearly identically to the previous game, using a gun to lock onto enemies and then using his electric field in order to attack them. Players can also control Copen, a character that played a major role in the previous game. He has a different control scheme to Gunvolt that focuses on his dash attack. Copen can dash into an enemy and slam into it, which locks onto the enemy and allows Copen to shoot it with targeted attacks. He can also use powers from defeated bosses, similar to the Mega Man franchise.

== Plot ==
Sometime after the ambitions of Sumeragi Group controlling the whole population of adepts with the failed "Project Muse" project and the death of their leader, Nova, the Sumeragi Group is in a massive power vacuum. As the story begins, three executives are aboard the Sumeragi airship, Seraph, arguing about the future of Sumeragi, when an alarm breaks out: an intruder has been cornered. The intruder is none other than Gunvolt, who has long left QUILL behind and works as a solo agent. He is accompanied by his girlfriend, Joule, who only exists in the form of Lumen, her own septimal projection known as "The Muse", as she was physically killed in events prior and bonded herself to Gunvolt's septima. The duo make short work of the guards on the Seraph, until they are made aware by Xiao, a young adept whom Gunvolt befriended and acts as his handler on missions, that the Seraph is on a crash course with a skyscraper in the middle of the city. Gunvolt races to stop the Seraph from crashing, forced to use his septimal powers as a magnetic cushion to pull the Seraph away from the building, with Joule amplifying her abilities to their limits.

Meanwhile, Copen, a human scientist and warrior who harbors a massive hatred of adepts, arrives on the scene to investigate the events, as well as to search for his younger sister, Mytyl, who is hospitalized in the very building the Seraph was about to crash into. Gunvolt arrives with Mytyl, having rescued her from a mechanical guard, and delivers her to Copen, but Copen's attitude towards Gunvolt is still sour after their prior encounter. The two are suddenly ambushed, however, by Zonda, an adept Copen thought he had killed months before, who reveals to them a new group of adepts called the Seven, members of a cult called Eden, all led by Zonda. Zonda has stolen Sumeragi technology with aims to create much more powerful versions of the Glaives, and reveals what they call their true form: a young, pink-haired girl. In this form, Zonda uses her septima to capture Joule in a mirror and shatter her to pieces, taking the shards to amplify the powers of the Seven's septimal forms, now housed in new containers known as Grimoires. Copen manages to snatch a shard from Zonda and gives chase, and Gunvolt finds one last piece of Joule has remained with him, albeit reverted to a much younger, childlike form and severely weakened in power. Gunvolt and Copen later meet with their operators and allies: Gunvolt returns to his new apartment to meet with Xiao and Quinn, a human girl who harbors strong feelings for Gunvolt, much to Joule's dismay; Copen returns to his lab to visit Mytyl and his lab assistant and maid, Nori, to discuss their plans to eradicate the Seven. The two follow slightly differing but parallel paths.

=== Gunvolt's Path ===
Gunvolt is given a new outfit by Quinn and Xiao, and the trio outline four members of the Seven to investigate and take out. The first, Gibril, is a young punk girl whose septima, "Metallon", allows her to create bladed weapons through metal, especially via hemoglobin in blood. The second, Milas, is an environmentalist who uses his "Ichor" septima to control and freely move through water to deliver deadly attacks. The third, Teseo, is an internet troll and black hat hacker who constantly harasses Gunvolt and Joule, and can use his "Hack the Planet" septima to digitize and destroy reality. The fourth, Tenjian, uses his "Permafrost" septima to attack with deadly ice blades and sub-zero temperatures. En route to Tenjian, Gunvolt runs into Copen and is forced into battle with him, but Copen breaks and retreats.

After killing the first four members of the Seven, Gunvolt is sent to a highway in the city by Xiao, where he runs into Copen again, as well as a fifth member of the Seven: Ghauri, a street dancer and slam poet who uses his "Prism Cataclysm" septima to create deadly crystallized weaponry. Copen retreats again, leaving Gunvolt to deal with Ghauri. Gunvolt makes short work of Ghauri and returns to his apartment, where Xiao reveals that he's located Eden's fortress, the Garden, in a remote nation called Tashkent. The two head off to take out Eden once and for all, while Quinn stays to watch over the base. In the fortress, Gunvolt finds and eliminates the remaining Seven members. Deep within the fortress, he encounters Zonda, who battles him in her illusory forms, but when Zonda shatters, Gunvolt deduces he was fighting an illusion. Continuing on, he finds Zonda in her young girl form, who has Mytyl captive and unconscious. Zonda explains that Joule and Mytyl are two halves of a whole; Joule was the adept part of Mytyl removed in an operation that left her mute and sickly, and cloned into her own body by Sumeragi. Using Mytyl as a proxy, Zonda rips Joule completely from Gunvolt's septima and uses her to power their own septima to unspeakable levels and transform into a deadly demonic form. Undeterred, Gunvolt manages to fight and kill Zonda for good, but at a cost: Mytyl has died thanks to Zonda, and Gunvolt curses himself for allowing an innocent girl to die. Copen arrives on the scene, and seeing Mytyl dead, swears to Gunvolt that he will kill every adept on the planet, starting with him. The two face each other in a Mexican standoff.

=== Copen's Path ===
Checking in with Mytyl, Copen's robotic partner, a sentient weapon pod he named Lola, suddenly projects a humanoid female form, much to Copen and Mytyl's shock. Copen deduces that the shards he was collecting from adepts is the cause, but is puzzled by its occurrence only around Mytyl.

Copen and Nori outline four members of the Seven to investigate and take out. The first, Desna, is an amateur astrologer who attacks with living hair brought about by her "Splitting Ends" septima. The second, Asroc, is a former pastry chef who can control machinery with his "Puppetmaster" septima. The third, Ghauri, is a street dancer and slam poet who uses his "Prism Cataclysm" septima to create deadly crystallized weaponry. The fourth, Tenjian, uses his "Permafrost" septima to attack with deadly ice blades and sub-zero temperatures. En route to Tenjian, Copen runs into Gunvolt and goads him into battle, but Gunvolt retreats.

After killing the four members of the Seven, Mytyl is kidnapped by Eden. Copen is forced to chase down two of the members, Gibril and Teseo. He corners both of them in the sewers, where Teseo tells Copen that Mytyl was sent to their fortress, the Garden. Gibril sends Teseo off and confronts Copen, but Copen manages to kill her. He returns to base to determine the location of the Garden with Nori, and locates it in the remote nation of Tashkent. Traveling to the Garden, Copen destroys the remaining members of the Seven, and encounters Zonda once again in their bigender form; however, when Zonda shatters after battle, Copen realizes he was fighting an illusion. Continuing deeper into the fortress, Copen encounters Zonda once more in their little girl form, who has Mytyl captive and unconscious. Zonda explains that Mytyl is an adept, and that her adept half was removed and cloned as Joule; the trauma of the operation left Mytyl mute and sickly. Copen is shaken beyond belief at the notion that his sister is an adept, and Zonda uses Mytyl as a proxy to rip the power of the Muse away from Lola, transforming into a horrible demonic form. Copen manages to kill Zonda after a ferocious battle, but at a cost: Mytyl dies from the severe strain. Copen has a breakdown and swears vengeance against all adepts, innocent or not. Gunvolt arrives on the scene, and the two are locked in a Mexican standoff.

=== Finale ===
When both paths are completed, the final act of the game sees Gunvolt and Copen locked in a standoff as before, but Copen instigates that every adept must die, no matter what. Gunvolt tries to sway him out of killing adepts, and the two engage in combat with one another until one of them is killed. At that moment, Mytyl revives, demanding that the two stay away from one another, and surrounded by the power of Lola and Lumen, she revives the fallen warrior, whose power is amplified to its utmost limits, and the two battle each other to absolute exhaustion. However, they decide not to kill one another, thanks to the words of a revived Mytyl, now reunited with the essence of Joule and having regained her voice once again, but losing her memories of the two.

In Gunvolt's ending, he and Quinn are out together, when he has a chance encounter with Mytyl, who stops, puzzled, and asks him if he's an angel, echoing Joule's first words to him. Gunvolt kindly tells her he's not, deciding it's for the best that she never remembers him again.

In Copen's ending, Copen decides that he can no longer be around his sister again, and asks Nori to tell his sister that he died in combat. Nori asks him what he will do, and Copen tells her that he needs to search for answers, but he cannot face his sister, now knowing that she's an adept.

In a post-credits scene, Mytyl is shown to be happy at last, although she occasionally has dreams about Gunvolt, revealing that Joule's memories still live on in her. She hopes to thank Gunvolt personally one day for everything he's done for her.

If the 80% of the challenges are complete with both characters, a secret ending is shown where Xiao and Nori were working together for sealing the Muse inside Mytyl. When asked of his motives, Xiao says that he doesn't plan something bad.

== Development ==
The game was teased in February 2015, when Inti Creates posted a tweet with the logo for the game. No further info was revealed until over a year later, when a Nintendo Direct on March 3, 2016, showed footage for the game. An official trailer was published the same day, revealing a vague release date of "Summer 2016".

When Azure Striker Gunvolt Striker Pack was announced, the Japanese release date for both versions was set as August 25. Later, when it was announced that Inti Creates have partnered with Yacht Club Games in order to bring the physical release to North America, which will release on October 4. In an official Twitch stream by Inti Creates on August 20, it was also revealed that Europe would be getting the digital version on September 30 as well, but the release date for the physical version remains unknown. As a result of the collaboration with Yacht Club Games, players can unlock a special boss battle against the titular protagonist of Shovel Knight through use of the Shovel Knight amiibo. In December 2016, Japan released a DLC pack that contains score attacks, a song track and a speed run mode.

== Reception ==
Reception

Aggregate score
Aggregator	Score
Metacritic	3DS: 76/100

Review scores
Publication	Score
Destructoid	8.5/10
GameSpot	8/10
Nintendo Life	7/10

The game received positive reviews. Inti Creates announced that global eShop sales of Azure Striker Gunvolt 2 have reached 38,000 downloads as of May 1, 2017.

== See also ==
- Mighty Gunvolt
