= Agatsuma Entertainment =

Japanese video game publishing company

- Industry: Video games
- Founded: 1997; 29 years ago
- Defunct: December 11, 2015; 10 years ago
- Headquarters: Asakusabashi, Taito, Japan
- Products: Games for video game consoles
- Website: http://agatsuma-games.jp/

Agatsuma Entertainment (Note: Japanese: アガツマ・エンタテインメント) was a Japanese video game publishing company established in 1997. It mainly published titles for the Nintendo DS, Wii, and Nintendo 3DS platforms. They also had an agency business, coordinating deals between developers and publishers worldwide. The company dissolved on December 11, 2015 and fully liquidated on March 31, 2016.

== Works published ==
Title	Date	Developer	Platform(s)
Pocket Dogs	JP: December 9, 2004	Agatsuma Entertainment	Game Boy Advance
Soreike! Anpanman: Baikinman no Daisakusen	JP: December 1, 2005	Agatsuma Entertainment	Nintendo DS
Anpanman to Asobo: Aiueo Kyoushitsu	JP: December 7, 2006	Agatsuma Entertainment	Nintendo DS
Hana Deka Club: Animal Paradise	JP: April 26, 2007	Agatsuma Entertainment	Nintendo DS
Let's Draw!	JP: April 3, 2008	Agatsuma Entertainment	Nintendo DS
Anpanman to Asobo: ABC Kyoushitsu	JP: May 1, 2008	Agatsuma Entertainment	Nintendo DS
Drawn to Life: God's Marionette	JP: December 4, 2008	5th Cell	Nintendo DS
Anpanman to Asobo: Aiueo Kyoushitsu DX	JP: December 17, 2009	Agatsuma Entertainment	Nintendo DS
Learning With the PooYoos: Episode 1	JP: May 11, 2010	Lexis Numerique	Wii, WiiWare
NyxQuest: Kindred Spirits	JP: May 11, 2010	Over the Top Games	Wii, WiiWare
Anpanman Niko Niko Party	JP: November 25, 2010	Agatsuma Entertainment	Wii
Code of Princess	JP: April 19, 2012	Studio Saizensen	Nintendo 3DS, Nintendo eShop, Microsoft Windows
Sayonara UmiharaKawase	JP: June 20, 2013	Studio Saizensen	Nintendo 3DS, Nintendo eShop, PlayStation Vita, Microsoft Windows
Anpanman to Asobo: New Aiueo Kyoushitsu	JP: March 6, 2014	Agatsuma Entertainment	Nintendo 3DS
IronFall: Invasion	JP: October 28, 2015	VD-Dev	Nintendo 3DS, Nintendo eShop
