= Umihara Kawase =

Japanese video game series

- Genre: Platform
- Developers: TNN/NHK SC; Jackpot; Genterprise; Studio Saizensen
- Publishers: TNN; XING; Marvelous Entertainment; Natsume Inc. Genterprise; Agatsuma Entertainment; Degica; Success; Nicalis
- Platforms: Super Famicom, PlayStation, PlayStation Portable, Nintendo DS, Nintendo 3DS, Nintendo Switch, PlayStation Vita, Microsoft Windows
- First release: Umihara Kawase; 1994
- Latest release: Umihara Kawase Bazooka! 2020

Umihara Kawase (Japanese: 海腹川背) (Note: The name is written as four kanji characters: umi, hara, kawa, se meaning sea-belly-river-back. This is an extraction from a Japanese kitchen idiom "Sea fish are fat in the belly; river fish are fat in the back".) is a series of platform games starring the sushi chef Kawase Umihara, (Note: The character's given name is Kawase; her surname Umihara comes first in the game's title because of the conventions of Japanese name order.) who has become lost in a world of surreal salt-water and fresh-water creatures. The series began with Umihara Kawase for the Super Famicom in 1994, which was followed by Umihara Kawase Shun in 1997, Sayonara Umihara Kawase in 2013, Umihara Kawase Fresh! in 2019, and Umihara Kawase Bazooka! in 2020.

== Development ==
The game was an independent collaboration between developer Kiyoshi Sakai, illustrator Toshinobu Kondo, and several others. It was published by TNN, "Think about Needs of Notice for human being".

== Gameplay ==
The game world of Umihara Kawase is constructed from a set of interconnected levels known as fields. Each field connects to one or more fields deeper within the game via doors.

Fields are enclosed areas containing a number of static and moving platforms, ladders, spikes, enemy sea-life and one or more exit doors. The doors are often positioned in hard to reach places and it is the player's goal to plan a safe route to one. Each exit door in a field takes the player to a different field, and the goal is to find a safe route through the fields and arrive at a final exit door (at which point the credits scroll and the game is over). Each of the Umihara Kawase games contains multiple routes through the fields and multiple final exits. Using shortcuts and optimised door routes can allow the game to be completed within minutes in the hands of a skilled player. Enjoyment of the game typically lies not in merely making it to the first or easiest final exit door, but in exploring the game's many routes and mastering the challenging rope physics.

The Umihara Kawase games have simple controls. The eponymous player character is able to run, jump, climb onto ledges, climb ladders and, crucially, throw her fishing line. When thrown, the fishing line will hook onto nearly all surfaces within the games. When the line is firmly hooked onto a surface or an enemy fish the line is able to take her weight. From here Kawase is able to swing between platforms, lower herself down to other ledges and swing herself up to higher ledges. Due to the flexible nature of her line she can also catapult herself great distances by stretching the line to breaking point. The line can also be used to stun fish and reel them in, and once reeled in Kawase will store them in her rucksack and score points in doing so.

While the controls are simple and responsive, an uncompromising physics model means that graceful control of the game's swinging techniques will not come immediately. Out of this, though, comes great scope for advanced techniques through full utilization of the physics. Perfect execution of techniques such as the one- and two-step rocket jump are required both in later fields and for those who intend to improve their field completion times.

The games contain 1ups in the shape of Kawase's pink rucksack but no other collectibles are present.

== Games ==
- Umihara Kawase is the first game in the series released in 1994 for the Super Famicom. It was originally in development for the X68000. Umihara Kawase contains a total of 49 fields of which four are exit fields and six are boss fields. The game makes good use of the SFC's colour palette for digitized photographic backgrounds. The rope physics sometimes strain the Super Famicom's CPU, leading to slowdown, but this is rare. The game permits saving speedruns, establishing such play as a principal feature of the series. The game, along with Shun, was ported for PC in 2015. The slowdown from the Super Famicom version is no longer present though the game remains largely the same with the addition of a practice mode.
- Umihara Kawase Shun is the second game in the series. It was released in 1997 for the PlayStation and developed by the same team as the original. The move to a 3D side-on game world with the PlayStation launch of Shun opened up the fields to more complex layouts using a great deal of angled and jutting blocks. The move to a 3D game world was not universally welcomed, however, as it decreases the ease with which the player can identify the exact point in space where platforms begin and end. Slightly adjusted line physics (the rope is shorter, but more elastic and springy), along with no presence of slowdown, are the other main notable changes from its predecessor. The game received several re-releases and ports: Umihara Kawase Shun ~second edition~ Maruan Series 1, a version without in-game advertising, Umihara Kawase Portable for PlayStation Portable, and Umihara Kawase Shun ~second edition~ Kanzenban for Nintendo DS. It got a worldwide release for Microsoft Windows in 2015.
- Sayonara Umihara Kawase is the third game in the series, initially localized as Yumi's Odd Odyssey, was released in Japan in June 2013 for the Nintendo 3DS. Half of the original staff were involved in its development. The gameplay is similar to past games. The game includes a cast of playable characters including a younger Kawase, her classic self, her future descendant named Noko Yokoyama, and her childhood friend Emiko. The game was also the first in the series released outside of Asia, with Natsume Inc. publishing it in North America. Agatsuma Entertainment published the game for the European market under its original Japanese title, unlike the North American release. The game was released in North America, Europe and Australia exclusively for Nintendo eShop in March and April 2014, respectively.
- Umihara Kawase Fresh! (Japanese: 海腹川背 Fresh!), was released on Nintendo Switch in Japan in April 2019, and later in Europe and North America in July from Nicalis. The game was later released for PlayStation 4 in 2020 in Japan on April 23, May 15 in Europe, and October 30 in North America. A Microsoft Windows port of the game was released worldwide in May 2020.

== Other media ==
- Umihara Kawase Hyper Technique guidebook (ISBN 4-7962-0273-0. Publication: 29 March 1995).
- Stray Sheep Volume 5 - Happy Angel (Toshinobu Kondo Personal Works). This edition of the Japanese illustration magazine contains works by Toshinobu Kondo, many of which are of Umihara Kawase (cover included).
- Umihara Kawase Shun Capture Guidebook (ISBN 4-900700-37-1. Publisher: T2 Publishing Co. Ltd. Publication: March 31, 1997). Full colour guide book includes gameplay basics, enemies, field maps with routes and "Toshinobu Kondo presents" artwork section.
- Umihara Kawase Shun Perfect Guide Book (ISBN 4-88199-337-2. Publisher: Shinseisha. Publication: March 1997). Full colour three part techniques section, monochrome field maps and guide.
- TECH PlayStation Extra CD-ROM magazine. The June, July and August 1997 issues (SLPM-80100, SLPM-80108, and SLPM-80117) of this Japanese publication contain 3 new fields each along with information on techniques required to complete them.
- Kawase, Noko and Emiko appear as playable characters in the crossover fighting game Blade Strangers. A second version of Kawase, "Summer Kawase", became playable in a later game update.
- Kawase appears as a playable character in the crossover puzzle game Crystal Crisis.
