= Azure Striker Gunvolt =

2014 video game

- Developer: Inti Creates
- Publisher: Inti Creates (Note: Retail versions published by Yacht Club Games for Nintendo 3DS in North America, and by Nighthawk Interactive for Nintendo Switch in North America and Europe)
- Director: Yoshihisa Tsuda
- Producers: Keiji Inafune; Takuya Aizu
- Designers: Hiroki Miyazawa; Toshiaki Tai
- Programmer: Naoya Murakami
- Artists: Yoshitaka Hatakeyama; Munehiro Araki; Ken Fujii; Tetsuya Enda
- Writer: Toshiaki Tai
- Composers: Ippo Yamada; Ryo Kawakami; Katsunori Yoshino; Mina Hatazoe
- Platforms: Nintendo 3DS; Windows; Nintendo Switch; Nintendo Switch 2; PlayStation 4; Xbox One; Xbox Series X/S
- Release: Nintendo 3DS: JP: August 20, 2014; NA: August 29, 2014; PAL: April 2, 2015; Windows: WW: August 28, 2015; Nintendo Switch: WW: August 31, 2017; PlayStation 4: WW: April 23, 2020; Xbox One, Series X/S: WW: June 29, 2022; Nintendo Switch 2: WW: October 22, 2026
- Genres: Action, platform
- Mode: Single-player

Azure Striker Gunvolt, known as Armed Blue: Gunvolt (Note: Japanese: 蒼き雷霆(アームドブルー)ガンヴォルト, Hepburn: Amudo Burū Ganvoruto) in Japan, is a 2D side-scrolling action-platform game developed and published by Inti Creates. It was first released for Nintendo 3DS via eShop in August 2014. Ports of the game were released for Windows in 2015, for Nintendo Switch in 2017, for PlayStation 4 in 2020, for Xbox One and Xbox Series X/S in 2022, and for Nintendo Switch 2 in 2026. In addition to utilizing gameplay similar to Mega Man Zero, Azure Striker Gunvolt also introduced new gameplay elements such as Gunvolt's ability to "tag" enemies and target many at once, adding an additional layer of complexity to the genre.

Set in a futuristic world in which beings known as “Adepts” coexist with humanity, the game follows a powerful adept named Gunvolt, who upon following a botched assassin attempt, leaves the organization that he works for to become a freelance agent. Across the game, Gunvolt attempts to use his adept powers to dismantle the Sumeragi Group, who, under their guise as peace keeping corporation, seeks to destroy the adept race.

Mighty Gunvolt, a crossover with Mighty No. 9 and Gal Gun, was released on the same day as Azure Striker Gunvolt. It was followed by a sequel, Mighty Gunvolt Burst, in 2017. A direct sequel, Azure Striker Gunvolt 2, was released in 2016. A spin-off centered on character Copen, Gunvolt Chronicles: Luminous Avenger iX, was released in 2019 and received its own sequel, Gunvolt Chronicles: Luminous Avenger iX 2, in 2022. The latest installment, Azure Striker Gunvolt 3, was released for Nintendo Switch, Xbox One, Xbox Series X/S, PlayStation 4, PlayStation 5 and PC in 2022.

== Gameplay ==
Like the Mega Man series, namely the original series, Mega Man X, Mega Man Zero and Mega Man ZX, Azure Striker Gunvolt is a side-scrolling action platform game. The player controls the eponymous Gunvolt, who is able to jump, dash, and utilize a gun with special bullets that "tag" their targets, which grants a homing effect to Gunvolt's electric fields. Hitting an enemy with multiple tags will guide more of Gunvolt's electricity towards that enemy, increasing damage. The player's actions are limited by an energy bar, which depletes when using the electrical field, using additional movement abilities such as double-jumping or air dashing, or being hit by enemies. Whenever the energy bar is depleted, Gunvolt will enter an "Overheat" state and will be unable to use his septimal powers or defend himself until it refills.

Gameplay focuses heavily on the player's technique and skill in moving through stages. While finishing a stage is relatively easy, the game provides a ranking system as well as several optional challenges. The game introduces a "chain" system in which the player's score is constantly increased so long as the player avoids being hit by enemies, with special actions such as defeating an enemy in the air or defeating multiple enemies at one time providing an additional bonus. The game uses an item-forging and equipping system, the former of which is instrumental in achieving the game's true ending.

Additionally, Gunvolt has access to several super move-like skills called Offensive Skills, which allow him to perform powerful attacks or heal himself. Each of the game's bosses also have their own Offensive Skills, which are triggered when their health bar drops below a certain level, or in the case of Elise, one of the bosses, when one of her halves is killed before the other. Speaking to Joule in Gunvolt's apartment in between stages also increases the chance of being brought back to life by Lumen when he dies in a stage, which gives Gunvolt unlimited Septimal energy, but at the cost of a higher stage ranking. Gunvolt can also level-up when he gains a certain amount of experience from defeating certain enemies.

== Plot ==
Azure Striker Gunvolt is set during an unspecified date in the near future, in which several people called "adepts" have developed "septimal powers". These powers enable superhuman feats including flight, the use of powerful energy weapons, and manipulation of the elements like fire, water, and electricity. The world is at peace thanks to the efforts of a world-spanning corporation known as the Sumeragi Group. However, the Sumeragi Group is, in reality, controlling and experimenting on adepts. Gunvolt, one of the most powerful adepts, has the ability to create electrical fields and works for an organization known as QUILL, which is seeking to reveal and put a stop to Sumeragi's ulterior motives.

The game opens with Gunvolt assigned on a mission to assassinate an adept named Lumen. He is told that Lumen has the ability to resonate with and control any adepts through her singing, and is considered dangerous. However, Gunvolt discovers that Lumen is the septimal projection of a young girl named Joule, who is a captive of Sumeragi's scientists, and can't bring himself to kill her. He instead rescues her, leading him to amicably defect from QUILL and set out on his own to protect her. He becomes a freelance agent, but still works jobs for QUILL from time to time.

Six months after defecting from QUILL, Gunvolt is offered a freelance assignment by Moniqa, his handler from QUILL, to investigate and take out several agents of the Sumeragi Group. The Sumeragi agents are all adepts as well, but powered by strange Glaives, which house their septimal essences, and are representative of each of the Seven Deadly Sins. The first agent, Merak, is a lazy, unenthusiastic adept with the power to bend space for use in his attacks. The second, Jota, is a prideful agent with the power to manipulate light. The third, Viper, is loud, brash, and violent, has control over fire, and harbors a jealous rage against Gunvolt for Joule. The fourth, Carerra, uses magnetic fists and waves to draw his enemies close before destroying them with a powerful pulsewave. The fifth, Elise, is a split personality adept: her meek, timid side and her brash, assertive side are at constant odds, but her ability to raise the dead allows for even adepts to come back from defeat. The sixth, Stratos, is a drug-addicted adept with an insatiable hunger for the very drug that keeps what little of his sanity remains in check, and has control over swarms of insects. The seventh, the carnal Zonda, attacks and wounds Zeno, one of Gunvolt's friends from QUILL, but is seemingly killed by a human warrior named Copen, who harbors a major hatred for adepts and carries a gun capable of firing bullets that can suppress their powers. Copen warns Gunvolt that they are not on the same side, and after a brief skirmish, retreats.

After defeating the Sumeragi agents, Gunvolt's apartment is invaded, and Joule is kidnapped by a resurrected Merak. Gunvolt gives chase, destroying Merak for good, and rides a space elevator to a Sumeragi orbiting platform. Along the way, he encounters the resurrected Stratos, Jota, and Viper and fights them all to the death, before finding that Elise herself had a hidden feral and wild third personality; responsible for the resurrection of the agents. This third personality is killed by Copen, and Gunvolt is forced to fight and subdue him. Gunvolt finally encounters the leadership of Sumeragi, a young psychic adept named Nova. He uses Lumen in combat against Gunvolt, before summoning Joule and three Glaives into himself to transform into a monstrous beast. Gunvolt manages to kill Nova and escape with Joule. In the initial ending, Gunvolt runs into Asimov, his father figure and the leader of QUILL, who offers Gunvolt and Joule new places in QUILL, and reveals an ulterior motive: with Sumeragi in shambles, Asimov wishes to use Lumen, along with the Sumeragi satellite, to wipe out the human race as payback for suppression of adepts. Gunvolt refuses his offer, telling Asimov that he is no better than Sumeragi was, and Asimov responds by shooting him through the heart using Copen's gun (implying that he defeated Copen to steal it from him), before turning the gun on Joule and shooting her as well, leaving them both for dead.

However, if Gunvolt is wearing a special pendant Joule made for him, which is made of collectable jewels that are hidden within each stage, this ending will be revealed as a dream and the true ending will occur instead. The true ending sees Gunvolt on the verge of death as in the initial ending, but he is then rescued by Lumen at the last minute. He awakens to find Joule's body, deathly cold and still. Heartbroken, Gunvolt screams in sadness until he hears Lumen's voice, and ultimately realizes that, in an act of love in order to save his life and be with him wherever he goes, Joule forsook her physical form by fusing her mind and personality with Lumen before further fusing herself into Gunvolt's septimal energy, which amplifies Gunvolt's power to its utmost limits. After this revelation, Gunvolt chases down Asimov, running into Carrera along the way. Carrera demands vengeance for his prior defeat, but is killed once and for all by Gunvolt. Continuing onward to the elevator, Gunvolt confronts Asimov, who reveals himself to have the same electrical septimal powers as Gunvolt. With no other choice, Gunvolt fights him to the death. Following this final battle, Asimov warns Gunvolt that he will never be truly free of conflicts in his life, and dies from his wounds. Zeno and Moniqa meet the space elevator as it arrives, only to find Asimov dead and a heartbroken, wounded Gunvolt, who offers no explanation as to what happened before he simply wanders away into the morning light to be alone with Joule.

== Development ==
Azure Striker Gunvolt was developed by Inti Creates, the Japanese video game development company that also created the Mega Man Zero series, Mega Man ZX, and both Mega Man 9 and Mega Man 10. Players who purchased the game upon release received a free download for the spin-off game, Mighty Gunvolt.

Inti Creates later released an update for the game on March 5, 2015 on the Nintendo eShop. The update fixes typos in the game's dialogue, fixes various glitches, adds the ability to transfer save data from the demo version to the purchased version, adds new features exclusive to the New Nintendo 3DS, and more new/updated content.

A version for Windows was released in August 2015. A physical release, titled Azure Striker Gunvolt: Striker Pack, consisting of both Azure Striker Gunvolt and its sequel, Azure Striker Gunvolt 2, was released on September 30, 2016 in Japan. Yacht Club Games released it in North America on October 4, 2016. Azure Striker Gunvolt: Striker Pack was released for Nintendo Switch in August 2017, and PlayStation 4 on April 23, 2020. An update for the eShop release of the first game added in the voiceovers from the Striker Pack and used the newer translation from the Steam release. However, neither of these have made it anywhere else in the world, and Inti Creates has yet to comment on this issue. A standalone port for Xbox One and Xbox Series X/S was announced and released on June 29, 2022.

== Reception ==
Reception

Aggregate scores
Aggregator	Score
GameRankings	81%
Metacritic	77/100

Review scores
Publication	Score
Destructoid	8/10
Game Informer	8/10
GameSpot	8/10
IGN	7.8/10
Nintendo Life	9/10

Azure Striker Gunvolt received "generally favorable" reviews and sold over 90,000 units six months after its release, being praised for its art and gameplay, although it has experienced some criticism of its similarities in plot to the Mega Man series. Inti Creates later announced that Azure Striker Gunvolt had sold 100,000 units by March 2015. In March 2016, Inti Creates announced that Azure Striker Gunvolt had sold over 150,000 units worldwide and aired a presentation regarding its sequel on April 26, 2016. In May 2016, Inti Creates announced that it had sold 160,000 units worldwide. Inti Creates announced that sales of Azure Striker Gunvolt have exceeded 180,000 downloads as of May 1, 2017. On September 7, 2017, Inti Creates announced that sales of Azure Striker Gunvolt on 3DS have cleared 250,000 downloads.

== Legacy ==
On February 27, 2015, Inti Creates announced that a sequel was already in development. Azure Striker Gunvolt 2 was released digitally for Nintendo eShop in August 2016 in Japan, and September 2016 in North America. It was later ported to multiple platforms. The third main title, Azure Striker Gunvolt 3, was announced in 2020, and was released for Nintendo Switch on July 28, 2022, for Xbox One and Xbox Series X/S on August 2, 2022, for Windows on October 13, 2022, for PlayStation 4 and PlayStation 5 on December 15, 2022, and for Nintendo Switch 2 on October 22, 2026. A spin-off title focusing on the character Copen, Gunvolt Chronicles: Luminous Avenger iX, was released for Nintendo Switch, PlayStation 4 and Windows on September 26, 2019, but was delayed for Xbox One until December 19, 2019. Gunvolt Chronicles: Luminous Avenger iX 2 was released for the Nintendo Switch, PlayStation 4, PlayStation 5, Xbox One, Xbox Series X/S and Windows on January 27, 2022. Copen also appeared as a playable DLC character in the game COGEN: Sword of Rewind by developer Gemdrops, which released on the same date as Luminous Avenger iX 2.

Mighty Gunvolt, a retro-style shooter featuring characters from Gunvolt and Mighty No. 9, was released in 2014, followed by a sequel, Mighty Gunvolt Burst, in 2017. Gunvolt also appears as a playable guest character in several titles, including Runbow, Blaster Master Zero, Indie Pogo, and Blade Strangers.
