= 1001 Spikes =

2014 platform video game

- Developers: 8bits Fanatics; Nicalis
- Publisher: Nicalis
- Producer: Tyrone Rodriguez
- Designers: Samu Wosada; Tyrone Rodriguez
- Programmer: Jeremy Stevens
- Writers: Samu Wosada; Tyrone Rodriguez
- Composers: Tadd Nuznov; Misoka Panipum
- Platforms: Linux, Windows, Nintendo 3DS, OS X, PlayStation 4, PlayStation Vita, Wii U, Xbox One
- Release: June 3, 2014: NA: June 3, 2014; EU: October 1, 2015 (3DS, Wii U); PAL: October 7, 2015 (PS4, Vita) Xbox One June 10, 2014
- Genre: Platform
- Modes: Single-player, multiplayer

1001 Spikes is a platform game developed by 8bits Fanatics and Nicalis, and published by Nicalis. Originally named Aban Hawkins & the 1000 Spikes, the game's objective is to escape a vast terrain and struggle to reach victory without being impaled by spikes and many other disasters. Throughout the multiple travels, the game gets increasingly challenging, especially having to dodge falling stones and much more.

== Plot ==
Jim Hawkins, a world-renowned archaeologist, has been lost within the frozen tundra of Antarctica. Before his disappearance, his daughter Tina is left with a map to the forgotten ruins of South America. Together with her estranged brother Aban, they explore the temple and try to retrieve their father's legacy.

== Reception ==
Reception

Aggregate score
Aggregator	Score
Metacritic	(Wii U) 83/100 (Vita) 81/100 (PC) 80/100 (PS4) 78/100 (3DS) 73/100 (XOne) 70/100

Review scores
Publication	Score
Destructoid	(Wii U) 9.5/10
Famitsu	32/40
GameSpot	(PS4) 8/10
Hardcore Gamer	(PS4) 3.5/5
IGN	8/10
Nintendo Life	8/10
Nintendo World Report	(Wii U) 8/10
Official Nintendo Magazine	(3DS) 75%
Official Xbox Magazine (UK)	(XOne) 7/10
Pocket Gamer	(Vita) 4/5
Polygon	(Vita) 8/10
Push Square	(PS4) 8/10
Shacknews	(PS4) 8/10
USgamer	(3DS) 4.5/5

The Wii U, PlayStation Vita, PC, and PlayStation 4 versions received "generally favorable reviews", while the 3DS and Xbox One versions received "mixed or average reviews", according to the review aggregation website Metacritic. In Japan, where the 3DS and Wii U versions were ported and published by Pikii on November 25, 2015, followed by the PS4 and Vita versions on November 27, Famitsu gave them each a score of two eights, one nine, and one seven for a total of 32 out of 40.

IGN favored the PC and PS4 versions' abundance of content and exhilarating disasters, while showing disappointment of the increasing repetition of the game as the levels advance. GameZone gave the game 8.5 out of 10. They praised the game for a large amount of levels, a bunch of unlockable characters, and a few multiplayer modes to play, but noted "tough" yet "immensely satisfying" gameplay. Edge gave the 3DS version a score of six out of ten, saying that the craftsmanship is easy to control, but noted that the game can be difficult in several occasions.
