= Mobile phone games of the Breath of Fire series =

The Breath of Fire mobile phone game series is a group of mobile phone video games developed and distributed by Capcom based on their Breath of Fire role-playing franchise. Each game was created by the company's mobile game division for use on NTT DoCoMo, SoftBank, and au brand phone devices compatible with EZWEB, BREW, and i-mode services, and are distributed using paid downloads. Capcom released the first title, Breath of Daifugō, in August 2003, which was followed by additional games from a variety of genres up through November 2008. No entry in the Breath of Fire mobile games series has been released outside Japan.

== Games ==
=== Breath of Daifugō ===
Breath of Daifugō (Japanese: ブレス オブ 大富豪) is the first mobile phone game based on the Breath of Fire series, and is a simulated version of the Japanese card game daifugō featuring characters from Breath of Fire IV. The game includes a normal version of the game which can be played against a computer-controlled opponent, as well as an "Endless" mode that continuously gives the player cards even after their deck has been extinguished. A Tournament Mode is also included, which allows multiple players with their own copies of the game to compete against one another. The game was released in Japan in August 2003 alongside another Capcom mobile card game, Solitaire Fighter, exclusively for NTT DoCoMo brand devices.

=== Breath of Fire: Ryū no Tsurishi ===
Breath of Fire: Ryū no Tsurishi (ブレス オブ ファイア 竜の釣り師, lit. Breath of Fire: Dragon Fisherman) is a fishing game based on the minigame from Breath of Fire IV. Players control the character Ryu through a closed environment containing a lake, which they can fish in using 20 different kinds of lures and 6 separate rods. As the player approaches an area of water they can cast from, an indicator appears alerting them that they may fish from that spot. The game contains 34 different species of fish for the player to catch, each with their own weight which can be recorded as a high score, as well as the fish merchant Manillo, who can provide the player with new equipment by trading in fish from their stock. Like the previous game, Ryū no Tsurushi was released exclusively for DoCoMo brand phones, and was made available in October 2005 alongside the mobile version of Mega Man 2.

=== Breath of Fire IV: Honō no Ken to Kaze no Mahō ===
Screen shot from Breath of Fire IV: Honō no Ken to Kaze no Mahō

Breath of Fire IV: Honō no Ken to Kaze no Mahō (ブレスオブファイアIV 炎の剣と風の魔法, lit. Breath of Fire IV: The Sword of Fire and the Magic of Wind) is an action role-playing spin-off of Breath of Fire IV. Taking place sometime during the events of the game, the player controls Ryu and Nina as they try to escape soldiers of the Empire by venturing into five separate dungeons filled with monsters and traps. Unlike Breath of Fire IV, where combat took place in a turn-based fashion, battles in Honō no Ken to Kaze no Mahō happen in real-time, with enemies roaming each area along with the player. Ryu may attack enemy creatures using sword techniques as well as his dragon transformation skill, while Nina utilizes magic spells to damage opponents from afar, with both characters able to be switched at will. By defeating enemies, characters gain experience points that allow them to gain levels, making them stronger and giving them access to new skills. In addition to battling, players must dodge traps and solve puzzles laden throughout each dungeon in order to advance, all while avoiding members of the pursuing Empire. The game was initially released in November 2007 for DoCoMo devices, and was later made available for au and SoftBank brand phones in 2008.

=== Breath of Fire IV: Yōsei-tachi to Hikari no Kagi ===
Like the previous mobile title, Breath of Fire IV: Yōsei-tachi to Hikari no Kagi (ブレスオブファイアIV 妖精たちと光のカギ, lit. Breath of Fire IV: The Faeries and the Key of Light) is an action role-playing spin-off of Breath of Fire IV. The game revolves around a group of Faeries who live in their own dimension known as Dream World, and have lost their town treasure, the Key of Light. As Ryu and Nina, the player must travel through dungeons filled with enemies in order to find the 10 missing pieces of the key while battling enemies and avoiding traps. Like the previous game, battles take place in real time, with enemies appearing on the field screen along with the player, and may be defeated using either Ryu's sword techniques or Nina's magic. In addition to finding the missing parts of the key, players must also help upkeep the Faerie Village a similar manner to Breath of Fire IV by assigning faeries to do specific tasks such as finding food, clearing land, or defending the town. The town-building scenario is expanded from the original game by allowing the player greater control over the growth of the village, such as the placement of houses, along with an on-screen indicator of all remaining villagers. The game was released for DoCoMo brand phones in November 2008, and later became available for au devices in 2009.
