= Breath of Fire 6 =

2016 video game

- Developer: Capcom
- Publisher: Capcom
- Producer: Kazunori Sugiura
- Composer: Tamiya Terashima
- Series: Breath of Fire
- Platforms: Windows, Android, iOS
- Release: Windows, Android: JP: February 24, 2016; iOS: JP: July 12, 2016
- Genre: Role-playing
- Modes: Single-player, multiplayer

Breath of Fire 6: Hakuryū no Shugosha-tachi was a free-to-play online multiplayer role-playing video game by Capcom as the sixth main installment of its Breath of Fire series. The game was released in Japan on February 24, 2016, for Windows and Android, with an iOS release following on July 12, 2016. Online operations for the title officially ceased on September 27, 2017.

== Gameplay ==
Breath of Fire 6 was an online action-based roleplaying game where players created a hero character whom they could customize in appearance, gender, and skills. Both characters and environments were presented using two-dimensional graphics, with the player traveling across several environments battling enemies and taking part in the story. They were accompanied by AI-controlled partners called "Fellows" who make up their party to help complete missions, while multiplayer missions allowed up to four players to team up together. The hero's class could be customized depending on their weapon specialization, which could branch into other, more specialized classes with more powerful abilities as they progressed.

Both the player's hero and their Fellows could utilize rechargeable skills and spells which enabled the player to create timed combo chains, such as combining two spells into a larger one. Eventually players could unlock the ability to build up a meter that allows the hero to temporarily transform into a dragon form called "D-Trance Mode" and cause bigger damage to enemies. Players could connect to a hub village that allowed them to shop for items and equipment, chat and team up to accomplish co-operative missions. Like previous entries in the series, players could customize their own village as the game progresses.

== Plot ==
=== Characters ===
Players assumed the role of a male or female hero who is the sibling of Ryu (voiced by Kappei Yamaguchi), the young mayor of the town of Dragnier who goes missing following an attack by the villainous Insidia Empire. The player was assisted by a number of support characters including Nina (voiced by Kyōko Hikami), a descendant of a race of humans who could once transform into giant birds and who was searching the world for her lost sister. Other denizens of Dragnier and its surroundings included Gilliam (voiced by Hiroki Yasumoto), a blue-furred, wolf-like Wolba beastman who was striven to protect his forest home; Amelia (voiced by Mai Nakahara), an aloof but intelligent magic-user of the Algar sheep-horned tribe; Jubei (voiced by Hiroshi Naka), an older, weasel-like Kamaitachi beastman archer who acted as a distributor of advice; Masamune (voiced by Takehito Koyasu), a Kamaitachi swordsman and old friend of Jubei; and Peridot (voiced by Haruka Tomatsu), a traveling female musician who lacked emotion but was otherwise kind.

The central antagonists were members of the Insidia Empire, led by Emperor Steinberg, which intended to use the powers of the Dark Dragons to take over the world and create lasting peace through oppression. Their chief knight was Klaus (voiced by Toshiyuki Morikawa), the strongest swordsman in the Empire, who was joined by Elise (voiced by Hitomi Nabatame), a woman who wielded a similar dark power, and Elena (voiced by Chiaki Takahashi), a mysterious woman with vast knowledge of the dragon clans.

=== Story ===
The game takes place 1,000 years after an apocalyptic battle between the Light and Dark Dragon clans, humans with the ability to transform into powerful dragons with immense destructive power, that ended thanks to the actions of a mysterious young man. The resulting fallout caused planet-wide gradual desertification, and over the years the people of the world have created new communities, paving the way for a peaceful new era. However, behind the scenes, the powerful Insidia Empire covertly disrupted that peace, overtaking the world slowly and dominating smaller countries, one by one.

One of the lands that fell under the Empire's strength was the town of Dragnier, home to the hero and their brother, Ryu, which was razed by the Empire who destroyed all in their path. Peridot, a traveling bard who just happened to come by the ruins, found the hero in trouble and saves them. Together with the surviving citizens of their hometown, the hero and his companions needed to rebuild their lost land and strike back at the Empire while discovering the secrets of the dragon clans.

== Development ==
Breath of Fire 6 was first announced in August 2013 during Capcom's Network Game Conference in Japan, where it was given a tentative release date in the region for the following year. It is the first main installment in the series not to debut on a home console, and was created specifically for touch-based PCs, smart phones and tablets. Capcom designed the game as an "easy touch type online RPG" with simple controls and "exhilarating combat", and it was the first main series title released since Breath of Fire: Dragon Quarter in 2002. The title supported online play as well as a cross-platform save feature that allowed players to resume their progress on separate devices. Speaking with website Eurogamer, a representative of Capcom remarked on the uncertainty of the title appearing outside Japan, stating "As with all of Capcom's games we need to consider both their suitability for release in local markets and the resources are available to ensure we deliver a high quality gameplay experience in each territory." On March 31, 2016 a statement was issued by the Breath of Fire 6 development team announcing the delay of the iOS version of the game to Summer 2016.

The game's official theme song was "In Our Hands" by Haruka Tomatsu, which was released in Japan as the B-side to her single "Fantastic Soda!!" on July 30, 2014. A soundtrack album for the game was released in two volumes: the first, the Breath of Fire 6 Original Soundtrack -Myakudou-, was made available on February 24, 2016; and the second, Breath of Fire 6 Original Soundtrack -Ryuushou- followed on July 27, 2016.

== Reception ==
Breath of Fire 6 received mostly negative reviews among players, earning a 1.5 out of 5 average on the Japanese Google Play store at the time of its closure in 2017. Timothy Donohoo of CBR remarked on the game's "horrible" reception and short life of only a year and a half before its servers were shut down, declaring it "a half-hearted effort at reviving the franchise." Ben Morgan of Kotaku called it "the worst version of what you’d expect, microtransactions and all, when an established series goes free-to-play." The title's graphics were often deemed a "rip-off" of Wizet's 2003 MMORPG MapleStory rather than using the art style established in previous games in the series.

== Service closure ==
On July 27, 2017, Capcom announced that Breath of Fire 6 would be ending service in two months "due to changes in external environment." The game's servers were shut down on September 27, 2017, with all players being refunded for any unused Dragon Crystal in-game currency.
