= Kappei Yamaguchi =

Japanese actor and rakugoka (born 1965)

- 山口 勝平
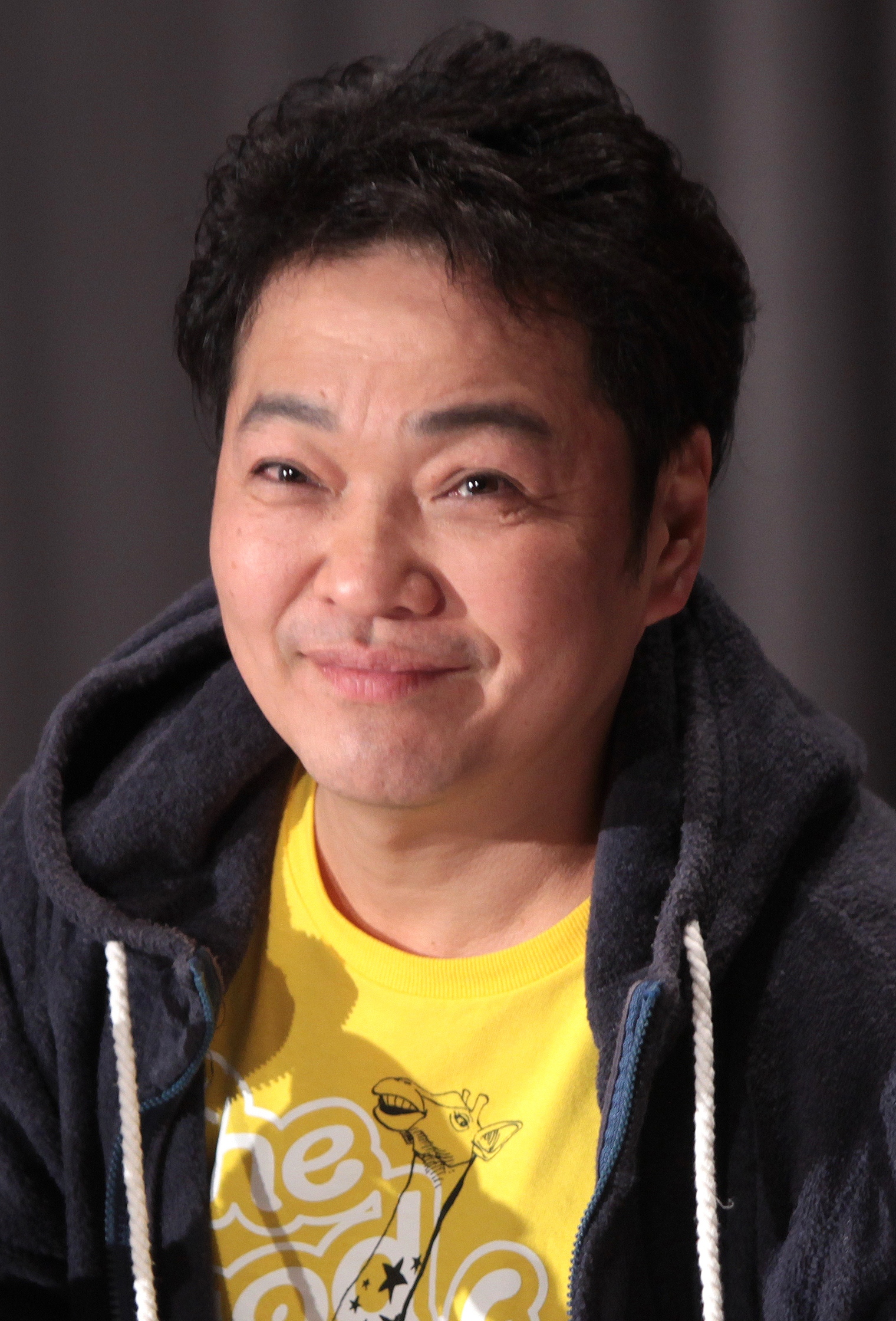
- Yamaguchi in 2016
- Born: Mitsuo Yamaguchi (山口 光雄); May 23, 1965 (age 61); Fukuoka, Japan
- Other names: Kyōya Ushihisa (牛久 京也); Nonoya Pepepee (のゝ乃家ぺぺぺぇ)
- Occupations: Actor; voice actor; rakugoka
- Years active: 1985–present
- Notable work: Death Note as L; Detective Conan as Shinichi Kudo and Kaito Kuroba; Hunter x Hunter as Feitan Portor; Inuyasha as Inuyasha; One Piece as Usopp; Ranma ½ as Ranma Saotome (male); Persona 4 The Animation as Kuma
- Spouse: 1
- Children: Ryūnosuke Yamaguchi (山口 竜之介) (son, born 1992); Akane Yamaguchi (山口 茜) (daughter, born 1996)

Mitsuo Yamaguchi (山口 光雄, Yamaguchi Mitsuo; born May 23, 1965), known professionally as Kappei Yamaguchi (山口 勝平, Yamaguchi Kappei), is a Japanese actor, voice actor, and rakugoka currently affiliated with Gokū and formerly with 21st Century Fox. After making his voice acting debut in 1989 as the male version of the titular character Ranma Saotome in the Ranma ½ television anime, he went on to perform other notable roles such as the titular character in Inuyasha and in its sequel Yashahime, and L in Death Note. He currently voices Shinichi Kudo and Kaito Kid in Great Detective Conan, Usopp in One Piece and Teddie in Persona 4. He is married and has a son named Ryūnosuke and a daughter named Akane. Ryūnosuke and Akane are also voice actors, while the latter is also a rakugoka.

== Biography ==
=== Early life and education ===
Yamaguchi was born in Fukuoka. He graduated from Fukuoka's prefectural Chikuzen High School. In 1984, Yamaguchi moved to Tokyo and entered the Tokyo Announce University College, a vocational school training various performers from voice actors to singers to announcers or even reporters and dancers.

=== Background ===
Yamaguchi is the son of a carpenter father. He had been into anime as a child, but his interest lapsed in high school after joining a band.

He attended acting classes taught by Kaneta Kimotsuki, and soon joined his 21st Century Fox theater company. About a year after joining, he took the stage for the first time in a supporting role, and played the lead role of the boy detective in So Kitamura's "Odoriko ~THE DANCER MURDER CASE~".

Yamaguchi began made his lead anime voice role debut as the titular character Ranma Saotome in the Ranma ½ television anime.

=== Activities as a voice actor ===
He has appeared in numerous works in the fields of live-action dramas, animation, games, and foreign film dubbing. In anime, he specializes in playing lively children and young people. In the early 1990s, he also played low-key roles such as Eto in Record of Lodoss War and Gokujurota in Gale! Iron League.

In Great Detective Conan, he plays Shinichi Kudo and Kaito Kid. His favorite "Conan" episode is "Flying Locked Room Shinichi Kudo's First Incident".

In One Piece, he originally wanted to voice the main character Monkey D. Luffy and went to audition for the role, but was unsuccessful. He decided to voice Usopp after receiving an offer. Yamaguchi has been reading the original manga since the beginning of the serialization, and couldn't imagine what kind of voice the character would have prior to getting the role.

=== Other ventures ===
In the Japanese dubbed versions of international works, Yamaguchi is the voice of Kyle Broflovski in South Park, Bugs Bunny in Looney Tunes, and Crash Bandicoot in the video game series of the same name. He appeared in hentai and eroge as Kyōya Ushihisa (牛久 京也, Ushihisa Kyōya). After performing rakugo at an event in 2017, Yamaguchi started studying under Shirano Tatekawa. He uses the name のゝ乃家ぺぺぺぇ as a rakugoka.

Yamaguchi made his first public appearance in North America at Otakon 2008 and in Sakura-Con 2009. His made third and fourth appearances at Animazement in 2010 and Kawaii Kon in 2011.

Yamaguchi won the Individual Seiyu Award at the 2003 Tokyo International Anime Fair.

He established his own entertainment production company known as Gokū Co. Ltd., which he is the president of.

In 2019, Yamaguchi won the Kei Tomiyama Award at the 13th Seiyu Awards.

== Filmography ==
=== Anime series ===
Year	Title	Role	Note	Ref
1989-92	Ranma ½	Ranma Saotome	Debut	
1990	Kyatto Ninden Teyandee	Yattaro		
1992	Super Zugan	Hideyuki Toyotomi		
1993	YuYu Hakusho	Jin		
1993	Miracle Girls	Yūda Noda		
1993	Jungle King Tar-chan	Etekichi		
1993	Nintama Rantarō	Hanabusa Makinosuke		
1993	Shippū! Iron Leaguer	Jūrōta Kiwami		
1994	Mobile Fighter G Gundam	Sai Saici		
1994	Red Baron	Ken Kurenai		
1994	Ginga Sengoku Gun'yuuden Rai	Tasuke		
1994	Captain Tsubasa J	Adult Ryo Ishizaki		
1995	Wedding Peach	Takurou Amano		
1995	Demon Child Zenki	Zenki (little)		
1995	Imagination Science World Gulliver Boy	Gulliver Toscanni		
1995-96	Gokinjo Monogatari	Tsutomu Yamaguchi		
1996	Baby and Me	Takuya Enoki		
1996	Brave Command Dagwon	Rai Utsumi		
1996	Case Closed	Shinichi Kudo		
1996	GeGeGe no Kitarō	Noppera-bō		
1996	The Vision of Escaflowne	Shesta		
1997	Pokémon	Tōru		
1997	Revolutionary Girl Utena	Shiori's ex-boyfriend		
1998	Fancy Lala	Tarō Yoshida		
1998	Cowboy Bebop	Rhint	Episode 10	
1998	Cyber Team in Akihabara	The White Prince (Crane Bahnsteik)		
1998	Takoyaki Mantoman	Blue		
1999	Betterman	Keita Aono		
1999	Eden's Bowy	Yorn		
1999	Digimon Adventure	Chuumon		
1999	One Piece	Usopp		
1999-00	Kamikaze Kaitō Jeanne	Noin Claude		
2000-04; 2009-10	Inuyasha	Inuyasha		
2000-01	Baby Felix	Poindexter		
2000-01	Gravitation	Sakuma Ryūichi		
2001	Angelic Layer: Mobile Angel	Ryo Misaki		
2001	Beyblade	Michael Parker		
2001	Sister Princess	Taro Yamada	Episode 1	
2001-02	Pecola	Bashatt		
2002	Asobot Military History Goku	Gokū		
2002	Atashin'chi	Fujino		
2002	Rizelmine	Tomonori Iwaki		
2002	Gun Frontier	Tochiro Oyama		
2002	The Twelve Kingdoms	Enki		
2002	Weiß Kreuz Glühen	Sena Izumi		
2003	Mouse	Sorata Muon/Mouse		
2003	Di Gi Charat Nyo!	Blue Ranger		
2003	Zatch Bell!	Danny		
2003	Papuwa	Chappy		
2003	Rumiko Takahashi Anthology	Intendant		
2003-04	Peacemaker Kurogane	Shinpachi Nagakura		
2004	Yu-Gi-Oh! GX	Daitokuji/Amnael		
2004	Sgt. Frog	Recruit Tororo		
2004	Doki Doki School Hours	Kenta Suetake		
2004	DearS	Oikawa Hikorō		
2005	Doraemon	Warusa	Episode 228	
2005	The Law of Ueki	Sōya Hideyoshi		
2005	Fushigiboshi no Futagohime	Ghost	Episode 21	
2005	Paradise Kiss	Yamaguchi Tsutomu		
2005-08	Eyeshield 21	Raimon "Monta" Tarō		
2006	Futari wa Pretty Cure Splash Star	Flappy		
2006	Kiba	Hugh		
2006-07	Death Note	L		
2007	Baccano!	Tick Jefferson		
2007	Da Capo II	Wataru Itabashi		
2008	Neo Angelique ~Abyss~	Rene		
2008	One Outs	Satoshi Ideguchi		
2008	To Love-Ru	Lacospo		
2009	Pandora Hearts	Cheshire Cat		
2010	Magic Kaito	Kaito Kuroba/Kaitō Kid	Television special	
2011	Dororon Enma-kun Meeramera	Enma-kun		
2011-12	Persona 4: The Animation	Kuma (Teddie)		
2012	Hunter × Hunter	Feitan		
2013	Danganronpa: The Animation	Hifumi Yamada		
2014	Chō-Bakuretsu I-Jigen Menko Battle Gigant Shooter Tsukasa	Mendō Tsukasa		
2014	Persona 4: The Golden Animation	Kuma (Teddie)		
2014	Magica Wars	Esora		
2014	Magic Kaito 1412	Kaitō Kid/Kaito Kuroba		
2014	JoJo's Bizarre Adventure: Stardust Crusaders	Forever		
2015	Rampo Kitan: Game of Laplace	Corpsey		
2015	Rin-ne	Sabato Rokudō		
2016	Shōwa Genroku Rakugo Shinjū	Amaken		
2016	JoJo's Bizarre Adventure: Diamond Is Unbreakable	Shigekiyo Yangu		
2016	Nobunaga no Shinobi	Hideyoshi		
2016-17	Kamiwaza Wanda	Wanda		
2017	The Ancient Magus' Bride	Oberon		
2018	Radiant	Master Lord Majesty		
2019	Vinland Saga	Jabbathe		
2019	Zoids Wild	ムシ仙人	Ep 21	
2020	Bofuri	Shin		
2020	The Gymnastics Samurai	Bigbird Aragaki		
2020-22	Yashahime	Inuyasha		
2021	Jujutsu Kaisen	Kechizu		
2021	Odd Taxi	Kakihana		
2022	JoJo's Bizarre Adventure: Stone Ocean	Yo-Yo Ma		
2022	Boruto	Ōga		
2024	Bucchigiri?!	Komao		
2024	Mechanical Arms	Yakumo		
2024	Ranma ½	Ranma Saotome		
2025	Ishura Season 2	Krafnir the Hatch of Truth		
2025	Mechanical Marie	Old Man Carl		
2026	Daemons of the Shadow Realm	Hikaru "Hagure" Kagemori		
2027	Inherit the Winds	Momoyama Kyūsai		

=== Original video animation ===
Year	Title	Role	Note	Ref
1988	Legend of the Galactic Heroes	Heinrich Lambertz		
1990	1+2=Paradise series	Yuusuke Yamamoto		
1990	Devil Hunter Yohko	Wakabayashi Osamu		
1990	Ryokunohara Labyrinth: Sparkling Phantom	Kanata Tokino		
1990-91	Record of Lodoss War	Etoh		
1990-91	Urotsukidoji II: Legend of the Demon Womb	Young Munchausen II		
1991	Mōryō Senki MADARA	Madara		
1991	Slow Step	Shū Akiba		
1991	RG Veda	Ryū-ō		
1991-93	Sōryūden	Amaru Ryudo		
1991-95	The Heroic Legend of Arslan series	Arslan		
1992-93	K.O. Century Beast Warriors	Wan Dabadatta		
1992-94	Tokyo Babylon	Subaru Sumeragi		
1992-98	Giant Robo: The Day the Earth Stood Still	Daisaku Kusama		
1992-02	La Blue Girl	Nin-Nin		
1993-96	Ranma ½ series	Ranma Saotome		
1993	The Cockpit	Soldier Utsunomiya		
1994	Fish in the Trap	Matsui Takahiro		
1994	Twin Angels	Onimaru		
1994	Baki the Grappler	Baki Hanma		
1994	Plastic Little	Nichol Hawking		
1995	Vixens	Ujita		
1995	Fire Emblem	Julian		
1997	Jungle de Ikou!	Takuma		
1998	Virgin Fleet	Sada		
1999	Gravitation: Lyrics of Love	Ryuichi Sakuma		
2000-present	Detective Conan series	Shinichi Kudo		
2001	Pocket Monsters: Pikachu no Fuyuyasumi 2001	Delibird		
2002	Futari Ecchi	Yamada (Rika's friend)		
2003	The Boy Who Carried a Guitar: Kikaider vs. Inazuman	Inazuman		
2004	Netrun-mon	BB Runner		
2006	Angel's Feather series	Shou Hamura		
2006	Freedom Project	Biz		
2008	Ranma: Akumu! Shunminkō	Ranma Saotome		
2011	Coicent	White deer		
2021	The Ancient Magus' Bride: The Boy From the West and the Knight of the Mountain Haze	Oberon		

=== Anime films ===
Year	Title	Role	Note	Ref
1989	Kiki's Delivery Service	Tombo		
1991	Ranma ½: Big Trouble in Nekonron, China	Ranma Saotome		
1992	Ranma ½: Nihao My Concubine	Ranma Saotome		
1994	Ranma ½: One Flew Over the Kuno's Nest	Ranma Saotome		
1996	Gokinjo Monogatari	Tsutomu Yamaguchi		
1996	Kindaichi Shōnen no Jikenbo	Hajime Kindaichi	Only this first film	
1997	Case Closed: The Time Bombed Skyscraper	Shinichi Kudo		
1998	Case Closed: The Fourteenth Target	Shinichi Kudo		
1999	Case Closed: The Last Wizard of the Century	Shinichi Kudo, Kaito Kid		
2000	Case Closed: Captured in Her Eyes	Shinichi Kudo		
2000-09; 2011-12; 2016	One Piece series	Usopp		
2001	Doraemon: Nobita and the Winged Braves	Tobio		
2001	Case Closed: Countdown to Heaven	Shinichi Kudo		
2002	Case Closed: The Phantom of Baker Street	Shinichi Kudo		
2002	A Tree of Palme	Roualt		
2002	Bonobono: Kumomo no Ki no Koto	Araiguma-kun		
2003	Detective Conan: Crossroad in the Ancient Capital	Shinichi Kudo		
2004	Dead Leaves	Retro		
2004	Detective Conan: Magician of the Silver Sky	Shinichi Kudo, Kaito Kid		
2005	Detective Conan: Strategy Above the Depths	Shinichi Kudo		
2006	Dōbutsu no Mori	Fūta the Owl		
2006	Detective Conan: The Private Eyes' Requiem	Shinichi Kudo, Kaito Kid		
2007	Detective Conan: Jolly Roger in the Deep Azure	Shinichi Kudo		
2008	Detective Conan: Full Score of Fear	Shinichi Kudo		
2009	Detective Conan: The Raven Chaser	Shinichi Kudo		
2010	Omae Umasou da na	Heart		
2010	Detective Conan: The Lost Ship in the Sky	Shinichi Kudo, Kaito Kid		
2011	Detective Conan: Quarter of Silence	Shinichi Kudo		
2012	Detective Conan: The Eleventh Striker	Shinichi Kudo		
2012	Tiger & Bunny: The Beginning	Robin		
2012	Asura	Kotaro (小太郎, Kotarō)		
2013	Lupin the 3rd vs. Detective Conan: The Movie	Shinichi Kudo, Kaito Kid		
2013	Detective Conan: Private Eye in the Distant Sea	Shinichi Kudo		
2014	Detective Conan: Dimensional Sniper	Shinichi Kudo		
2015	Anata o Zutto Aishiteru	Barudo		
2015	The Boy and the Beast	Jirōmaru – teen		
2015	Detective Conan: Sunflowers of Inferno	Shinichi Kudo, Kaito Kid		
2016	Detective Conan: The Darkest Nightmare	Shinichi Kudo		
2019	Case Closed: The Fist of Blue Sapphire	Shinichi Kudo, Kaito Kid		
2022	Odd Taxi: In the Woods	Kakihana		
2025	Cute High Earth Defense Club Eternal Love!	Aye-aye		
2025	Dive in Wonderland	White Rabbit		

=== Web animation ===
Year	Title	Role	Note	Ref
2008	Ikuze! Gen-san	Genzō Tamura		
2022	JoJo's Bizarre Adventure: Stone Ocean	Yo-Yo Ma		

=== Live action ===
Year	Title	Role	Note	Ref
1998	Godzilla Island	Dogora		
1998	Tetsuwan Tantei Robotack	Torabolt		
1999	Moero!! Robocon	Robopachi		
2003	Pretty Guardian Sailor Moon	Artemis		
2004	Tokusou Sentai Dekaranger	Thousanian Gineka	Ep. 34	
2010	Tensou Sentai Goseiger	Marloid Ain-I of the Neutral (Coro)	Ep. 41	
2013	Unofficial Sentai Akibaranger	Chief Clerk Blu-ray	Ep. 2	
2013	Unofficial Sentai Akibaranger	Chief Editor HVD	Ep. 3	
2014	Zyuden Sentai Kyoryuger vs. Go-Busters: The Great Dinosaur Battle! Farewell Our Eternal Friends	ToQger Equipment Voice		
2014	Ressha Sentai ToQger	Ticket, ToQger Equipment Voice		
2014	Ressha Sentai ToQger Vs. Kamen Rider Gaim Spring Vacation Combining Special	Ticket, ToQger Equipment Voice		
2014	Heisei Rider vs. Shōwa Rider: Kamen Rider Taisen feat. Super Sentai	Ticket, ToQger Equipment Voice		
2014	Ressha Sentai ToQger the Movie: Galaxy Line S.O.S.	Ticket, ToQger Equipment Voice		
2015	Ressha Sentai ToQger vs. Kyoryuger: The Movie	Ticket, ToQger Equipment Voice		
2015	They Went and Came Back Again Ressha Sentai ToQGer: Super ToQ 7gou of Dreams	Ticket, ToQger Equipment Voice		
2016	Shuriken Sentai Ninninger vs. ToQger the Movie: Ninja in Wonderland			
2016	Doubutsu Sentai Zyuohger	Illusion	Ep. 22	

=== Video games ===
Year	Title	Role	Note	Ref
1985	Xanadu: Dragon Slayer II	Arios		
1990	Ranma ½	Ranma Saotome (Male)		
1992	Record of Lodoss War	Etoh		
1994	Record of Lodoss War II	Etoh		
1994	Ranma ½: Chougi Rambuhen	Ranma Saotome (Male)		
1995	Real Bout Fatal Fury	Jin Chonrei, Jin Chonshu		
1995	Fatal Fury 3: Road to the Final Victory	Jin Chonrei, Jin Chonshu		
1995	Imagination Science World Gulliver Boy	Gulliver Toscanni		
1996	Ranma ½ Battle Renaissance	Ranma Saotome		
1996	Crash Bandicoot	Crash Bandicoot	Japanese dub	
1997	Crash Bandicoot 2: Cortex Strikes Back	Crash Bandicoot	Japanese dub	
1997	Hot Shots Golf	Tatsu		
1997	Breath of Fire III	Ryu		
1997	Tengai Makyō: Daiyon no Mokushiroku	Ace/Cherry Abes		
1997	Grandia	Rapp		
1998	Real Bout Fatal Fury Special: Dominated Mind	Jin Chonrei, Jin Chonshu		
1998	Real Bout Fatal Fury 2: The Newcomers	Jin Chonrei, Jin Chonshu		
1998	Thousand Arms	Meis Triumph		
1998	Crash Bandicoot 3: Warped	Crash Bandicoot	Japanese dub	
1999	Crash Team Racing	Crash Bandicoot, Fake Crash	Japanese dub	
2000	Crash Bash	Crash Bandicoot	Japanese dub	
2000	Breath of Fire IV	Ryu		
2001	Crash Bandicoot: The Wrath of Cortex	Crash Bandicoot, Wa-Wa	Japanese dub	
2001	Inuyasha	Inuyasha		
2002	GetBackers Dakkanoku: Ubawareta Mugenshiro	Ginji Amano		
2002	Breath of Fire: Dragon Quarter	Ryu		
2002	Kannagi no Tori	Ryuu Watanuki		
2003	2nd Super Robot Wars Alpha	Tobia Arronax		
2003	One Piece: Grand Battle! 3	Usopp		
2003	Crash Nitro Kart	Crash Bandicoot, Fake Crash		
2003	Angel's Feather	Shō Hamura		
2004	Harry Potter and the Prisoner of Azkaban	Harry Potter	Japanese dub	
2004	Tales of Rebirth	Tytree Crowe		
2004	Inuyasha: The Secret of the Cursed Mask	Inuyasha		
2005	Inuyasha: Feudal Combat	Inuyasha		
2005	Madagascar	Mort	Japanese dub	
2005	Angel's Feather - Kuro no Zanei	Shō Hamura		
2005	NeoGeo Battle Coliseum	Jin Chonrei, Jin Chonshu		
2005	One Piece: Pirates' Carnival	Usopp		
2005	One Piece: Grand Battle!	Usopp		
2005	Fighting for One Piece	Usopp		
2006	Battle Stadium D.O.N	Usopp		
2007	One Piece: Unlimited Adventure	Usopp		
2007	Destroy All Humans!	Cryptosporidium 137	Japanese dub	
2007	Pokémon Mystery Dungeon: Time Exploration Team and Darkness Exploration Team	Hikozaru		
2007	SD Gundam G Generation Spirits	Tobia Arronax, Sai Saici		
2008	L the Prologue to Death Note -Rasen no Trap-	L		
2008	GetAmped2	Jacky Noboru		
2008	Neo Angelique Special	René		
2008	Persona 4	Kuma (Teddie)		
2009	Maji de Watashi ni Koi Shinasai!	Ikurō Fukumoto		
2009	SD Gundam G Generation Wars	Tobia Arronax, Sai Saici		
2010	Mobile Suit Gundam: Extreme Vs.	Tobia Arronax, Sai Saici		
2010	Another Century's Episode: R	Tobia Arronax		
2010	Dangan Ronpa: Academy of Hope and High School Students of Despair	Hifumi Yamada		
2010	Dragon Ball Heroes	Avatar: Majin, Hero-type		
2010	In Search of the Lost Future	Eitarō Kenny Osafune		
2011	Super Robot Taisen Original Generation	Tasuku Shinguji		
2011	SD Gundam G Generation World	Tobia Arronax, Sai Saici		
2011	Ni no Kuni: Wrath of the White Witch	Mark/Philip		
2012	One Piece: Pirate Warriors	Usopp		
2012	Persona 4 Golden	Kuma (Teddie)		
2012	Persona 4 Arena	Kuma (Teddie)		
2013	Persona 4 Arena Ultimax	Kuma (Teddie)		
2013	One Piece: Pirate Warriors 2	Usopp		
2013	One Piece: Unlimited World Red	Usopp		
2013	JoJo's Bizarre Adventure: All Star Battle	Shigekiyo Yangu		
2014	Persona Q: Shadow of the Labyrinth	Kuma/Teddie		
2014	Sonic Boom: Shattered Crystal	Q-N-C	Japanese dub	
2014	Sonic Boom: Rise of Lyric	Q-N-C	Japanese dub	
2015	JoJo's Bizarre Adventure: Eyes of Heaven	Shigekiyo Yangu		
2015	One Piece: Pirate Warriors 3	Usopp		
2016	One Piece: Burning Blood	Usopp		
2016	Breath of Fire 6: Hakuryū no Shugosha-tachi	Ryu		
2017	Neo Angelique: Angel's Tears	René		
2018	Super Smash Bros. Ultimate	Mii Fighter Type 7		
2018	Persona Q2: New Cinema Labyrinth	Kuma (Teddie)		
2018	One Piece: Grand Cruise	Usopp		
2019	One Piece: World Seeker	Usopp		
2019	MapleStory	Male Hoyoung		
2020	Final Fantasy VII Remake	Red XIII		
2020	Ghost of Tsushima	Taka		
2020	One Piece: Pirate Warriors 4	Usopp		
2023	One Piece Odyssey	Usopp		
2023	Final Fantasy VII: Ever Crisis	Red XIII		
2024	Final Fantasy VII Rebirth	Red XIII		
2024	Jujutsu Kaisen: Cursed Clash	Kechizu		
2025	Shuten Order	Arale		

=== Drama CD ===
Year	Title	Role	Note	Ref
2007	Devil May Cry Volume 2	Peter Pan	Episode 1: "Devil's Neverland - Peter Pan	
2015	Dear Vocalist	Panda-shachou		

=== Dubbing roles ===
==== Live-action ====
Year	Dub year	Title	Role	Original actor	Note	Ref
2003	2004	Agent Cody Banks	Cody Banks	Frankie Muniz		
2004	2005	Agent Cody Banks 2: Destination London	Cody Banks	Frankie Muniz		
2005	2008	Charlie and the Chocolate Factory	Mike Teavee	Jordan Fry	NTV edition	
2008	2011	10,000 BC	Baku	Nathanael Baring	TV Asahi edition	
2009	2009	Dragonball Evolution	Goku	Justin Chatwin		
2012-13	2012	Smash	Tom Levitt	Christian Borle		
2017	2017	Journey to the West: The Demons Strike Back	The King	Bao Bei'er		
2019	2021	Vivarium	Tom	Jesse Eisenberg		
2023	2023	Ant-Man and the Wasp: Quantumania	Veb	David Dastmalchian		
2023-present	2023	One Piece	Usopp	Jacob Romero Gibson		

==== Animation ====
Year	Title	Role	Original actor	Note	Ref
1960-89	The Bugs Bunny Show	Bugs Bunny	Mel Blanc		
1982-1983	Shirt Tales	Leknid	Episode: "Shirt Napped"		
1982-1983	Shirt Tales	Sparky	Episode: "Kip's Dragon"		
1993-15	VeggieTales	Larry the Cucumber	Mike Nawrocki		
1995	A Goofy Movie	Max Goof	Jason Marsden		
1996	Space Jam	Bugs Bunny	Billy West		
1996-99	Beast Wars: Transformers	Rattrap	Scott McNeil		
1997-present	South Park	Kyle	Matt Stone	WOWOW dub	
1997-present	South Park	Kyle Broflovski, Craig Tucker	Matt Stone		
1997-present	South Park	Jimmy Valmer, Clyde Donovan, Dougie	Trey Parker		
1997-present	South Park	Sixth Grade Leader	Rochelle Lefler		
2000	An Extremely Goofy Movie	Max Goof	Jason Marsden		
2000	Tweety's High-Flying Adventure	Bugs Bunny	Joe Alaskey		
2000-05	Sealab 2021	Stormy	Ellis Henican		
2001-03	House of Mouse	Max Goof	Jason Marsden		
2002-04	Baby Looney Tunes	Baby Bugs Bunny	Samuel Vincent		
2003	Looney Tunes: Back In Action	Bugs Bunny	Joe Alaskey		
2004	Justice League Unlimited	Booster Gold	Tom Everett Scott		
2004-07	Maya & Miguel	Tito Chavez	Candi Milo		
2005	Madagascar	Mort	Andy Richter		
2007-09	Transformers Animated	Jetfire, Rattle Trap	Tom Kenny		
2008	A Matter of Loaf and Death	Baker Bob	Ben Whitehead		
2008	Madagascar: Escape 2 Africa	Mort	Andy Richter		
2008	The Pirates Who Don't Do Anything: A VeggieTales Movie	Sedgewick	Phil Vischer		
2009-11	Poppets Town	Blooter	Cory Doran		
2010-19	My Little Pony: Friendship Is Magic	Snips	Lee Tockar		
2011	Rio	Blu	Jesse Eisenberg		
2011-14	The Looney Tunes Show	Bugs Bunny	Jeff Bergman		
2012	Madagascar 3: Europe's Most Wanted	Mort	Andy Richter		
2012-17	Teenage Mutant Ninja Turtles	Michelangelo	Greg Cipes		
2013	My Little Pony: Equestria Girls	Snips	Lee Tockar		
2014	My Little Pony: Equestria Girls – Rainbow Rocks	Snips	Lee Tockar		
2014	Penguins of Madagascar	Mort	Andy Richter		
2014	Rio 2	Blu	Jesse Eisenberg		
2018-19	Tinpo	Logipo	Keith Wickham		
2019-present	Helluva Boss	Moxxie	Richard Steven Horvitz		
2021	Space Jam: A New Legacy	Bugs Bunny	Jeff Bergman		
2022	The Bad Guys	Professor Marmalade	Richard Ayoade		

==== Commercials ====
Year	Company	Role	Note	Ref
Burger King	Narrator	Japanese		
M&M's	Red M&M	Japanese; original voice by Billy West		

== Discography ==
=== Audio dramas ===
- 20 Mensou Ni Onegai! (1990), Victor VICL-3001
- Aa Megami-sama Music and Short Story (1991), Keiichi Morisato
- Rockman Kiki Ippatsu Drama (1995), Robo 1
- Princess Quest (1996), Gateau

=== Singles ===
- "Rollin'" (1990), Futureland/Youmex – TYDY-5147
- "Kon'ya ha April Fool" (1991), Pony Canyon – Ranma ½ character single as Ranma Saotome (male)
- "Otousan" (1991), Pony Canyon – Ranma ½ as Ranma Saotome (male), sings "China kara no Tegami" with Megumi Hayashibara
- "Characters Christmas" (1991), Pony Canyon – Ranma ½ as Ranma Saotome (male)
- "Ranma to Akane no Ballad" (1993), Pony Canyon – Ranma ½ as Ranma Saotome (male)
- "Unbalance City" (1996), Nippon Columbia – COCC-13586

=== Albums ===
- Everybody's Christmas (1990) – TYCY-5148
- Twinbeee Paradise Nesshou! Vocal Battle Hen (1994) – Twinbeee Paradise
- Fancy Lala Final Best Selection (1998) – Fancy Lala album
- Shouwa Hit Studio (2011), Enma-kun – Dororon Enma-kun Meeramera
- Futari wa Pretty Cure Splash Star 2nd ED (2006)

== Radio shows ==
- Pure Pure Island (aired for a month in 1998 as a tie-in with the anime series Fancy Lala and was co-hosted with J-pop singer Reiko Ōmori who was also the voice actress who voiced Miho Shinohara)
- Hiroi Ouji's Maruten Cha Cha Cha! (ongoing, co-hosted with voice actress Chisa Yokoyama and Sakura Taisen creator Ohji Hiroi)

== Awards ==
Year	Award	Category	Result
2019	13th Seiyu Awards	Kei Tomiyama Memorial Award	Won
