= Soul Saga: Episode 1 =

- Developer: Disastercake
- Director: Mike Gale
- Producer: Mike Gale
- Designer: Mike Gale
- Programmer: Mike Gale
- Writer: Mike Gale
- Composers: Ryan Camus; Aivi Tran; Surasshu
- Engine: Unity
- Platforms: Microsoft Windows, OS X, Linux, PlayStation 4
- Genre: Role-playing
- Mode: Single-player

Soul Saga: Episode 1 is an adventure JRPG video game developed by Disastercake, with an early access version released on February 28, 2020. Funded through Kickstarter, the game is scheduled for release on Microsoft Windows, macOS, Linux, and PlayStation 4. Disastercake states that the game is influenced by, and will play as, a Japanese role-playing video game, in the vein of Final Fantasy, Suikoden, Breath of Fire, and Persona.

== Gameplay ==
Soul Saga is in early access and frequently making major changes to gameplay elements. It currently has a focus on 3D airship exploration, turn based combat, and minor placeholder story elements. There are plans to add more as development continues.

== Story ==
=== Setting ===
The game takes place in the world of Oterra. In it, due to a natural disaster, the world has been split into three distinct parts; the surface world, simply called Oterra, the floating islands, called Medonia, and the Tempest Reef which acts as a barrier between the other two areas. Episode 1 takes place in Medonia; where the floating islands are slowly losing their energy, and as such, ability to continue to remain afloat.

=== Characters ===
The game stars the main character Mithos, whose father was a great guild leader who disappeared when on the quest to defeat the king of dragons. As such, Mithos also aspires to be a great guild leader and eventually attempt to take on the job his father could not complete. He sets off on an adventure to travel the world with his best friend Elise, who is an engineer.

== Development ==
=== Planning ===
The game's development began in earnest back in 2008 by Disastercake's sole member, Mike Gale. However, progress was generally slow, as Gale's primary focus was concentrating on working at Microsoft as a contracted game tester, and then left to obtain a business degree. Gale initially envisioned the game to run on 2D graphics, however, he became dissatisfied with the low-quality output he was able to get with outsourcing the work on such a small budget. The move to 3D graphics brought the game back to his desired quality standards, but far exceeded his budget constraints. Upon being unable to resolve the two, he decided to turn to Kickstarter for funding in 2013.

=== Kickstarter pitch ===
Soul Saga's Kickstarter campaign was started in June 2013 with an initial goal of $60,000. By June 26, $48,000 had been raised, and by June 28, it had already exceeded its $60,000 goal. The campaign ended on July 15, 2013, with 5,631 backers pledging a total of $195,528. With the Kickstarter funds, Soul Saga was able to enhance its visuals based on player feedback. The original 3D "chibi" art style proposed was replaced with models that more closely resembled the 2D art. The standard proportions still maintained a cartoony feel to the color palettes and character designs. The 2D art was always pitched at more standard proportions, and has remained as such. The original Kickstarter designs will still be in Soul Saga as optional outfits for players who would like to experience it that way.

Soul Saga was pitched as a traditional role-playing video game in the vein of the Final Fantasy, Suikoden, Breath of Fire, and Persona video game series. Battles would be initiated similarly to Chrono Trigger, where combat begins upon the player directing the character into an enemy in the world map. Once initiated, combat consists of a turn based battle system similar to Final Fantasy X. The game also planned to have airship battles, similar to Skies of Arcadia.

Exploration of the overworld map was mentioned to also be a major aspect of gameplay, with the player being able to explore on foot similarly to Final Fantasy VII, and by airship similarly to Skies of Arcadia.

=== Early access ===
After roughly seven years of development time, the game received an early access release on Steam. The game currently still does not have a firm final release date.
