= Angel's Feather =

2003 video game

- Group shot of characters

エンジェルズフェザー
- Genre: Action, Drama, Fantasy, Romance, Yaoi / Shōnen-ai.
- Video game
- Developer: BlueImpact
- Publisher: BlueImpact, Studio e.go! (Windows/PS2); KID (PS2)
- Genre: Role-playing, Visual novel Eroge (Windows)
- Platform: Microsoft Windows (Windows 98, Windows Me, Windows 2000, Windows XP) PlayStation 2
- Released: April 25, 2003 (Windows); March 11, 2004 (PS2)
- Video game

Angel's Feather: Kuro no Zanei
- Developer: HuneX
- Publisher: GN Software
- Genre: Role-playing, Visual novel
- Platform: PlayStation 2
- Released: June 30, 2005
- Original video animation
- Directed by: Yasuhiro Kuroda
- Produced by: Kenichi Matsuzawa
- Written by: Akiko Horii
- Studio: VENET
- Licensed by: NA: AnimeWorks
- Released: April 4, 2006 – May 26, 2006
- Episodes: 2

Angel's Feather (エンジェルズフェザー, Enjeruzu Fezā) is a Japanese boys' love visual novel game created by BlueImpact, which was originally released on April 25, 2003, for Windows, and later ported to the PlayStation 2 by HuneX as Angel's Feather: Kuro no Zanei. In 2006, it was adapted into an OVA, which was animated by Studio Venet. The game's character designer is Yamamoto Kazue. In 2007, Media Blasters licensed the anime for Region 1 release.

== Story ==
It begins when Hamura Shou comes to Yuusei Academy, from there it branches out into the truth behind his past, and his twin brother, Kai's as well (though they both have the same name, they are referenced differently). It also portrays shōnen-ai between Kai and Nagi (his supposed best friend).

== Characters ==
Shou Hamura
Voiced by: Kappei Yamaguchi

Shou Hamura (羽村 翔) is the older twin of Kai, despite looking younger. He came to the Yuusei Academy for boys as a sports student. In the beginning, when Shou mentioned that his lost twin brother, Kai was in the same school, Shou went looking for Kai first, only to find out that Kai had completely forgotten about his older twin. Shou was adopted into a wealthy family, but unfortunately, his parents were killed in an accident. Despite this tragedy of losing his adoptive parents, he wields the personality as a strong, courageous, happy and friendly boy. He is the leader of the kendo team in his school, as well as being a prince of the Winfield kingdom, giving him his white wings on his back. Shou's appearance is usually a boy with short, linen blonde hair, green eyes and fair skin. Shou shares the same birth date with Kai, March 7. He Is shown to be a typical dumb shounen protagonist.

Kai Misonou
Voiced by: Hikaru Midorikawa

Kai Misonou (御園生 櫂) is Shou's younger twin. Kai starts off seeing his forgotten twin brother, and has a blurry memory of the time with Shou while they were at the orphanage before Kai was adopted into a wealthy family which runs the Misonou Combine. What caused Kai to forget Shou is that Shou had told Kai to forget about him completely so Kai will not get sad about saying farewell to his beloved twin. Kai is in a relationship with his best friend Nagi, who was found in a faculty since they were small. Kai's family is controlled by Ran, who is Reiya's retainer, which is how Kai knows Ran. After Nagi was killed (later revealed that Nagi survived, but had supposedly sustained amnesia), Kai went berserk, but got saved by his older twin. It was later mentioned that Kai switched his school to the Yuusei Academy because of his excellent grades. Kai is also a prince of the Winfield kingdom, giving him the same white wings as his twin brother, and fights by using magic. There are some hints that Kai and Shou are fraternal twins. They share the same eye color and hair color. The difference is that Kai has sharper eyes, longer hair and a deeper voice than his twin brother. Kai has the same birth date as Shou.

Kurisu (Christopher) Ousaka
Voiced by: Chihiro Suzuki

His full name is Christopher. Kurisu is Shou and Kai's cousin, his father's brother was the father of Kai and Shou. He is the Crown Prince of Winfield Kingdom. In episode 1, Chris is seen as a roommate with Kai, although it seems that there's more to their relationship. Like his cousins, Chris is white-winged, and later escapes with Sena and Shion from Winfield Kingdom. His birthday is on October 12. His appearance is silver hair with Heterochromia iridium (Gold on the left eye, Blue on the right eye)

Naoto Aoki
Voiced by: Daisuke Kishio

Naoto is Shou's best friend and knew Shou before he moved to Yuusei academy and is also in the kendo club with Shou. He is later revealed as a black-winged; the royal white-winged's enemy. For this, Shou's feelings are badly hurt for losing his best friend. He is shown with brown hair and green eyes.

Nagi Uesugi
Voiced by: Takurou Nakakuni

Nagi is Kai's "only friend" and may be in a relationship with Kai. He appears near the end of the 1st episode. He vows to protect Kai from anyone who hurts him, He hates Shou for hurting Kai. In episode 2 he is apparently "killed" to protect Kai from his own attack when he is controlled by Ran. Nagi was awakened as a black-winged in episode 2. He has cream coloured hair and brown eyes.

Yuuto Nakajyou
Voiced by: Wataru Hatano

He's the dorm leader, and worries about the occupants of the dorm. He has special abilities that allows him to see Nagi's desire of wanting to protect Kai in the 2nd episode. He is shown with glasses, indigo hair and purple eyes.

Anri Chikura
Voiced by: Kōki Miyata

He is a friend of Shou who continuously repeats words at least three times. Though kind-hearted, he is not very bright. He plays the flute to heal Shou's wounds in the first episode, and to get rid of monsters such as the werewolves in the second episode. It is possible that Anri is a distant cousin of Shou, Kai and Kurisu because of his small white wings. Anri has white hair and gold eyes, and wears glasses.

Sena Mizuochi
Voiced by: Yasunori Masutani

Sena is a soldier of Winfield Kingdom, and one of the protectors of Kurisu. He is also the counselor of the shooting club at Yuusei academy. A blue bird named Pipi is often seen with him. Sena has red hair and blue eyes.

Shion Toudou
Voiced by: Hirotaka Suzuoki (PC First Game) Hideo Ishikawa (PS2 Second Game)

He is the commanding officer of the imperial guard to the kingdom and another protector of Kurisu. He is a teacher at the academy. He is quite calm and is loyal to Kurisu. Shion has black hair and brown eyes.

Reiya Wakabayashi
Voiced by: Kazuhiko Inoue

He is the Commander of the Black Wings and also the director of the school. He is the one controlling Kai as a puppet, he also secretly controls Misonou Combine. Ran is his lover and trusted retainer. He has long silver hair and brown eyes.

Ran Sakakibara
Voiced by: Jūrōta Kosugi

He is the homeroom teacher of Kai and the others. He is also a black-winged and the trusted trainer and lover of the commander of the black-wings. It is later revealed that he is the true main antagonist. He has indigo hair with a large left bang and brown eyes, he wears glasses in his human form.

Kaoru Kimura
Voiced By: Tomokazu Sugita

Shou’s old Kendo master from Middle School. He has spiky black hair and brown eyes.

Karen Neyagawa
Voiced by: Junji Majima

Ruka Niijima
Voiced by: Yuci

Polyana Ninihopetestu
Voiced by: LoLo sama

Mitsugi Kyouhei
Voiced by: Tetsuya Kakihara

He has a book about Winfield Kingdom, he was curious about the monster that he and Shou encountered during the first episode. Near the ending of the 2nd episode OVA, he was able to visit Winfield Kingdom after he and Yuuto didn't join Shou and the others to find the Black-wings. He is introduced in the first episode bullying Anri. He also seems to be the narrator of the story. Kyouhei has blue hair and light blue eyes.

== Media information ==
Anime opening theme song: "Rock Star" by Kakihara Tetsuya & Hatano Wataru

Anime ending theme song: "Last Song" by Ishikawa Hideo & Suzuki Chihiro

== Reception ==
Helen McCarthy put the OVA into her book 500 Essential Anime Movies.
