= Breath of Fire =

Role-playing video game series developed by Capcom

- Genre: Role-playing
- Developer: Capcom
- Publisher: Capcom
- Creators: Yoshinori Kawano; Tokuro Fujiwara; Makoto Ikehara
- Platforms: SNES, PlayStation, Game Boy Advance, PlayStation 2, Microsoft Windows, PlayStation Portable, Android, iOS
- First release: Breath of Fire; April 3, 1993
- Latest release: Breath of Fire 6 February 24, 2016

Breath of Fire (Note: In Japanese: ブレスオブファイア (Buresu obu Faia)) is a role-playing video game series developed by Capcom. It originated on the Super Nintendo Entertainment System in 1993. The series has recurring characters and ambiguous continuity; though each game is its own self-contained story, the names of the two lead characters are usually Ryu and Nina.

The story commonly involves an adventurer named Ryu (name usually changeable) who can shapeshift into different types of dragons. Over the course of his journey, he befriends Nina, a girl with wings. At its inception, Breath of Fire took place in a medieval fantasy style fictional world. Following the mainstream success of Japanese role-playing games in the 1990s, the series began using the original anime-style artwork for later Western releases of the games (rather than the Westernized art that was drawn specifically for the Western releases of the first two games), post-apocalyptic themes, and an increased emphasis on character development. Despite these changes, the core structure of Breath of Fire remains largely linear and plot-focused. As of 2016, six Breath of Fire titles have been released, with three games being ported to handheld game consoles as well as Nintendo's Virtual Console, and two ported to the Nintendo Switch's Super NES games library. By 2022, the series had sold over 3.3 million copies. Most recently, Breath of Fire 4 was ported to PC by Good Old Games in 2025.

== Games ==
=== Main series ===
Title	Original release date		
Title	Japan	North America	PAL region
Breath of Fire	April 3, 1993	August 10, 1994	December 14, 2001 (Game Boy Advance)
Notes: Released on Super Nintendo Entertainment System; Developed by Capcom; SNES version translated and published in North America by Square Soft; Also available on Game Boy Advance (2001); Known in Japan as Breath of Fire: Ryū no Senshi
Breath of Fire II	December 2, 1994	December 10, 1995	April 25, 1996
Notes: Released on Super Nintendo Entertainment System; Developed by Capcom; Also available on Game Boy Advance (2001); Known in Japan as Breath of Fire II: Sadame no Ko
Breath of Fire III	September 11, 1997	April 30, 1998	October 8, 1998
Notes: Released on PlayStation; Developed by Capcom; Also available on PlayStation Portable (2005)
Breath of Fire IV	April 27, 2000	November 28, 2000	August 3, 2001
Notes: Released on PlayStation; Developed by Capcom; Also available on Microsoft Windows (2003); Known in Japan as Breath of Fire IV: Utsurowazaru Mono
Breath of Fire: Dragon Quarter	November 14, 2002	February 16, 2003	November 28, 2003
Notes: Released on PlayStation 2; Developed by Capcom; Known in Japan as Breath of Fire V: Dragon Quarter
Breath of Fire 6: Hakuryū no Shugosha-tachi	February 24, 2016	none	none
Notes: Released on Microsoft Windows and Android; Developed by Capcom; Also available on iOS (2016); Known in Japan as Breath of Fire 6: Hakuryū no Shugosha-tachi

=== Mobile games ===
Beginning in November 2003, Capcom began releasing Breath of Fire titles specifically for mobile phone devices in Japan. Each game was developed for use on NTT DoCoMo, au, and SoftBank brand cellphones that use the i-mode, EZWEB, or BREW services. The first title, Breath of Daifugō (ブレス オブ 大富豪), is a replication of the Japanese card game daifugō featuring characters from Breath of Fire IV, and would be followed by a sports game called Breath of Fire: Ryū no Tsurishi (ブレス オブ ファイア 竜の釣り師, lit. Breath of Fire: Dragon Fisherman) in October 2005, which contained an expanded version of the fishing minigame also from the game. Two action role-playing spin-offs of Breath of Fire IV titled Breath of Fire IV: Honō no Ken to Kaze no Mahō (ブレスオブファイアIV 炎の剣と風の魔法, lit. Breath of Fire IV: The Sword of Fire and the Magic of Wind) and Breath of Fire IV: Yōsei-tachi to Hikari no Kagi (ブレスオブファイアIV 妖精たちと光のカギ, lit. Breath of Fire IV: The Faeries and the Key of Light)' were released in November 2007 and November 2008 respectively.

== Music ==
The music of each Breath of Fire games has traditionally been produced by rotating members of Capcom's in-house sound team. While the themes from first game were composed by five members of the company's sound team Alph Lyla, which included Yasuaki Fujita, Mari Yamaguchi, Minae Fuji, Yoko Shimomura and Tatsuya Nishimura, the second game's score was produced entirely by fellow company composer Yuko Takehara. Breath of Fire III's soundtrack took a jazz-inspired approach, and was written by the team of Yoshino Aoki and Akari Kaida, with the music of Breath of Fire IV provided solely by Aoki herself. For the first time in the series, the music of Breath of Fire: Dragon Quarter was created by an outside employee, Hitoshi Sakimoto, with Yasunori Mitsuda serving as music producer on the project.

In March 2006, Capcom released the 11-disc Breath of Fire Original Soundtrack Special Box boxset on their in-house record label Suleputer, which contained all music from the first five games in the series. The set includes the first-ever soundtrack release of the original Breath of Fire, as well as the first complete soundtrack releases for Breath of Fire II and Breath of Fire III, which had previously only received single-disc selections during their original printings, with a total of 307 tracks from all five titles. Capcom produced a limited run of only 2000 copies of the boxset, which was distributed on their online store e-Capcom, as well as special retailers, and included a 28-page booklet featuring art from the series.

== Reception ==
Review scores and sales
Game	First-year sales (Japan only)	Famitsu	GameRankings	Metacritic
Breath of Fire	—	—	70%	79% (GBA Re-release)
Breath of Fire II	350,000	—	76%	81% (GBA Re-release)
Breath of Fire III	425,000	28 / 40	74%	—
Breath of Fire IV	334,000	31 / 40	82%	83%
Breath of Fire: Dragon Quarter	140,073	32 / 40	78%	78%

As of the fifth game in the series, the Breath of Fire franchise has sold a total of 3.2 million units worldwide, with Capcom calling it their "best known and most successful role-playing game." Sales of each successive title continued on an upward slope which peaked at the PlayStation entries in the series, with the fifth game, Breath of Fire: Dragon Quarter on the PlayStation 2, representing a significant dip. Each title received mostly positive reviews from aggregate review websites GameRankings and Metacritic, with critics such as Gamasutra finding each game to be good, but largely formulaic, calling the franchise "always solid, if not particularly ambitious". The series has routinely been compared to Square Enix's popular Final Fantasy games, with GameSpot stating that "Though the Breath of Fire games have never been as well received as bigger RPG names like Final Fantasy, the series indicates that Capcom is definitely learning something about the fine art of RPG development."

In May 2009, nearly seven years after the release of the latest game, Breath of Fire: Dragon Quarter, readers of Japanese Famitsu magazine voted the series 6th in the publication's survey of the Top 50 Most Wanted Game Sequels. IGN would later name Breath of Fire the 4th greatest Capcom franchise of all time in June 2010, stating that "Though the Breath of Fire games evolved across the SNES to the PlayStation 2, the core held steadfast to Japanese RPG formulas – something that many gamers still celebrate."

=== Series future ===
In a December 2008 interview with gaming website 1UP.com, Capcom's Head of Research and Development Keiji Inafune stated the Breath of Fire series would be put on hiatus due to the company's lack of staff and an increasingly competitive role-playing game market: "There are currently no plans on making a new Breath of Fire game. Apart from that, regarding RPG titles, they are very popular in Japan, but only certain RPG titles sell so Capcom doesn't really need to even consider making these titles as an option." Capcom USA Vice President of Strategic Planning Chris Svensson stated on the company's official message boards in June 2009 that the series remains a "resting IP". Other companies such as Camelot Software Planning have expressed interest in developing a title for the series if Capcom remained unwilling to do so.

=== Appearances in other media ===
Breath of Fire would later be featured in Archie Comics' Worlds Unite crossover event as one of several Capcom and Sega guest franchises appearing in the company's Sonic the Hedgehog and Mega Man titles.

Between August 26 - September 2, 2020, an online survey was held for Teppen players, one of the questions featured asked which Capcom characters or series the community would like to see, Breath of Fire was one of the options players could select, and it was also possible to type in specific names within the question. On July 1, 2021, Breath of Fire was added to Teppen via its Dragons of War expansion. Nina was added as a skin for the playable character Jill Valentine, she is voiced by Abby Trott (English) and Kyoko Hikami (Japanese). Her theme song is a remix of the soundtrack titled "Battle for Tomorrow" from Breath of Fire III. In addition, the card pack features multiple characters, enemies and concepts from Breath of Fire.
