= Breath of Fire IV =

2000 video game

- North American PlayStation cover art
- Developer: Capcom Development Studio 3
- Publishers: WW: Capcom; JP: SourceNext (PC)
- Producer: Hironobu Takeshita
- Designer: Makoto Ikehara
- Artist: Tatsuya Yoshikawa
- Writer: Makoto Ikehara
- Composers: Yoshino Aoki; Taro Iwashiro (opening)
- Series: Breath of Fire
- Platforms: PlayStation, Windows
- Release: PlayStation: JP: April 27, 2000; NA: November 29, 2000; EU: August 3, 2001; Microsoft Windows: JP: May 30, 2003; EU: September 10, 2003; WW: April 25, 2025
- Genre: Role-playing
- Mode: Single-player

Breath of Fire IV (Note: Released in Japan as Breath of Fire IV: Utsoruwazaru Mono (ブレス オブ ファイアIV うつろわざるもの, Buresu Obu Faia Fō Utsurowazaru Mono; Breath of Fire IV: The Unfading Ones)) is a role-playing video game developed by Capcom, and is the fourth game in the Breath of Fire series. It was originally released for the PlayStation in Japan and North America in 2000, and Europe in 2001. The game was later released for Windows in Europe and Japan in 2003. An enhanced PC port was released in 2025 via GOG.com.

Just as in previous games of the series, Breath of Fire IV follows the adventures of a young man named Ryu, who has the power to transform into powerful dragons. The Ryu in this game must team up with several other skilled warriors to combat an awakened immortal emperor from ascending to godhood and destroying the world of man. Like Breath of Fire III, the game utilizes a mix of two and three-dimensional computer graphics and turn-based battle sequences.

== Gameplay ==
Breath of Fire IV is a traditional role-playing video game with an overhead viewpoint. The game's camera can be manually rotated by the player up to a full 360 degrees in some instances, though unlike Breath of Fire III it cannot be tilted up or down. The game environment is rendered in full 3D, while characters are presented as two-dimensional hand-drawn sprites. While moving about the world, players can interact with computer-controlled characters and objects, gain knowledge about the world around them, and gather clues on how to advance the story. Each playable character is given a special "field skill" that can be used to destroy obstacles or solve puzzles outside of battles, which occur randomly in hostile areas or dungeons.

A battle sequence

The "Master System" from Breath of Fire III returns, allowing players to customize each character by having them apprentice under different masters found throughout the world. Under their guidance, these characters may gain new skills and special statistic increases by fulfilling certain tasks, such as participating in a certain number of battles, or finding specific items. The fishing mini-game common to the rest of the series also returns, along with the village-building Faerie Town feature from the previous title that allows players to construct a special village that opens new features.

Battles take place with teams of three characters against any number of enemy opponents. During these combat sequences, the player can choose which characters will perform an action in any order, as well as switch in any available reserve characters from the back row. While positioned in the back row, a character may not participate in battle, but may regain lost health or magic every combat round, as well as become unaffected by any attacks. Battles end when either all enemies are defeated, or all playable characters (both the front row and reserve) are out of health. Each battle yields experience points that go toward earning levels for each character, which in turn grants increased statistics and new skills.

New to Breath of Fire IV is the Combo System, which allows certain spells or skills to be cast in a specific order to gain bonus damage or other effects. Casting two ice spells in sequence, for example, will produce a stronger ice attack, while a fire spell followed by a wind spell will create an explosion-based attack. Combos may also automatically occur in single attacks that have more than one effect.

== Plot ==
=== Characters ===
The principal characters of Breath of Fire IV were designed by series artist Tatsuya Yoshikawa, and consist of Ryu and his companions, each with their own individual skills and personality traits carry the story forward. Ryu (voiced by Kappei Yamaguchi) is an amnesic young man with the mysterious ability to transform into powerful dragons, with his "other half" being Fou-Lu (voiced by Isshin Chiba), the principal antagonist and founder of the Fou Empire centuries ago with similar abilities, yet a much more malevolent personality. Aiding Ryu on his quest to confront Fou-Lu are several other heroes including Nina (voiced by Kyoko Hikami), a winged magic-user and the reigning princess of the Kingdom of Wyndia; Cray (voiced by Isshin Chiba), a burly member of the cat-like Woren tribe who wields a large wooden post and holds romantic feelings for Nina's sister, Elina; Ershin (Master in the Japanese version, voiced by Inuko Inuyama), an enigmatic robot-like armor who speaks in third-person; Scias (voiced by Unshō Ishizuka), a lanky mercenary and swordsman from the dog-like Grassrunner clan who lives for money; and Ursula (voiced by Kumiko Watanabe), prideful granddaughter of a military commander with kitsune-like features and skilled with guns.

Tatsuya Yoshikawa's character designs for Breath of Fire IV

Primary supporting characters include Yohm, a general from the modern Fou Imperial Army with the ability to summon monsters to his aid who see Fou-Lu as a threat to the world; Rasso, an elitist company commander dispatched to the Eastern Kingdoms to search for Ryu, Fou-Lu's key to obtaining his lost godhood; Yuna, a cruel geneticist and occultist who participates in horrific acts of genetic manipulation with dark magic; and Kahn, a muscle-bound chauvinist and comic-relief villain who constantly encounters Ryu's party.

=== Backstory ===
A long time ago an emperor called Muuru was having problems with the empire which was in a civil war, so he tried to summon a god named アルカイ「arukai」 (which was translated as Yorae) to unify the empire through its divinity. The summoning was imperfect, which made the god to be split both in time and bodies. The summoned god was called Fou-Lu. After ten years he was able to unify the western continent into the Fou empire. Meanwhile, the western continent was repeatedly attacked by the eastern continent, so Fou-Lu decided to create a bridge that would transport people and things to the other continent. Carrying the ambitions of Muuru, Fou-Lu wanted to unify both continents and cease the war. But due to the imperfect summoning Fou-Lu entered a sleeping state (sealed) and the empire lost its strike on the eastern continent keeping the war in a deadlock. Without Fou-lu's presence the war kept going on for many years of truces and war. Several years later, the second half of the god came into the world, waking up Fou-Lu that was sealed in a long sleep recovering his powers. And so the game begins...

=== Story ===
The story of Breath of Fire IV begins with a search team consisting of Nina, princess of the Kingdom of Wyndia, and Cray, leader from the plains-dwelling Woren clan. They are heading to the town Synesta for information on the whereabouts of Nina's older sister and Cray's love interest, Elina, who went missing several weeks earlier on a diplomatic mission. They are soon attacked by a berserk dragon and their sandflier crashes, forcing Nina to go to Sarai for spare parts while Cray guards their ride. Happening upon a crater left when a strange object landed from the sky, Nina confronts a large dragon who transforms before her eyes into a young man. Remembering nothing other than his name, Ryu, Nina surmises he must have amnesia and persuades him to help her search for her sister. Meanwhile, across the world in the western Fou Empire, the ancient Emperor Fou-Lu rises from his burial tomb, declaring that it is now his time to regain his throne, as he promised over six centuries ago. He commands one of his Guardian dogs, Won-Qu, to guard the tomb before heading south. In his vulnerable, newly awakened state, he is attacked by Yohm, a general in the modern Fou army who is privy to Fou-Lu's long-prophesied resurrection, and aims to kill him before carrying out his plan. Fou-Lu is overpowered in the struggle and is struck down into a ravine.

Elsewhere, Ryu and Nina run into trouble with a Fou Empire captain named Rasso and cannot get the needed spare parts in the end. While escaping the Fou soldiers, they travel to a town blighted by an evil miasma known as "hex" to get back to Cray, where they meet Ershin, a mysterious robot-like armor who leads them through the poisoned side of town. Re-uniting with Cray, the team makes their way west to gather more information. The story shifts back to Fou-Lu, who has awakened after his ordeal with Yohm and finds himself in the care of a man named Bunyan. After recovering enough, Fou-Lu departs down the mountain only to find Yohm and his soldiers blocking the path. After a struggle, Fou-Lu is forced to flee by transforming into a dragon and flying away, declaring that he must find his "other half", Ryu, and re-unite with him before the Empire finds him first. Yohm summons another creature to chase and strike Fou-Lu down. It succeeds and Fou-Lu crashes into the forest below.

By this time, Ryu and his friends arrive at the border town of Kyojin, where they meet Captain Rasso again who attempts to block them from entering the Causeway's gates. Quickly escaping past the guards in Fou Empire's continent, the team make their way north where they meet Yuna, an Imperial scientist who knows of Elina. He claims that she was here but is no longer. The soldiers then capture and return them to the Eastern Lands with accusations of breaking the pre-war peace treaty by trespassing in their lands. The group is detained in the town of Ludia and Cray is set to stand trial on their behalf. The group tries to help by "lessening the evidence" against Cray but to no effect with the judge. With no other choice Ryu, Nina and Ershin break him out of captivity with the help of Scias, a tall, dog-like mercenary who joins their cause. Determined to clear their names and find Elina, they travel past a swamp and through a volcano to arrive in Wyndia, where after an audience with Nina's father, the king, the group continues west. After seeking the Wind Dragon at the top of an ancient temple and brought to an ancient summoners' village, the group learns of Ryu's heritage, why the Empire is after Ryu, and the danger he would be in should he and Fou-Lu ever meet. They also learn that Ershin is carrying an Endless' spirit named Deis. While the group learns all this, Captain Rasso tracks Ryu to the summoners' village and kills most of the villagers. They then meet Ursula, granddaughter of a high-ranking Fou Empire official, who is against Rasso's savage methods. After attacking the villagers, Captain Rasso pulls out his trump card against Ryu. Ryu goes berserk and incinerates all the soldiers and Rasso and almost kills Ursula too, but Nina manages to calm Ryu down. Before leaving for Kyojin again along the western border, Ursula joins the group to keep an eye on them. Learning that the Causeway broke down after their initial visit, they find that they need a ship in order to proceed with their journey.

However, when the gang reaches the western continent, they find it in chaos. Strange, inexplicable things are occurring there, most of them happening in the city of Astana, where the Imperial Headquarters are situated. When they search the Imperial Headquarters, they find it horrifically transformed. When they are unable to pass through a certain obstacle, Elina's voice suddenly rings out, telling them that they cannot pass without first acquiring the Dragonslayer, a sword that is currently in the keeping of Yuna. Tracking Yuna down to a nearby city, Ryu attacks him, forcing him to discard the Dragonslayer. The party returns to Astana, but an atrocity occurs there: unbeknownst to the party, Yuna had the idea of modifying Elina's body and transform her into an artificial Endless but unexpectedly fused her with the Imperial headquarters. Elina has no wish to exist in this form, so she begs Cray to kill her with the Dragonslayer. After an internal debate, he complies, destroying the Imperial Headquarters and dealing a devastating blow to party morale.

After regaining their composure, Ryu and his team travel to the Emperor's pagoda to stop him, and find Ursula's adopted grandfather, General Rhuh, holding off several monsters and A-Tur charging the palace area. Dying in the struggle, Ursula's grandfather tells his daughter to stop Fou-Lu with her new friends, and restore the empire to its former glory. She agrees, and the group makes their way to the palace's inner sanctum, where Ryu personally confronts Fou-Lu and questions his motivation to destroy humanity after they have done so much for him in the past, recalling and comparing their memories. After an intense battle, Fou-Lu finally understands Ryu's defense and merges with Ryu to become the complete Yorae Dragon God, which decides to send the gods back to their own world. Then Ryu rejoins the group as a mortal, and they leave the palace together.

There is an alternative ending of the story where Fou-Lu absorbs Ryu, making him the dominant half where he then plans to destroy humanity, starting by killing Ryu's friends.

The manga adaptation, Utsurowazaru Mono: Breath Of Fire IV, gives a third ending with Ryu refusing to fully absorb Fou-Lu as the gods disappear from the world. While Ryu's friends wait hopefully for his return, he and Fou-Lu are wandering the world side by side as mortals, both relearning and experiencing the joys of humanity.

== Development ==
Breath of Fire IV was developed by Capcom Development Studio 3, which contained many of the same staff members who produced Breath of Fire III, including director Makoto Ikehara, and character artist Tatsuya Yoshikawa, who provided designs for the game's hand-drawn sprites. In May 1999 industry rumors began speculating that the title would appear on the PlayStation 2 console when Capcom's Yoshiki Okamoto remarking that their next role-playing game would be a "giant project" that would make use of the system's network capabilities. The following July, however, it was confirmed that the game would instead be heading to the original PlayStation, with development having been underway for "some time" beforehand, and was officially unveiled in an issue of Japanese Weekly Famitsu magazine the same month. Due to time constraints, some intended features were not included in the final release of the game, including a scenario that would have involved defeating Yuna, an antagonist who otherwise lives in the end. The title would appear at the 2000 Tokyo Game Show trade show in Japan, and would later be released in the region the following April.

In February 2000, Capcom USA officially announced that an English version of the game would be made available in North America. This version would contain a number of differences from the Japanese release, including the censorship of four different scenes that take place during the game that involved Fou-Lu decapitating Emperor Soniel, Ryu spying on Nina and Ursula bathing in a pond, Ryu accidentally grabbing Ursula's breast, and Ursula dropping her pants on a dare. One of Scias's abilities, Shikibetsu (しきべつ, literally, "Identify"), which allowed him to view the statistics of an enemy during battle, as well as a short description of their abilities, was also completely removed. Exclusive to the Japanese version was also a hidden store area that was accessible only by using a save file on a CD distributed through an issue of the Dengeki PlayStation magazine.

In May 2003, Breath of Fire IV was ported to Windows-based personal computers in Japan by SourceNext. This version, though identical to the PlayStation release, contains a filter for sprite smoothing on 2D visuals, as well as shorter load times. The PC version was released in English exclusively for European audiences the following September. The PC version saw a limited release in certain regions of Europe and Australia, while the Japanese version sold enough copies to qualify for the "Quality1980" label, and was subsequently re-released on July 8, 2005.

An enhanced PC port was released in April 2025 onto GOG.com, featuring better compatibility and fixes on PC, Windows 10 & 11 support, English and Japanese localizations, upgraded DirectX rendering, new display options (Windowed Mode, V-Sync, Anti-Aliasing, refined gamma correction) and a reworked audio engine (with restored missing environmental sounds & added new sound configuration options).

=== Audio ===
The music of Breath of Fire IV was composed entirely by Yoshino Aoki, who had previously collaborated with Akari Kaida on the soundtrack to Breath of Fire III. Aoki would also provide the vocals for the game's ending theme, "Yume no Sukoshi Ato" (ゆめのすこしあと, literally, "A Little After the Dream"), and would write an arrangement of Maurice Ravel's "Pavane pour une infante défunte" titled "Pavane for a Dead Princess", while composer Taro Iwashiro provides the game's opening theme song "Breath of Fire IV ~Opening Animation~". In May 2000, Capcom would release the Breath of Fire IV Original Soundtrack on the company's in-house music label Suleputer, which contained all music from the game across two discs. In June 2006, the entire soundtrack would be re-released as part of the Breath of Fire Original Soundtrack Special Box box set, which contained music from the first five games in the series.

== Reception ==
Reception

Aggregate scores
Aggregator	Score
GameRankings	82%
Metacritic	83%

Review scores
Publication	Score
Electronic Gaming Monthly	7.5 / 10
Eurogamer	8 / 10
Famitsu	31 / 40
Game Informer	8.5 / 10
GamePro	5 / 5
GameRevolution	B+
GameSpot	7.5 / 10
IGN	8.2 / 10
Next Generation	4/5
PlayStation: The Official Magazine	9 / 10
Absolute PlayStation	93%
GamePlay RPG	91%

Award
Publication	Award
GamePro	Editor's Choice

Breath of Fire IV was well received during its original release in Japan, earning a 31 out of 40 from Weekly Famitsu magazine. The game was the best-seller of July 2000, and would go on to sell an estimated 334,000 copies in the region in 2000, which would qualify it for Sony's "PlayStation the Best" label, allowing it to be re-released in September 2002 at a reduced price.

The game's English release in North America and Europe met with a similarly good response, with GamePro Magazine awarding it a 5 out of 5 and an Editor's Choice award, claiming "If you believe Final Fantasy IX is the last word in RPGs this year, think again," citing the game's "well-illustrated" graphics and "beautiful score" as its high points. Eurogamer conversely stated that "It may not have the looks and sheen of Final Fantasy, and it certainly doesn't equal it in tale," calling attention to the game's "predictable" plot, but concludes that Breath of Fire IV "remains an extremely compelling and often rewarding RPG". GameSpot called the title "as solid of a game as any of its predecessors" but found it to be lacking in innovation, claiming that "though it doesn't improve upon the standard RPG formula, it's hard to fault in any specific way." IGN found the game's graphics to be "colorful and cute, but something [I]'d like to see improved upon if and when a fifth game comes out", and faulted the game for its "irritating" camera system. The game placed 6th in PSM's "Best Games of 2000" awards feature, with the editors claiming that "[We]'ve always been fans of the Breath of Fire series, and part IV might be the best one yet."

While some critics praised the game's two dimensional graphics as "visually breathtaking", and "the most arresting of any game in the series", others such as IGN found them too stale and grainy, yet still a marked improvement over Breath of Fire III. The return of series mainstays such as the fishing minigame and dragon transformations was seen as a welcome recurrence, and though the title brought many new changes to the series, it did nothing to change the standard role-playing game formula. The game's camera, while able to be rotated at any time, was often seen as cumbersome given the tight spaces most environments were rendered in.

Francesca Reyes reviewed the PlayStation version of the game for Next Generation, rating it four stars out of five, and stated that "A quirky but memorable RPG that fans of the series will immediately embrace."

== Manga ==
Three officially licensed manga were produced for Japan by Enterbrain Company, including two four-panel parody comics and an anthology comic, both released in 2000. An official novelization of the game's story, Breath of Fire IV: The Unfading Ones—The Arukai Dragon—was written by Yayoi Joumon and released in 2000. Additionally, an official manga adaptation by Hitoshi Ichimura under the title Utsurowazaru Mono: Breath Of Fire IV (うつろわざるもの―ブレス オブ ファイアIV) has been serialized since November 2007 in Comic Blade Avarus, with a compilation of the first five chapters from November 2007 to March 2008 published by Mag Garden in May 2008 in book format. The Comic Blade Avarus manga adaptation, which is a pure "graphic novelisation" of the game, is still being published in serial format as of the September 2008 issue and is officially being produced under supervision from Capcom.
