= Breath of Fire: Dragon Quarter =

2002 video game

- Japanese box art
- Developer: Capcom Production Studio 3
- Publisher: Capcom
- Director: Makoto Ikehara
- Producer: Hironobu Takeshita
- Artist: Tatsuya Yoshikawa
- Writer: Yukio Andoh
- Composer: Hitoshi Sakimoto
- Series: Breath of Fire
- Platform: PlayStation 2
- Release: JP: November 14, 2002; NA: February 18, 2003; EU: November 28, 2003
- Genre: Role-playing
- Mode: Single-player

Breath of Fire: Dragon Quarter (Note: Known in Japan as Breath of Fire V: Dragon Quarter (Japanese: ブレス オブ ファイアV ドラゴンクォーター, Hepburn: Buresu obu Faia Faibu Doragon Kwōtā)) is a 2002 role-playing game by Capcom for the PlayStation 2. It is the fifth entry in the Breath of Fire series.

== Gameplay ==
Breath of Fire: Dragon Quarter is a role-playing video game that deviates drastically from previous games in the series, and is the first using fully three-dimensional graphics for characters and environments. Players control their characters from a third-person perspective as they navigate a number of environments including dungeons and towns where they may interact with non-player characters. While previous Breath of Fire games took place in fantasy environments containing open areas, Dragon Quarter features a science fiction motif that sets the game in a series of bunkers 1000m below the surface in an industrialized, post-apocalyptic environment. Players must travel upward through a network of tunnels while battling enemies and collecting keys. A map system alerts players to nearby doors, treasures, and enemies.

Rather than experiencing the entire game in a single play-through, Dragon Quarter is designed to be played through multiple times to experience the whole story. Using the Scenario Overlay (SOL) System, specific plot points and game areas are only accessible if the player's D-Ratio number is high enough. Players' D-Ratio is initially 1/8192 and can only be raised by restarting the game and using the SOL: Restore function, which allows the player to begin a new game while carrying over all accumulated items, equipment, and skills previously acquired. Progress is saved to the PlayStation 2 memory card using limited save tokens found during gameplay. Players may suspend their game as many times as they wish by creating a temporary save at certain areas in the game, which is deleted as soon as it is loaded.

At a certain point in the game, the player can use dragon abilities and a D-Counter appears on screen. When the D-Counter reaches 100 percent, the game ends and the player is sent back to their last permanent save. The meter raises continually as the player uses the abilities and can only be lowered by restarting using SOL: Restore.

Battles use the Positive Encounter and Tactics System (PETS), described by Capcom as a "combined real-time and turn-based combat". A battle begins when a character encounters an on-screen enemy, and the player can employ a pre-emptive strike. Combat can be avoided by setting traps or leaving food. In combat each character takes action according to their "agility" statistic. The participant has free movement in the battle area during their turn. Characters are allocated Active Points (AP) at the start of their turn with the number decreasing with each step and attack they make. There are three levels of attack with higher levels costing more AP but doing more damage. Attacks may be strung together into combination attacks. New weapons provide new attacks and Attack Skills can be found scattered throughout the game. A battle is won when all enemies are defeated or have fled, with victories earning the player experience points.

== Plot ==
Humanity has fled the devastated surface to the underground where the upper classes inhabit higher levels with better air. Ryu is a low level citizen who rebels against the government to save the life of Nina, who cannot survive underground due to experimental surgery to convert her into an air purification machine. Ryu can transform into a dragon.

Ryu must ascend with Nina and the ever-watchful Lin from a kilometer below ground to the surface, traversing dark passageways and fending off encounters. On the lowest levels are those with low D-ratios; as one ascends the inhabitants' D-ratio increases. D-ratio determines social status. The highest D-ratio a human can achieve is 1/4 - this is the Dragon Quarter of the title, a one in four chance of linking with an available dragon.

There are two subplots; the first concerns the six mysterious rulers of the underground world, ubiquitous in their ability to acquire and act on information. These rulers reveal a legend that a boy with the power to become a dragon will return the world to the surface. The second subplot is a rivalry between Ryu and Bosch, an entitled, monomaniacal elitist. Bosch initially uses Ryu as his lackey to increase his rank, but inadvertently releases Ryu's ability to become a dragon. Seeing this power, Bosch undergoes dragon fusion and gains the ability to also become a dragon.

Ryu invades the upper levels. Three of the five regents which govern Ryu's world have fallen to his blade before he faces Elyon, aka "Origin", the leader of the Regeants and first host of the dragon Odjn. Elyon acknowledges none have come closer to reclaiming the surface world than Ryu. He summons two pieces of himself that he had banished to extend his life. After a fierce battle Elyon is defeated and Ryu notes that Elyon was "Odjn's first", alluding to Elyon's responsibility for humanity not reclaiming the sky hundreds of years ago. Ryu, Lin and Nina approach the hatch itself, where Bosch intercepts them, now containing his own true dragon, Chertyre, instead of a mere construct. Bosch is defeated and gives himself over to Chertyre to manifest himself in the world again. Ryu is forced to use his D-Breath attack to channel Odjn's power against Chertyre. This brings his D-Counter to 100%, something to be avoided during other points in the game. Ryu's D-Counter rises far above 100%, and he finally defeats Chertyre and opens the way to the surface. As he lays dying, Ryu tells Lin and Nina to go on ahead, that he'll catch up with them in a moment.

As Nina and Lin ascend the spiral staircase to the surface, Odjn appears, asking if Ryu has any regrets. Ryu says he has none, and that reaching the surface was his only goal. Odjn exults, telling Ryu that it was not Odjn's power which brought Ryu this far, but Ryu's own determination. As Lin and Nina grieve, Odjn restores Ryu's life.

== Development ==
Breath of Fire: Dragon Quarter was announced by Capcom at the 2002 Electronic Entertainment Expo in Los Angeles as the first game in the series to appear on the PlayStation 2. The project was headed by series veteran Makoto Ikehara, who was inspired to create the game's dystopian setting by the 1994 alternate history novel Gofungo no Sekai (五分後の世界, lit. The World Five Minutes From Now) by Ryū Murakami. The unique gameplay and high challenge were to differentiate it from previous entries in the series, which Ikehara felt were too easy compared to other role-playing titles. The level of difficulty increased as development progressed. Character design was handled by Tatsuya Yoshikawa, who had provided the artwork for all previous games in the series. He modelled Elyon on the antagonist of the previous game, Fou-Lu, because he wanted to use the character again. To give the dragons Odjn, Dover, and Chetyre a distinct identity, they spoke Russian during cutscenes and were named after the Russian numbers one (один, adeen), two (два, dva), and four (четыре, chyetirye). Unlike the Ryu protagonists of previous Breath of Fire games, the Ryu in this game is a normal human being, characterized by Yoshikawa as "an average person like you might find anywhere", with his only extraordinary features being his strong will and sense of justice. The game was released in Japan in November 2002 under its regional title, Breath of Fire V: Dragon Quarter, and was dedicated to the memory of Capcom employee Yasuhito Okada.

Some features were cut from the final version including an online mode and a fishing minigame similar to earlier titles. The dragon Odjn was originally conceived as a "cutesy" companion to Ryu and his team before becoming large and menacing, with his early design instead being used for Cupid's pet Oncotte. Story points considered too shocking were removed, including a locked room in the Biocorp Labs containing headless duplicate bodies of Nina, and Nina's surgeon's resemblance to Adolf Hitler. Ikehara wanted to include a cutscene showing how the surface world became uninhabitable, but was unable to do so.

A week before the game's release in Japan, Capcom USA announced it would release Dragon Quarter in North America in February 2003. This version appeared at the 2003 Capcom Gamers' Day under its official English title that excluded the numeral "V". The game was released in Europe in November 2003 featuring changes to the game's mechanics. The soft save function was removed so the only way to save the game was to create hard saves using save tokens. To compensate, there are roughly twice as many save tokens throughout the game.

On February 16, 2016, Breath of Fire V: Dragon Quarter was released on the Japanese PlayStation Store as a "PS2 Archives" digital title for PlayStation 3. The title was delisted from the store in early 2019.

=== Audio ===
The music was composed by series newcomer Hitoshi Sakimoto, who had contributed soundtracks for other role-playing titles such as Final Fantasy Tactics and the Ogre Battle series, along with sound producer Yasunori Mitsuda who oversaw the development of each track. A five-song promotional album called the Breath of Fire V Dragon Quarter Mini Image Soundtrack was given away to attendees of the 2002 Tokyo Game Show and sold on Capcom's online store. A full soundtrack on two discs was released in December 2002 by Capcom's music label Suleputer. Dragon Quarter features the vocal song "Castle・imitation" by J-pop performer Chihiro Onitsuka as the game's ending theme, which was included on her 2002 album "Sugar High". In 2006, the soundtrack was included on the 11-disc Breath of Fire Original Soundtrack Special Box, containing music from every game in the series.

== Reception ==
Reception

Aggregate scores
Aggregator	Score
GameRankings	78%
Metacritic	78%

Review scores
Publication	Score
1Up.com	B+
Edge	7 / 10
Electronic Gaming Monthly	7.7 / 10
Famitsu	9/10, 8/10, 8/10, 7/10
Game Informer	8 / 10
GamePro	4 / 5
GameSpot	8 / 10
IGN	8.2 / 10
Play	8 / 10
PlayStation: The Official Magazine	7 / 10

Breath of Fire: Dragon Quarter was the top-selling game in Japan during the week of its release in November 2002 at 80,059 copies. It went on to sell 140,073 copies by the end of that year, qualifying it for a re-release in July 2003 under Sony's "PlayStation the Best" label at a lower price. The game was given an 8.5 out of 10 average by Japanese Hyper PlayStation 2 magazine,

Many North American reviewers commented on the changes made between Dragon Quarter and earlier games in the Breath of Fire series, with Game Informer claiming that "If anything, Dragon Quarter will likely tear the Breath of Fire fan base apart...it's unlike anything you've experienced before" and IGN calling it "a tough pill to swallow for returning fans." IGN praised the title's "enormous" combat strategy, steam punk atmosphere, and soundtrack, calling the game's musical score "pure genius", but found its playtime of around ten hours to be low, calling it the "perfect RPG rental." GameSpot felt that, while Dragon Quarter's combat system was enjoyable at first, it became less tactical as the game progressed, and that it "devolves into the sorts of slugfests typical of RPGs." The website commended the "inspired" character designs and their "realistic emotions" accentuating the game's serious tone. Electronic Gaming Monthly stated of the new battle system "[we] don't think [we]'ve ever had as much fun with RPG battles before," but felt the pacing hindered the story. GamePro said "an RPG sequel that couldn't be more different if it tried", commending its "astonishing" combat, but felt the forced repetition of the Scenario Overlay system and having to play through several times to see all the content was its biggest downfall. TechTV similarly felt the game's restart mechanics will either "inspire you or drive you mad", but found the "unique combat" and "attractive visuals" to be positive.

European reviewers similarly commented on the deviation from role-playing game standards. Play magazine found most of the changes beneficial, stating "[we] wanted something different too, but what [we] got instead is marvelous." Edge found its innovations to be mixed, but overall good, saying "Such bastard generic cross-pollination will be of keen interest to those who have pigeonholed the console RPG as yesterday's bread, as Dragon Quarter variously succeeds in its misfit marriage." The title ultimately received mostly positive reviews, with a 78% average score from the aggregate review websites GameRankings and Metacritic. Dragon Quarter was nominated for "Best Original Music in a Game" during GameSpot's Best and Worst of 2003 awards, and in 2004, IGN ranked the game 6th on its list of the "Top 12 Hidden Gems for the PlayStation 2", which included games that sold less than 135,000 copies in North America, or less than half of one percent of the console's user base, stating that "For one of the most popular role-playing franchises in the entire 32-bit era, the lackluster performance of Breath of Fire: Dragon Quarter is nothing short of surprising."
