= Yoshino Aoki =

Japanese composer and lyricist (born 1971)

- 青木 佳乃
- Born: August 19, 1971 (age 55); Kanagawa Prefecture, Japan
- Occupations: Composer; lyricist
- Years active: 1995–present
- Employer: Capcom (1995–2007)
- Spouse: Tetsuya Shibata (m. 2014)
- Musical career
- Instruments: Piano, flute

Yoshino Aoki (青木 佳乃, Aoki Yoshino) (born August 19, 1971) is a Japanese video game music composer and lyricist. She began her career with video game company Capcom, and later co-founded the music studio Unique Note with another ex-Capcom composer, Tetsuya Shibata.

== Life and career ==
Yoshino Aoki was born in Kanagawa, Japan, and studied classical music as a child. She began playing piano at the age six, began learning the flute at age 13, and started using a synthesizer shortly thereafter. In high school, she sang classical music and played the keyboard in her own band. In college, she studied music education and classical singing.

After graduating from college, Aoki went to work for video game company Capcom, where she began her career by arranging Kinuyo Yamashita's score for the CD re-release of Capcom's Mega Man X3, along with three other members of Capcom's sound team. In 2007 she left Capcom to pursue a freelance career. She is currently in employment with sound studio Unique Note Co., Ltd., a studio founded by Tetsuya Shibata and herself. She later married Shibata in 2014. She acts as the company's vice president, as well as a composer, arranger, and lyricist.

Yoshino Aoki is also known for her vocal role in the song "Kaze yo, Tsutaete", often used as the theme song for the Mega Man character Roll.

== Works ==
Year	Title	Role(s)
1996	Mega Man X3 (PS1 & Sega Saturn versions)	Arrangements with Toshihiko Horiyama, Shusaku Uchiyama, and Makoto Tomozawa
1997	Mega Man Battle & Chase	Vocalist
1997	Breath of Fire III	Music with Akari Kaida, vocalist
1998	Super Gem Fighter Mini Mix (Console versions)	Music with Isao Abe
2000	Breath of Fire IV	Music with Taro Iwashiro, vocalist
2001	Mega Man Battle Network 2	Music
2002	Steel Battalion	Vocalist
2002	Mega Man Battle Network 3	Music
2005	Shadow of Rome	Music with Kota Suzuki
2005	Mega Man Battle Network 6	Music
2006	Mega Man Star Force	Music with Mitsuhiko Takano
2007	Mega Man Star Force 2	Music with Marika Suzuki
2008	Luminous Arc 2	Music with Akari Kaida, Shunsuke Tsuchiya, and Yoko Shimomura
2008	Shiki-Tei	Music
2008	Daletto World	Music
2008	Mega Man Star Force 3	Music with Akari Kaida
2008	Suikoden Tierkreis	Music with several others
2009	Half-Minute Hero	"Triumphant Return"
2009	Rakuen	Vocalist with Tetsuya Shibata
2009	Suisei	Vocalist with Tetsuya Shibata
2011	Earth Seeker	Music with Tetsuya Shibata
2011	Half-Minute Hero: The Second Coming	"Destiny", "Grand Ending"
2011	Otomedius Excellent	Arrangements with several others
2014	Merc Storia	Music with Tetsuya Shibata and Kenichi Tendo
2015	Final Fantasy Record Keeper	Arrangements with various others, vocalist
2016	UPPERS	Music with Unique Note
2016	Justice Monsters Five	Music with Unique Note
2016	Final Fantasy XV	Music with Yoko Shimomura, Tetsuya Shibata, and Yoshitaka Suzuki
2017	Final Fantasy XV: Episode Gladiolus	Music with Keiichi Okabe and Tetsuya Shibata
2017	Monster of the Deep: Final Fantasy XV	Music with Tetsuya Shibata
2018	Last Period	Music with several others
2018	Super Smash Bros. Ultimate	Arrangements
2022	Babylon's Fall	Recording manager
2022	Gungrave G.O.R.E	Music with Shoya Kitagawa and Ren Tsukagoshi
2023	Resident Evil 4	Music with several others
