= Breath of Fire III =

1997 video game

- Cover art of PlayStation Portable release
- Developer: Capcom
- Publishers: Capcom: EU: Infogrames (PS1); CHN: Ubi Soft (Windows)
- Director: Makoto Ikehara
- Producers: Yoshinori Takenaka; Hironobu Takeshita
- Programmer: Tatsuya Kitabayashi
- Artists: Tatsuya Yoshikawa; Tōru Yamashita
- Writer: Makoto Ikehara
- Composers: Yoshino Aoki; Akari Kaida
- Series: Breath of Fire
- Platforms: PlayStation; PlayStation Portable; Windows
- Release: PlayStation: JP: September 11, 1997; NA: May 18, 1998; EU: October 8, 1998; Windows: CHN: May 24, 2001; PlayStation Portable: JP: August 3, 2005; EU: February 3, 2006; PlayStation Network: NA: February 9, 2016
- Genre: Role-playing
- Mode: Single-player

Breath of Fire III (Note: In Japanese Buresu obu Faia III (ブレス オブ ファイアIII)) is a role-playing video game developed and published by Capcom originally for the PlayStation console as part of the Breath of Fire series. It was released in Japan on September 11, 1997, and in North America and Europe in 1998. It is the first game in the franchise to feature three-dimensional graphics and voice acting. On August 25, 2005, the game was ported and released for the PlayStation Portable handheld system in Japan, and was also released in Europe on February 3, 2006.

The story takes place in a fantasy world where humans live alongside anthropomorphic creatures, and centers on Ryu, the last of The Brood (a race of people who can transform into powerful dragons), as he searches the world to uncover the mystery of his people and reunite with his surrogate family. Ryu's journey takes him into adulthood where he is joined by a number of other characters who aid him in his quest. The game received mostly positive reviews upon release, though the jazz-inspired soundtrack by company composers Yoshino Aoki and Akari Kaida was widely derided as being both inappropriate to the atmosphere and unmemorable. Critics generally remarked that Breath of Fire III lacks innovation but is highly engaging due to the craftsmanship and attention to detail in both the story and gameplay. It would go on to sell more than 679,000 copies in Japan and the United States.

On January 27, 2016, Capcom announced that Breath of Fire III would be re-released as a download in the US in February through the PlayStation Network for the PlayStation Vita, PSTV, and other PSP hardware compatible devices.

== Gameplay ==
Breath of Fire III was the first game in the series to feature 3D environments.

Breath of Fire III is a traditional console role-playing game that requires the player to accomplish story-based objectives while battling enemy creatures in a number of fantasy environments. Presented from an overhead isometric viewpoint, the player may rotate the game's camera in any direction around the central character, as well as tilt it up or down to see over or under impeding objects. When traveling through the game's environment, each character can perform a unique special ability that allows the player to solve puzzles or destroy objects, as well as gain access to otherwise hidden areas. The game uses three-dimensional graphics for scenery, buildings, and other objects, while still retaining two-dimensional sprites for characters.

The game introduces a number of new features to the series, including the Master System, which allows any of the game's playable characters to apprentice under specific non-player characters known as masters, which allows them to learn new skills and influence their statistics. An additional feature, the Fairy Village, gives the player the ability to influence the growth of a small town of faeries, which in turn gives them access to special items or in-game features such as mini-games and a sound test. While journeying on the world map, players may set up camp, which can replenish a character's health by resting, as well as allowing them to speak directly to any member of their party. Other series mainstays such as fishing return with a new, expanded interface and point allocation system that keeps track of what fish a player has caught and their size.

Battles in Breath of Fire III occur randomly when a player travels through hostile areas or dungeons during the course of the story. Using a turn-based strategy approach, the game allows a player to input commands at the start of each combat round, which are then carried out in accordance with each character's "agility" rating. A player may choose to attack, defend, cast magic spells, use items, change equipment, or flee from battle entirely. Players can combine chrysms of various attributes in order to let Ryu transform into different dragon forms. While previous Breath of Fire titles allowed groups of four characters to participate in combat, Breath of Fire III restricts the party limit to only three, yet offers a new "formation" system that allows for characters to be arranged in certain patterns for tactical benefits. Battles are won when all enemies are defeated, yielding experience points that go towards gaining characters' levels, which in turn leads to higher statistics and new skills.

== Plot ==
=== Characters ===
Tatsuya Yoshikawa's character designs for Breath of Fire III

The main character in Breath of Fire III is Ryu. As a member of the ancient Brood race, Ryu is a human with the ability to transform into powerful dragons, an ability he does not fully understand, but pieces together as time goes on. He is accompanied on his quest by several other playable characters, including Nina, a winged princess from the Kingdom of Wyndia and powerful magician; Rei, member of the cat-like Woren tribe and skilled thief; Teepo, an orphaned rogue and longtime friend of Rei's with no memory of his past; Momo, daughter of a famous engineer and inventor; Garr (Garland in the Japanese version), an experienced warrior and member of a group known as the Guardians who serve the goddess Myria; and Peco (Pecoros in the Japanese version), an onion-like creature with limited speech and a connection with nature.

Balio and Sunder, brothers and horse-men, act as mercenaries to a powerful crime lord and frequent adversaries of Ryu. Their boss, Mikba, is the head of a criminal organization with the ability to transform into a demon. Deis (Note: Deis is known as "Bleu" in the original English translations of Breath of Fire and Breath of Fire II) returns as a powerful sorceress who knows the secrets of the past. Myria, an ancient Goddess of Destruction, serves as the antagonist once more, though her motives have changed, and she is instead set on preserving the lives of humanity by ordering the deaths of the dragons.

Ryu, Teepo and Rei run afoul of the giant woodsman Bunyan; Mygas, a traveling wizard who is camped outside of McNeil village; and the self-doubting master of non-lethal combat, Durandal, who provides the party with the skills to impress Hondara, the benevolent Urkan priest who despises violence. Fahl, the tipsy barkeep from Genmel and friend of Balio and Sunder will become one with them after those villains are defeated and if they have fought 30 battles without resting. A strange fishman named Giotto teaches skills once the party reaches a high-enough fishing level. Once Ryu and his team fix Rhapala's lighthouse situation and meet the fairies, the errant fairy Meryleep turns up at a secluded pond, asking for her flower jewel which was stolen by a crow. The party can also use Peco to communicate with Yggdrasil trees. Near the end of the game, the dragon spirit Ladon offers to communicate with Ryu in a similar fashion.

=== Story ===
Ryu, a preserved baby dragon unearthed by miners, inadvertently shifts form into a young blue-haired boy and is taken in by wandering thieves named Rei, member of the cat-like Woren clan and Teepo, an orphan with no memory of his past. They believe Ryu to be just an abandoned child.

The trio are hired by a hooded figure named Loki to steal all the money from the town's corrupt mayor. They break into the manor, pilfer the gold, and re-distribute his money among the villagers. The mayor hires two hitmen, the horse brothers Balio and Sunder, to exact revenge on the gang for their theft. Balio and Sunder burn down the trio's home, attack them, and leave them for dead. Ryu awakens in the care of a woodsman who fished him out of the river and found no trace of his friends. Ryu leaves Yraal Region. Ryu comes across Balio and Sunder in Mt. Myrneg. He is stabbed and reanimates into a dragon. The horse brothers take him to the Royal Family in Wyndia to sell him, but he transforms back to human. Balio, Sunder, and Ryu are locked up in the prison, where they meet Nina, child daughter of the King. Balio and Sunder trick Nina into releasing them and Ryu breaks out of his cell. Nina saves Ryu from Balio and Sunder, who are now on their trail.

Ryu and Nina come across a large tower and meet Momo, an inventor and engineer who is researching chrysm. They escape the tower by rocket when bounty hunters arrive looking for them. Momo leads Ryu and Nina to a chrysm research facility. The institute's chairman and colleague of Momo's late father, Dr. Palet, informs the party of a mutant creature causing trouble at the biological waste dump. After defeat, the mutant plant creature gives up its offspring, whom Nina names Peco, to be cared for in its absence. They hop onto a cart to be smuggled back to Wyndia, unaware that Palet sold them out to Balio and Sunder. They are recaptured by Balio and Sunder, transported back to Genmel, and signed up to fight in the arena. Garr, a seasoned warrior, beats Ryu in the arena, and demands Ryu as his prize, sidestepping his deal with the horse brothers. With Garr's help, the team defeats the horse brothers.

Garr agrees to help the group find Rei and Teepo, on the condition that Ryu accompany him to a sacred temple far to the east. They travel to Urkan Region, and arrive at the temple. Inside, Garr reveals the Brood, the race of dragons that once populated the world, was slaughtered by Garr and his fellow guardians at the behest of Myria, an ancient goddess who promised an age of peace in return. Ryu being the last living dragon, Garr attempts to slay him. Ryu beats him and escapes. Having been easily defeated by a child of the Brood, Garr has an epiphany: the Brood did not really fight back against him and the other guardians.

Several years later, reports of a rampaging dragon lead Garr to Ryu, now a young adult. Garr asks forgiveness for his actions against his people and entreats Ryu to help him discover the true motivation behind Myria's genocide of the Brood. Back in Yraal Region, the pair regroups with Nina, who led a regiment in arresting Mayor McNeil for his involvement with the attempt on Ryu's life and the destruction of their home. A weretiger has moved through the village, and Loki was mauled. They track the weretiger, revealed to be Rei. Rei has not seen Teepo since the incident.

The team reunites with Momo, who has been performing experiments at the plant institute with Peco. The party receives information about Myria's whereabouts from a deity named Deis. After traversing the ocean, the group proceeds to the last known village of the Brood, Dragnier. They learn of a battle with Myria millennia ago. The party crosses a desert, and find the ruined city of Caer Xhan, which contains an escalator leading to Myria's fortress.

The group fights its way into the facility's inner sanctum, where they meet Teepo. After surviving the attack by Balio and Sunder by drawing on his latent dragon powers, Teepo was contacted by the Goddess, who convinced him to live in peaceful seclusion in her fortress to spare the world from his destructive power. Unable to convince Ryu or his friends to do the same, Teepo morphs into his Dragon Lord form and fights them to the death. The group makes their way to Myria. She reveals that she exterminated the dragons centuries ago for the same reason she destroyed the world's advanced technology: to keep humanity from inadvertently destroying itself. She presents Ryu the same choice she gave Teepo: to live the rest of his life in peace within her station or be destroyed.

If the player complies with Myria, the game ends with Ryu in Eden. If the player challenges her, the spirit of the great tree Yggdrasil channels itself through Peco and tells Myria she is taking her power too far. Ryu and his friends overcome Myria and then flee the station as it crumbles. Garr reveals that his life must end with Myria's, turning to stone. Deis, now revealed to be Myria's sister, appears before Myria as the station falls apart, stating that they will henceforth leave the world in humanity's hands. Ryu, Nina, Momo, Rei, and Peco begin their long journey home.

== Development ==
Breath of Fire III was developed by members of Capcom's Development Studio 3, including director Makato Ikehara and producers Yoshinori Takenaka and Hironobu Takeshita. The game was the first in the series to feature three-dimensional environments, which were used in conjunction with hand-drawn character sprites designed by series artist Tatsuya Yoshikawa. Yoshikawa created multiple designs for many of the game's characters during production, with some in-game character sprites such as young Ryu and Teepo and adult Nina not matching their final promotional artwork. Before its release in Japan, Breath of Fire III was preceded by a promotional trailer that appeared on a demo disc of Resident Evil 2 that came bundled with the Japanese version of Resident Evil: Director's Cut. Capcom USA announced in August 1997 that the title would receive an English localization in North America, with the release date originally set for January 1998, which would eventually get pushed back to the following March. In Europe, the game was published through French publisher Infogrames (Instead of Capcom's main European partner Virgin Interactive) and was released in October 1998.

In June 2005, Capcom announced that it would be porting Breath of Fire III to the PlayStation Portable handheld system alongside a similar port of Mega Man Legends, with both to be released the following August. The port features a new title logo graphic, and was re-programmed to make use of the handheld's native 16:9 widescreen display. An expanded version of the title's fishing minigame is also included, which can be shared with another PlayStation Portable owner using the system's GameShare function, with the Japanese release including a full-color fishing guidebook as a bonus. An English version of the port was later made available exclusively in Europe in February 2006, which contained the same translation as the original PlayStation release.

On January 27, 2016, Capcom announced that Breath of Fire III would be re-released in February as a download through the PSN network for the PS Vita, PSTV, and other PSP hardware compatible devices. The release announcement applies only to the PlayStation Network's US store.

=== Audio ===
The music of Breath of Fire III was composed by Yoshino Aoki and Akari Kaida, two members of Capcom's internal sound team who also provided the vocals for the title's ending song "Pure Again". While previous games in the series used more traditional orchestral compositions, the soundtrack to Breath of Fire III features a jazz-inspired motif that focuses on instruments such as piano and xylophone. In September 1997, Capcom released the Breath of Fire III Original Soundtrack published by First Smile Entertainment, which features 31 select songs from the game across a single disc. A complete musical selection for the game would not be made available until March 2006, when the company released the Breath of Fire Original Soundtrack Special Box boxset containing music from the first five games in the series. Capcom had originally intended to use the theme song "Machi" (街, lit. City) by rock band Sophia for an opening animation that was to be included in the game but later discarded. The song would later appear in the game's television commercial in Japan, and would be released as a single in July 1997 by Toy's Factory.

In December 1997, Capcom's released the Breath of Fire III Drama Album, a radio drama which features re-enactments of scenes from the game performed by new and returning voice actors. Some characters, such as Momo, Garr, and Peco, are re-cast, now voiced by Kotono Mitsuishi, Akio Ōtsuka, and Yukiko Matsuura respectively, while Kappei Yamaguchi now performs as both child and adult Ryu, and Kyoko Hikami returns as the voice of Nina, who also sings the album's image song, "Harmonica". The album also includes new voiced roles such as Tomohiro Nishimura as Balio, Takehito Koyasu as Sunder, and Sayaka Narita and Omi Minami as Bambi and Bimbi, a team of reporters created especially for the album.

== Reception ==
Reception

Aggregate score
Aggregator	Score	
Aggregator	PS	PSP
GameRankings	74%	71%

Review scores
Publication	Score	
Publication	PS	PSP
Computer and Video Games	5/5	N/A
Electronic Gaming Monthly	8.125 / 10	N/A
Eurogamer	N/A	6 / 10
Famitsu	28 / 40	29 / 40
Game Informer	8.5 / 10; 8.75 / 10	N/A
GameSpot	6.9 / 10	N/A
IGN	7.5 / 10	N/A
Next Generation	4/5	N/A
Play	N/A	8.2 / 10
PlayStation: The Official Magazine	4.5 / 5	N/A
Dengeki PlayStation	65/100, 80/100, 80/100, 90/100	N/A

Breath of Fire III was met with a mostly positive response in Japan, with Famitsu Weekly awarding it 28 out of 40 possible points, while Dengeki PlayStation Magazine awarded it a 79% average. It was also met with a positive critical reception in Europe, with Computer and Video Games awarding it a full five-star rating, concluding that it is a "totally engrossing RPG" and "highly recommended."

Reviewing the Japanese release as an import, GamePro called it "a very enjoyable RPG in which sure craftsmanship is easily evident", giving praise to the colorful graphics and well-constructed battle system yet criticizing its soundtrack, remarking that it "veers widely from unmemorable electronica to hopeless schmaltz, and more often than not, it doesn't add to the atmosphere of the story."

Reception for Breath of Fire III in North America was positive, with the game holding a GameRankings score of 74% based on 12 reviews, all of them from North American publications. GameSpot declared that despite taking the series into 3D gaming, it was still a very "standard" role-playing game, stating that "even with its handful of new features, Breath of Fire III breaks little new ground." IGN similarly declared that "[f]or an RPG, Breath of Fire presents nothing incredibly new, story-wise, however the way in which everything in the game is arranged and executed shows an incredible amount of attention to detail and depth," additionally giving praise to the game's "memorable characters" and "immersive" gameplay. In their review of the North American release, GamePro disagreed about the story, describing it as complex and full of surprising twists and turns. Though they criticized the long load times, frequent battles, and especially the music, describing it as "a compilation of elevator and mall music", they concluded that the epic story line and innovations such as rotating the isometric view to find hidden items and playing the first half of the game as a child make it a worthwhile purchase for RPG fans. Next Generation also derided the "bizarre 'light jazz' soundtrack" and GameSpot said it "[ranges] from the expected epic style to what's best summed up as 'RPG lounge.'"

The four reviewers of Electronic Gaming Monthly described Breath of Fire III as highly traditional in both story and graphics, but also highly worthwhile due to the massive length, gripping story, and gameplay features like the ability to morph into different dragons. Next Generation likewise considered Breath of Fire III a gift for lovers of traditional, pre-Final Fantasy VII RPGs, particularly praising the English translation, well-developed characters, hand-drawn sprites, and detailed world. They stated that "Breath of Fire III is more than matched against the new breed of visually flashy RPGs on the market." Game Informer called it a "fairly straight-forward RPG" with colorful graphics and good characters, but found the long load times and high rate of enemy encounters to be a hindrance. PlayStation: The Official Magazine called the game a "must buy", calling attention to the game's "clever use of sound effects, detailed animation, and well-written, often humorous dialogue," adding that "to shrug this game off as 'more of the same' in the role-playing department would be a crime." The North American version would go on to sell 230,000 copies in its first year.

=== PlayStation Portable ===
The re-release of Breath of Fire III for the PlayStation Portable was received similarly to the first in Japan, with Famitsu giving the game a marginally better score of 29 out of 40.

European reviewers of the game were mixed. Some, like Eurogamer, were critical of the game's aged presentation and gameplay, claiming that "with nine years of intervening genre development since its inception, this is no wunderkind," citing the port's long load times and slow gameplay to be its downfall. Others, such as Play Magazine, found it to be "pretty generic, as all RPGs never fail to be, but does it all expertly, providing a great adventure that will soak up some hours." Official UK PlayStation 2 Magazine called the game "archaic yet charming" and recommended it only as a window into the genre's past. The PlayStation Portable version held a score on GameRankings of 71% at the time of the site's 2019 closure.

=== Sales ===
The original PlayStation release sold 425,497 copies in Japan during 1997, making it the 24th most-bought game that year, as well as qualifying it for Sony's "PlayStation the Best" distinction, which allowed it to be re-released in December 2000 at a reduced price. The game sold a further 230,800 copies in the United States, adding up to a total of at least 656,297 units sold in Japan and the United States.

The PSP version sold 23,448 units in Japan, enough to qualify for a re-release under Capcom's "CapKore" label at a reduced price in January 2007. This adds up to a total of at least 679,745 copies sold for both the PlayStation and PSP platforms in Japan and the United States.
