= Akari Kaida =

Japanese composer (born 1974)

Akari Kaida 海田 明里
- Born: January 10, 1974 (age 52); Hyōgo Prefecture, Japan
- Genre: Video game music
- Occupation: Composer
- Instrument: Piano
- Years active: 1994–present
- Label: Brave Wave

Akari Kaida (海田 明里, Kaida Akari; born January 10, 1974) is a Japanese video game music composer. She composed various soundtracks for Capcom games, including multiple in the Mega Man series. She has occasionally been credited as Akari Groves, taking the surname of her husband.

== Career ==
Kaida was a jazz piano major in college, spending her first year at the Osaka College of Music before joining Capcom in 1994. She became a freelance composer in 2005, but still continued to work on various Capcom projects, most recently becoming part of the Inti Creates sound team for Mega Man games.

== Notable works ==
Year	Title	Notes
1995	Night Warriors: Darkstalkers' Revenge	Music with Takayuki Iwai and Hideki Okugawa
1995	Cyberbots: Full Metal Madness	Music with Takayuki Iwai, Masato Kouda, and Naoaki Iwami
1995	Street Fighter Alpha	Console version; arrangements with Naoshi Mizuta and Naoaki Iwami
1996	Resident Evil	Data conversion
1997	Breath of Fire III	Music with Yoshino Aoki
1998	Mega Man & Bass	Music with Toshihiko Horiyama and Naoshi Mizuta
1999	Trick'N Snowboarder	Music with Masami Ueda
1999	Dino Crisis	"Abandoned Hope"
2001	Mega Man Battle Network	Music
2004	Onimusha 3: Demon Siege	Music with Masamichi Amano, Hideki Okugawa, and Kouta Suzuki
2004	Rockman EXE 4.5 Real Operation	Music with Toshihiko Horiyama
2004	Mega Man Battle Network 5	Music
2006	Ōkami	Music with Masami Ueda, Hiroshi Yamaguchi, and Rei Kondoh
2007	Luminous Arc	Music with Yasunori Mitsuda, Kazumi Mitome, and Shota Kageyama
2008	Luminous Arc 2	Music with Yoko Shimomura, Yoshino Aoki, and Shunsuke Tsuchiya
2008	Mega Man Star Force 3	Music with Yoshino Aoki
2009	Rockman EXE Operate Shooting Star	Music with Yoshino Aoki and Marika Suzuki
2010	Mega Man 10	"King of Blades (Blade Man Stage)"
2010	Tokimeki Memorial Girl's Side: 3rd Story	Music with various others
2010	LovePlus+	Music with various others
2011	Dream Club Zero	Arrangements ("Sunao ni Narenai" and "Toki no Kakera")
2012	New LovePlus	Music with various others
2014	Super Smash Bros. for Wii U	Arrangements (Note: "Escape", "Coliseum Series Medley")
2015	Chunithm	"Sabaku no Hunting Girl"
2015	Prince of Stride	Vocals ("Let the Wind Blow")
2019	Earth Defense Force: Iron Rain	Music with Masanori Ōtsuka, Yuichi Baba, and Shinya Chikamori
2019	Phantasy Star Online 2 Episode 6	Lyrics with various others
2020	Samurai Jack: Battle Through Time	Music with various others
2020	Earth Defense Force: World Brothers	Music with Yuichi Baba and Noi Iizuka
2021	DC Super Hero Girls: Teen Power	Music with various others
2021	Phantasy Star Online 2 New Genesis	Lyrics ("A World Beyond a Sky")
2023	Fashion Dreamer	Music with various others
2024	Tekken 8	Music with various others
2024	Earth Defense Force: World Brothers 2	Music with various others
2024	Phantasy Star Online 2 New Genesis The Festival of Light & The Dark Tyrant	Lyrics ("Driven by Hope" and "Unite")
2026	Tanuki: Pon's Summer	"A Tanuki Reminisces"
TBA	Penny Blood	Music with Yoshitaka Hirota, Nobuo Uematsu, and Kenji Ito
