= Breath of Fire II =

1994 video game

- Japanese Super Famicom cover artwork
- Developer: Capcom
- Publishers: WW: Capcom; EU: Laguna Video Games (SNES); EU: Ubi Soft (GBA)
- Producer: Tokuro Fujiwara
- Designer: Yoshinori Kawano
- Writer: Makoto Ikehara
- Composer: Yuko Takehara
- Series: Breath of Fire
- Platforms: SNES, Game Boy Advance
- Release: SNES: JP: December 2, 1994; NA: December 10, 1995; EU: April 25, 1996; Game Boy Advance: JP: December 21, 2001; NA: April 15, 2002; EU: June 28, 2002
- Genre: Role-playing
- Mode: Single-player

Breath of Fire II (Note: Released in Japan as Buresu obu Faia Tsū: Shimei no Ko (ブレス オブ ファイアII 使命の子; Breath of Fire II: The Destined Child)) is a role-playing video game developed and published by Capcom. First released in 1994, the game was licensed to Laguna for European release in 1996. It is the second entry in the Breath of Fire series. It was later ported to Game Boy Advance and re-released worldwide. The game was released on Wii's Virtual Console in North America on August 27, 2007. Nintendo of Europe's website mistakenly announced it for release on July 27, 2007, but it was in fact released two weeks later, on August 10, 2007. In 2013, it was released for the Wii U Virtual Console. In 2016, it was released for the New Nintendo 3DS Virtual Console. In 2019, it was released for the Nintendo Switch SNES games library.

Unlike later installments in the series, Breath of Fire II is a direct sequel to Breath of Fire. Set 500 years after the original game, the story centers on an orphan named Ryu Bateson, whose family vanished mysteriously long ago. After his friend is falsely accused of a crime, Ryu embarks on a journey to clear his name.

== Gameplay ==
Breath of Fire II is a traditional role-playing video game featuring two-dimensional character sprites and environments. Players view the game from a top-down perspective and move their characters in four directions across various environments including towns and dungeons while interacting with non-player characters and battling enemies to advance the story.

Navigation on a town's map

The game features a redesigned, text-based game menu as opposed to the icon-based design of the original Breath of Fire, as well as a new "Monster Meter" that indicates the probability of encountering enemy monsters in a given area. Players are required to venture into dangerous areas throughout the game world as dictated by the story, and randomly encounter enemies every few steps which must be defeated to advance. As the game progresses, new characters, each with their own specific abilities, join the player's party. Like the previous game, only four characters may be in a party at a given time, but now may not be freely switched outside of certain areas. Each character has a unique Personal Action that may be performed outside of combat that allows the player to access certain areas, destroy objects, avoid traps, or move about the game more easily. Breath of Fire II includes a new town-building feature that allows the player to populate their own village with special characters found throughout the game. Each character has their own distinct job, and may be invited to live in houses that the player adds by donating currency to one of three carpenters, each with their own building style. Six special inhabitants known as Shamans may also join the town, each with their own elemental alignment, and up to two at a time may be fused with party members to grant them new forms and abilities. While joined with a shaman, characters become stronger and may gain access to additional abilities while in battle.

Combat in Breath of Fire II is presented using a turn-based approach, where the player inputs commands for each character at the start of each round with the actions taking place by order of each character's and enemy's "agility" rating. A new Formation feature allows the player to organize their party into different positions, allowing certain members an increase in speed, defense, or attack power. Players win battles by defeating every enemy present, dealing damage by using normal attacks along with magic spells and items. When all enemies are defeated, they yield experience points that go toward leveling up characters, making them stronger and giving them access to new spells. Each character's health is represented by numerical hit points that indicate their remaining vitality, and are knocked out if the value reaches zero, with the battle ending if each member of a player's party is knocked out. Progress is recorded using the game cartridge's internal battery back-up memory, which can be accessed at dragon statues throughout gameplay.

== Plot ==
=== Characters ===
The characters of Breath of Fire II were designed by Capcom artist Tatsuya Yoshikawa, who also provided artwork for the cast of the previous game. Breath of Fire II features nine playable characters who join the player's party at set points throughout the story, each with their own selection of attacks, magic spells, and personal actions which can be used to pass certain obstacles and solve puzzles.

The main characters of Breath of Fire II. From left to right, back row to front row: Rand, Sten, Jean, Katt, Ryu, Nina, Bow, and Spar. Not shown: Bleu.

The main protagonist is a 16-year-old boy named Ryu Bateson, who shares his name with the main character from the original Breath of Fire, who mysteriously finds himself alone in the world one day after his father and sister disappear and all townspeople in his village forget who he is. As a member of the elusive Dragon Clan, Ryu possess the ability to transform into powerful draconic beings with destructive abilities, and makes his way as a "Ranger", a sword-for-hire. He is joined by his friend and fellow Ranger, Bow ("Boche Doggy" in the Japanese version), a thief and member of the Grassrunner clan of dog-people who uses a crossbow and healing spells. Throughout the game, players recruit additional characters at different points in the story, including Katt ("Rinpu Chuan" in the Japanese version), a member of the Woren clan of cat-people who fights at a coliseum; Rand Marks, muscular pangolin-person who fights with his bare hands; Nina Windia, descendant of the original Nina from Breath of Fire and princess of a clan of winged humans who was exiled due to her black wings, a bad omen in her country; Sten Legacy, a former soldier from a kingdom of monkey-people who makes his way as a trickster and performer; Ekkal Hoppa de Pe Jean, or simply Jean ("Tapeta" in the Japanese version), a love-struck prince of a race of frog-people who struggles to regain his kingdom after his throne is usurped; and Spar ("Aspara Gus" in the Japanese version), an emotionless plant girl who can commune with nature and is held captive by a traveling sideshow. An optional character in the form of the immortal sorceress Bleu ("Deis" in the Japanese version) from the original Breath of Fire may also be recruited.

=== Story ===
Breath of Fire II is set in a fantasy world 500 years after the events of the original game. The story opens on Ryu, age 6, living in the village of Gate with his sister Yua and father Ganer, a priest for the Church of St. Eva. Years earlier, Ryu's mother disappeared when demons erupted from a hole in a mountain on the outskirts of town, which was eventually blocked by a large dragon. One day, after visiting the dragon near the mountainside, Ryu returns to find his family missing and that no one in the village remembers who he is. Believing him to be an orphan, the townsfolk send him to live at the church with Father Hulk, who has seemingly been acting pastor for years. There, Ryu meets Bow, a fellow orphan, and runs away with him during a storm. The two seek shelter in a cave, where they encounter the demon Barubary, who claims that Ryu is the "Destined Child", knocks them unconscious, and disappears.

Ten years later, Ryu and Bow live together in HomeTown. As members of a Rangers guild, they are tasked with finding the lost pet of Mina, princess of the Kingdom of Windia. The two reluctantly complete the task and upon their return, Bow is charged with stealing from Trout, a local rich man. Bow claims he was framed by a mysterious "winged thief". Both escape the town the following night, and Bow remains in hiding while Ryu leaves to find the real thief and clear his friend's name. To gather information, Ryu travels to Coursair, a town with a large coliseum, and becomes a challenger in the arena against Katt, the coliseum's most popular fighter. Ryu gains Katt's trust by foiling the coliseum manager's plot to poison her and stage the fight, and then allies with her and Rand, an employee at the Coliseum, to defeat the manager, who has been possessed by a demon. While Rand stays behind to help construct Bow's hideout, Ryu and Katt arrive at HomeTown to investigate. There, they meet Nina, a student of magic and Mina's older sister. When Mina is kidnapped by a gang in an effort to blackmail Nina, she joins Ryu and Katt to defeat the gang's leader, who is also a demon in disguise. The party returns Mina to Windia, but find themselves expelled from the castle due to the superstition surrounding Nina's black wings. They are joined by Sten, a trickster who fails to swindle them and pledges himself to their cause. In the port town of Capitan, the party encounters Ray, a wandering priest of St. Eva, and assist him in rescuing a number of villagers from Capitan's dry well. Afterwards, Bow's hideaway is rebuilt into TownShip, and Ryu meets a Shaman, who taps into his latent ability to transform into a dragon, revealing him to be a part of the Dragon Clan thought missing for hundreds of years.

Upon traveling to a new continent, the group meets Jean, a frog-prince whose castle of SimaFort has been usurped by an impostor, whom the party is able to expose as a demon and defeat. The party retrieves the real thief, a bat-winged girl named Patty, from SimaFort's dungeon and turn her over to Trout. Exonerated, Bow rejoins the party, but expresses suspicion over Trout. He and Ryu break into Trout's house at night and find Patty imprisoned in a secret dungeon, and defeat Trout, also possessed by a demon. Suspecting the demon outbreak to be part of a larger problem, the party searches the world for Spar, a Grassman able to communicate with plants. Upon rescuing Spar from the clutches of a traveling sideshow, the party consults with the Great Wise Tree Gandaroof and discover that he is losing his memory. He requests that the party acquire the Therapy Pillow from the city of Tunlan so that they can enter his mind to restore it. To communicate with the people of Tunlan, the party first retrieves the Famous Flute from Sten's hometown of HighFort, where Sten is forced to confront his past as a former soldier and help rescue the kingdom from Shupkay, another demon in disguise. After saving Tunlan's princess from demonic possession, the party uses the Therapy Pillow to visit Gandaroof's mind, which is being destroyed by the demon Aruhameru. Aruhameru claims that Gandaroof possesses knowledge that threatens his "God", and reveals that he destroyed the people of Gate's memory of Ryu.

Once the party vanquishes Aruhameru, they learn that the demon outbreak is linked to Gate and the Church of St. Eva. When Rand's mother Daisy is abducted by St. Eva's soldiers, Nina decides to return to Windia and obtain the "mark of the wing", an old relic that will allow her to transform into the Great Bird and fly the group to St. Eva's Grand Church. After reuniting with her parents and consorting with the spirit of her great-great-great-great grandmother, the original Nina from Breath of Fire, Nina obtains the mark and prepares to undergo a ceremony that will transform her into the Great Bird permanently. However, Mina steals the mark and takes her sister's place, sacrificing her humanity. Traveling on Mina, the party makes their way to Evrai, the home of St. Eva. They find themselves trapped within the city, but manage to escape with the help of Claris, a young woman allied with a group of rebels seeking to destroy St. Eva.

Seeking out the rebels, the party meets their leader Tiga, and reunite with Patty, now the rebels' benefactor. Together, the rebels and the party discover that St. Eva is a front for a demon who uses the prayers of worshippers to empower itself, and Tiga formulates a plan to infiltrate the Grand Church. The plan succeeds, and the party learns that Habaruku, St. Eva's high priest, has captured Claris. Tiga attempts to rescue her, only for both him and Claris to be killed. The party pursues Habaruku, but Ray blocks their path and attacks them in dragon form, revealing himself as a member of the Dragon Clan. The battle awakens a powerful new dragon form in Ryu, which he uses to vanquish Ray. The party then rescues Daisy, who sacrifices herself to save Rand from a trap so that her son can continue fighting. In the catacombs of the church, the party finds Ryu's father Ganer attached to an energy-draining machine, having been kidnapped by Aruhameru ten years ago. Ryu and his friends either kill or rescue him, demolishing the church in doing so, and make their way back to Gate to stop the demons' plot once and for all. In Gate, the party watches as Father Hulk and the townsfolk try to destroy the dragon with a bomb, believing it to be responsible for the death of Gate's forest. The bomb weakens the dragon, allowing demons to escape from the mountain. Remorseful, Hulk asks the party to bring Patty, who has knowledge of the dragon. Upon Patty's arrival, Father Hulk captures her and reveals himself to be Habaruku in disguise, declaring his plan to sacrifice Patty, a member of the Dragon clan (and Ryu's sister Yua), to open the gate and release his God. With help from the dragon, the party defeats Habaruku.

The dragon thanks the party and reveals herself to be Ryu's mother Valerie, a member of the Dragon Clan that traveled from their underground hiding place and married Ryu's father, later assuming the form of a dragon to save her family from the invading demons. Valerie gives the party the choice of allowing her to resume her duty of guarding the gate, or traveling to defeat the demons for good; she sacrifices herself to open the gate if they agree. The party travels deep underground to the demon stronghold, where they meet the last remaining members of the Dragon Clan. Ryu gains the ultimate dragon power of Anfini and battles Barubary, the demon from his past. Once Barubary is defeated, the party confronts his master, Deathevn, St. Eva's God and a remnant of Myria, the main antagonist of the previous game. Using Anfini, Ryu defeats Deathevn, and returns home with his friends, although he realizes that Deathevn has not truly been defeated and will someday return. Two possible endings occur based on the player's actions — either Ryu sacrifices himself like his mother by transforming into a dragon to prevent further demon encroachment, or, if the player saved Ganer and enabled TownShip to fly, Ganer pilots the town onto the mountain, sealing it for good.

A third ending also exists: If the player chooses not to enter the cave and confront Deathevn when prompted by Valerie, a non-standard game over will be triggered in which the demons ultimately break through the weakened seal and conquer the world.

== Development ==
Breath of Fire II was developed by many of the same Capcom employees who worked on the previous game, including producer Tokuro Fujiwara and lead designer Yoshinori Kawano. While the character designs for the original Breath of Fire were conceived by company head of development Keiji Inafune, the cast of Breath of Fire II was created entirely by artist Tatsuya Yoshikawa, who had previously only provided promotional art for the game's predecessor. Unlike the original Breath of Fire, which was licensed to Square Soft for its North American release, the English version of Breath of Fire II was localized and published entirely by Capcom USA. The game was released in North America one year after the Japanese version in December 1995, and would later become the first Breath of Fire title to become available in Europe in April 1996.

Three days before the release of the original Breath of Fire on Nintendo's Game Boy Advance in July 2001, Capcom announced that they would similarly port Breath of Fire II to the handheld, with an initial release date some time in 2002. Like the re-release of its predecessor, the handheld version features re-drawn character portraits in menu screens, new still images used in cutscenes throughout the game, and a re-designed battle interface similar to Breath of Fire IV. New features include a dash button that allows players to move through the game faster, as well as an item-sharing system where two players may link together using the Game Boy Advance link cable to exchange items between game cartridges. To celebrate the game's release in December 2001, Capcom of Japan held an art contest for fans to submit artwork featuring characters from the first two Breath of Fire games, with the winner chosen by the Game Boy Advance version's staff. In January 2002, Capcom USA announced that an English version of Breath of Fire II would be heading to North America the following April. A European version would also be released in July 2002, published by Ubisoft.

=== Audio ===
While the background music for the original Breath of Fire was composed by four members of Capcom's sound team Alph Lyla, the score for Breath of Fire II was written entirely by series newcomer Yuko Takehara. In January 1995, the Breath of Fire II: Shimei no Ko Original Soundtrack was released in Japan by Sony Records, and featured 28 selected themes from the game on a single disc. A complete musical selection from the title would not be made commercially available until 2006, with the release of the Breath of Fire Original Soundtrack Special Box, which contained all music from the first five games of the series. In order to promote the game, Capcom hired J-pop singer Mio Watanabe to record a theme song that played during the game's television commercial in Japan called "Owaranai Ai" (終わらない愛, lit. Unending Love), which was released as a single in December 1994 by Alfa Records.

== Reception ==
Reception

Aggregate scores
Aggregator	Score		
Aggregator	GBA	SNES	Wii
GameRankings	75%	76%	N/A
Metacritic	81%	N/A	N/A

Review scores
Publication	Score		
Publication	GBA	SNES	Wii
Electronic Gaming Monthly	7.5/10	7.5/10	N/A
Eurogamer	N/A	N/A	8/10
Famitsu	8/10, 7/10, 7/10, 7/10	7/10, 6/10, 7/10, 8/10	N/A
GamePro	5/5	4.5/5 (all four categories)	N/A
GameSpot	7.7/10	N/A	6.5/10
GameSpy	N/A	9/10	N/A
IGN	8.3/10	8/10	8/10
Next Generation	N/A	3/5	N/A
Nintendo Life	N/A	8/10	6/10
Nintendo Power	3.1/5	N/A	N/A
Play	8/10	N/A	N/A

Breath of Fire II was released on December 2, 1994 for the Super Famicom, the same week as Sony's PlayStation console in Japan, and debuted on Japanese software charts as the seventh highest-selling game of its first week with 89,700 copies. It was given an 8 out of 10 in two separate Reader Cross Reviews printed by Famicom Tsūshin, and it would go on to sell a total of 350,000 copies in the region by the end of 1995. The game became popular enough to be re-released in the region for the Nintendo Power flash RAM peripheral in September 1997 at a reduced price.

Reviews in North America were mixed to positive. The four reviewers of Electronic Gaming Monthly generally found the game worth getting for its high quality sound and lengthy quest. Though Mark Lefebvre felt the graphics were below average and that the game overall "could have been a little better", the other three reviewers were more enthusiastic, praising the graphics and the shaman mechanic. GamePro's Major Mike was also impressed with the sheer length of the RPG. While remarking that there are very few cinematic scenes compared to the first Breath of Fire, he was pleased with the complexity of both the main story and most of the side quests. He also complimented the graphics and the change to different musical themes halfway through the game, and summarized, "This long, absorbing game offers plenty of story turns, intense battles, and intriguing characters." A reviewer for Next Generation said that the game "is larger and more involved than its predecessor, but unfortunately also much less interesting. While some parts are very clever (you are able to build your home town, populating it with stray homeless folks you run across), it suffers from too little direction, a purely mechanical storyline, and the clunkiest dialogue since Night Trap."

Similar to the original Super Nintendo Entertainment System release, the Game Boy Advance version met with mostly positive reception from critics, with the Japanese version receiving a 29 out of 40 score from Weekly Famitsu magazine. GameSpot compared the game to the previous version, calling it a "faithful translation of the SNES game" and praised the title's new save feature allowing players to record their progress at any time, but found that its music "leans toward the bland side of things" and "lack[s] personality". IGN found the game to be a step up from the first game's Game Boy Advance port, stating that "The storyline and characters make Breath of Fire II a much better game than the first adventure in the series...even though the game hasn't changed a whole lot." The website additionally felt that the game's lack of spaces in text fields and shoddy translation hurt the overall presentation, and the graphics were not up to par with games designed initially for the handheld such as Camelot's Golden Sun. GamePro awarded the Game Boy version a perfect score as well as an Editor's Choice Award, stating that the only flaw was the game's low difficulty, declaring that "In the realm of today's high-powered next-gen role-players, BOFII is an excellent time-killer". The game would later be nominated for "Best Port of a 16-bit Classic" and "Best Role-Playing Game on Game Boy Advance" in GameSpot's Best and Worst of 2002 Awards. The Game Boy Advance version holds a 75% review average on GameRankings, as well as an 81% average on Metacritic.

Breath of Fire II's Virtual Console release in 2007 met with mixed response. GameSpot called attention to the title's "pleasing visual presentation" and breadth of content, but found the game's localization to be "terrible" along with unpolished gameplay mechanics that made it appear to be a "hasty, careless effort". The game's pacing was also said to be poor, with too many "mundane tasks" laden throughout the story, recommending it to players who could look past its "rough edges". IGN called the game's translation "average at best" with the lack of adequate spacing in text fields still present, yet ultimately calling it a "solid, enjoyable RPG experience...though not a role-playing masterpiece on the level of Final Fantasy VI or Chrono Trigger". Eurogamer called attention to the game's high rate of random battles, but nonetheless called the game "a beautifully crafted and impeccably produced adventure".

In 2006, Nintendo Power ranked the game 171st in its list of the top 200 games released across all Nintendo consoles, ten places behind the original Breath of Fire. In 2018, Complex listed the game 75th on their "The Best Super Nintendo Games of All Time" writing: "Breath of Fire II isn't too different from the original, but different enough to not be a direct clone. It's a fun, turn-based RPG. But it's not as good as the first one." IGN rated the game 53rd in its Top 100 SNES Games. In 2023, Time Extension included the game on their "Best JRPGs of All Time" list.
