= Yoko Shimomura =

Japanese composer (born 1967)

- 下村 陽子
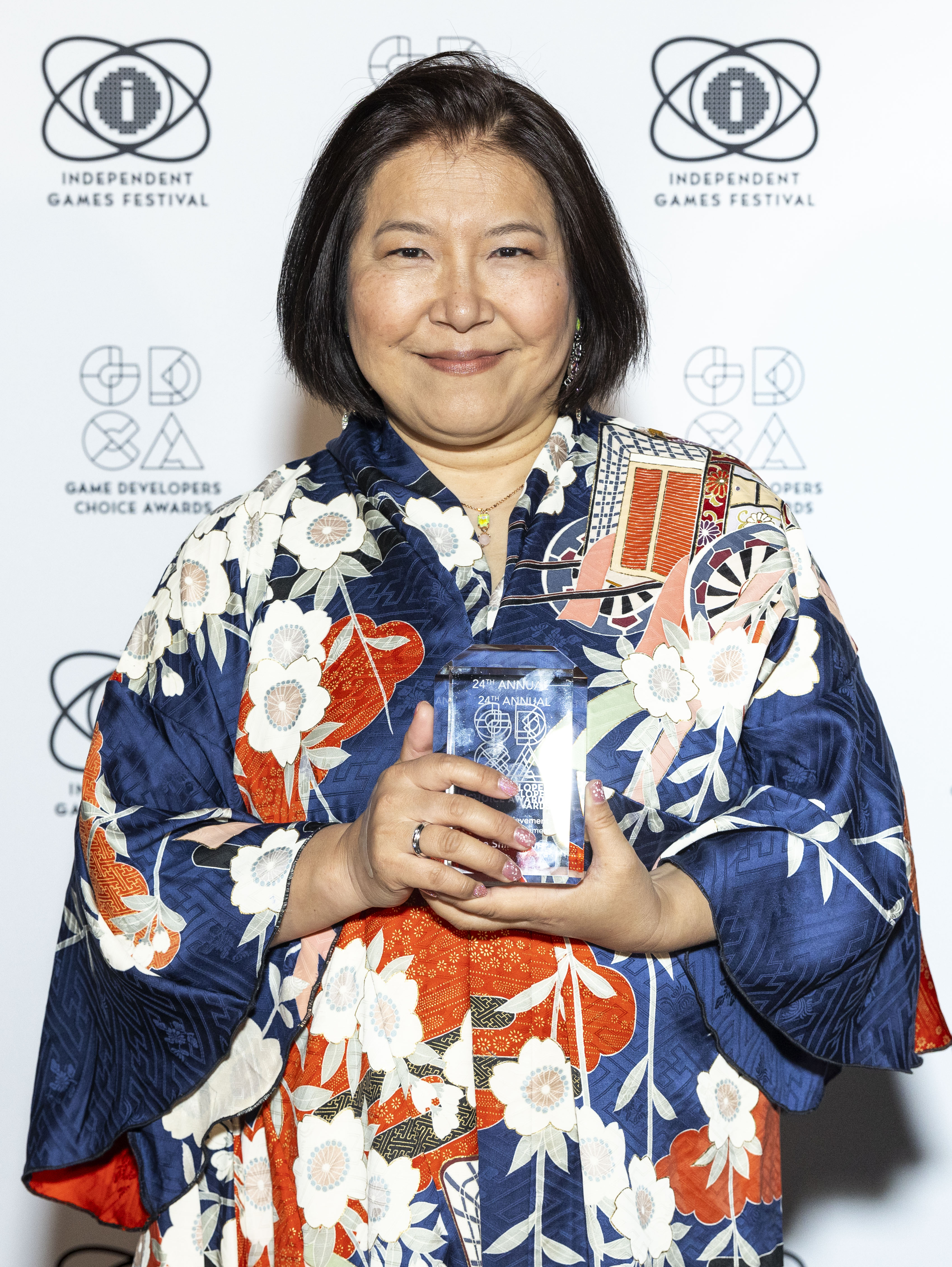
- Shimomura at the 2024 Game Developers Choice Awards
- Born: October 19, 1967 (age 59); Hyōgo Prefecture, Japan
- Education: Osaka College of Music
- Occupation: Composer
- Years active: 1988–present
- Employers: Capcom (1988–1993); Square (1993–2002)
- Awards: BAFTA Fellowship (2025)
- Musical career
- Genres: Video game; electronic; symphonic
- Instrument: Piano
- Label: Brave Wave Productions
- Website: Midiplex.com

Yoko Shimomura (Japanese: 下村 陽子, Hepburn: Shimomura Yōko; born October 19, 1967) is a Japanese composer and pianist known for her work in video games. She graduated from the Osaka College of Music in 1988 and began working at the video game studio Capcom the same year. Shimomura wrote music for several games there, including Final Fight, Street Fighter II, and The King of Dragons. She left Capcom and joined Square (now Square Enix) in 1993, with her first project there being Live A Live. There she would compose the music for games such as Super Mario RPG, Legend of Mana, and Parasite Eve. Shimomura received the BAFTA Fellowship award in 2025.

Shimomura would later become better known for writing the music for the Kingdom Hearts series. She left Square to become a freelancer in 2002, continuing to work with them on later games such as The 3rd Birthday and Final Fantasy XV. Other well-known games she worked on include the Mario & Luigi series, Radiant Historia, and Xenoblade Chronicles. Her works have been performed in multiple video game music concerts, with her music also published as arranged albums and piano scores. Shimomura is a member of the music label Brave Wave Productions.

== Early life ==
Shimomura was born on October 19, 1967, in Hyōgo Prefecture, Japan. She developed an interest for music at a young age, and started taking piano lessons "at the age of four or five". She began composing her own music by playing the piano randomly and pretending to compose, eventually coming up with her own pieces, the first of which she says she still remembers how to play. Shimomura attended Osaka College of Music, and graduated as a piano major in 1988.

Upon graduation, Shimomura intended to become a piano instructor and was extended a job offer to become a piano teacher at a music store, but due to her interest in video games she decided to send some samples of her work to various video game companies that were recruiting at the university. Capcom invited her in for an audition and interview, and she was offered a job there. Her family and instructors were dismayed with her change in focus, as video game music was not well respected, and "they had paid [her] tuition for an expensive music school and couldn't understand why [she] would accept such a job", but Shimomura accepted the job at Capcom anyway.

== Career ==
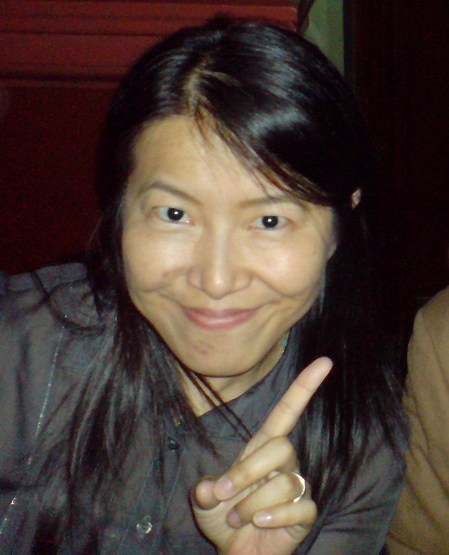
Shimomura in 2007

While working for Capcom, Shimomura contributed to the soundtracks of over 16 games, including the successful Street Fighter II, for which she composed all but three pieces. (Note: Versus Screen, Here Comes a New Challenger, and Sagat's Theme were written by Isao Abe) The first soundtrack she worked on at the company was for Samurai Sword in 1988. Final Fight, in 1989, was her first work to receive a separate soundtrack album release, on an album of music from several Capcom games. The first soundtrack album to exclusively feature her work came a year later for the soundtrack to Street Fighter II. While she began her tenure at Capcom working on games for video game consoles, by 1990 she had moved to the arcade game division. She was a member of the company's in-house band Alph Lyla, which played various Capcom game music, including pieces written by Shimomura. She performed live with the group on a few occasions, including playing piano during Alph Lyla's appearance at the 1992 Game Music Festival.

In 1993, Shimomura left Capcom to join another game company, Square. She stated that this was because she was interested in writing "classical-style" music for fantasy role-playing games. While working for Capcom, she was in the arcade department and was unable to transfer to the console department to focus her work on their role-playing video game series Breath of Fire, although she did contribute one track to the first game in the series. Her first project at Square was the score for the role-playing video game Live A Live in 1994. While she was working on the score to Super Mario RPG the following year, she was asked to join Noriko Matsueda on the music to the futuristic role-playing game Front Mission. Although she stated she was overworked doing both scores and it was not the genre that she was interested in, she found herself unable to refuse after her attempted refusal happened in the presence of the president of Square, Tetsuo Mizuno. These games were followed by Tobal No. 1, the last score she worked on with another composer for a decade.

Over the next few years, she composed the soundtrack to several games, including Parasite Eve and Legend of Mana. Of all her compositions, Shimomura considers the soundtrack to Legend of Mana the one that best expresses herself and the soundtrack remains Shimomura's personal favourite. Parasite Eve on the PlayStation had the first soundtrack by Shimomura that included a vocal song, as it was the first game she had written for running on a console system that had the sound capability for one. In 2002 she wrote the score for Kingdom Hearts, which she has said is the most "special" soundtrack to her, as well as a turning point in her career; she named the soundtracks to Street Fighter II and Super Mario RPG as the other two significant points in her life as a composer.

Kingdom Hearts was highly successful, shipping more than four million copies worldwide; Shimomura's music was frequently cited as one of the highlights of the game, and the title track has been ranked as the fourth-best role-playing game title track of all time. The soundtrack has received two albums of piano arrangements. Kingdom Hearts was the last soundtrack that she worked on as an employee at Square. After the release of Kingdom Hearts in 2002, Shimomura left Square for maternity leave, and began work as a freelancer in 2003. She has built on the work she did while at Square, continuing to compose music for all eleven Kingdom Hearts games, and branching out to Nintendo's Mario & Luigi series. She has also worked on many other projects, such as Heroes of Mana and various arranged albums. In February 2014, Shimomura played piano at a retrospective 25th anniversary concert at Tokyo FM Hall. She performed songs from games such as Kingdom Hearts, Live a Live, and Street Fighter II. During the Beware the Forest's Mushrooms performance from Super Mario RPG, Shimomura was joined onstage by fellow composer Yasunori Mitsuda, who played the Irish bouzouki. She also composed and produced the majority of the score for Final Fantasy XV, which she began writing for in 2006, a decade before the game was released. She is also a member of the music label Brave Wave Productions.

== Works ==
=== Video games ===
==== Composition ====
Video game compositions
Year	Title	Notes	Ref.
1988	Samurai Sword		
1989	Final Fight	"Round 5: Bay Area 2 & 3"	
1990	Code Name: Viper	All tracks except Stage 1 by Junko Tamiya (uncredited)	
1990	Gargoyle's Quest	With Harumi Fujita (uncredited)	
1990	Adventures in the Magic Kingdom		
1990	Mizushima Shinji no Daikoushien		
1990	Nemo		
1990	Mahjong School: The Super O Version	With Masaki Izutani (uncredited)	
1991	Street Fighter II	With Isao Abe	
1991	The King of Dragons		
1991	Block Block	With Masaki Izutani	
1992	Varth: Operation Thunderstorm	"Bonus Stage"	
1993	Breath of Fire	"Trade City"	
1993	The Punisher	With Isao Abe	
1994	Live A Live		
1995	Front Mission	With Noriko Matsueda	
1996	Super Mario RPG		
1996	Tobal No. 1	With several others	
1998	Parasite Eve		
1999	Legend of Mana		
2000	Hataraku Chocobo		
2002	Kingdom Hearts		
2003	Mario & Luigi: Superstar Saga		
2004	Kingdom Hearts: Chain of Memories		
2005	Pop'n Music 13 Carnival	"Majestic Fire"	
2005	Mario & Luigi: Partners in Time		
2005	Kingdom Hearts II		
2006	Monster Kingdom: Jewel Summoner	With several others	
2007	Heroes of Mana		
2007	Kingdom Hearts Re:Chain of Memories		
2008	Luminous Arc 2	With Akari Kaida, Yoshino Aoki, and Shunsuke Nakamura	
2009	Mario & Luigi: Bowser's Inside Story		
2009	Kingdom Hearts 358/2 Days		
2009	Pop'n Music 17 The Movie	"Twin Hero - Oath to Tomorrow"	
2010	Kingdom Hearts Birth by Sleep	With Tsuyoshi Sekito and Takeharu Ishimoto	
2010	Kingdom Hearts coded		
2010	Xenoblade Chronicles	With Manami Kiyota and ACE+ (Note: Tomori Kudo, Hiroyo "CHiCO" Yamanaka, Kenji Hiramatsu)	
2010	Last Ranker		
2010	Kingdom Hearts Re:coded		
2010	Radiant Historia		
2010	The 3rd Birthday	With Tsuyoshi Sekito and Mitsuto Suzuki	
2011	Half-Minute Hero: The Second Coming	"Battle of the God 9"	
2012	Kingdom Hearts 3D: Dream Drop Distance	With Tsuyoshi Sekito and Takeharu Ishimoto	
2012	Demons' Score	"Azazel del cielo ardiente"	
2013	Mario & Luigi: Dream Team		
2013	Kingdom Hearts χ		
2013	Exstetra	"Main Theme"	
2014	Rise of Mana	"Where the Heart Beats Free"	
2014	Terra Battle	Two tracks	
2014	V.D. -Vanishment Day-		
2015	Chronos Ring	With Kenji Ito and Evan Call	
2015	Chunithm: Seelisch Tact	"Tango Rouge"	
2015	Kakuriyo no Mon	"Ihou no Shugosha"	
2015	Mario & Luigi: Paper Jam		
2016	The Alchemist Code	With Shinya Tanaka and Shigeki Hayashi	
2016	The Black Knight and the White Demon King	With Shota Kageyama	
2016	Final Fantasy XV	With Tetsuya Shibata, Yoshino Aoki, and Yoshitaka Suzuki	
2017	Kingdom Hearts 0.2: Birth by Sleep – A Fragmentary Passage		
2017	Magicians Dead Next Blazing	With Masato Kouda and Makoto Iida	
2017	Egglia: Legend of the Red Cap	With Yoshitaka Hirota	
2017	Radiant Historia: Perfect Chronology		
2017	Mario & Luigi: Superstar Saga + Bowser's Minions		
2018	Mario & Luigi: Bowser's Inside Story + Bowser Jr.'s Journey		
2019	Kingdom Hearts III	With Tsuyoshi Sekito and Takeharu Ishimoto	
2019	Rakugaki Kingdom	"Yume to Gensou no Enbukyoku"	
2019	Renshin Astral	Paris battle themes	
2020	Streets of Rage 4	"Shiva"	
2021	Gran Saga		
2021	Xuan-Yuan Sword VII	"Mohism"	
2022	Sin Chronicle	"La Giustizia"	
2022	Mario + Rabbids Sparks of Hope	With Grant Kirkhope and Gareth Coker	
2024	Reynatis		
2025	Pipistrello and the Cursed Yoyo	"Pipistrello Manor"	
2025	Street Fighter 6	"Edge of Triumph"	
2025	Lost Soul Aside	"A New Home", "Luminous", "Walk With Me", "Lost Soul (Violin)"	
2026	Vampire Crawlers	Main theme "Il Cuor non si Spaura"	
2027	Kingdom Hearts IV		

==== Arrangements ====
Video game arrangements
Year	Title	Notes	Ref.
1989	F-1 Dream	Original music by Manami Matsumae	
1991	Buster Bros.	Original music by Tamayo Kawamoto	
2008	Super Smash Bros. Brawl	"Tetris: Type A", "Gritzy Desert", and "King Dedede's Theme"	
2009	Little King's Story	Maurice Ravel's Boléro	
2013	Kingdom Hearts HD 1.5 Remix	Orchestrations	
2014	Super Smash Bros. for Nintendo 3DS and Wii U	"Magicant / Eight Melodies", "Try, Try Again", "Route 10", and "Ryu Stage"	
2014	Kingdom Hearts HD 2.5 Remix	Arrangements, orchestrations	
2018	Super Smash Bros. Ultimate	"Kass' Theme", "Vega Stage", "Treasure Trove Cove", "Pasta", "Dance of the Blocks", "Cosmo Canyon", "Moonsiders 1st", and "Hand in Hand"	
2020	The Wonderful 101: Remastered	With several others	
2020	Kingdom Hearts: Melody of Memory	Arrangements	
2022	Live A Live HD-2D Remake	Arrangements	
2023	Super Mario RPG	Arrangements	

=== Other ===
Other works
Year	Title	Notes	Ref.
1989	G.S.M. 1500 series ~ Sweet Home	Arranged two tracks	
1992	Captain Commando -G.S.M. Capcom 5	With Alph Lyla	
1992	Game Music Festival ~Super Live '92~	With Alph Lyla	
1993	Street Fighter II Collector's Box	With Alph Lyla	
1998	Parasite Eve Remixes	With several others	
2004	Dan Doh!!	Anime	
2004	Phantasy Star Online Episode I & II Premium Arrange	With several others	
2004	Dark Chronicle Premium Arrange	With several others	
2005	Best Student Council	Anime	
2006	Rogue Galaxy Premium Arrange	With several others	
2007	Murmur	Original album, with lyrics and vocals by Chata	
2008	Drammatica: The Very Best of Yoko Shimomura		
2009	Mushihimesama Double Arrange Album	With several others	
2010	GeOnDan Rare Tracks Ver. 2.0	With several others	
2011	GeOnDan Super Rare Trax: The LAND of RISING SUN	With several others	
2012	GO! GO! Buriki Daioh!!	With several others	
2013	X'mas Collections II	With several others	
2014	memória! ~ The Very Best of Yoko Shimomura		
2014	Game Music Prayer II	With several others	
2017	Napping Princess	Anime	
2018	High Score Girl	Anime	
2019	Ladderless	"Deeply Mind"; original album by Oldcodex	
2019	?	"Nocturne"; tribute album to XXXTentacion	
2020	Yucho Pay Original Image Song #TOKIWOMEKURUYUBI		
2021	Merregnon: Land of Silence	Concert	
2022	Legend of Mana: The Teardrop Crystal	Anime	
2024	The Stories of Girls Who Couldn't Be Magicians	Anime with Hayato Matsuo and Dai Haraguchi	
2026	Undertale Piano Arrangement Album - Echoes Beneath	With several others	

== Legacy ==
Shimomura has been cited as one of the most well-known video game music composers. Shimomura's best works compilation album, titled Drammatica: The Very Best of Yoko Shimomura, was released in March 2008. The album contains compositions from Kingdom Hearts and many other games she worked on in full orchestration, with Shimomura stating that she chose music that was popular among fans and well-suited for orchestration, but had never been performed by an orchestra before. In a 2008 interview with Music4Games regarding the project, Shimomura commented that with the sheet music generated for the project, she would be interested in pursuing a live performance of Drammatica for fans if the opportunity arose. In March 2009, it was announced that Arnie Roth would conduct the Royal Stockholm Philharmonic Orchestra at the concert Sinfonia Drammatica in the Stockholm Concert Hall, which would combine music from the album with performances of Chris Hülsbeck's Symphonic Shades concert. The concert took place in August 2009. In March 2007, Shimomura released her first non-video game album, Murmur, an album of vocal songs sung by Chata.

Shimomura's music for Kingdom Hearts made up one fourth of the music of the Symphonic Fantasies concerts in September 2009, which were produced by the creators of the Symphonic Game Music Concert series and conducted by Arnie Roth. Legend of Mana's title theme was also performed by the Australian Eminence Symphony Orchestra for its classical gaming music concert A Night in Fantasia 2007.

Music from the original soundtrack of Legend of Mana was arranged for the piano and published by DOREMI Music Publishing. Two compilation books of music from the series have also been published as Seiken Densetsu Best Collection Piano Solo Sheet Music first and second editions, with the second including Shimomura's tracks from Legend of Mana. All songs in each book have been rewritten by Asako Niwa as beginning to intermediate level piano solos, though they are meant to sound as much like the originals as possible. Additionally, piano sheet music from Kingdom Hearts and Kingdom Hearts II has been published as music books by Yamaha Music Media.

Shimomura's first dedicated concert performance outside Japan was held at the Salle Cortot in Paris in November 2015. Later that same month, she performed at the El Plaza Condesa in Mexico City. In September 2016, some of her music for Final Fantasy XV was performed by the London Philharmonic Orchestra at Abbey Road Studios in London, as well as in Boston, with Shimomura herself performing on piano. Shimomura composed for the concert work Merregnon: Land of Silence. Her work was performed by the Royal Stockholm Philharmonic Orchestra and filmed at the Stockholm Concert Hall in 2021, with more performances in other locations starting in 2022.

Shimomura was honored with a Lifetime Achievement Award at the 2024 Game Developers Choice Awards and the BAFTA Fellowship award in 2025.

=== Musical style and influences ===
Shimomura lists Ludwig van Beethoven, Frédéric Chopin, and Maurice Ravel as some of her influences on her personal website. She has also stated that she has enjoyed "lounge-style jazz" for a long time. Despite these influences and her classical training, the diverse musical styles that she has used throughout her career and sometimes in the same soundtrack include "rock, electronica, oriental, ambient, industrial, pop, symphonic, operatic, chiptune, and more". She draws inspiration for her songs from things in her life that move her emotionally, which she describes as "a beautiful picture, scenery, tasting something delicious, scents that bring back memories, happy and sad things... Anything that moves my emotion gives me inspiration". Shimomura has also stated that she comes up with most of her songs when she is doing something that is "not part of [her] daily routine, like traveling." Although her influences are mostly classical, she has said that in her opinion her "style has changed dramatically over the years, though the passion for music stays the same." Shimomura has said that she believes that an important part of "the creative process behind music" is to "convey a subtle message, something that comes from your imagination and sticks with the listener, without being overly specific about what it means", rather than only writing simple themes with obvious messages. She stated her favorite composition was "Dearly Beloved" from Kingdom Hearts.
