= Breath of Fire (video game) =

1993 video game

- Japanese Super Famicom version cover art
- Developer: Capcom
- Publishers: Capcom: NA: Square Soft(SNES); EU: Ubi Soft (GBA)
- Producer: Tokuro Fujiwara
- Designers: Yoshinori Takenaka; Yoshinori Kawano; Makoto Ikehara
- Artists: Keiji Inafune; Tatsuya Yoshikawa
- Writer: Yoshinori Kawano
- Composers: Yasuaki Fujita; Mari Yamaguchi; Minae Fuji; Yoko Shimomura; Tatsuya Nishimura
- Series: Breath of Fire
- Platforms: SNES, Game Boy Advance
- Release: SNES: JP: April 3, 1993; NA: August 10, 1994; Game Boy Advance: JP: July 6, 2001; NA: December 1, 2001; EU: December 14, 2001
- Genre: Role-playing
- Mode: Single-player

Breath of Fire (Note: Released in Japan as Breath of Fire: The Dragon Warrior (ブレス オブ ファイア 竜の戦士, Buresu obu Faia: Ryū no Senshi)) is a role-playing video game developed by Capcom originally for the Super Nintendo Entertainment System. Initially released in Japan in April 1993, the game was later made available in North America in August 1994 by Square Soft, who handled the title's English localization and promotion. It is the first entry in the Breath of Fire series.

Recognized by Capcom as their first traditional role-playing video game, Breath of Fire would set the precedent for future entries in the series, and features character designs artist Keiji Inafune, as well as music by members of Capcom's in-house sound team Alph Lyla. The game has been re-released multiple times, being released for the Game Boy Advance in 2001, the Wii U in 2015, the New Nintendo 3DS in 2016 and the Nintendo Switch on the SNES Nintendo Classics in 2019.

Set in a fantasy world, Breath of Fire follows the journey of a boy named Ryu, one of the last surviving members of an ancient race with the ability to transform into mighty dragons, as he searches the world for his sister. During his quest, Ryu meets other warriors who share his quest, and comes into conflict with the Dark Dragon Clan, a militaristic empire who seeks to take over the world by reviving a mad goddess. The game experienced mostly positive reception upon release, and was followed by a direct sequel, Breath of Fire II, in 1994.

== Gameplay ==
Breath of Fire is a traditional role-playing video game, featuring two-dimensional character sprites and environments presented from a top-down perspective. Players move their characters in four directions while navigating through a number of environments ranging from towns to dungeons filled with traps and monsters. In order to advance the story, the player must take part in story-based scenarios that require them to enter dangerous areas and defeat enemies while also interacting with non-player characters to become involved in the plot.

A battle in Breath of Fire, showing Ryu transformed into a dragon

During gameplay the player's main character, Ryu, will meet other characters that join his party, each with their own distinct abilities in and out of battle. These include differing magic spells as well as unique Personal Actions that can be performed in certain situations that allow the player to interact with the game world, solve puzzles, or navigate environments more easily. A player's active group can consist of up to four members at a time, but may switch any of them with reserve members at any time, even in the middle of battle. The game uses an icon-based menu system that organizes the player's stock of items, equipment, and character information, with subsystem shortcuts than can be set to unused buttons on the game controller for ease of access. As the game progresses, players may purchase or find items and equipment that can aid each character and make them stronger.

Players advance the game by doing battle with enemy creatures. Combat in Breath of Fire takes place in hostile areas such as dungeons, with encounters occurring randomly every few steps. The game uses a turn-based system while in combat, where the player inputs commands for each character at the start of each round, which are then carried out by order of their "agility" rating. While each controllable character's health is indicated by numerical hit points, an enemy's vitality is represented by a colored bar that decreases as they take damage, and must be reduced to nothing in order to be defeated. Stronger boss characters have the ability to continue battle even after their health bar is depleted, with their true remaining health being obscured for the rest of the battle. Characters can cast spells to harm enemies or aid their allies, which require AP (Ability Points) in order to be cast. When a player defeats all enemies present, they are awarded with experience points that go towards leveling up characters, making them stronger and giving them access to new spells. Progress is saved in one of three slots using the game cartridge's internal battery back-up, which can be accessed by dragon statues at certain points throughout the game.

== Plot ==
=== Characters ===
Each character hails from a different clan made up of anthropomorphic animal-like beings or humans with fantastic powers, with their assortment of magic spells and personal field abilities that can be used out of battle to help the player progress through the game and find hidden items.

The playable characters of Breath of Fire

The main character is a young man named Ryu, one of the last surviving members of the Light Dragon Clan, who have been driven to near-extinction by their enemy, the Dark Dragon Clan. When his sister, Sara, is captured by the Dark Dragons, Ryu must travel the world searching for a way to get her back, as well as unlock his latent ability to transform into powerful dragons. During gameplay, the player can meet and recruit seven additional party members, including Nina, princess of the Kingdom of Windia whose race can transform into large birds; Bo (Gilliam in the Japanese version), a wolf-man held prisoner by the Dark Dragons after they attacked his homeland; Karn (Danc in the Japanese version), member of an ancient order of thieves with the ability to merge two or more party members together to create powerful fighters; Gobi (Manillo in the Japanese version), a fish-man and traveling merchant who can transform into a giant fish; Ox (Builder in the Japanese version), a large ox-man from a town of blacksmiths; Mogu, a mole-person with the ability to dig holes in certain areas; and Bleu (Deis in the Japanese version), an immortal sorceress with a snake-like lower body who commands powerful magic.

The principal antagonists are the Dark Dragon Clan, a militaristic empire made up of soldiers that can transform into dragons. They are led by Emperor Zog (Zorgon in the Japanese version), who seeks to take over the world by gaining the power of the Goddess Tyr (Myria in the Japanese version as well as the English version of the third game), who was sealed away centuries ago by the Light Dragons using six magic keys that have been scattered across the world. His main general is Jade (Judas in the Japanese version), who in turn commands his Four Devas: Cort (Kyura in the Japanese version), a mad scientist; Mote (Sigmund in the Japanese version), a wizard who has the power to terrorize people in their dreams; Cerl (Carla in the Japanese version), a half-breed magic user who resents her past mistreatment by humans; and Goda, an armored goliath.

=== Story ===
Breath of Fire takes place in an unnamed medieval fantasy world. In addition to ordinary humans, it is populated by various "clans" of anthropomorphic animals. The Dragon Clan, a race of humans who are able to transform into dragons, differ from the others in that their members appear (for the most part) to be human. The back-story of the game is summarized during its prologue: Thousands of years ago, a goddess named Myria (also known as "Tyr" and "Maria" in some English translations and "Miria" in Breath of Fire II) sowed discord amongst the Dragon Clan by offering to grant any wish. Feuding over the goddess' favor eventually split the Clan into two feuding sides, the Light Dragons and the Dark Dragons, who engaged in a war. Myria encouraged the fighting and watched the war escalate. Just as the world was on the brink of destruction, the "Goddess War" ended when a heroic Light Dragon imprisoned Myria and sealed her away using six keys. Each key has a unique magical property which affects the surrounding landscape; the Light Key is hidden in the port town of Auria, providing boundless prosperity for its residents. Alternatively, the Dark Key resides near the slums of Bleak, accounting for that town's perpetual darkness.

The Dark Dragons continue to hunt their longtime enemies, the Light Dragons, and have driven them into isolation. Unbeknownst to the Dark Dragons, the Light Dragon Clan sealed away its dragon powers long ago. The game's protagonist, Ryu, is living peacefully in Drogon, a village of Light Dragons survivors. Ryu was orphaned when he was young and was raised by his sister, Sara, a priestess who can summon powerful magic. One night he dreams of a dragon that warns him of impending danger; he awakens to find his village has been set ablaze. Sara uses her magic to draw the Dark Dragons away from Ryu and the other villagers, but is taken prisoner. The Dark Dragon Emperor, Zog, has announced that it is the birthright of the Dark Dragons to conquer the planet. Zog intends to release Myria by assembling the six Goddess keys. However, it could be that Zog is about to make a mistake that will lead the world to its destruction instead, so Ryu leaves the village and embarks on a quest to collect the keys before Zog can.

Ryu's first destination is the town of Nanai, under which the Earth Key is sealed. He seizes the key from the Dark Dragon forces stationed there, but ends up leveling the town doing so since the Earth Key governs seismic activity. He then travels to Windia ("Winlan" in the official translation) but discovers that the King there has been poisoned. He briefly meets Nina, the princess of Windia, and then has to rescue her from the tower of Karma after her mission to obtain the remedy for her father goes awry due to the use of a toxic weapon called Xeon Gas, which was seemingly developed by the Dark Dragons. Once Nina's father recovers, Nina elects to join Ryu on his further adventures, and the two next travel to Tantar, the home of the wolf-like Forest Clan. They eventually discover that the chieftain of the neighboring village of Tuntar is an impostor working for the Dark Dragon Empire. Ryu and Nina venture to a nearby forest to rescue the real chief, but end up walking into a trap. Fortunately, they and the real chief are rescued by Bo, a warrior of the Forest Clan who had just escaped the custody of the Dark Dragons. He also joins them on their quest and helps them locate another Goddess Key, the Space Key.

En route to the port town of Auria, Ryu, Nina and Bo find a mysterious shrine. It is here that Ryu is forced to undergo a great trial: once he completes it, his dragon powers awaken. At Auria, the trio are mistaken for thieves and arrested, but Karn, a thief they meet inside their cell, frees them. They meet Karn again inside a tomb in the desert, and when they recover a tome containing thieving secrets, he joins the team. Back at Auria, the party discovers that the Dark Dragons have blackmailed the town's richest resident into surrendering the Light Key. They manage to foil this plot, however, by claiming the Dark Key and the Mirror from a tower near the thieves' town of Bleak and using the Mirror to allow the rich man's wife to communicate with him from beyond the grave. However, the Dark Dragons then resort to more aggressive tactics and sink the ship the party planned to board. The captain of the ship and the gold digging merchant Gobi approach the group with a plan to obtain a new ship. Their new ship is sunk as well, though, stranding them on a desert island. In order for the party to continue their quest, Gobi ventures forth alone and succeeds in acquiring the Gills, which allow Ryu and his friends to breathe underwater, and they continue on their way with Gobi as a companion.

The party's next stop is the underwater city of Prima. Gobi leads them to one of the inns there, where an aspiring blacksmith is on his sickbed while a ghost waits to take his soul into the beyond. Upon defeating the ghost, the blacksmith delivers some alarming news: the Dark Dragons are developing a new weapon and have taken the blacksmiths of the industrial town of Gant prisoner so they can build it for them. The party promises to help the blacksmith rescue his friends and family. He introduces himself as Ox and takes the party to the castle of Nabal, where the people of Gant are imprisoned. It is here that the true nature of the Dark Dragons' new weapon is revealed; a torpedo which can be used to level Prima. Ox tags along with the group as they seek the immortal witch Bleu, who has taken up residence in a moving town in the desert. With Bleu's help, the party are able to thwart the Dark Dragons' scheme to destroy Prima with the torpedo. Ox and Bleu realize the gravity of the current situation and pledge their skills to Ryu's cause. The party's adventure continues after Karn obtains the ability to fuse his comrades together, and Gobi gains the ability to transform into a giant fish using a special item.

The group continues to an underground settlement, clashing with the evil scientist and Four Devas member Cort along the way. When they arrive, they discover that one of the warriors there, a young mole person named Mogu, has been imprisoned in the Dream World by Mote, another of the Four Devas. They rescue him from the dream by obtaining a special item from Tunlan, where the Time Key is also kept (the group loses this key when Four Deva member Cerl takes it). Mogu joins the party when he is rescued, and the party next travels to the town of Spring. The Sky Key is kept in a tower near the town, but someone has used it to create a permanent winter in the area. While investigating the tower, the party discover that the culprit is Mote, and fight him within the Dream World with the aid of his conscience. After restoring the weather to normal, the party continue towards the Dark Dragon capital of Scande, but are delayed once more when they enter the town of Carmen where time is standing still. Aided by a villager named Alan, they investigate a nearby tower and confront Cerl again, who is revealed to be a childhood friend of Alan's. Consumed with a desire for vengeance against humans, she attacks and critically wounds Alan, but later swears off her vendetta when the party delivers a fruit from the village where she and Alan grew up. The final Deva Goda then appears and ambushes the party. Cerl surrenders the Time Key to Ryu's party and stays behind to cover their escape while Alan enters Cerl's castle to be with her again. While restoring the flow of time, however, something goes wrong and Nina is forced out of the party by a warping of time and space.

The party finds her moments later in Tunlan. However, she is suffering from amnesia. When the party restores her memories, the now visibly older Nina rejoins them and tells everyone that she can transform into the Great Bird. With her new ability, the party flies to Scande, where they fight with Zog and vanquish him. Afterwards, Jade traps them in a room with Sara. Jade plays on Ryu's emotions by placing Sara under a powerful mind control spell. Sara takes the keys from Ryu and delivers them to Jade. The party pursues him to the tower where Myria is sealed, but are stopped midway through the tower by Sara, who attacks them. The party is forced to kill her to break Jade's hold on her as the mind control is too strong to completely dispel any other way. As she lies dying, she tells Ryu and his friends that they have done nothing wrong; Jade and Myria are to blame as they created a situation where she had to die. The party resolves to stop Jade at any cost, but are too late to prevent him from completely freeing Myria.

Ryu wakes up three days later in his hometown, which is still in ruins. He learns from his comrades and the surviving Light Dragon members that Jade has unearthed the Obelisk from beneath Scande and that he, Goda and Myria have taken up residence within. They infiltrate the Obelisk with the assistance of Mogu's clan. Goda attempts to bar their path within the Obelisk, but is defeated. The party presses on to find Jade, who is enraptured by the power of Myria and engages the party in battle, but is defeated and slain. He ominously announces that the party will soon face the fell goddess responsible for the Goddess War thousands of years ago.

The party confronts Myria in the deepest room of the Obelisk, initially in the guise of a defenseless female. However, when Ryu uses the ultimate dragon power against her, Myria becomes enraged and transforms herself into a demon. The party battles her one final time and defeat her. She vows to return and destroys the ground under the party's feet. They are rescued by Nina's clan and taken to Wyndia, where Ryu sees Sara's apparition one last time. She expresses pride in Ryu for defeating Myria when the Light Dragon Warrior of the past failed to do so. The party members go their separate ways and devote themselves to reconstruction efforts across the globe; now that the war is over.

== Development ==
Breath of Fire was developed by Capcom for the Super NES by designer Yoshinori Kawano (credited as Botunori) and producer Tokuro Fujiwara, previously known as the creator of the Ghosts 'n Goblins series. Keiji Inafune (credited in the staff credits, as Inafking) designed the game's characters. However, Inafune's supervisor took him off the project and replaced him with Tatsuya Yoshikawa. The latter artist kept many of Inafune's design features in the new illustrations. Capcom added easter eggs into the game in the form of cameo appearances by characters from other company franchises, including Chun-Li from Street Fighter. The game's English release in August 1994 was a joint effort between Capcom USA and Square Soft, who handled most of the title's localization and promotion in North America due to Capcom USA's lack of experience with text-heavy role-playing games. Square Soft would feature the game in the fourth issue of its North American newsletter, The Ogopogo Examiner, and would advertise the game as being "from the makers of the Final Fantasy series". Breath of Fire's English localization was handled primarily by Ted Woolsey, whose previous works included Final Fantasy Legend III, Final Fantasy Mystic Quest, and Secret of Mana. Because of space limitations in game's text fields, many items, as well as character and spell names had to be truncated in order to fit, resulting in numerous abbreviations.

In March 2001, Capcom Japan announced that Breath of Fire would be ported to Nintendo's Game Boy Advance handheld system with new features and a more "intuitive" gameplay system. The new version includes re-drawn character portraits, as well as a re-designed menu system that resembles Breath of Fire II, along with updated cutscene graphics at certain points during gameplay. Additionally, Capcom added the ability for players to temporarily save their progress at any point using a new "quick save" feature, as well as a new dash button that allows for faster movement through the game. Using the Game Boy Advance link cable, two players may also exchange items between game cartridges using a new trade feature. Two months before the 2001 Electronic Entertainment Expo in Los Angeles, Capcom USA announced that they would be publishing an English version of the game initially for release the following September.

=== Audio ===
The music for Breath of Fire was composed by four members of Capcom's sound team Alph Lyla: Yasuaki Fujita, Mari Yamaguchi, Minae Fuji, and Yoko Shimomura, originally credited under the pseudonyms "Bun Bun", "Mari", "Ojarin", and "Pii♪", respectively. Tatsuya Nishimura also composed music and sound effects for the game, but remained uncredited. Although no official soundtrack for the game was made available during its original release, the background themes from the title would later be included on the Breath of Fire Original Soundtrack Special Box released in March 2006, which featured music from the first five games of the series. To help promote the title, Capcom used the song "Running Wild" by Toshi and rock band the Night Hawks in the game's television commercial in Japan, with a re-recorded version featuring slightly different lyrics called "Breath of Fire" later appearing on the Night Hawks' June 1994 album The Midnight Hawks.

== Re-releases ==
In 2001, the game was re-released for the Game Boy Advance handheld system with new save features and minor graphical enhancements, with the English version being released in Europe for the first time. Breath of Fire was re-released on the Virtual Console service on Wii U. In 2016, it was released for the New Nintendo 3DS's Virtual Console. In 2019, it was released for the Nintendo Switch on the SNES Nintendo Classics.

== Reception ==
Contemporary reviews

Review scores
Publication	Score
Electronic Gaming Monthly	8/10, 8/10, 7/10, 8/10, 9/10
Famitsu	8/10, 7/10, 7/10, 6/10
Game Informer	9/10
GameFan	274/300
Electronic Games	A+

=== Contemporary ===
Breath of Fire met with "considerable success" during its original release in Japan. While the title was initially only "modestly successful" in North America, Nintendo Power noted a spike in sales following the release of the game's sequel in December 1995, calling it "a rare second wind".

The game was mostly well received by critics during its release in North America in 1994. Game Informer awarded it a score of 9 out of 10. Electronic Gaming Monthly praised the title's "excellent graphics and sound", ultimately stating that "Even if you're not a fan of these kinds of more deliberately-paced games, you'll still get hooked on this one!" Its five reviewers gave it ratings of 8, 8, 7, 8 and 9 out of 10. GameFan's three reviewers gave it scores of 94, 90 and 90 out of 100, concluding that it has "beautiful art work, a great story, very good fight scenes, and some of the most amazing music". Nintendo Power praised its level of exploration and found it to be "not as linear as other RPGs such as Final Fantasy II", but said that its plot was relatively standard and contained "more fighting than adventure fans might like". GamePro similarly felt that the game's story was "nondescript and average" and that Capcom "should have tried for more interesting enemies, different battle screens, or butt-kicking graphics", finding the overall experience to be "bland". Electronic Games gave it a full A+ rating, stating that it is "considerably longer" than Final Fantasy II and "superior in every way" to Wizardry V and Eye of the Beholder, and concluded that "Capcom's masterpiece" has "all of the necessary elements of a top-notch RPG".

=== Retrospective ===
Retrospective reception

Aggregate scores
Aggregator	Score	
Aggregator	GBA	SNES
GameRankings	75%	70%
Metacritic	79%	

Review scores
Publication	Score	
Publication	GBA	SNES
AllGame	3/5	3.5/5
Electronic Gaming Monthly	7.5/10	
Game Informer	8/10	
GamePro	4/5	
GameSpot	7.7/10	
GameSpy		8/10
IGN	7.6/10	
Nintendo Power	4/5	
Play	8/10	

Retrospectively, the Super NES version maintains a 78% average score on aggregate review website GameRankings.

The game's re-release on the Game Boy Advance maintains a 76% review average on Game Rankings and a 79% on Metacritic. It debuted on the Japanese software charts as the third highest-selling game of its first week, selling 22,236 copies, and would go on to sell a total of 63,407 copies in the region by the end of 2001.

Play Magazine called the game's port job from the Super NES "flawed in execution", commenting on handheld version's high color saturation and lower sound quality. GameSpot felt that the game was overall a faithful translation of the original, but that the music sounded "tinny" when compared to its predecessor, also stating that "While it's not the best-looking or most technically impressive RPG out for the system, Breath of Fire is still a rock-solid game." IGN would also comment on the game's presentation, declaring that it was "not much more than your typical Japanese-style RPG" and that its graphics were outdone by titles developed specifically for the system, additionally lambasting its high random encounter rate and simplistic puzzles, and ultimately calling Breath of Fire "a decent diversion". Electronic Gaming Monthly took note of the conversion's shortcomings, but praised its new save feature that allowed players to stop the game at any time, declaring that "Overall, BoF exemplifies hand-held role-playing done right." Other publications such as Game Informer recommended the game to anyone who "likes RPGs", along with Nintendo Power who referred to it as an "excellent epic that still holds up". GamePro found the title to be "an enjoyable RPG that easily kills spare time" but that it was overall less involving than later games in the series, calling its narrative "lifeless".

=== Accolades ===
In 1997, Breath of Fire was ranked 82nd in Nintendo Power's list of the top 100 games released on Nintendo consoles, and in 2006, it placed 161st in the magazine's top 200. In 2002, Breath of Fire became runner-up for "Best Game Boy Advance Role-Playing Game" in IGN's Best of 2001 awards. In 2018, Complex rated Breath of Fire 27th on their "The Best Super Nintendo Games of All Time". IGN ranked the game 43rd in its Top 100 SNES Games.

== Legacy ==
Breath of Fire influenced two officially licensed manga which were first serialized in Japanese magazines. The first, Breath of Fire: Ryū no Senshi by Hiroshi Yakumo, is a re-telling of the events of the video game which was first published in Family Computer Magazine before being released as a two-volume collection by Tokuma Shoten. The manga embellishes on certain parts of the plot while omitting others entirely, and introduces new characters such as Bo's son Dele. The second, Breath of Fire: Tsubasa no Oujo (ブレス オブ ファイア -翼の王女-, lit. Breath of Fire: Princess of the Wings) by Kouji Hayato, takes place after the events of the game and focuses on the relationship between Ryu and Nina, and first appeared in Monthly Shōnen Jump before also being released in a two-volume compilation by Shueisha Jump Comics. Hayato followed up the manga with a side-story called Breath of Fire Part II: Chiisana Boukensha (ブレスオブファイア PART2 ~小さな冒険者~, lit. Breath of Fire Part 2: Little Adventurers), which featured the adventures of Ryu and Bo's sons, which was later released as its own single volume.
