= Osaka College of Music =

Private university in Toyonaka, Japan

- 大阪音楽大学
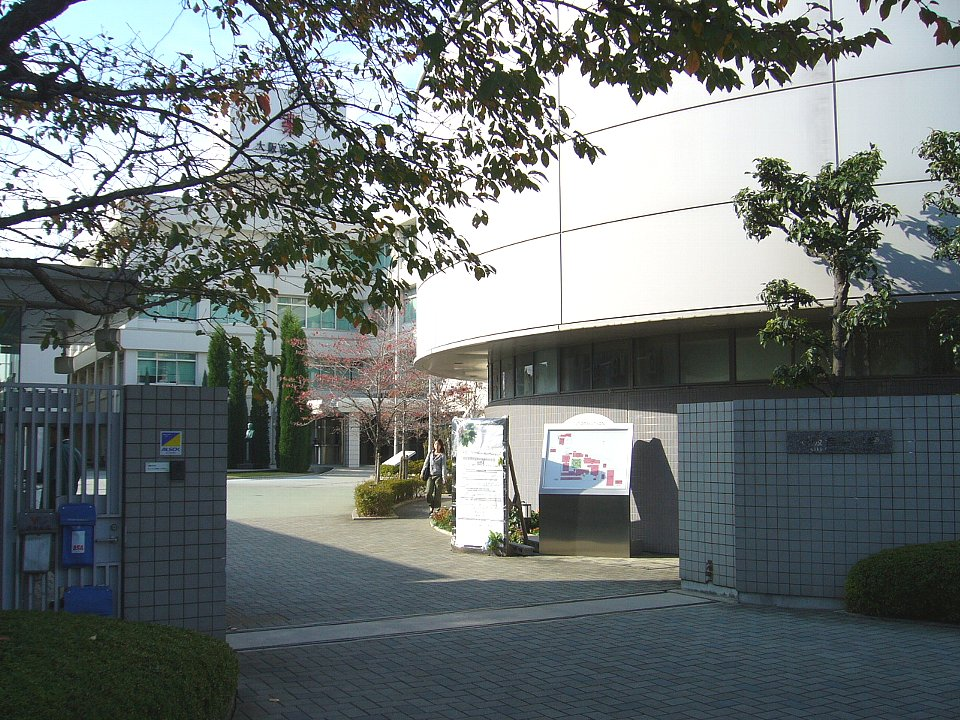
- Osaka College of Music
- Type: Private, Music
- Established: October 15, 1958
- Founder: Kōji Nagai
- Chairman: Takayoshi Nakamura
- President: Hideki Motoyama
- Academic staff: 488(May 2022)
- Undergraduates: 790(2020/2021)
- Postgraduates: 37(2020/2021)
- Location: Toyonaka, Osaka Prefecture, Japan; 34°45′12.06″N 135°28′14.52″E
- Campus: Suburb
- Website: www.daion.ac.jp

Osaka College of Music (大阪音楽大学, Ōsaka ongaku daigaku) is a private university in Toyonaka, Osaka Prefecture, Japan. The predecessor of the school was established as a university in 1958.

== Undergraduate majors ==
This college has following undergraduate majors

- Music Business
- Composition
- Music Creation
- Music Communication
- Vocal
- Piano
  - Piano Course
  - Piano Instruction Course
  - Piano Performance Special Course
- Pipe Organ
- Wind Instruments
- String Instrument
  - String Instrument Course
  - Violin Performance Special Course
- Percussion
- Classic Guitar/Mandolin Performance
- Japanese Music
- Jazz
- Electronic Organ
- Vocal Performance
- Popular Instrument

== Graduate school ==
This college has following postgraduate majors

- Composition Major
  - Composition Research Room
  - Musicology Research Room
- Vocal Performance Major
  - Opera Research Room
  - Song Research Room
- Instrumental Music Major
  - Piano Research Room
  - Wind, String and Percussion Instruments Research Room

== Notable alumni ==
Singer Aiko Yanai studied here in 1995 along with Ringo Shiina.

Composer Yoko Shimomura graduated from this university in 1988.

Conductor Tomomi Nishimoto graduated from this university in 1994.

== See also ==
- Osaka Junior College of Music
