= Pipistrello and the Cursed Yoyo =

2025 video game

- Developer: Pocket Trap
- Publisher: PM Studios
- Director: Henrique Lorenzi
- Producer: Henrique Caprino
- Designer: Henrique Lorenzi
- Programmer: Henrique Lorenzi
- Artist: Rodrigo Zangelmi
- Writer: Rodrigo Zangelmi
- Composers: Leonardo Lima; Henrique Lorenzi
- Engine: Unity
- Platforms: Nintendo Switch; Nintendo Switch 2; PlayStation 4; PlayStation 5; Windows; Xbox One; Xbox Series X/S
- Release: May 28, 2025; Nintendo Switch 2 August 20, 2026
- Genre: Platform-adventure
- Mode: Single player

Pipistrello and the Cursed Yoyo is a 2025 platform-adventure game developed by Pocket Trap and published by PM Studios. It was released for Nintendo Switch, PlayStation 4, PlayStation 5, Windows, Xbox One and Xbox Series X/S in May. The player takes on the role of Pippit, a member of the powerful Pipistrello family. After his aunt faces an attack by business rivals of the family, her soul is fragmented and trapped in mega-batteries to be used by their businesses. Pippit sets out with the last fragment in a cursed yoyo to recover the mega-batteries and reassemble her soul. The gameplay is reminiscent of Game Boy Advance games, notably from The Legend of Zelda.

== Gameplay ==
The game is presented in an open world, top-down flip screen format; in a tongue-in-cheek manner the game is described by the developers as a "yoyovania". Both combat and the game's various puzzles revolve around the use of yoyo tricks, with Pippit manipulating the yoyo to strike enemies and switches. The yoyo can bounce off diagonal surfaces for example, which can be used to strike enemies from behind if lined up correctly. The game is divided into four main areas, each of which contain a boss who guards one of the four mega-batteries Pipistrello is collecting.

Taking on and fulfilling contracts with Pippit's cousin Pepita offers a way to earn passive abilities, while collectible badges grant alternative or improved moves. The number of simultaneous equippable badges is limited by badge points, and expanding this allows for greater badge capacity. Badge point containers can be found across the game world, along with petal containers which offer increased health.

== Plot ==
Pippit is a member of the Pipistrello family, who have a monopolistic grip on the city's energy supply. Pippit has no involvement with the family business, instead only showing interest in yoyo tournaments. After his aunt- the CEO- faces a botched attack, her soul is split into five pieces. Four of these are trapped in mega-batteries, vast power sources which are abused by the family's foes in the city, while the fifth is trapped in Pippit's yoyo. Pippit and his aunt, who inhabits the cursed yoyo, set out to retrieve the four mega-batteries and reconstruct her soul. Along the way, Pippit must confront his family's actions and the come to terms with the character of his aunt.

== Development ==
Pipistrello and the Cursed Yoyo was developed by Pocket Trap, an indie game studio from Brazil, and published by PM Studios. The game was announced in March 2024 and was initially slated to release for Windows. In April the same year, Pipistrello was shown off with hands-on demo stations at PAX East. In March 2025, the companies announced a May 28 launch, a playable demo, and a retail collector's edition that includes a physical copy of the game (Switch/PS5) and a plushie of the main protagonist, Pippit. Pipistrello and the Cursed Yoyo's soundtrack was composed by Leonardo Lima and Henrique Lorenzi, with a guest track contributed by Yoko Shimomura.

== Reception ==
Pipistrello and the Cursed Yoyo received positive reviews on Metacritic. Fellow review aggregator OpenCritic assessed that the game received "mighty" approval, being recommended by 98% of critics. Eurogamer was positive about the title, comparing it favourably to Link's Awakening while acknowledging that it was not simply a clone. The yoyo trick related gameplay was well received. Kotaku described the game as the best of PAX East that year.
