= Radiant Historia =

2010 video game

- North American Nintendo DS box art
- Developers: Atlus; Headlock
- Publishers: JP: Atlus; NA: Atlus USA; PAL: Deep Silver (3DS)
- Directors: Mitsuru Hirata; Satoshi Takayashiki
- Designers: Tomohiro Okuno; Yasuko Sumiya; Satoshi Takayashiki
- Programmer: Daisuke Yajima
- Artists: Hiroshi Konishi; Masaki Hirooka (3DS)
- Writers: Yoh Haduki; Souzou Tonami; Kazuhito Okayama
- Composer: Yoko Shimomura
- Platforms: Nintendo DS; Nintendo 3DS
- Release: Nintendo DS: JP: November 3, 2010; NA: February 22, 2011; Nintendo 3DS: JP: June 29, 2017; NA: February 13, 2018; EU: February 16, 2018; AU: February 23, 2018
- Genre: Role-playing
- Mode: Single-player

Radiant Historia (Note: Japanese: ラジアントヒストリア, Hepburn: Rajianto Hisutoria) is a role-playing video game developed by Atlus and Headlock and published by Atlus for the Nintendo DS. It was released in Japan in 2010 and in North America in 2011. An expanded remake for the Nintendo 3DS, titled Radiant Historia: Perfect Chronology, was released in Japan in 2017 and in North America and Europe the following year, with the European version being published by Deep Silver.

The game is set on Vainqueur, a continent divided between the warring nations of Alistel and Granorg. Alistel soldier Stocke is chosen to wield the White Chronicle, a tome capable of navigating multiple timelines, so he may prevent Vainqueur's desertification. Stocke and his party explore Vainqueur, fighting enemies on a grid-based battlefield using a turn-based system. Travelling between alternate timelines is a key part of both the storyline and the gameplay, with the number of potential timelines unlocked influencing the ending.

Radiant Historia was developed by a team with staff drawn from both Atlus' Megami Tensei series and the tri-Ace title Radiata Stories. First proposed by Satoshi Takayashiki in 2007, the base concept underwent several changes due to suggestions from Atlus staff. The remake included redrawn artwork, voice acting, an additional story path, and an animated opening produced by A-1 Pictures. The music for both versions was composed by Yoko Shimomura, with theme songs performed by Haruka Shimotsuki.

Reception and sales for both versions have been positive, with both reaching high sales chart positions in Japan and the West. The original received praise for its gameplay and time travel mechanics, though opinions were mixed on its graphics and linear structure. Several critics compared it favourably to role-playing games from the 16-bit gaming era. The remake saw a generally positive response, with many praising the added story and gameplay content.

== Gameplay ==
Radiant Historia is a role-playing video game (RPG) set in a fantasy world and following a group of characters traveling across the war-torn continent of Vainqueur. The game's environments are explored from a top-down perspective, with different zones opening up during the course of the narrative. These self-contained environments are accessed using a world map, and can then be freely explored. Within these environments following the game's opening mission, the main character Stocke can manipulate boxes to clear paths and solve puzzles, in addition to other elements such as destructible objects and treasure chests containing consumables or items such as armor and weapons.

=== Time travel ===
Traveling between parallel timelines forms a key mechanic within Radiant Historia, with the percentage of timelines explored influencing the ending.

A key part of Radiant Historia is navigating a series of branching stories spread across alternate timelines using a book called the White Chronicle. Given to main protagonist Stocke during the game's opening, it is used to travel between different timelines during the course of the story. After its first use, the White Chronicle can be used to time travel at special points scattered through the game world. Following a key choice within the story, there are two main timelines and numerous smaller branches from those timelines. Several events within one timeline can only be completed using information or items gathered from the alternate timeline. Events in both timelines are recorded in a journal that can be accessed through the party menu.

Aside from points where the story dictates the player's action, navigating the timelines is a non-linear process. Story segments within each timeline, called "nodes", are color-coded depending on its content; brown nodes are chapters of the main story, blue boxes are events in which the player can make a choice which creates new paths in the timeline and can be revisited to take a different path, and dark boxes indicate a node with a bad ending or no way to continue the narrative. Experience points and currency earned in battles are carried over between timelines. Events across each timeline are tied to side quests the player can complete. While there are multiple endings depending on the path taken by the player, there are only two canon endings; the standard version, and an extended version unlocked by completing all side quests.

=== Battle system ===
Combat in Radiant Historia uses a grid-based arena and turn-based battle system, incorporating manipulation of turn order and grid position.

Enemies, represented by sprites, are visible while exploring environments. Running into them will trigger a battle, but Stocke can stun them with his sword and either avoid battle or trigger a preemptive attack. A cloaking ability unlocked later in the game enables the party to slip by enemies unseen. Battles take place in a separate arena, with the battle itself and turn order information being displayed respectively on the bottom and top screen. There is an auto-battle function, where the party will automatically perform basic attacks. Successfully defeating the enemy party rewards the player party with money and experience points which level up the party members, giving them higher statistics such as raised health and more powerful attacks.

The arena is divided between Stocke's three-person party and the enemy group. The battlefield itself is laid out on a 3x3 grid, with enemy units being positioned in different squares of the grid, with some enemy types taking up multiple squares. The player party's position is fixed, but enemy units can use their turn to change position on the grid. The battle system itself is turn-based, with each unit on either side being given a chance to perform an action. Rather than each unit acting once an action is decided, each action is queued once selected, and when all actions are selected the two sides perform their actions. The type of actions an enemy unit can perform depends upon their position on the grid; enemies positioned further back have weaker attack power and strong defence, while those at the front will receive more damage while having a higher attack power.

The player party can use specific actions to knock enemy units onto different squares of the grid, which can send enemies into prepared traps, or group enemies into a single square. When the latter happens, attacking the unit within that square using either standard or combination attacks will damage all units. Once the player turn ends, enemy units return to their original positions on the grid. Chaining attacks together increases their effectiveness, which in turn grants a greater reward at the end of a battle. Players can use the "Change" mechanic to shift a unit's place in the action queue to another point in the queue, allowing them to take more actions than might otherwise be possible. This may be either a party member or an enemy. Using the Change command causes a unit to take more damage until their action is completed.

== Plot ==
Radiant Historia is set on the continent of Vainqueur, a land populated by humans and Beastribes. Once ruled by an ancient empire, it is now divided between the warring kingdoms of Alistel and Granorg; the root of the war stems from Alistel's belief that Granorg is responsible for the spread of the Sand Plague, a magical illness which drains living beings of their Mana energy and turns them to sand—the desertification of the continent is spreading, further inflaming the conflict. Stocke, an espionage agent for Alistel, is sent by his superior Heiss on a mission with mercenaries Raynie and Marco to escort a spy back to Alistel's capital; before leaving, Stocke is given a book called the "White Chronicle" by Heiss. The group are ambushed by Granorg troops, with only a severely wounded Stocke escaping. He is drawn into Historia, a realm divorced from time, and told by its overseers Teo and Lippti that he can use the White Chronicle to alter events. Stocke makes the mission a success, saving Raynie and Marco along the way.

Over the course of his adventure, Stocke follows two different timelines; one where he remains under Heiss, and one where he becomes part of a military unit led by his friend Rosch. He uses skills acquired in each timeline to proceed further in each role, while also interacting with the Beastmen tribes, particularly the young shaman Aht and the sympathetic warrior Gafka. During his travels, someone wielding the Black Chronicle—a twin to the White Chronicle—is trying to interfere with his efforts. In both timelines he aids and is aided by Granorg's princess Eruca, who is capable of performing a ritual to stop the Sand Plague consuming Vainqueur with a sacrificed human soul. He also learns that Hugo, a prominent religious leader of Alistel, has formed a pact with Granorg to depose its ruling queen Protea and is manipulating the war for his own ends; and that Heiss is acting for his own agenda, playing both sides against each other, and has intimate knowledge of the White Chronicle.

In both timelines, Stocke successfully overthrows Protea and defeats Hugo. Heiss then reveals that the ritual's sacrifices are Granorg royalty who are resurrected using part of another person's soul, then killed again to reunite the soul and stabilize Vainqueur's mana, slowing the Sand Plague. Stocke is revealed to be the intended sacrifice, Eruca's brother resurrected and given a part of Eruca's soul. Heiss, Stocke's uncle, believing the ritual and the sacrifice's suffering to be pointless, intends to let the Sand Plague consume Vainqueur; he abducted Stocke, gave him his present identity, and has been using the Black Chronicle to try and show Stocke the futility of the sacrifice's mission. From Heiss and Teo and Lippti, Stocke learns that the Sand Plague was caused by a runaway spell intended to stabilize the world's mana and ensure the prosperity of the ancient empire. The empire's surviving royalty created the Black and White Chronicle to facilitate the ritual, allowing the Sacrifice to see hope in the future while the Caster meditated on the past; Teo and Lippti are the remnants of the sorcerer who created the Chronicles. Heiss was the intended Sacrifice, but escaped with the Black Chronicle, which ingrained his fatalistic views.

After thwarting Heiss' attempts to change history in his favor, Heiss transports the party to Historia, fusing with the souls of past sacrifices to become the monster Apocrypha; Stocke and his party defeat Heiss while destroying Apocrypha. In the normal ending, Stocke willingly becomes the sacrifice, allowing the ritual's completion and delaying the Sand Plague's advance. In the true ending—unlocked by completing all events across the game—Heiss willingly becomes the sacrifice in Stocke's place upon seeing Stocke's unshaken faith in the future, allowing Stocke to return to the world and live a full life. The other characters work to help Vainqueur rebuild, including beginning research into ways of stabilizing mana which will negate the ritual and the need for sacrifices.

The expanded storyline of Perfect Chronology has Stocke interacting with a woman named Nemesia aboard a ship existing outside time; collecting artifacts, Stocke helps Nemesia bring together a third magical book dubbed the Red Chronicle with the aim of stopping the desertification. Once all the artifacts are retrieved, Stocke persuades Heiss to lend the power of the Black Chronicle, then reunites with the group and Nemesia. Nemesia reveals that the desertification is caused by a Mana-consuming entity dubbed the Singularity, created by the Empire's experiments on Nemesia's secret lover Rhodan when creating the Chronicles. Using the three Chronicles' combined powers, the party destroy the Singularity, negating the need for the sacrifice. Nemesia chooses to stay with the comatose Rhodan outside time. In their own world, the characters settle down to normal lives, with Stocke and Heiss parting as friends. Nemesia and Rhodan—who is beginning to recover from his coma—are brought into the real world by Stocke using a newly generated artifact from the Red Chronicle.

== Development ==
Radiant Historia was co-developed by Atlus, a company best known for the Megami Tensei series, and Japanese studio Headlock. Staff members had worked on both Shin Megami Tensei: Strange Journey and Radiata Stories, a 2005 PlayStation 2 role-playing game developed by tri-Ace and published by Square Enix. From Radiata Stories, original concept designer Satoshi Takayashiki acted as co-director and concept designer, while artist Hiroshi Konishi reprised his role as character designer. The director was Mitsuru Hirata from Atlus. Having previously as a planner for multiple Megami Tensei titles, Radiant Historia was his debut as director. Field planner Tatsuya Watanabe, battle planner Sawao Kato, event planner Kenichi Takamori, and programmer Daisuke Yajima had all worked on earlier Megami Tensei titles; Watanabe and Takamori both worked on Strange Journey. The lead 2D and 3D designers were Tomohiro Okuno and Yasuko Sumiya respectively.

The concept for Radiant Historia was created by Takayashiki, who first pitched his proposal to Atlus in 2007. His initial concept was for a traditional RPG people would enjoy. Atlus was chosen due to Takayashiki's admiration for their past work. While the concept of the 3x3 grid-based battle system was conceived by Takayashiki in the initial proposal, many of the additional elements related to skills were contributed by Atlus staff. According to Hirata, Atlus were intrigued at the collaboration as Radiant Historia was the type of project that would not have appeared within the company. When designing the gameplay, the Atlus staff kept the basic proposal intact while streamlining through refining the mechanics and simplifying sprite animations to quicken the pace of standard battles. The enemy AI was also adjusted to be less punishing while adding field actions to give players an advantage. The time-travel element caused problems for the team as they worked out how to depict the White Chronicle as a game mechanic, while also putting in frequent text updates so players would not forget the story despite the game's place on the portable Nintendo DS meaning interruptions were likely. Atlus later described Radiant Historia as their most challenging development for the DS platform.

Originally hinted at by a trademark in March 2010, Radiant Historia was officially announced in July of that year. As reported by Japanese magazine Famitsu, the game was 80% complete at that point. The game was released in Japan on November 3 of the same year. A North American release was first announced in the same month, localized and published by Atlus' North American branch Atlus USA. Localization efforts for the game began in August 2010, with a large team including four translators for just the game's text. Editing of text was handled by Nich Maragos, Scott Strichart, Mike Meeker and Clayton Chan, while the QA team was led by Richard Rodrigues. During their editing sessions, Maragos and Strichart both alternated between different chapters and kept in constant communication to ensure character dialogue remained consistent. The English script's tone was inspired by Queen & Country, a comic series written by Greg Rucka. Speaking in 2015, Maragos later remembered Radiant Historia as his favorite localization up to that point, citing it as far easier than the majority of other titles he had worked on. The game was released in North America on February 22, 2011. The game became a rarity following its release, with Atlus issueing a reprint in 2012 due to fan demand. Radiant Historia was not released in Europe.

=== Scenario and art design ===
The setting and world were created by Takayashiki, who consulted extensively with Konishi. The main writer was Yoh Haduki, who had previously written the scenarios for Shin Megami Tensei: Devil Survivor and Growlanser Wayfarer of Time. Additional writers were Souzou Tonami and Kazuhito Okayama. Takayashiki's initial idea was for a historical drama featuring alternate timelines, which Konishi said would require an extensive cast. While nothing else had been decided, Takayashiki was already toying with the idea of incorporating time travel. An early idea was to incorporate the theme of immortality, which resulted in the main protagonist being an ageless sword rather than a living being. Following talks with Atlus, Takayashiki was persuaded to make the protagonist a human time traveler. Their consultation also altered Takayashiki's original ending concept of a ruined world.

Takayashiki initially planned for sixteen endings across four different countries, but Atlus convinced him that this was impossible. He managed to preserve the branching narrative by cutting down the number of countries by half, and creating the Alternate timeline. Creating the alternate timeline caused problems during the later writing stages. The narrative retained the air of a historical drama from Takayashiki's original proposal, creating a storyline where no-one was explicitly right or wrong. The game's title was created by Atlus staff: "Radiant" referred to Stocke's mission across time to restore the world's light, while "Historia" came from the word "History". It was one of many suggested titles carrying a similar meaning. When creating the branching timelines, Takayashiki used a Microsoft Excel spreadsheet to map out and keep track of the various timelines. The initial story was written in two months, but due to alterations and necessary adjustments to adjoining timelines, in addition to removing two of the proposed countries, it took six months to complete the final story and dialogue.

Konishi designed all the main characters with a distinctive silhouette for players to identify. Based on input from Atlus staff, Konishi refined his initial draft designs. Both Stocke and Eruca were originally meant to be supporting characters, as at the time the protagonist was still to be a sword. After consulting with Atlus, the characters were made the main protagonists. Stocke was originally a plain-looking assassin dressed completely in black, described by Konishi as an amalgamation of typical "cool" game character traits. When he became the main character, Konishi changed his main color to red, reworked his hair so it did not cover his eyes, and made his uniform more militaristic. While it was considered to allow the player to rename Stocke, the team decided against it after multiple readthroughs of the script.

Eruca was the first character Konishi designed, and proved problematic as he had trouble deciding what type of clothing she would wear. She was intended to have long hair typical of princess characters, but was given short hair based on hardware restrictions and the wish to convey a unique look. A different change was Stocke's initial supporting characters Raynie and Marco. Stocke was originally going to be accompanied by two expendable generic units, but as Hirata saw this would negatively impact the player experience, the new characters were added; they were designed to be contrasting personalities who would liven up the party during the opening segments. The character Rosch went through multiple redesigns during development, while Gafka was intended to leave an impression on players. The Beastkind designs reflected their in-world status as people of the forest. Several early Beastkind concepts were combined into those seen in the final game.

=== Radiant Historia: Perfect Chronology ===
Radiant Historia: Perfect Chronology, (Note: Rajianto Hisutoria: Pāfekuto Kuronorojī (ラジアントヒストリア パーフェクトクロノロジー)) an expanded remake of the original game for Nintendo 3DS, began development in 2016 following the completion of Tokyo Mirage Sessions ♯FE, which Hirata directed. A remake of Radiant Historia was originally in production for a different portable platform, the PlayStation Vita, but Hirata's commitment to Tokyo Mirage Sessions ♯FE caused the project to be put on hold. When development on Tokyo Mirage Sessions ♯FE was completed, development resumed. In the time that had passed, the 3DS's userbase had grown to a far larger size than the Vita, resulting in development being shifted to it instead. Hirata had long wanted to return to the universe of Radiant Historia, and after completing Tokyo Mirage Sessions ♯FE talked with Atlus and learned that Radiant Historia had a strong following both in Japan and overseas, prompting Atlus to agree to a remake.

Hirata returned to the remake as producer. The character art was redrawn by Masaki Hirooka, whose previous work includes Castlevania: Order of Ecclesia. His most notable redesign was Eruca, who was given long hair as originally planned to better fit her character as a princess. The anime opening was created by A-1 Pictures. Hirata's main goals were to update the game so that it would appeal to a modern gaming audience, with these involving increasing gameplay speed and adjusting the user interface. After that he decided to create a new scenario, discussing with staff how to implement it. Haduki, who had worked as the scenario writer on the original release, returned to write the new scenario based on Hirata's original concept. Hirata wanted to restore the original game's two discarded story routes, but instead opted for preserving the established scenario. A new gameplay mechanic was the "Support Skill" system, where characters could perform follow-up attacks, a system inspired by a similar mechanic in Tokyo Mirage Sessions ♯FE.

The remake was released in Japan on June 29, 2017. It was released in February 2018 in North America by Atlus, and in Europe by Deep Silver. Downloadable content, composed of both battle challenges and additional narratives, were released in the months following the game's Japanese and Western releases respectively.

=== Music ===
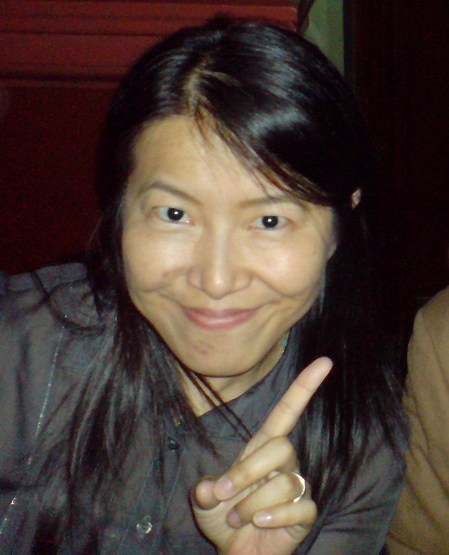
Yoko Shimomura composed the music and theme songs for both versions of the game.

Radiant Historia Original Soundtrack

Soundtrack album by Yoko Shimomura
- Released: December 15, 2010
- Genre: Video game soundtrack
- Length: 1:14:40
- Label: Team Entertainment

The music for Radiant Historia was written by Yoko Shimomura, a composer best known for her work on the Kingdom Hearts series and Legend of Mana. Shimomura acted as sole composer and arranger for the score. She was first contacted about working on the project via email, and while she initially thought it a prank was shocked when she realized the email was real. When creating the score, Shimomura used her usual technique of matching the score to imagery provided by the production team. Due to the game's themes of time travel and its darker side, the score was predominantly sombre in tone. As the game was unconnected to any previous intellectual property, Shimomura found composing the score far easier than most of her other projects.

The first track Shimomura created for the score were the Alistel theme ("Mechanical Kingdom") and the narrative theme ("Where the Wind and Feathers Return"). The battle theme ("Blue Radiance") was a track Shimomura took time over as she did not want it to grow repetitive due to it being the most common battle theme. For the boss theme ("The Edge of Green"), she added a sense of weight using a pipe organ. The use of pipe organ was also included to appeal to fans of her music from earlier projects. Shimomura created twenty-five tracks, mainly using an orchestral style, with some tracks also utilizing pop music instruments or folk elements. The track number was double what she planned, resulting in her tunes going over the console's music file limits. The game used software developed by CRI Middleware for the sound and music environment.

The main theme "Historia" was a vocal theme—an inclusion insisted upon by Shimomura—and was performed by Haruka Shimotsuki. Shimomura's aim was to create an "emotionally heartrending song with a good tempo, but with parts that were both calm and graceful", resulting in her use of acoustic guitar, violin and accordion, alongside incorporating light piano into the entire track. Shimomura brought in Shimotsuki as they had met a few years before over choral work for another project. As the song required six voice tracks to be overlaid, Shimotsuki needed to sing a lot, but needed little to no direction from Shimomura about how to portray the song. The violin was performed by Ayako Ishikawa, while the guitar work was by Hideyuki Yonekawa.

The official soundtrack album, Radiant Historia Original Soundtrack, (Note: Rajianto Hisutoria Orijinaru Saundotorakku (ラジアントヒストリア オリジナルサウンドトラック)) was released through Team Entertainment on December 15, 2010. Critical reception of the album was positive among music critics. Atlus produced a CD containing five piano arrangements of tracks from the game, including a piano rendition of "Historia". Titled Radiant Historia: Piano Selection, (Note: Piano Arenji: Rajianto Hisutoria (ピアノアレンジ：ラジアントヒストリア)) it released alongside the game for the first printing. The piano collection was suggested by Shimomura by Atlus. The core concept was for the tracks to be calm and soothing even if their original forms were more energetic. The tracks were arranged for piano by Sachiko Miyano and performed by Febian Reza Pane. The recording sessions were produced and supervised by Shimomura. Reaction to the piano album was generally negative.

Shimomura returned as composer for Perfect Chronology. In addition to keeping the original score, Shimomura composed a number of new tracks. The soundtrack featured all the old and new music, in addition to arranged versions of multiple tracks including the original theme song "Historia". A notable addition was the new opening theme "Falling Flower, Flowing Water", (Note: Rakka Ryūsui (落花流水)) which featured in the opening anime cutscene. Shimomura wrote both the music and the lyrics, while Shimotsuki returned as the singer. The 2-CD soundtrack album, titled Radiant Historia: Perfect Chronology Original Soundtrack, (Note: Rajianto Hisutoria: Pāfekuto Kuronorojī Orijinaru Saundotorakku (ラジアントヒストリア パーフェクトクロノロジー オリジナルサウンドトラック)) was released on July 26, 2017 through Team Entertainment. A version of the soundtrack also came bundled with the Japanese "Perfect Edition".

== Reception ==
Reception

Aggregate score
Aggregator	Score	
Aggregator	3DS	DS
Metacritic	85/100 (44 reviews)	85/100 (30 reviews)

Review scores
Publication	Score	
Publication	3DS	DS
Destructoid	7.5/10	8.5/10
Eurogamer	N/A	9/10
Famitsu	33/40	9/10, 8/10, 9/10, 8/10
Game Informer	N/A	8.75/10
GameRevolution	4.5/5	N/A
GameSpot	8/10	8/10
GamesTM	N/A	8/10
IGN	N/A	8.5/10
Nintendo World Report	9/10	9/10
Polygon	8/10	N/A

The game released to "generally favorable reviews" according to aggregate site Metacritic, receiving a score of 85 out of 100 based on 30 critic reviews. It was ranked as the third best-reviewed DS title of 2011. Owing to its premise and mechanics, multiple critics compared the game favourably to classic role-playing games from the 16-bit and 32-bit eras, while also noting its bold choices compared to other recent RPGs.

Japanese gaming magazine Famitsu lauded the breadth of choice in the story and the demanding nature of battles. Game Informer's Joe Juba said the narrative and its time travel mechanic "defies the predictability of traditional RPGs" while having a genre-typical structure. Dale North of Destructoid gave general praise to its story and graphics, and enjoyed the battle system aside from some frustrating moments in boss battles. GamesTM was far less positive about its storyline and time travel mechanics, citing the battle system as its redeeming feature. In an import review for Eurogamer, Chris Schilling called it one of the best DS role-playing titles, though he criticised its linear structure.

Shiva Stella of GameSpot felt that Radiant Historia would go on to become a classic of the genre. IGN's Audrey Drake lauded the storyline and battle system, though she disliked the amount of backtracking and redoing events necessary to explore all timeline options. James Jones of Nintendo World Report felt that Radiant Historia "should be on the must-own list of any fans of RPGs" and acted as a fitting end to Atlus's support of the DS platform. Mike Moehnke, writing for RPGamer, felt that the game was an excellent purchase for genre fans despite some annoying elements in its presentation and pacing.

The game's story received a great deal of praise for its handling of the time travel elements and dark tone compared to many other equivalent RPGs despite a few criticisms related to its handling of branching paths and the necessity of jumping between two timelines. The time travel mechanic and its interface met with general praise, though some reviewers were frustrated by its consequent linearity. The battle system was generally cited as both entertaining and demanding due to its positional system and enemy tactics; GamesTM referred to it as "one of the most engaging and rewarding battle systems since Final Fantasy XIII". The graphics were more divisive; many praised them for their 16-bit style, while some saw them as either low-quality or lacking variety. Shimomura's score also met with general praise, though Juba noted the small number of tracks.

Perfect Chronology was given a score of 85 out of 100 by Metacritic based on 44 reviews indicating "generally favorable reviews", being the highest-rated 3DS game of the year. In their review of the game, Famitsu gave praise to the new story content and voice acting. By contrast, C. J. Andriessen of Destructoid found the new content lacking due to its lack of relation to the main narrative; while Nintendo World Report's Neal Ronaghan said that the new content made the story overly complicated. Jeremy Parish, writing for Polygon, felt that the 3DS remake gave the game a chance to find an audience after going mostly unnoticed during its original release. Game Revolution's Cody Perez gave extensive praise to its storyline, combat, graphics, soundtrack and new content. Miguel Conception of GameSpot both enjoyed the game as a whole and praised the remake's new content as a good buy for both newcomers and owners of the original.

=== Sales ===
Upon its release, Radiant Historia debuted in sixth place in game sales charts with over 32,800 units, being the second highest new release following Fallout: New Vegas. It sold through just under 44% of its initial shipment. By the end of the year, the game had sold over 56,500 units. Upon its North American debut, the game reached the top of DS sales charts. The following month, the game had dropped to third place.

Perfect Chronology debuted in Japan at #1, selling 21,429 units and pushing Nintendo Switch exclusive Arms to #2 after two weeks at the top of the charts. According to data from North America's NPD Group, the game was the third best-selling 3DS game in the region during February 2018. In the United Kingdom, Perfect Chronology entered the 3DS gaming charts at eighth place.

=== Accolades ===
In IGN's "Best of 2011" awards, the game was nominated for the "Best 3DS/DS Story" and "Best 3DS/DS Role-Playing Game" awards. Nintendo Life gave it an honourable mention for their Game of the Year award. RPGFan gave it the "Best Traditional RPG" award (tied with The Legend of Heroes: Trails in the Sky), while editor Neal Chandran chose it as his pick for the "Best RPG" award. Game Informer gave it the "Best Old-School Homage" award. Samantha Nelson of The A.V. Club chose it as her staff pick for Game of the Year. RPGamer chose the game as Third Place for the RPG of the Year award.
