= The Alchemist Code =

2016 video game

- Mobile app icon

誰ガ為のアルケミスト (Dare ga Tame no Arukemisuto)
- Video game
- Developer: Jun Imaizumi
- Publisher: Fuji & gumi Games
- Directed by: Shōji Kawamori
- Produced by: Jun Imaizumi
- Music by: Yoko Shimomura; Shinya Tanaka; Shigeki Hayashi
- Genre: tactical role-playing game
- Platform: Android, iOS, browser
- Released: JP: January 18, 2016; WW: November 2017
- Anime

For Whom the Alchemist Exists: The Movie
- Directed by: Shōji Kawamori; Masanori Takahashi
- Studio: Satelight
- Released: June 14, 2019
- icon

The Alchemist Code (Note: Japanese: 誰ガ為のアルケミスト, Hepburn: Dare ga Tame no Arukemisuto), also known as For Whom the Alchemist Exists, was a 2016 Japanese tactical role-playing game published by Fuji & gumi Games. It was discontinued on November 28, 2024.

== Gameplay ==
The Alchemist Code is a tactical role-playing game that follows seven characters and themed around the seven deadly sins. It takes place on the continent of Babel, where the imposing Tower of Babel stands over seven nations.

The game involves turn-based combat on a grid-based battlefield where units take turns based on speed stats. It also has features such as attacks from the side or rear dealing increased damage, terrain height impacts attack power, defense, and critical hit chances, and friendly fire is also possible. The game can be played in a singleplayer or multiplayer including a player vs player (PVP) system.

== Plot ==
Long ago, the discovery of alchemy led to devastating warfare, nearly driving humanity to extinction. In response, the seven nations forged a fragile peace, banning alchemy for centuries. However, in the Continental Year 911, the nation of Lustrice defied this pact, amassing an alchemy-powered army in a bid for dominance. In retaliation, the other six nations, led by Envylia, united to crush Lustrice and banish alchemy once more. Yet, two decades later, alchemy stirs once again, threatening to plunge the land into turmoil.

== Development and release ==
It was published by Fuji & gumi games. The game was planned, developed, and produced by Jun Imaizumi, the company's vice president. In an interview with Famitsu, that he wanted the game to be a "casual" game. He said after creating the seven characters that he wanted to make the conflict about "alchemy". He also created grids so that the characters can be moved by tapping. The animation was directed by Shōji Kawamori. The game was released in Japan on January 28, 2016, for iOS and Android devices under the title For Whom the Alchemist Exists.

It released its browser version in September 2017. The game was released worldwide in November 2017 under the title The Alchemist Code.

== Discontinuation ==
The international version was discontinued on March 31, 2023. Fuji & gumi Games's website announced on September 26, 2024, that the game will completely end services on November 28, 2024.

Fuji & gumi released a web fan club on January 28, 2025, in commemoration of the ninth anniversary of the game's release where players of the game can communicate with each other.

== Music ==
The music was provided by Yoko Shimomura. the song in the opening scene is by Yoko Hikasa entitled "Ta ga Tame ni", who played Agatsa.

== Reception ==
By April 2019, the game was downloaded 8 million times globally.

Micheal Logarta praised the game for its "engaging gameplay" but commented that the story is a "so-so". It concluded that The Alchemist Code is a "brilliant mobile game". Kurotani Yamaari praised the game for its "solid structure" and "rich story".

== Anime film adaptation ==
An anime adaptation was announced in February 2018. The film was directed by Shōji Kawamori and Masanori Takahashi and animated by Satelight. The film was released on June 14, 2019, under the title For Whom the Alchemist Exists: The Movie.

== Collaborations ==
The game made several collaborations. In 2018, it collaborated with Fate/stay night, a visual novel game, where users can use characters from the game., In 2020, it collaborated with The Rising of the Shield Hero where users could summon characters from the anime. In May 2021, it collaborated with the game Crystal of Re:Union where users could get luxurious items from the game by signing in. In July, it collaborated with the anime That Time I Got Reincarnated as a Slime where users could play as Rimuru Tempest, a character from the series. In November, it collaborated with the manga The Seven Deadly Sins where users could play characters from the series.
