= Game Music Festival =

Music festival

- Genre: Video game music
- Locations: Narodowe Forum Muzyki in Wrocław, Royal Festival Hall in London, Fairfield Halls in London
- Years active: Since 2018
- Next event: February 15, 2026, The Symphony of the Sword
- Organiser: Game Music Foundation
- Website: https://gmfest.com/

Game Music Festival is an international music festival dedicated to the popularization of video game soundtracks and promoting them as a form of art. The event was held at the National Forum of Music in Wrocław, Poland, from 2018. In 2022 and 2024, the fourth and fifth edition of the Festival took place in London's Royal Festival Hall.

Third edition of Game Music Festival was streamed on Twitch platform.

The sixth edition is planned for February and June 2026, featuring The Symphony of the Sword concert on February 15th in Wrocław, Poland, followed by five other concerts throughout June in London.

== Format of the Festival ==
Each iteration of the Game Music Festival is focused on a series of live concerts based on newly created arrangements of the soundtracks from a particular game franchise. These concerts are often monographic in character, aiming to present the music attributed to a selected game or composer in a coherent manner. The performance itself can assume various musical forms, such as a symphonic suite, a concerto grosso, or a jazz big-band piece.

Concerts of each Game Music Festival are not accompanied by any visualizations. Sound is not amplified electronically unless this is required by a particular instrument. Game Music Festival also includes multiple auxiliary events such as masterclass workshops, panel discussions, case studies, meet-and-greet sessions. For each edition, organizers are inviting composers and special guests connected to presented games and soundtracks, who then join aforementioned panels and workshops.

Concerts of Game Music Festival
Year	Concert title	Soundtracks	Performers
2018	The Symphony of Heroes	Heroes of Might and Magic series (including parts II III, IV)	NFM Wrocław Philharmonic
2018	The Jazz of Grim Fandango	Grim Fandango	Bartosz Pernal Orchestra
2018	The Symphony of the Forest	Ori and the Blind Forest	Sound Factory Orchestra
2018	The Symphony of the Storm	Diablo, Diablo 2, World of Warcraft, StarCraft, StarCraft II	NFM Wrocław Philharmonic, NFM Choir
2019	The Symphony of the Desert	Journey, Abzû, The Banner Saga	Sound Factory Orchestra
2019	The Symphony of the Colossus	ICO, Shadow of the Colossus, The Last Guardian	Sound Factory Orchestra
2019	The Symphony of the Shadows	Assassin's Creed II, Hitman series (including Codename 47, Silent Assassin, Contracts, Blood Money)	NFM Wrocław Philharmonic, NFM Choir
2020	The Symphony of Four Worlds	Bastion, Transistor, Pyre, Hades	Sound Factory Orchestra
2020	The Symphony of Sin	Divinity: Original Sin II, Baldur's Gate III	Opole Philharmonic Orchestra, Medici Cantantes Choir
2022	The Jazz of Cuphead	Cuphead	Bartosz Pernal Orchestra
2022	The Symphony of the Spirits	Ori and the Blind Forest	Philharmonia Orchestra, Hertfordshire Chorus
2024	The Symphony of the Realms	Baldur's Gate 3	Philharmonia Orchestra, Hertfordshire Chorus
2024	The Sounds of the Fireflies	The Last of Us, The Last of Us Part II	Philharmonia Orchestra, Gustavo Santaolalla
2024	The Sounds of the Fireflies - Wrocław	The Last of Us, The Last of Us Part II	NFM Wrocław Philharmonic, Gustavo Santaolalla
2026	The Symphony of the Sword	Kingdom Come: Deliverance, Kingdom Come: Deliverance II	NFM Wrocław Philharmonic, Medici Cantantes Choir, Veratus, Jan Valta
2026	The Infernal Symphony	Diablo franchise (including Lord of Hatred)	London Mozart Players, Hertfordshire Chorus
2026	The Colors of Harmony: Hitoshi Sakimoto 40th Anniversary Celebration	13 Sentinels: Aegis Rim, Odin Sphere Leifthrasir, Final Fantasy Tactics, Final Fantasy XII	London Mozart Players, Hitoshi Sakimoto
2026	The Art of Game Music with Troy Baker and Austin Wintory	Journey, Assassin’s Creed: Syndicate, ABZÛ, The Pathless, Sword of the Sea	London Mozart Players, Troy Baker, Austin Wintory
2026	Ballads of the Underworld	Hades, Hades II	London Mozart Players, Darren Korb, Ashley Barret, Austin Wintory
2026	Persona Grooves	Persona 3, Persona 4, Persona 5	Bartosz Pernal Orchestra, London Mozart Players, Shoji Meguro
