= Tomomi Nishimoto =

Japanese conductor

Tomomi Nishimoto (西本智実) is a Japanese conductor.

== Biography ==
Tomomi Nishimoto was born in Osaka, Japan on 22 April 1970. Her experience learning to play the piano from her mother (Note: Her mother majored in voice in college and gave piano lessons at her home.) at the age of three as well as her mother's musical influence are what fuelled her interest to become a conductor in the future. After receiving her Bachelor of Music in Composition from Osaka College of Music in 1994, she was admitted to the Saint Petersburg State Conservatory.

Although she had the experience of conducting opera during her years in Osaka College of Music as a vice conductor, her formal conducting career started in 1998 with the Kyoto Symphony Orchestra. Since then she has conducted many orchestras in Japan and abroad.

Her professional career in Russia started in 1999, when she conducted the Saint Petersburg Philharmonic. In 2002, she was appointed as the chief conductor of the Bolshoi Symphony Orchestra "Millennium". In addition, she has served as the principal guest conductor of the St. Petersburg Mussorgsky State Academic Opera and Ballet Theatre (2004–2006) and was also appointed as the Chief Conductor and Artistic Director for Russian Symphony Orchestra of the Tchaikovsky Foundation (2004–2007). In 2005, she conducted the first public performance of a completion of Tchaikovsky’s unfinished Symphony "Life" that the Tchaikovsky Fund had commissioned.

== Recent activities ==
Through her work in 2007, conducting the Bruckner Orchestra Linz at Brucknerhaus in Austria, Nishimoto has also become active in Europe. Subsequently, she has conducted many European orchestras such as Monte Carlo Philharmonic Orchestra, Royal Philharmonic Orchestra, Budapest Philharmonic Orchestra, Romanian State Philharmonic Orchestra (George Enescu), Lithuanian Chamber Orchestra and Latvian National Symphony Orchestra. In addition to her activities with the orchestras, Nishimoto has also collaborated with Prague National Opera and the Hungarian State Opera as an opera conductor.

Nishimoto was the Principal Guest Conductor of the State Symphony Orchestra of Russia from 2010 to 2011.

== Current Positions ==
- Artistic Director and Conductor of IlluminArt (Orchestra, Opera, Ballet, Chorus) (2012)
- Honorary Ambassador for the city of Hirado (2013)
- Visiting Professor (Conducting), Osaka College of Music (2014)
- Honorary Artistic Advisor, Guangzhou Opera House (2018)
- Named Conductor, the European Foundation for Support of Culture (2019)
- Specially Appointed Senior Academic Researcher, Center for Mind and Kansei Sciences Research, Hiroshima University (2021)

== Awards received ==
- Idemitsu Award (1999)
- St. Stanislav Medal (1999)
- Sakuya Konohana Award (2000)
- Fondazione Pro Musica e Arte Sacra Award (2014)

== Other remarks ==
- Selected as one of the 100 most respected Japanese in Newsweek Japan
- Elected as Young Global Leader 2007 of the World Economic Forum
- Awarded 2009 Best Dresser Awards
