= Osaka Junior College of Music =

Japanese music school

- 大阪音楽大学短期大学部
- Type: Private junior college
- Established: 1951
- Location: Toyonaka, Osaka, Japan
- Website: http://www.daion.ac.jp/course/

Osaka Junior College of Music (大阪音楽大学短期大学部, Ōsaka Ongaku Daigaku Tanki Daigakubu) is a private junior college in Toyonaka, Osaka, Japan.

== History ==
The junior college opened in April 1951, but the predecessor of the school was founded in 1915 in Osaka city. It moved to Toyonaka in 1954.

== Courses ==
- Music

== See also ==
- Osaka College of Music
