= Adventures in the Magic Kingdom =

1990 video game

- US box art
- Developer: Capcom
- Publisher: Capcom
- Producers: Tokuro Fujiwara; Darlene Waddington
- Designer: Yoshinori Takenaka
- Composer: Yoko Shimomura
- Platform: NES
- Release: NA: June 1990; PAL: December 10, 1992
- Genre: Action
- Mode: Single-player

Adventures in the Magic Kingdom is an action video game released in 1990 by Capcom for the Nintendo Entertainment System. Its soundtrack was composed by Yoko Shimomura. The game was released in five different regions (British Isles, North America, France, Scandinavia, and Australasia), using three different retail covers. The game places the player as a nameless main character, for whom the player can enter a name at the start of the game, into a hub-and-spoke Disney park heavily based on the company's Disneyland, Magic Kingdom, and Tokyo Disneyland parks. Goofy left the golden key for the castle gate inside, and Mickey Mouse asks for the player's help to find six silver keys needed to open the Cinderella Castle gate and allow the Disney parade to begin. After completing this task, Mickey congratulates the player and the parade begins.

== Gameplay ==
Playing the Haunted Mansion level

The player must complete five different stages, modeled after rides in Disney theme parks, as well as a trivia quest in order to retrieve the set of keys. The player chooses which stage to play by walking around the park in the game's overworld map.

The game features two vehicle stages with a top-down perspective. One of these stages is based on the Autopia ride and is a driving game in which the player must avoid various obstacles in a race against the villainous Panhandle Pete. The second, based on Big Thunder Mountain Railroad, has the player controlling a train on a track and having to choose the right path to take while avoiding obstacles.

There are also two side-scrolling stages. In the Haunted Mansion stage, the player must defeat ghosts by throwing candles at them to retrieve one of the keys. The other side-scrolling stage is based on Pirates of the Caribbean and the player must rescue six villagers from pirates who have raided an island.

The Space Mountain stage is a first-person stage in which the player boards a spaceship with the mission to reach a certain star, maneuvering through asteroids while shooting enemy ships with a phaser. The trivia game is available to play at any time. Several children around the park ask the player questions about Disney films and characters; if these are answered correctly, the children will reveal the location of the final silver key.

== Reception ==
Total! magazine gave the game an overall score of 44 out of 100 criticizing the game being unoriginal, having many glitches, easy gameplay that is boring with terrible collision detection concluding "Mickey's no Mario in this collection of sub-standard sub-games with a flimsy Disney connection".

== See also ==
- Kinect: Disneyland Adventures
- List of Disney video games
