= Code Name: Viper =

1990 video game

Ningen Heiki Dead Fox Code Name: Viper
- North American box art
- Developers: Arc System Works (Note: Assistance on graphics and sound by Capcom.)
- Publisher: Capcom
- Composers: Junko Tamiya; Yoko Shimomura
- Platform: Nintendo Entertainment System
- Release: JP: February 23, 1990; NA: March 1990
- Genres: Action, platform
- Mode: Single-player

Code Name: Viper, known in Japan as Ningen Heiki Dead Fox (Note: Japanese: 人間兵器デッドフォックス, Hepburn: Ningen Heiki Deddo Fokkusu), is an action-platform video game developed by Arc System Works and published by Capcom in 1990 for the Nintendo Entertainment System. The player takes control of a special forces operative who must combat a drug syndicate in South America.

== Plot ==
The player takes the role of Kenny Smith, code name "Viper", an agent of the 98th Special Forces. He is assigned by his superior, Commander Jones, to investigate a large drug syndicate that covers most of South America (Venezuela, Brazil, Chile, Peru, Paraguay, Argentina, Bolivia). Smith's objective is to rescue a missing agent in each of the syndicate's seven hideouts and uncover clues of the Syndicate's true mastermind.

== Gameplay ==
The first stage of Code Name: Viper is set in the middle of the jungle.

The gameplay system is similar to Namco's 1986 arcade game Rolling Thunder, specifically its own NES version. Like in Rolling Thunder, the player can jump or drop down between floors by holding the directional pad up or down and pressing the jump button, as well as enter doors to obtain power-ups or avoid enemies. The player can be armed with one of two weapons (a standard issue pistol or a fully automatic machine gun for continuous firepower). Items includes additional ammunition for either weapon, extra health, a time extension, and extra lives. Unlike Rolling Thunder, the player can shoot while jumping and can also change directions during midair.

Another difference between Rolling Thunder and Code Name: Viper is the added emphasis on rescuing hostages, like the also-similar Shinobi. Throughout the first seven stages, the player can find captured civilians, who will offer the player their gratitude, behind certain doors. To complete each of the first seven stages, the player must rescue a captured commando who will provide the grenades necessary to blow up the obstruction blocking the exit at the end of each stage and advance the plot. At the end of each stage, Kenny will be seen at a campfire with the rescued commando, who will provide clues which is then shown in a blank letter that slowly starts to gain words and outline.

Per Rolling Thunder, the strength and attack patterns of the standard enemy soldiers that the player will face is determined by the colors of their outfit, and "strange" enemies, such as Snipers, Frogmen, and Maniacs, appear later on. There are a total of eight stages, with three difficulty settings.

== Reception ==
Reception

Review score
Publication	Score
Electronic Gaming Monthly	8/10, 5/10, 6/10, 7/10

The game received a score of 60 in Famitsu.
