= Hertfordshire Chorus =

Hertfordshire Chorus, formed in 1970, is one of the leading large choirs in England with over 130 members from across the county of Hertfordshire, London and the surrounding areas, performing across the country and regularly touring.

Initially, Hertfordshire Chorus was known as the Hatfield Philharmonic Chorus which, with the Hatfield Philharmonic Orchestra, was conducted by Frank Shipway who was instrumental in founding the Hatfield Philharmonic Society, of which it was a part.

Michael Kibblewhite was appointed chorus master in 1973 and, in 1977, Shipway, musical director of the orchestra, moved on. The society appointed Howard Burrell to conduct the orchestra alongside Kibblewhite's choir. The two groups later split, with the orchestra remaining as the Hatfield Philharmonic Society and the chorus becoming independent.

Michael Kibblewhite became the musical director and conductor of the new chorus, bringing in professional orchestras for concerts, a trend continued today. David Temple replaced Michael Kibblewhite as musical director in September 2000 and Rufus Frowde is their accompanist.

The choir has performed in venues across the United Kingdom and Europe, including the Royal Albert Hall, the Royal Festival Hall and The Sage Gateshead. Hertfordshire Chorus is renowned for its innovative programming, frequently involving commissions such as "Mass in Blue" and "Ode to a Nightingale" by Will Todd, "Ice" by Orlando Gough, "Solaris" by Steve Block and "Codebreaker" by James McCarthy. The choir recorded "Ode to a Nightingale" and Codebreaker", with the BBC Concert Orchestra in 2017, released on Signum Records in October 2017.

Hertfordshire Chorus regularly supply choirs to sing at weddings and funerals in the Hertfordshire area.

Recently, with an influx of new, younger members, the choir has branched out, with singers providing vocal support for Ray Davies in live gigs and his The Kinks Choral Collection album, Andrea Bocelli, Goldfrapp, Bombay Bicycle Club, Noel Gallagher, Faryl Smith and singing the lead track "Zadok the Priest" on the album Pride of the Nation by the Band of the Coldstream Guards. Hertfordshire Chorus have also provided singers for TV shows including BBC's The Choir and The One Show. It performed Fauré's Requiem mass and several other pieces on BBC Radio 2's Good Friday show: "At the foot of the cross", recorded live in St Albans Cathedral, and has been broadcast many times on BBC Radio and Classic FM.
