= Alph Lyla =

In-house band of video game developer Capcom

Alph Lyla (アルフ・ライラ), also known as Alfh Lyra wa Lyra or Alpha Lyla, was Capcom's "house band", composed of several Capcom musicians and sound designers. They disbanded in the late 1990s. The name derives from the katakana spelling of One Thousand and One Nights in Arabic.

Members of the band included pianist Pii♪ (a.k.a. Yoko Shimomura), keyboardists Bunbun (a.k.a. Yasuaki Fujita) and Pakkun, guitarist Uppi (a.k.a. Kazushi Ueda), bassist WOODY, and drummer Tatsui, amongst others.

Some of their works appear on the following albums:

- Daimakaimura ~ G.S.M. Capcom 1 (D28B-0011)
- Strider ~ G.S.M. Capcom 2 (D25B-1001)
- Final Fight ~ G.S.M. Capcom 3 (PCCB-00030)
- Street Fighter II ~ G.S.M. Capcom 4 (PCCB-00056)
- Captain Commando ~ G.S.M. Capcom 5 (PCCB-00083)
- Varth: Operation Thunderstorm ~ G.S.M. Capcom 6 (PCCB-00110)
- Tenchi wo Kurau II: The Battle of Chi Bi ~ G.S.M. Capcom 7 (PCCB-00133)
- Rockman X with Toshiaki Ohtsubo (SRCL-2828)
- Street Fighter II Alph-Lyla with Yuji Toriyama (SRCL-2857)
